= On-ride camera =

Roller coaster element

An on-ride camera is a camera mounted next to or above the track of a roller coaster, log flume, or other amusement ride that photographs all of the riders on each passing vehicle. They are often mounted at the most intense or fastest part of the ride, resulting in distorted expressions due to fear or wind resistance.

Upon exiting the ride, park guests pass a booth or shop where their vehicle's pictures are on display screens. Depending on the size of the vehicle used by the attraction, the entire car or groups of one, two, or four may comprise one photograph. The display images are numbered, and customers wishing to purchase a photo as a souvenir take the appropriate number to a cashier. This photo shop may be located in the same building as the displays or in a separate shop nearby. Many parks offer minimal editing tools (such as red-eye effect removal) before purchase. The photo is usually ready within minutes of being taken for purchase. The photos may be sold as physical prints, digital files, or put onto merchandise items like keychains.

An unusual camera configuration could be found on the former hydraulically launched roller coasters Top Thrill Dragster at Cedar Point and Kingda Ka at Six Flags Great Adventure. Both had two cameras, one during the high-speed launch segment and another in the final brake run, providing riders with a before and after picture of themselves. Another unusual configuration can be found on Hydra the Revenge at Dorney Park & Wildwater Kingdom. The ride features two cameras: one takes a rider's picture before an inversion and the other takes a picture while the rider is in the inversion. Another example of a multi-camera ride is TRON Lightcycle / Run at Magic Kingdom, which takes photos of both sides of the ride vehicle.

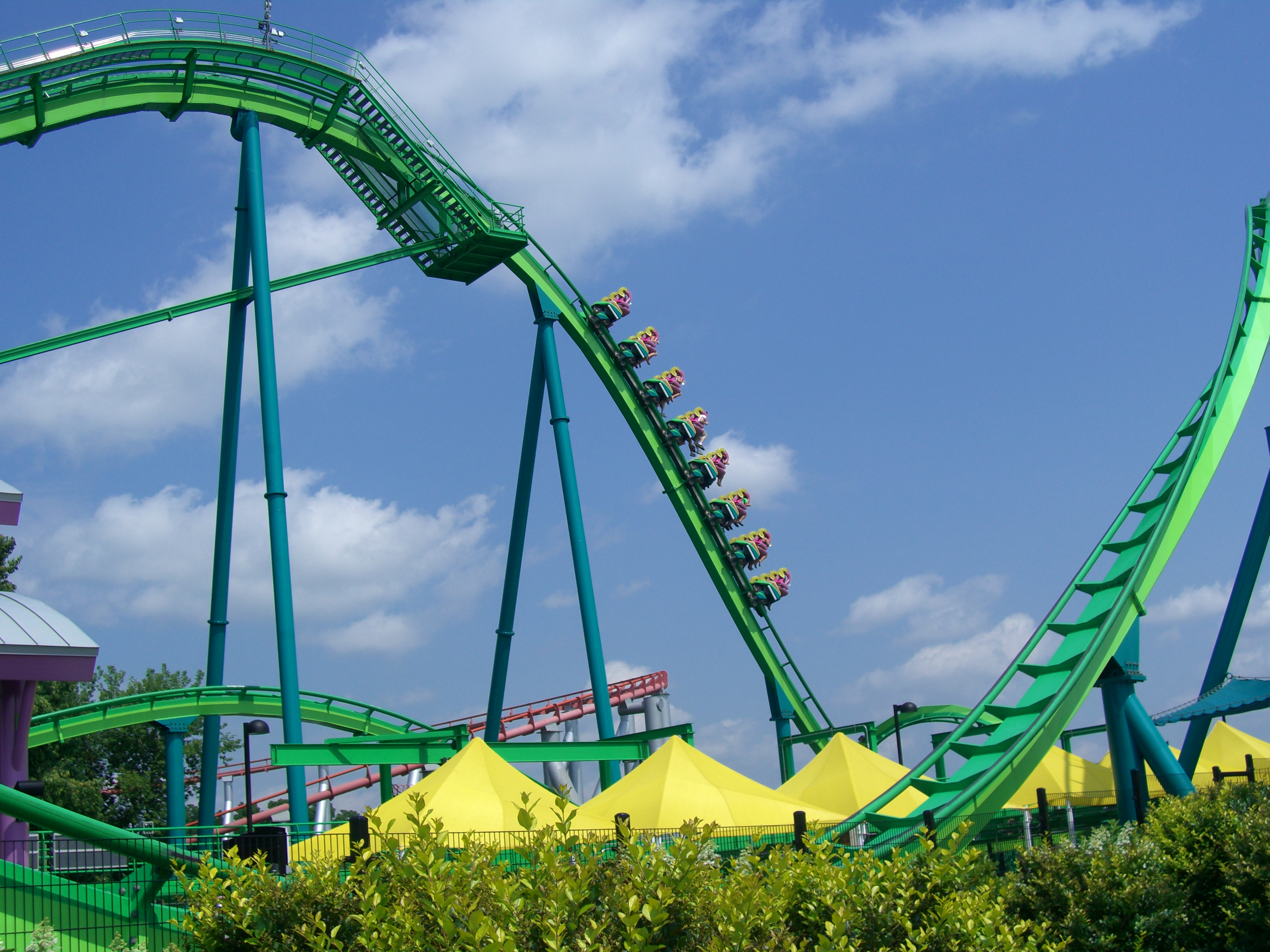
Hydra the Revenge at Dorney Park & Wildwater Kingdom

== Video ==
On some rides, on-ride videos are recorded by cameras mounted alongside the track, similar to on-ride photo cameras. This provides a third person montage-style of cuts which show the train entering, passing through and leaving the frame. Rides that use this system include SheiKra at Busch Gardens Tampa Bay and Mystic Timbers at Kings Island.

Using the alternate system, videos are recorded by cameras mounted inside the ride vehicles, usually on the back of the seat in front of the subject. This provides a first-person stream of consciousness-style video, showing the riders' emotions close-up from start to finish. Some coasters that use this system are Thunderhawk at Michigan's Adventure, Blue Fire at Europa-Park, and Verbolten at Busch Gardens Williamsburg.
