= Launch track =

Roller coaster element

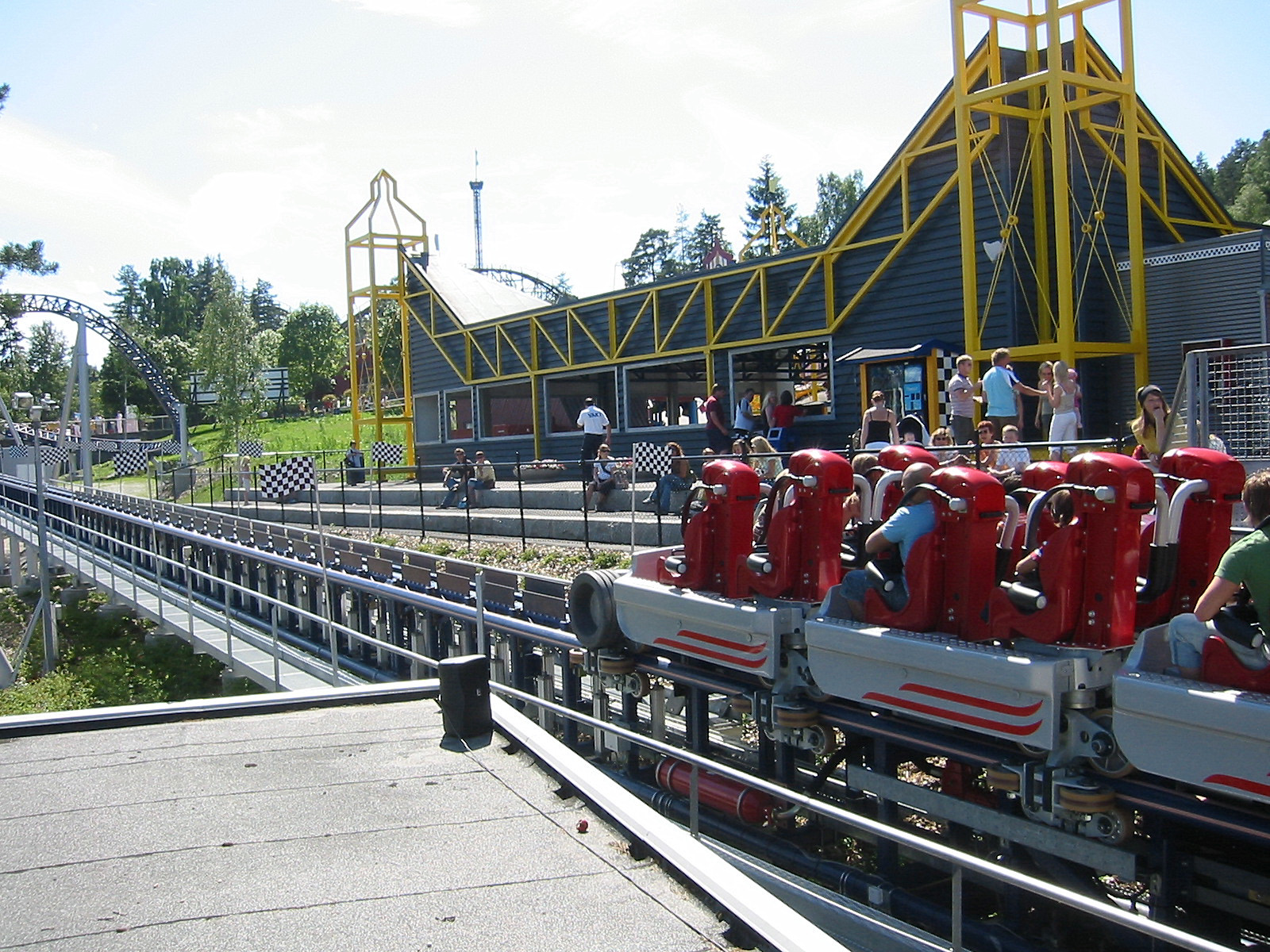
Speed Monster (2006), at Tusenfryd of Norway, prominently features a launch track.

The launch track is the section of a launched roller coaster in which the train is accelerated to its full speed in a matter of seconds. A launch track is always straight and is usually banked upwards slightly, so that a train would roll backwards to the station in the event of a loss of power.

A launch track serves the same basic purpose as a lift hill - providing power to the train - but accomplishes it in an entirely different manner. A lift hill gives the train potential energy by raising it to the highest point in the track (and not significantly accelerating it). A launch track gives the train kinetic energy by accelerating it to the maximum designed speed (while not significantly raising it).

A launch track normally includes some form of brakes. Depending on the type of coaster, these brakes may be used in every run of the coaster (this is normally found on a Shuttle roller coaster where the launch track also serves as the main brake run) or they may only come into play when a rollback occurs, normally on a complete-circuit coaster such as Red Force, Top Thrill Dragster and Kingda Ka. In either case, the brakes are retracted to allow trains to launch, and are engaged at all other times.

== Types of launch tracks ==
=== LIM/LSM ===
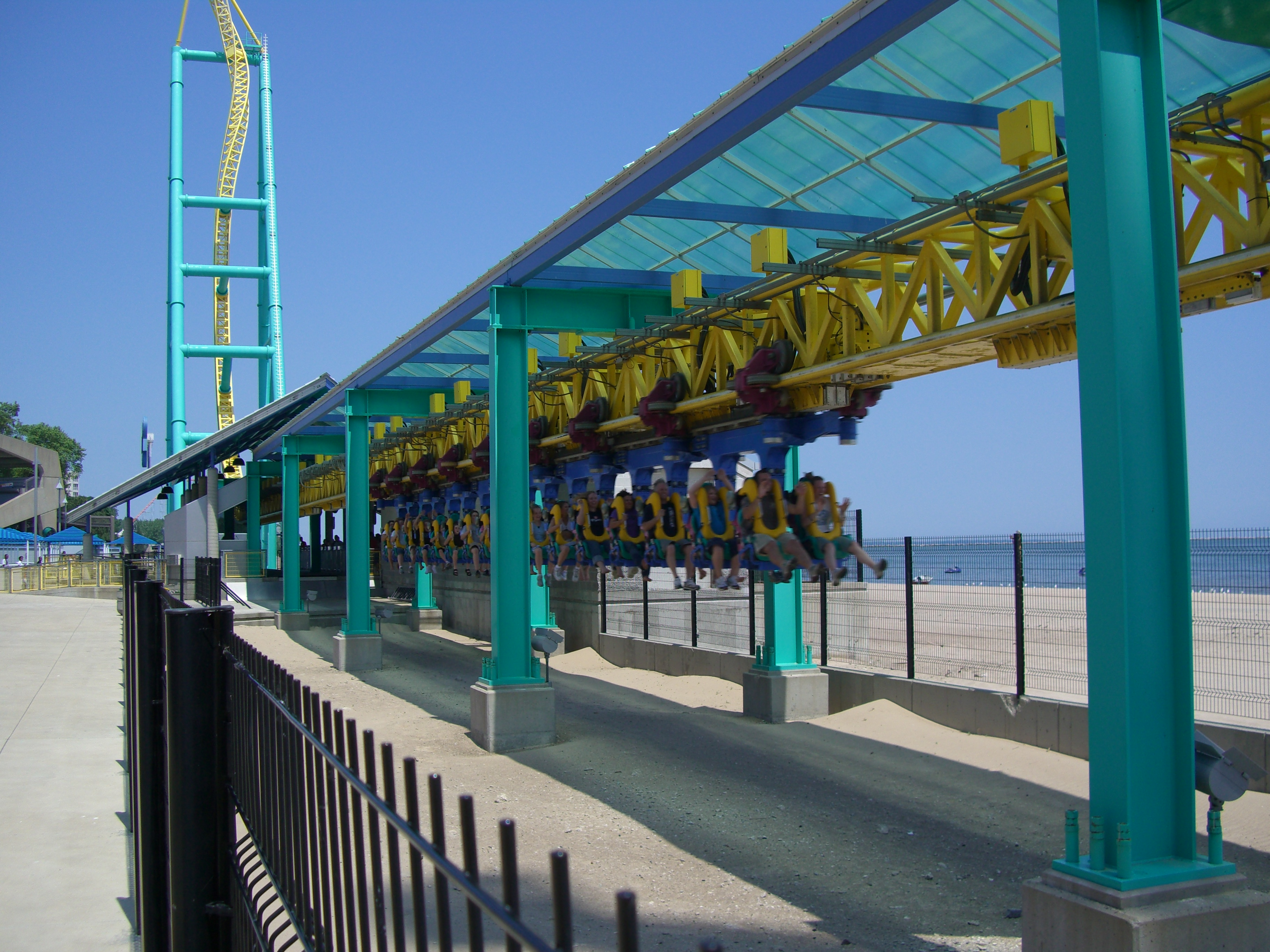
Wicked Twister (LIM) launching

LIM/LSM (Linear induction motor/Linear synchronous motor) launch tracks have many (often more than 200) linear motors on both sides of the launch track. The train on this type of coaster has metal fins mounted to its sides to facilitate launching. A magnetic field is created by the LIMs on the track, which attract the car and send it forward. The next LIM on the track is magnetized, and the previous one loses its field. This continually attracts the car forward until it reaches the end of the launch track at full speed.

=== Hydraulic ===
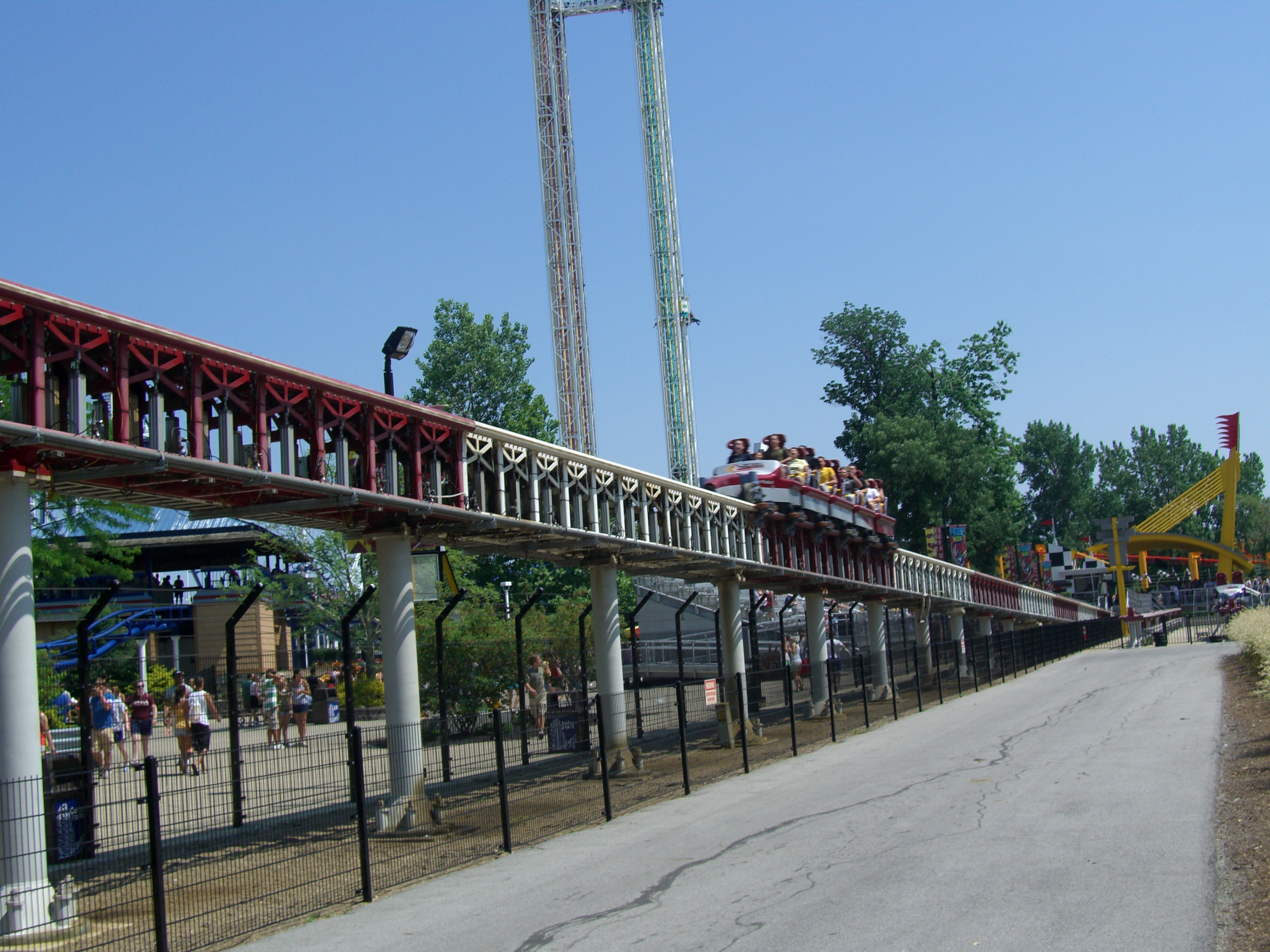
Top Thrill Dragster (hydraulic) launching; note elevation change

A hydraulic launch track has a trough running along its center, a "catch car" that connects to the train for launching travels through this trough. The catch car is connected to a cable loop that runs along the entire length of the launch track, anchored by a pulley wheel at the near end of the track and by the launch motor itself at the far end. The launch motor is located in a small building under the end of the launch track. Only about 2/3 of the length of this type of launch track can be used for launching the train, as the catch car must be stopped after it disengages from the train. This type of propulsion is capable of catapulting a train to very high speeds, yet is only used mostly by Intamin, S&S Sansei, and less abundantly used by Vekoma, in their Accelerator coasters, Air Launched coasters, and Motorbike coasters, respectively. An example of an Intamin manufactured launch system is the Formula Rossa in Abu Dhabi, which accelerates the coaster train to its top speed of 240 km/h (150 mph) in approximately 5 seconds.

=== Friction wheel ===
A friction wheel launch consists of a series of high speed drive tires used in succession to propel the train forward. An example of a friction wheel launch is the Incredible Hulk Coaster at Universal's Islands of Adventure.

=== Flywheel ===
Many shuttle loop roller coasters have a flywheel launch mechanism. The flywheel launch uses a large amount of built-up rotational energy to propel the train forward. A flywheel allows for consistent energy buildup, usually from an electric motor, and prevents usage of large amounts of energy from power grids which may impact the surrounding area.

Anton Schwarzkopf began using the flywheel launch mechanism on his second generation of shuttle loop roller coasters. His first generation used a weight-drop launching system that was later developed into a flywheel launch. Schwarzkopf's first shuttle loop coaster using the flywheel launch mechanism was Montezooma's Revenge at Knott's Berry Farm.

=== Counterweight ===
Counterweight launch mechanisms are used on some shuttle loops. The trains are launched by dropping a large counterweight attached to a cable. The cable then drives the train forward.

=== Cable ===
Disneyland Paris' Space Mountain uses this system. The train arrives at an incline and stops and hooks on to the pulley/catapult. The train is then launched up the hill and the cable falls back to the bottom.
