= The Caution Zone =

Roller coaster in California

The Caution Zone was a backyard roller coaster built by Will Pemble in Orinda, California. Pemble was inspired to build the roller coaster along with his family members after riding Kingda Ka at Six Flags Great Adventure.

The coaster was 180 feet (55 m) long, 15 feet (4.6 m) tall, and cost US$3,500 to construct. It ran until 2015.
