= Red Force (roller coaster) =

2017 steel roller coaster in Spain

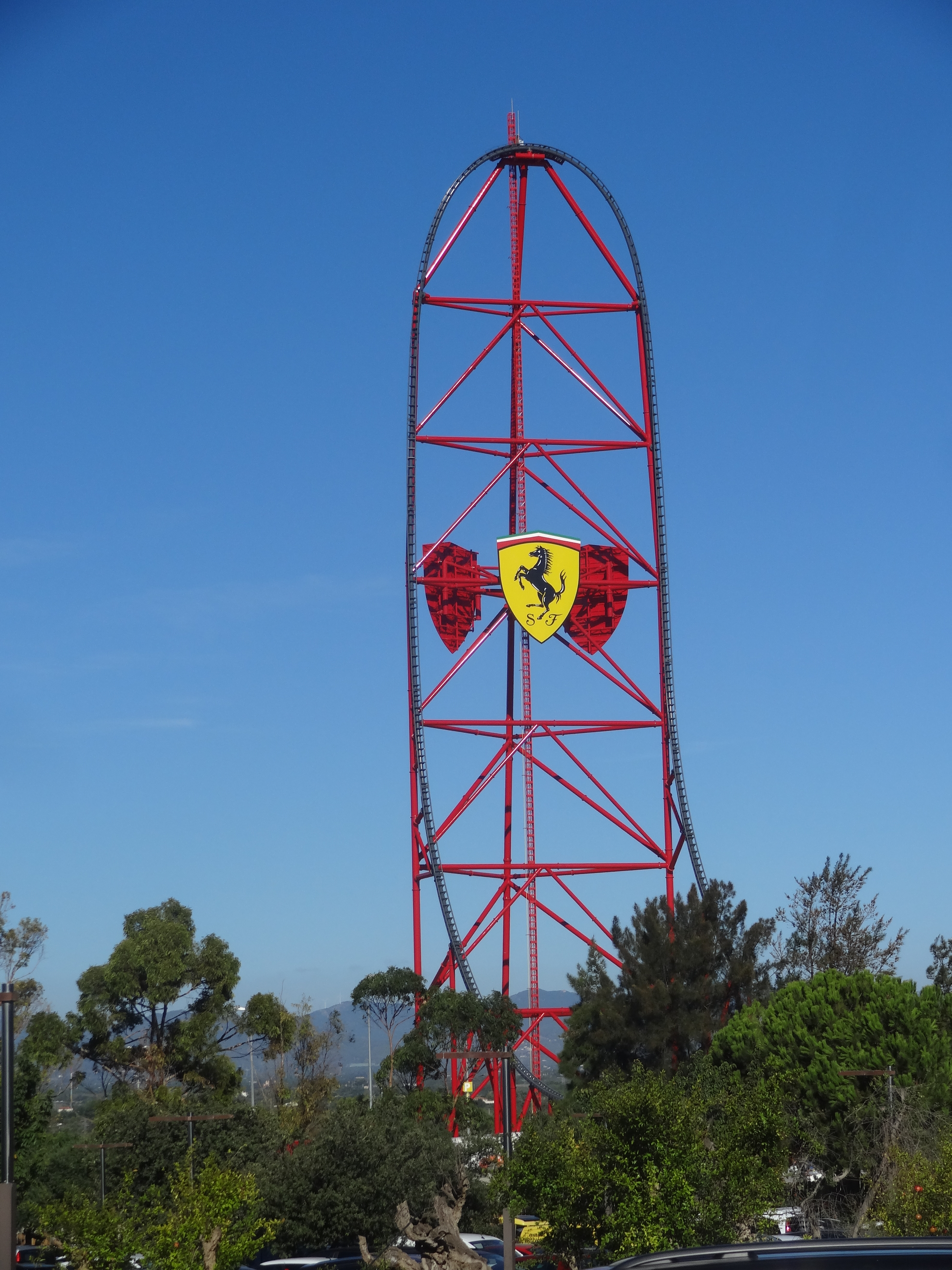
- Red Force's signature top hat feature

Ferrari Land
- Location: Ferrari Land
- Coordinates: 41.0842°N 1.1513°E
- Status: Operating
- Opening date: 7 April 2017

General statistics
- Type: Steel – Launched
- Manufacturer: Intamin
- Model: LSM Launch Coaster
- Lift/launch system: LSM
- Height: 112 m (367 ft)
- Length: 880 m (2,890 ft)
- Speed: 180 km/h (112 mph)
- Inversions: 0
- Duration: 0:39
- Max vertical angle: 90°
- Capacity: 1200 riders per hour
- Acceleration: 0 to 180 km/h (0 to 112 mph) in 5 seconds
- Height restriction: 140–195 cm (4 ft 7 in – 6 ft 5 in)
- Trains: 3 trains with 3 cars; riders arranged 2 across in 2 rows for a total of 12 riders per train
- Red Force at RCDB

Video
- Red Force point-of-view

Red Force is a steel launched giga roller coaster located at Ferrari Land within PortAventura World in Salou, Catalonia, Spain. The ride was manufactured by Liechtenstein-based manufacturer Intamin and opened on 7 April 2017. With a height of 112 metres (367 ft) and a maximum speed of 180 kilometres per hour (112 mph), it is Europe's only Giga coaster. From November 2024 to May 2025, Red Force was the tallest roller coaster in the world, following the closure of Kingda Ka and prior to the reopening of Top Thrill 2.

== Characteristics ==
=== Ride experience ===
Once the train leaves the station, it is accelerated by linear synchronous motors from 0 to 180 kilometres per hour (112 mph) in 5 seconds. The train then ascends a 112-metre (367 ft) tall top hat, twisting 90 degrees to the left. Once the train goes over the top hat, it descends back down, again twisting 90 degrees to the left. This sends the train travelling parallel to the launch track but in the opposite direction. The train then enters a flat brake run and then ascends a small airtime hill before entering the final set of brakes.

=== Trains ===
Red Force has trains with three cars. Each car seats four riders, allowing a total of twelve riders per train. The ride can accommodate approximately 1,200 riders per hour.

=== Track ===
The steel track of Red Force is approximately 880 metres (2,890 ft) long and 112 metres (367 ft) tall. The track is dark grey and the supports are red.

=== Launch ===
Red Force uses linear synchronous motors to accelerate the train from 0 to 180 kilometres per hour (112 mph) in 5 seconds. The ride uses supercapacitors to store and dissipate the energy needed to launch the train, reducing the peak load from the power grid necessary to launch the coaster.

== Records ==
| Preceded by Kingda Ka | World's Tallest Full-Circuit Roller Coaster; November 11, 2024 - May 3, 2025 | Succeeded by Top Thrill 2 |
| Preceded by Kingda Ka | World's Tallest Roller Coaster; November 11, 2024 - May 3, 2025 | Succeeded by Top Thrill 2 |
| Preceded by Kingda Ka | World's Tallest Roller Coaster Drop; November 11, 2024 – May 3, 2025 | Succeeded by Top Thrill 2 |

== See also ==
- Top Thrill Dragster
- Kingda Ka
- Formula Rossa
- 2017 in amusement parks
