= Stealth (roller coaster) =

Steel launched roller coaster

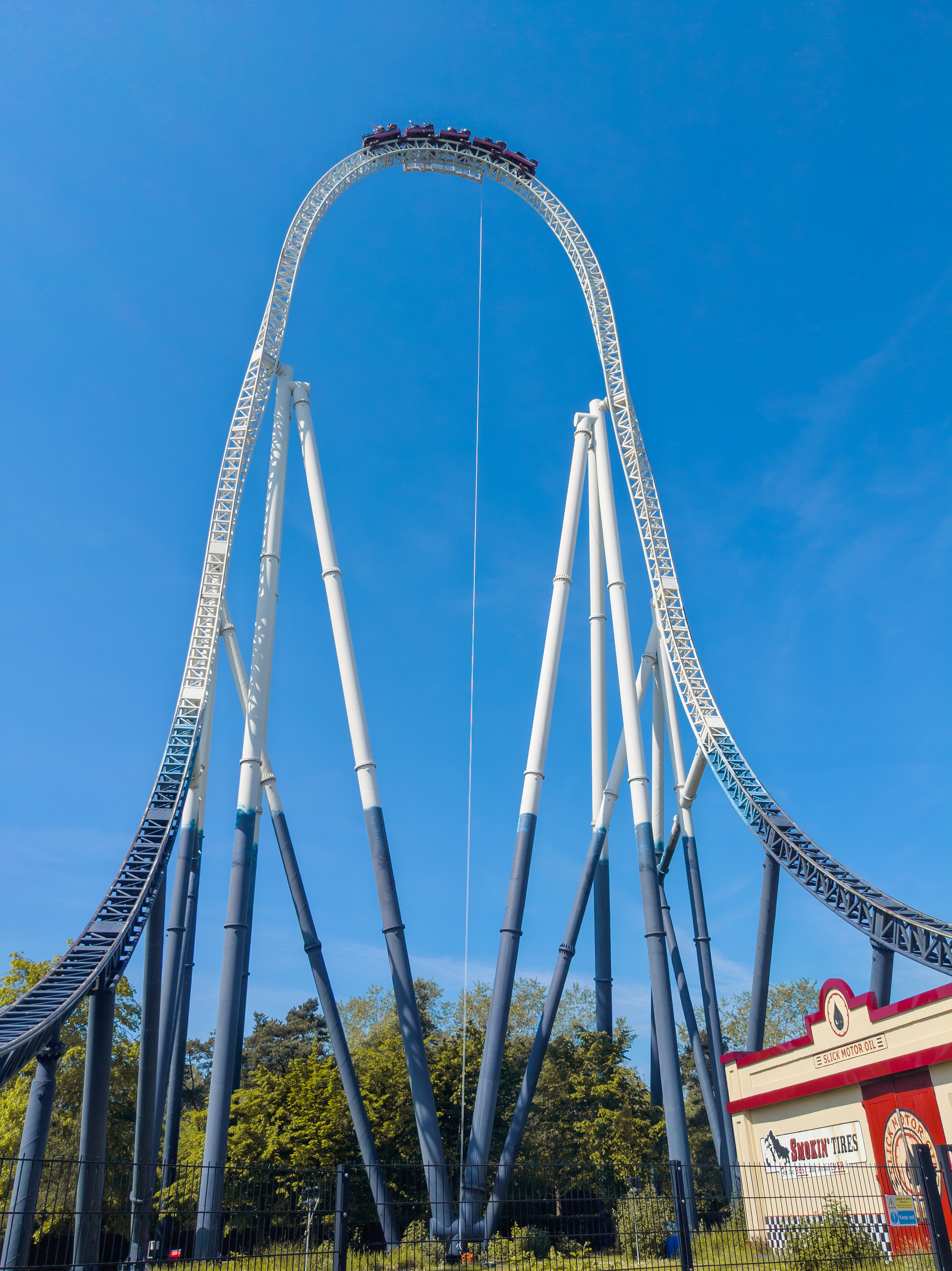
- Stealth in 2024

Thorpe Park
- Location: Thorpe Park
- Park section: Amity Speedway
- Coordinates: 51.405°N 0.515278°W
- Status: Operating
- Opening date: 15 March 2006
- Cost: £12 Million

General statistics
- Type: Steel – Launched
- Manufacturer: Intamin
- Designer: Werner Stengel
- Model: Accelerator Coaster
- Lift/launch system: Hydraulic Launch
- Height: 62.5 m (205 ft)
- Length: 400.0 m (1,312.3 ft)
- Speed: 80 mph (129 km/h)
- Inversions: 0
- Max vertical angle: 90°
- Capacity: 1000 riders per hour
- G-force: 4.7
- Height restriction: 140–196 cm (4 ft 7 in – 6 ft 5 in)
- Trains: 3 trains with 5 cars; riders arranged 2 across in 2 rows for a total of 20 riders per train
- Theme: Speedway
- Website: Official website
- Fastrack available
- Wheelchair accessible
- Must transfer from wheelchair
- Stealth at RCDB

Stealth is a hydraulically launched steel roller coaster located in the Amity area of Thorpe Park in Surrey, England. Designed and manufactured by Intamin of Switzerland at a cost of £12 million, the Accelerator Coaster opened in 2006. Upon its opening, it was the fastest roller coaster in the United Kingdom, a record later surpassed by another Thorpe Park coaster, Hyperia, in 2024.

In 2021, following the closure of Do-Dodonpa, Stealth became the fastest accelerating roller coaster in the world, accelerating from 0 to 80 mph in 1.8 seconds. It is also the third tallest roller coaster in the UK, after Hyperia and The Big One at Blackpool Pleasure Beach. It reaches a height of 62.5 metres (205 ft) and reaches a top speed of 80 mph (129 km/h). Riders experience a maximum of 4.7 g.

== Ride experience ==
As the train enters the loading platform, a pre-boarding announcement instructs riders to secure their restraints before the boarding gates open. In the background, the sounds of a car engine revving and a pit crew performing maintenance create an immersive atmosphere. A recorded voice directs riders to “Place your heads back, face forwards, hold on tight and brace yourselves!”

Once boarding is complete, the launch sequence begins. The train rolls forward and backward to engage with the catch-car while the brake fins on the launch track retract in two stages. During the countdown, the voice repeats the safety instructions as five sets of red traffic lights above the train illuminate sequentially. When the lights turn green, the voice enthusiastically shouts “Go, Go, Go!”, and the train is launched, accelerating rapidly from 0 to 80 mph (130 km/h).

The train ascends the 62.5-metre (205 ft) top hat, turning 90 degrees to the left before the crest. After cresting, it turns another 90 degrees to the left, descends to the base of the top hat, and continues over a final airtime hill. The train then enters the brake run, slowing before returning to the unload station, where riders are instructed to release their restraints.

During previous events, different launch announcements have been used:

- During Carnival, the countdown was done in the style of a Carnival display.
- During Oktoberfest, the countdown was done in German.
- During Fright Nights, a more spooky announcement was used.

== Rollbacks ==
Intamin roller coasters featuring a top hat element, such as Stealth, may occasionally experience a rollback. This occurs when a launched train fails to clear the top hat, typically due to adverse weather conditions such as low temperatures, strong winds, or precipitation, which can reduce the train's speed. The launch track is equipped with retractable brake fins that deploy after the initial launch to safely stop the train in the event of a rollback. The train is then relaunched with sufficient power to successfully traverse the top hat. Following a rollback, the capacity of each train may be temporarily reduced until conditions improve.

== 2024 revamp ==
For the 2024 season, the station and entrance areas of Stealth were completely repainted, and the ride's theming was enhanced as part of the Sparkle Project, an ongoing initiative aimed at refreshing and revitalizing the park.

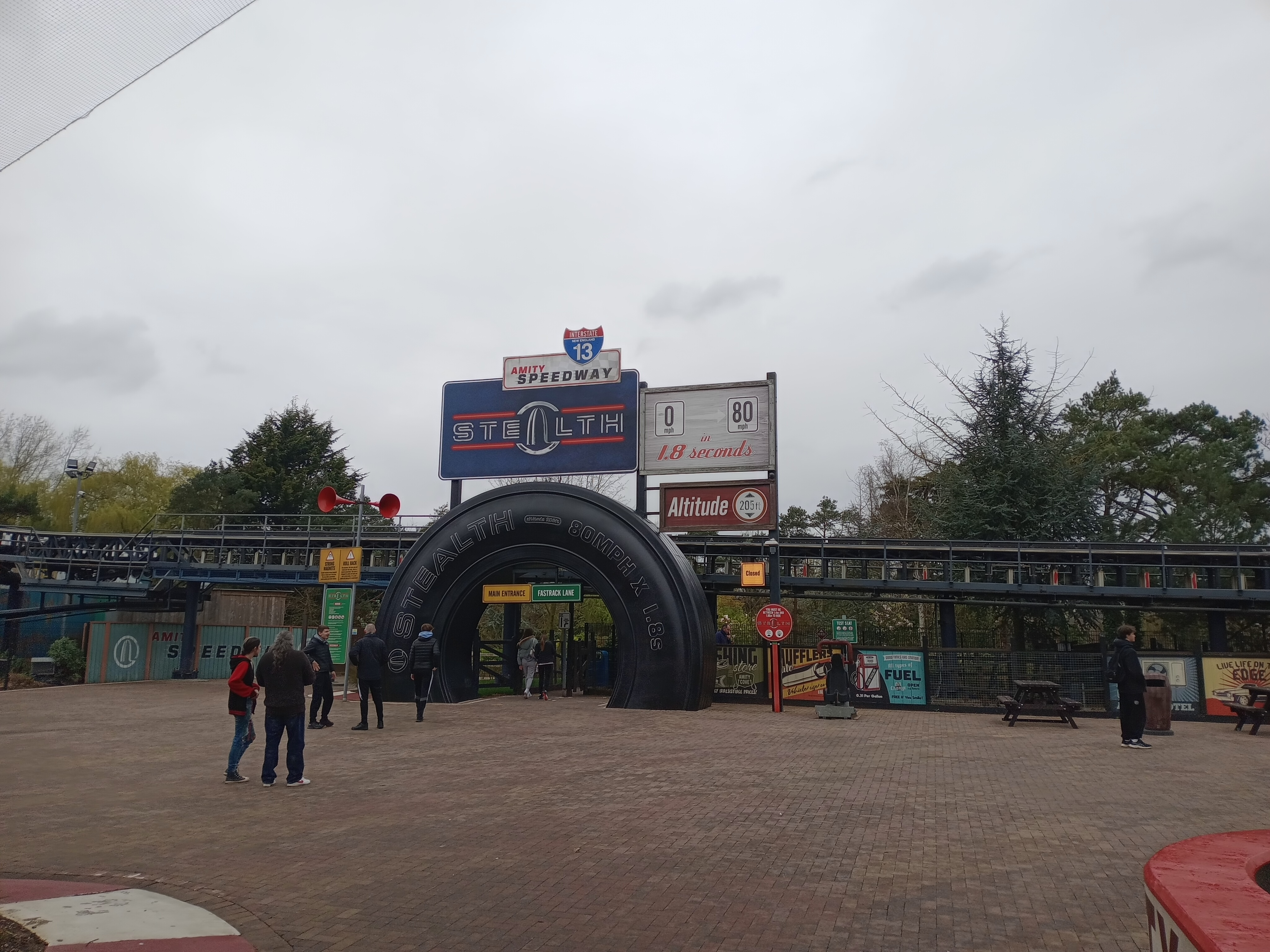
Stealth's entrance in 2024

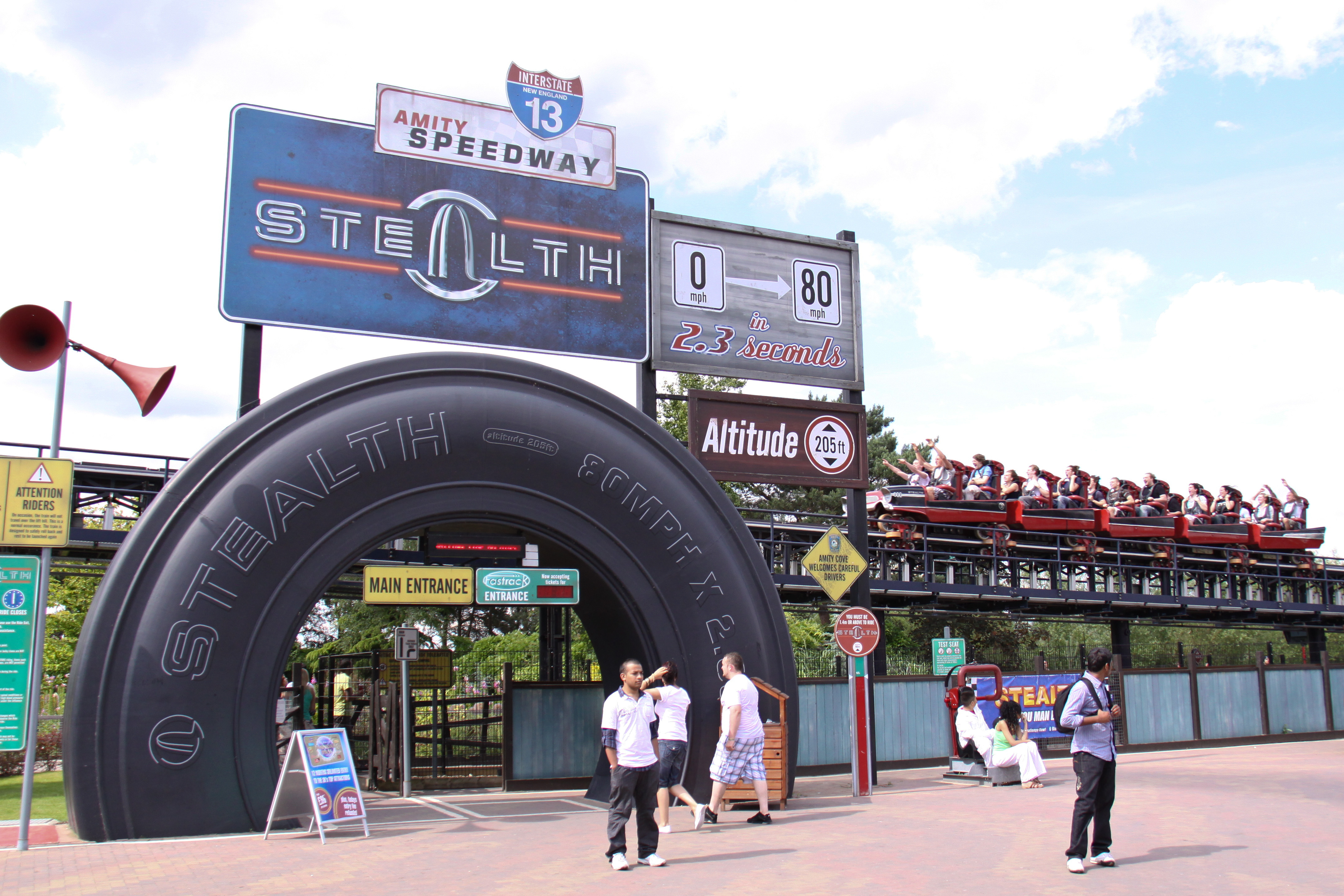
Stealth's entrance in 2009

== Records held ==
Preceded by Do-Dodonpa	World's Fastest Accelerating Roller Coaster; August 12, 2021 – present	Succeeded by Current holder
