= Formula Rossa =

Roller coaster at Ferrari World

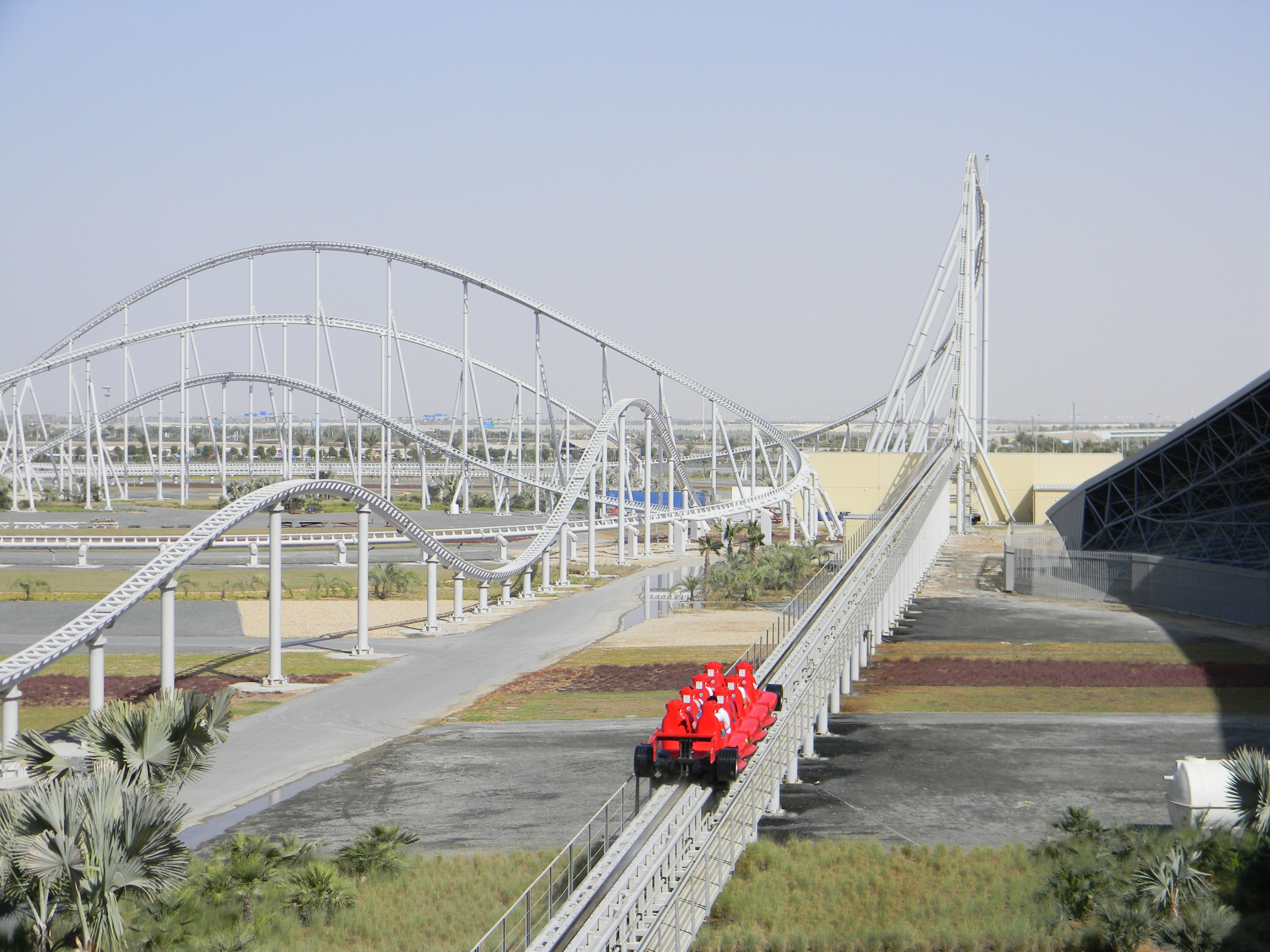

Ferrari World Abu Dhabi
- Location: Ferrari World Abu Dhabi
- Park section: Racing Zone
- Coordinates: 24°29′3.1014″N 54°36′44.7546″E
- Status: Closed
- Opening date: 4 November 2010

General statistics
- Type: Steel – Launched
- Manufacturer: Intamin
- Designer: Jack Rouse Associates
- Model: Accelerator Coaster
- Lift/launch system: Hydraulic Launch Track
- Height: 52 m (170.6 ft)
- Length: 2,074 m (6,804 ft)
- Speed: 240 km/h (149.1 mph)
- Inversions: 0
- Duration: 1:32
- Capacity: 625 riders per hour
- Acceleration: 0 to 240 km/h (0 to 149 mph) in 4.9 seconds
- G-force: 4.8
- Height restriction: 140–200 cm (4 ft 7 in – 6 ft 7 in)
- Trains: 4 trains with 4 cars; riders arranged 2 across in 2 rows for a total of 16 riders per train
- Website: Official website
- Formula Rossa at RCDB

Formula Rossa (Arabic: فورمولا روسا) is a launched roller coaster located at Ferrari World in Abu Dhabi, United Arab Emirates. Manufactured by Intamin, the ride set a speed record when it opened on 4 November 2010, and became the fastest roller coaster in the world upon opening with a maximum speed of 240 km/h (149.1 mph). It surpassed Kingda Ka at Six Flags Great Adventure, which had held the record since 2005. In addition to its top speed, the coaster propels riders from 0 to 100 km/h (62 mph) in approximately two seconds and reaches its maximum speed in 4.9 seconds. The record was surpassed by Falcons Flight on 31 December 2025, which reaches a maximum speed of up to 250 km/h (155 mph).

Formula Rossa is themed to Formula One racing, and unlike other Accelerator Coaster models that were built before, the ride employs a unique cooling system to combat the hot climate of Abu Dhabi.

== History ==
Ferrari World Abu Dhabi (FWAD), an indoor theme park located on Yas Island in Abu Dhabi, United Arab Emirates, announced in May 2010 that they were building the world's fastest roller coaster. Revealed as Formula Rossa originally scheduled to open 28 October 2010, the steel coaster would be manufactured by Intamin and designed by Jack Rouse Associates (JRA). The ride utilizes a hydraulic launch capable of 20,800 hp that can propel each train from 0 to 100 km/h (62 mph) in approximately two seconds. According to the park's director of maintenance, Wayne Meadows, aircraft carriers launch fighter jets in a similar way, and the length of the launch on Formula Rossa is 400 metres (1,300 ft). Passengers are propelled from an air-conditioned interior to the desert and navigate a 2.07-kilometre-long (1.29-mile) track layout. Meadows explained that the ride's "dramatic performance" requires passengers to wear goggles, since Abu Dhabi is "subject to heavy sand and dust storms".

Ferrari's connection to Formula One racing is central to the theme of Formula Rossa. In a promotional video, FWAD general manager Claus Frimand noted that, "The idea is to bring the sensation to people of what a Formula One driver is experiencing." When speaking with Park World, park manager Andy Keeling shared his opinion that "speed" wasn't the most important aspect adding, "It's also about knowing what it's like [to] experience the emotion and intensity of being in a Formula 1 race." In another interview, he also emphasized the 52-metre (171 ft) hill and tight-turn elements that help recreate the feeling of being inside a high-performance race car.

The hydraulically-driven portion of the launch design is similar to other Intamin Accelerator Coaster models, although Formula Rossa employs unique features to counter the intense summer heat that can climb as high as 50 °C (122 °F) in Abu Dhabi. Between rides, each of the 16-seater trains is sprayed with water by the integrated cooling system, which targets the running gear. This has the added benefit of also removing sand from the wheels.

On 27 October 2010, Ferrari World announced that the opening date would be postponed a week "in respect of the passing of the late Sheikh Saqr bin Mohammed Al Qasimi, the Ruler of Ras Al Khaimah". Formula Rossa officially opened to the public on 4 November 2010, surpassing Kingda Ka at Six Flags Great Adventure to become the fastest roller coaster in the world with its record-setting top speed of 240 km/h (149.1 mph).

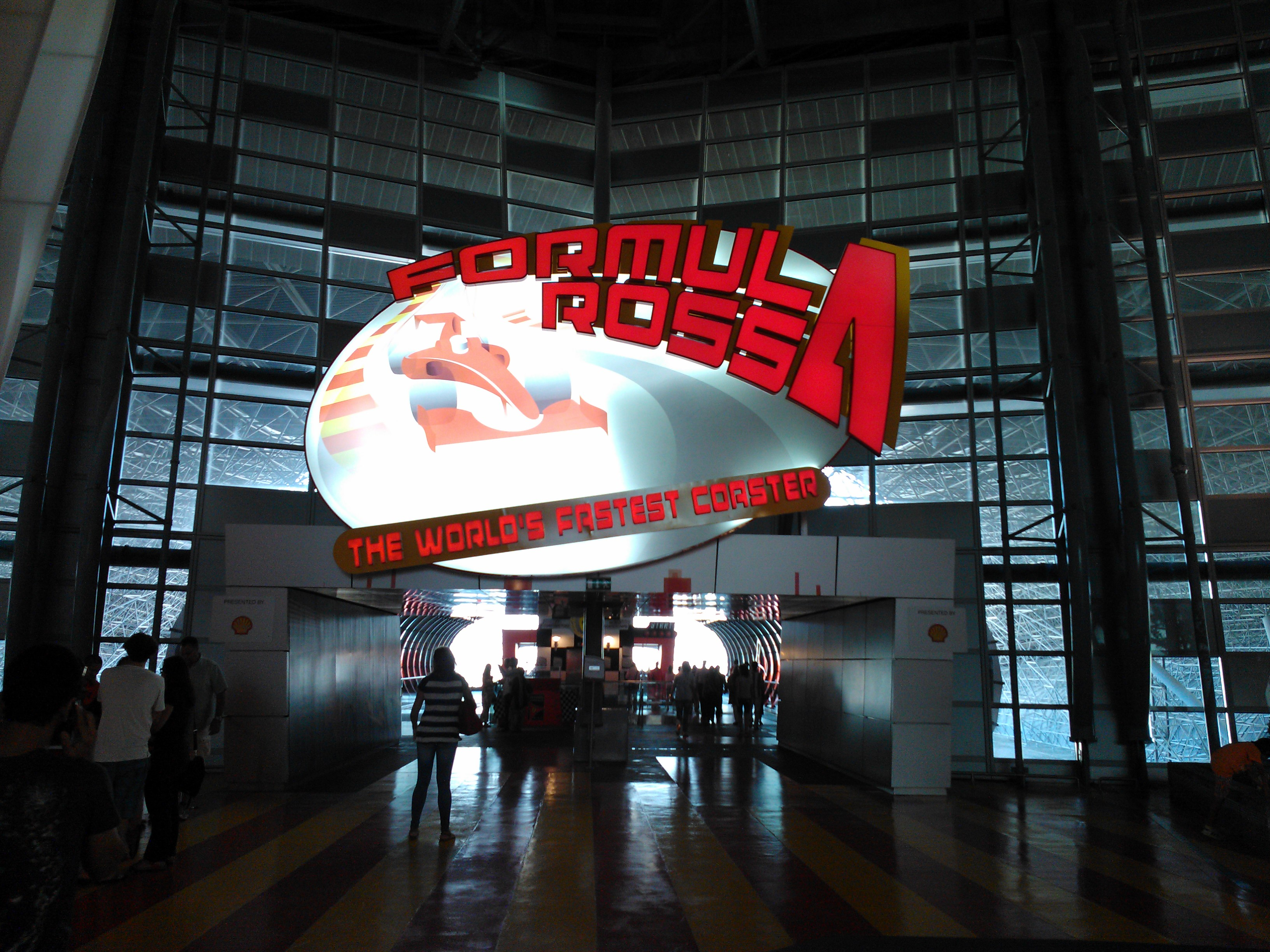
Old signage used for the ride.

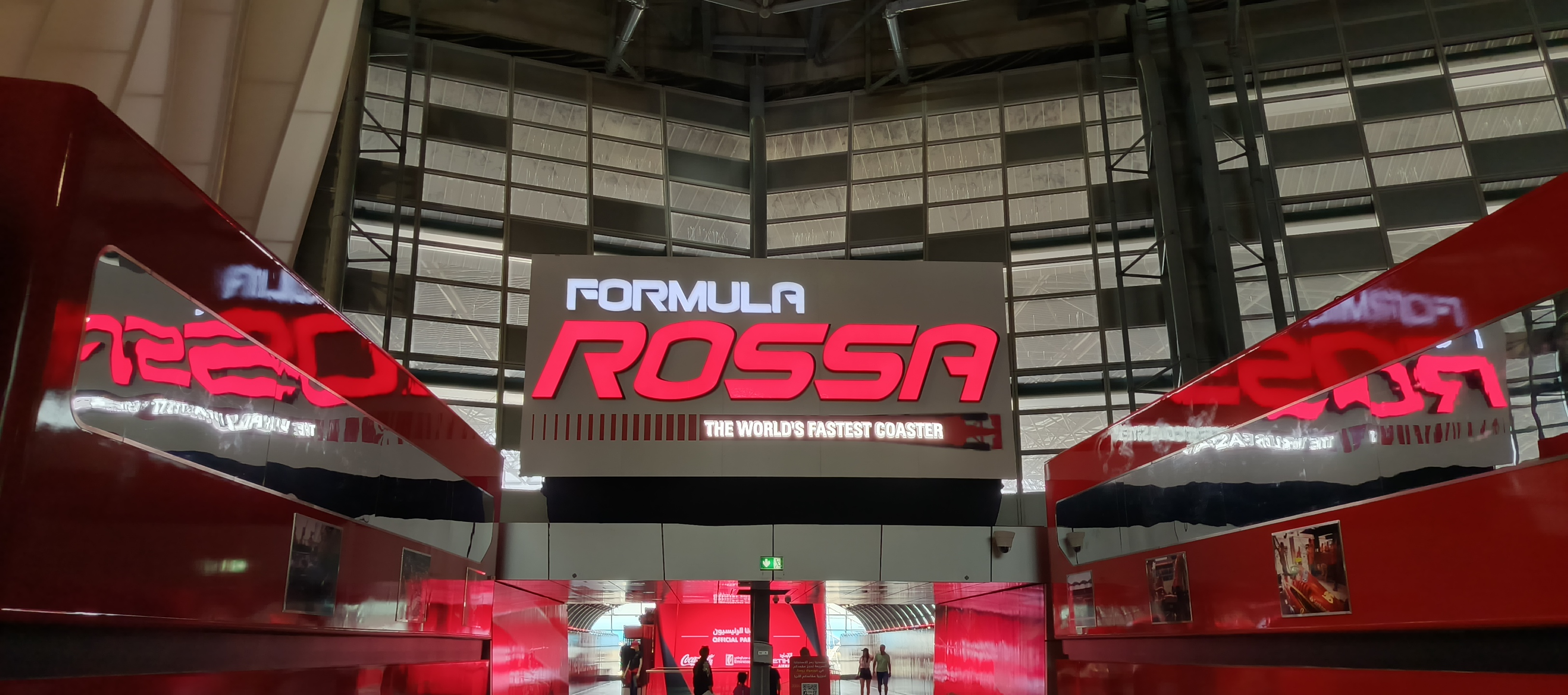
Current signage used for the ride as of 2025.

In January 2024, Ferrari World unexpectedly closed Formula Rossa without explanation, stating on their website that the ride is "unavailable until further notice". The ride would later reopen on 23 December 2024. The ride closed “for maintenance” on 12 May 2026 and has been closed ever since.

== Ride description ==
The coaster train accelerates to its top speed of 240 km/h (149.1 mph) in 4.9 seconds using a hydraulic launch system. Riders experience up to 1.7 g-force during acceleration, and throughout the course of the ride may experience up to 4.8 g. The roller co track is 2.07 km (1.29 mi) in length, ranking second in the world among steel roller coasters behind Japan's Steel Dragon 2000. Its shape was inspired by the Italian racetrack Autodromo Nazionale di Monza. Riders are required to wear safety goggles to protect from airborne particles such as dust. For safety reasons, Formula Rossa has a height restriction (140-195 cm) in place.

== Records held ==
Preceded by Kingda Ka	World's Fastest Roller Coaster; 4 November 2010 – 31 December 2025	Succeeded by Falcons Flight
