= SpeedMonster =

Roller coaster at TusenFryd, Norway

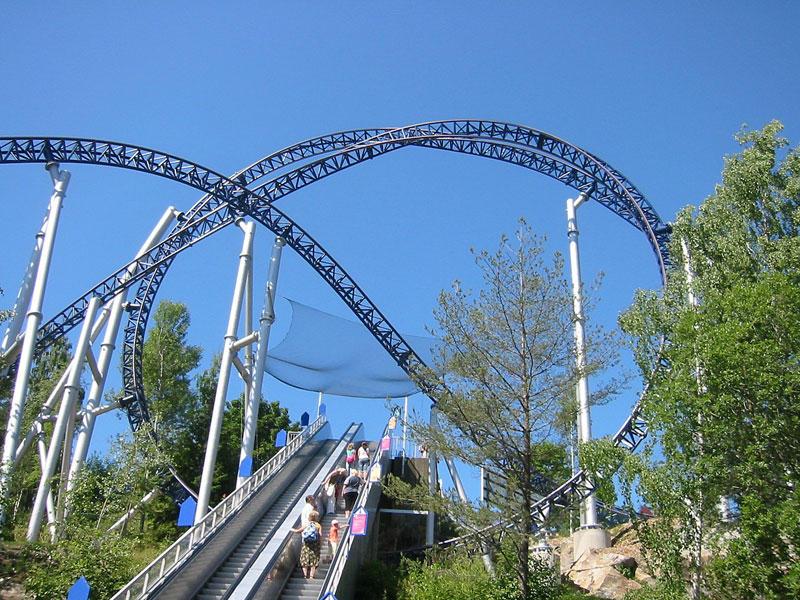
- SpeedMonster in 2013

Tusenfryd
- Location: Tusenfryd
- Coordinates: 59.748226°N 10.777019°E
- Status: Operating
- Opening date: April 23, 2006
- Cost: €7.5 million

General statistics
- Type: Steel – Launched
- Manufacturer: Intamin
- Designer: Stengel Engineering
- Model: Accelerator coaster
- Lift/launch system: Hydraulic launch
- Height: 131 ft (40 m)
- Length: 2,264 ft (690 m)
- Speed: 55.9 mph (90.0 km/h)
- Inversions: 3
- Duration: 1:09
- Capacity: 700 riders per hour
- Acceleration: 0 to 55.9 mph (0 to 90 km/h) in 2.2 seconds
- G-force: 4
- Height restriction: 55 in (140 cm)
- SpeedMonster at RCDB

SpeedMonster is a launched roller coaster located at the Norwegian theme park, Tusenfryd. Built by Swiss manufacturer Intamin, the ride opened in 2006 and features a rare element known as a "Norwegian Loop".

== History ==
The ride was announced on July 7, 2005 and was revealed to be Tusenfryd's biggest investment in its history, at a cost of 60 million kroner (about €7.5 million). It was also announced that the ride would feature a hydraulic launch and three inversions.

Due to the park's unique topography, the ride is partially located upon a 20 metre high rock slope and weaves its way through trees. The harsh climate and rocky location made construction difficult, with areas of soft earth requiring deeper foundations. Construction was completed in December 2005 in icy conditions. Soon after completion, heavy snowfall left drifts of 1 metre in the area, which would have held up construction had the ride not been complete.

Since its opening, SpeedMonster has been sponsored by Mazda, tying in with the race car theming present throughout the ride.

== Ride experience ==
Each of the two racing car themed trains consists of three cars, each with four seats for a capacity of 12 riders per train. Upon leaving the station, riders are accelerated from 0 to 55.9 miles per hour in 2.2 seconds before negotiating the 630 metres (2,067 ft) long course. SpeedMonster is the world's first roller coaster to feature a "Norwegian Loop", an element which inverts riders twice and wraps around Tusenfryd's unusual entrance escalators.
