= Accelerator Coaster =

Roller coaster model by Intamin

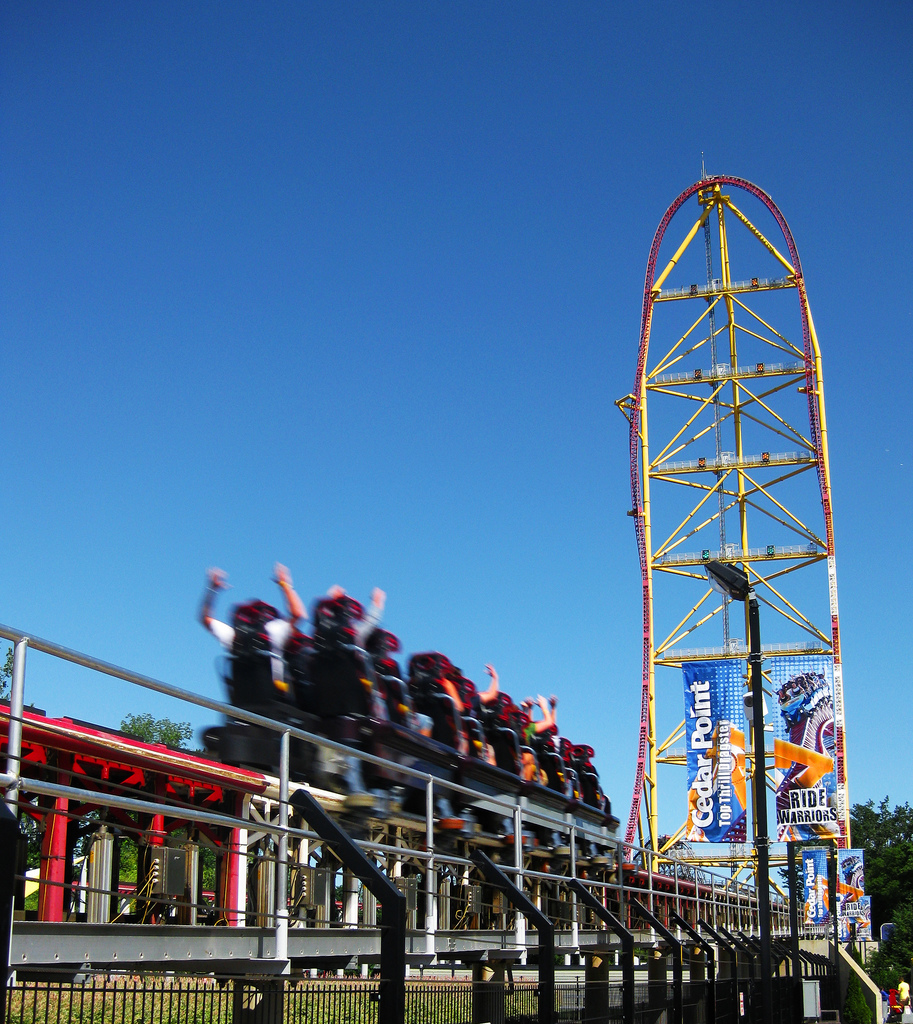
- Top Thrill Dragster at Cedar Point
- Status: Discontinued
- First manufactured: 2002
- No. of installations: 15
- Manufacturer: Intamin
- Restraint Style: Over-the-shoulder, Lap-bar

An Accelerator Coaster is a hydraulically launched roller coaster model from Intamin. The model usually consists of a long, straight launch track, a top hat tower element, and magnetic brakes that smoothly stop the train without making contact. The technology was developed by Intamin engineers as an alternative to electromagnetic launch systems, such as the linear induction motor (LIM) and linear synchronous motor (LSM), that are found on earlier launched roller coasters like the Flight of Fear and The Joker's Jinx. Unlike the earlier linear induction motors, the Accelerator Coaster's launch system exhibits constant acceleration and is capable of reaching greater speeds. Formula Rossa, formerly the world's fastest coaster, and Kingda Ka, the now defunct former world's tallest, are some of the most well-known installations around the world.

Accelerator Coasters have a great track record for safety and are extremely power efficient, especially compared to older technologies such as the classic chain lift found on most roller coasters. The coaster will occasionally perform a rollback – when the train is unable to complete the track peak and rolls back to the starting point in a safely controlled manner – which can occur due to a number of different factors.

However, Accelerator roller coasters have been infamous for long terms of mechanical issues with the launch system. Examples of these include Xcelerator at Knott's Berry Farm or the former Top Thrill Dragster at Cedar Point.

As of 2025, Accelerator Coasters are no longer being produced, with the final installation having opened in 2010.

== Technology ==
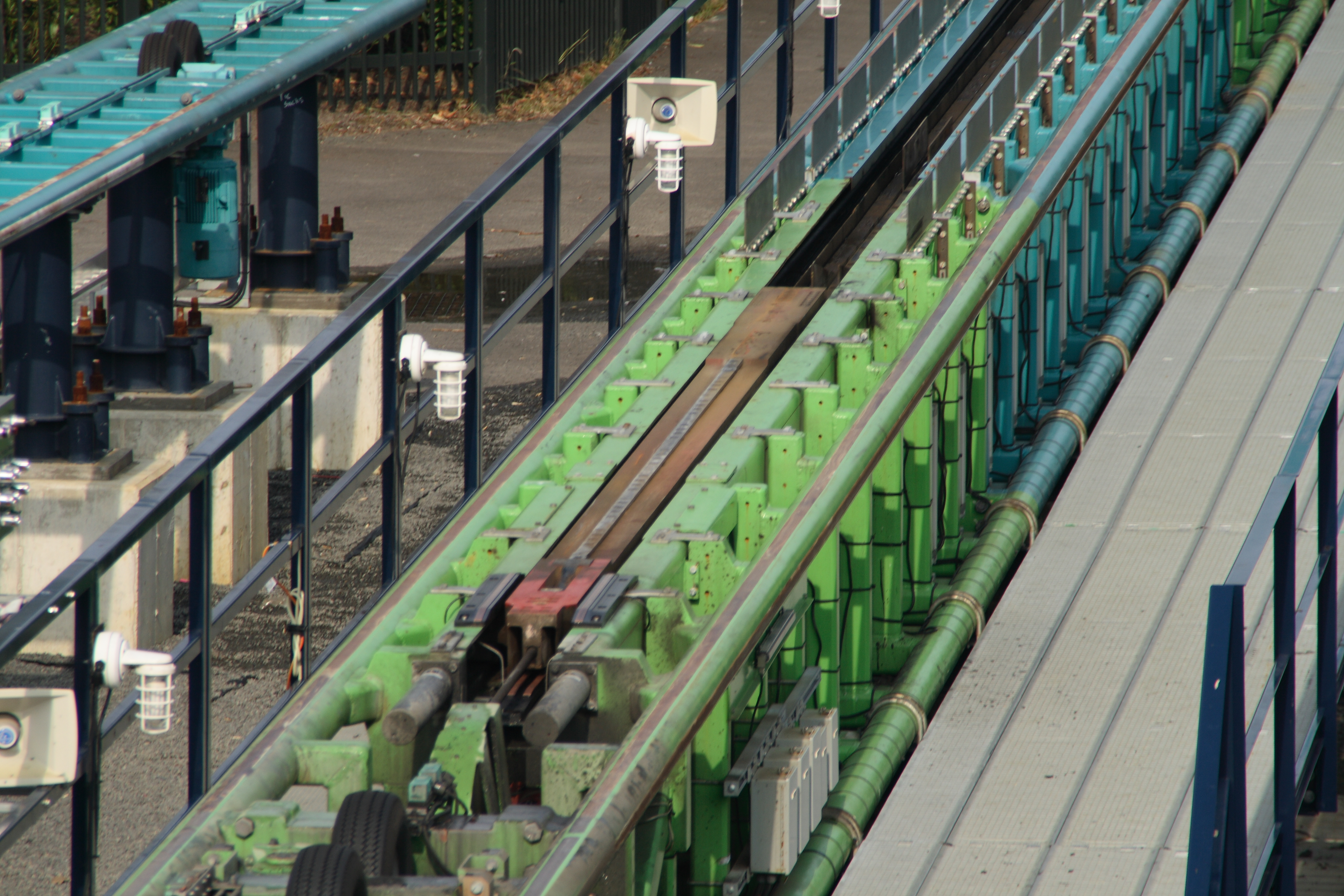
The catch-car on Kingda Ka.

An Accelerator Coaster's launch system operates on the same basic principle as a Super Soaker, but on a much larger scale. The coaster's power source is several hydraulic pumps, each capable of producing 500 horsepower (370 kW). These pumps push hydraulic fluid into several accumulators. These accumulators are divided into two compartments by a movable piston, one side filled with hydraulic fluid and the other with nitrogen gas. The nitrogen is held in large tanks directly beneath the actual accumulator. As the hydraulic fluid fills the accumulators, it pushes on the pistons, compressing the nitrogen. It takes approximately 45 seconds to pressurize the accumulators with all pumps operating. All of this pressure is released during each launch, which typically lasts between 2 and 4 seconds.

The heart of the launch system is a large winch, around which the launch cables are wound. This winch is driven by hydraulic turbines. The two launch cables are attached to the winch on its ends, and run through two grooves on top of the launch track. The cables are attached to the sides of the catch-car, which runs in a trough between the grooves. A third, single retractor cable is attached to the rear of the catch-car, it runs around a pulley wheel at the rear end of the launch track and returns to the hydraulic building along the bottom of the launch track, where it is wound in the opposing direction on the winch's drum.

The train connects to the catch-car with a solid piece of metal known as a "launch dog" that drops down from the center car. The launch dog is normally retracted and is held in place by a small magnet, but the launch area has electrical contacts that demagnetize the magnet and cause the launch dog to drop down. The launch dog drops down at an angle, similar to the chain dog that a lifted coaster uses to connect to the lift chain.

Once the train and catch-car are in position and all is clear, the operator presses the "Launch" button and the launch sequence begins:

1. The train's launch dog is released.
2. The drive tires that advance the train to the launch track retract. Because the launch track is sloped slightly upwards, the train rolls backwards a few inches, until it is stopped by the launch dog engaging the catch-car.
3. The anti-rollback magnetic brakes on the launch track retract.
4. Approximately five seconds later, the launch valves in the hydraulic room open. The compressed nitrogen in the accumulators forces the hydraulic fluid into the turbines that drive the winch. As the winch winds in the launch cables, the retractor cable is unwound from the winch. After the train moves off the electrical contacts in the launch area, its launch dog is held down only by the force of the accelerating catch-car.
5. Each section of brakes on the launch track pops back up immediately after the train passes a proximity switch.
6. When the train reaches full speed and all the pressure in the accumulators has been released, the catch-car, still connected to the train, enters its braking zone. The catch-car uses the same braking configuration as the train, but is much lighter, so it slows down very quickly. As the catch-car begins to slow down, the train's launch dog retracts - the shape where it drops into is a "v" shape, so the dog is forced back into position as it runs over the catch-car and is held in place by the magnet, as the train continues on its way.
7. Once the catch-car has stopped, the launch system resets - the winch reverses direction, returning the catch-car to the launch area using the third retractor cable, and the pumps begin recharging the accumulators. This normally takes about 45 seconds, after which the next train can be launched.

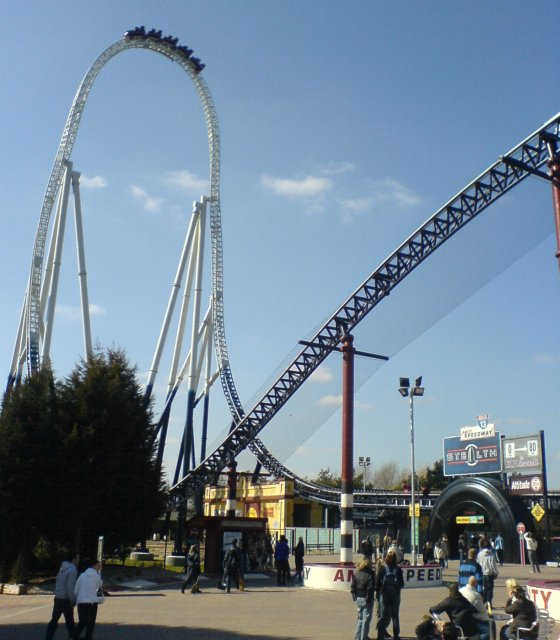
Stealth at Thorpe Park

If the train rolls back, it will be brought to a near stop (magnetic brakes cannot completely stop a train) well before the beginning of the launch track. Regardless of the position of the catch-car when the train passes it going backwards, there will be no interference as the train's launch dog will be retracted. After the train slows to a near stop, the brakes will be cycled up and down to control the train's speed until it is back in launch position. On the larger coasters, this "launch reset" process can take more than a minute as the train must be moved very slowly. Once the train is back in launch position, it can be launched again or can be returned to the station.

The basic launch sequence is often accompanied by various theme elements. The most common is "starting lights" that cycle down from yellow to green, the green light coming on just as the train begins to accelerate.

The number of pumps, accumulators, and turbines varies with the speed the coaster is designed to achieve. Matugani, the slowest of the Accelerator Coasters, has a design speed of 47 mph (76 km/h), one pump, one accumulator, and eight turbines.

Kingda Ka, the world's former second fastest roller coaster, had a design speed of 128 mph (206 km/h), seven pumps, four accumulators, and 32 turbines. The system as a whole was capable of producing up to 20,800 horsepower (15.5 MW) for each launch, although a typical launch used less than 10,000 horsepower (7,500 kW).

The catch-car is stopped by magnetic brakes identical to those used to stop the train. In order to give the catch-car room to slow down, only about three quarters of the launch track can actually be used to launch the train; a catch-car on a 100 km/h Accelerator Coaster needs 64 feet/20m to stop, and more on faster coasters like Kingda Ka.

=== Advantages ===
One major advantage of this launch system compared to others is its low power consumption. The hydraulic pumps run constantly and actually use less energy than most chain lift drive motors. An Accelerator Coaster's hydraulic launch system also provides constant acceleration, unlike the acceleration from electromagnetic linear induction motors which begins to decrease or trail off after the initial push.

== Restraints ==
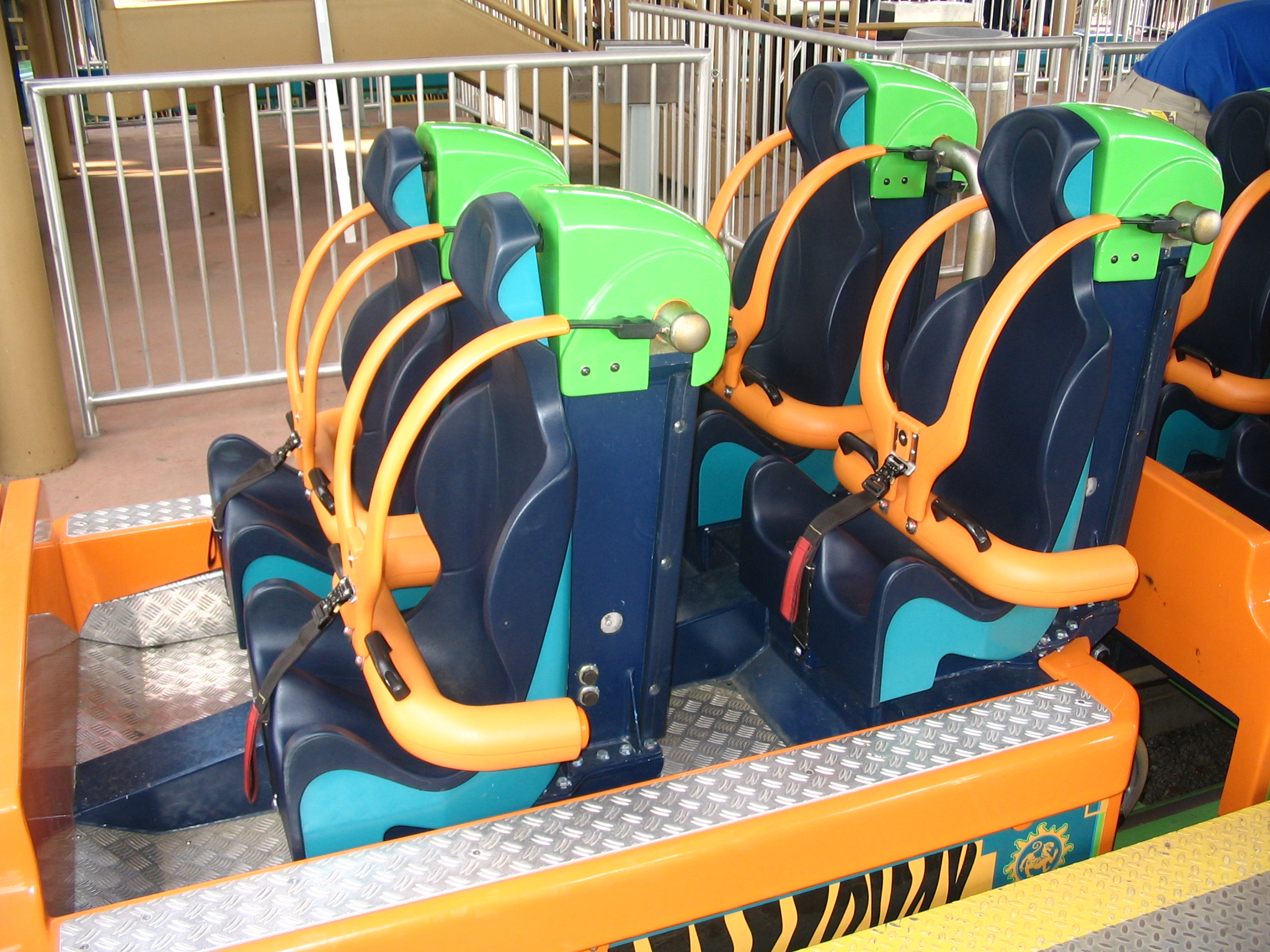
OTSR design on Kingda Ka similar to other Accelerator Coasters

Most Accelerator Coasters use restraints that consist of a U-shaped lap bar that locks into place. The restraint system features an over-the-shoulder restraint (OTSR) harness designed for comfort and fast loading times. Only three Accelerator Coasters have a lap bar restraint without the over-the-shoulder harness - Xcelerator, Top Thrill Dragster and Formula Rossa.

Another notable feature is the locking system, which uses two hydraulic cylinders for redundancy (in case one fails) rather than relying on the older ratchet design. While a ratchet-based restraint locks at one of several positions that can be too loose or uncomfortably tight, the hydraulic system allows the restraints to be pulled down and locked in any position to better match a rider's body dimensions. In the extremely unlikely case where both locking cylinders fail, the restraints are still held down by a seat belt.

The newer over-the-shoulder design allows for faster load times, as opposed to lap bars. With lap-bar designs, riders must rely on a seat belt around their waist as a backup restraint. It must be checked first by ride attendants before the lap bar can be lowered and checked, significantly slowing load times. In contrast, the over-the-shoulder restraints are held down with a seatbelt on the outside of the primary restraint. This means that guests can pull down their own restraints and buckle their own belts saving ride attendants time by checking both simultaneously.

For trains that have the over-the-shoulder design, it is possible to swap out the hard, plastic straps that connect the primary bar originally installed to the pivot point with softer cushioned straps.

== Variations ==
Most Accelerator Coasters are launched from the station, but there are some that advance the train to a separate launch area, either for theming reasons (Superman Escape) or to allow multiple trains to be loaded simultaneously (Top Thrill Dragster and Kingda Ka). For layouts that have the top hat element, a mechanism is in place to deal with the occasional occurrence of rollbacks where a train fails to pass the peak height of the element and rolls backwards returning to the point of launch. A set of retractable magnetic brakes also found at the final brake run exist on the launch track to stop the train during a rollback.

== List of Accelerator Coasters ==
Name	Height	Speed	Park, Location	Year opened	Year closed	Status
Desert Race	63 ft (19 m)	62.1 mph (99.9 km/h)	Heide Park, Germany	2007		Operating
Formula Rossa	170 ft (52 m)	149.1 mph (240.0 km/h)	Ferrari World, Abu Dhabi, United Arab Emirates	2010		SBNO
Furius Baco	46 ft (14 m)	83.9 mph (135.0 km/h)	PortAventura Park, Spain	2007		Operating
Matugani; Formerly Kanonen (2005-2016)	79 ft (24 m)	47 mph (76 km/h)	Lost Island Theme Park, Iowa	2005		Operating
Kingda Ka	456 ft (139 m)	128 mph (206 km/h)	Six Flags Great Adventure, New Jersey	2005	2024	Removed
Rita	69 ft (21 m)	61.1 mph (98.3 km/h)	Alton Towers, England	2005		Operating
ThunderVolt; Formerly Senzafiato	59 ft (18 m)	56 mph (90 km/h)	Playland (Vancouver), Canada	2009	2018 Converted 2024	Converted to LSM Launch
Skycar	112 ft (34 m)	57 mph (92 km/h)	Mysterious Island, China	2005		SBNO
Speed Monster	131 ft (40 m)	56 mph (90 km/h)	TusenFryd, Norway	2006		Operating
Stealth	205 ft (62 m)	80 mph (130 km/h)	Thorpe Park, England	2006		Operating
Storm Runner	150 ft (46 m)	72 mph (116 km/h)	Hersheypark, Pennsylvania	2004		Operating
Superman Escape	131 ft (40 m)	62 mph (100 km/h)	Warner Bros. Movie World, Australia	2005		Operating
Top Thrill 2 Formerly Top Thrill Dragster	420 ft (130 m)	120 mph (190 km/h)	Cedar Point, Ohio	2003	2021 Converted 2024	Converted to LSM Swing Launch
Xcelerator	205 ft (62 m)	82 mph (132 km/h)	Knott's Berry Farm, California	2002		Operating
Zaturn	213 ft (65 m)	80.3 mph (129.2 km/h)	Space World, Japan	2006	2017	Removed
