= Kingda Ka =

Defunct roller coaster in New Jersey

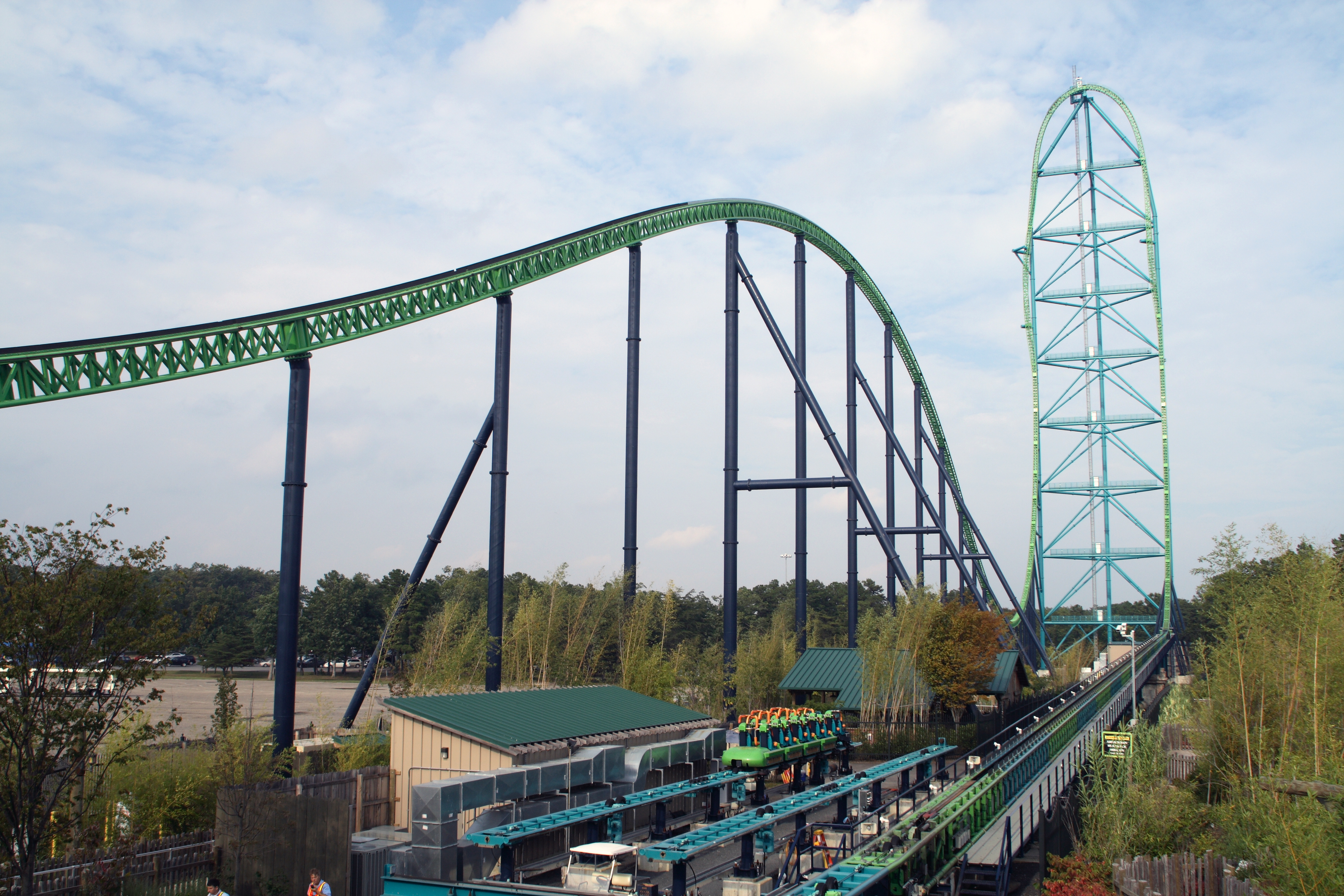
- Kingda Ka prior to Zumanjaro: Drop of Doom addition (2006)

Six Flags Great Adventure
- Location: Six Flags Great Adventure
- Park section: The Golden Kingdom
- Coordinates: 40°08′21.18″N 74°26′11.39″W
- Status: Removed
- Soft opening date: May 19, 2005
- Opening date: May 21, 2005
- Closing date: November 10, 2024
- Cost: $25 million

General statistics
- Type: Steel – Launched
- Manufacturer: Intamin
- Designer: Werner Stengel
- Model: Accelerator Coaster
- Lift/launch system: Hydraulic launch
- Height: 456 ft (139 m)
- Drop: 418 ft (127 m)
- Length: 3,118 ft (950 m)
- Speed: 128 mph (206 km/h)
- Inversions: 0
- Duration: 0:28
- Max vertical angle: 90°
- Capacity: 1400 riders per hour
- Acceleration: 0 to 128 mph (0 to 206 km/h) in 3.5 seconds
- Height restriction: 54–77 in (137–196 cm)
- Trains: 4 trains with 5 cars each. Riders were seated 2 across in 2 rows, with only 1 row in the last car, for a total of 18 riders per train.
- Flash Pass was available
- Kingda Ka at RCDB

Video

Kingda Ka was a hydraulically-launched steel roller coaster located at Six Flags Great Adventure in Jackson, New Jersey, United States. Manufactured by Intamin and designed by Werner Stengel, Kingda Ka opened as the tallest and fastest roller coaster in the world on May 21, 2005, surpassing Top Thrill Dragster at Cedar Point. Although both featured similar designs, Kingda Ka's layout added an airtime hill on the return portion of the track. It was also the second strata coaster ever built, exceeding 400 feet (120 m) in height.

The ride used a hydraulic launch mechanism to accelerate the train up to 128 mph (206 km/h) in 3.5 seconds. While Formula Rossa at Ferrari World broke its speed record in 2010, Kingda Ka remained the tallest in the world throughout its operational lifespan. The record-breaking coaster featured a 456-foot-tall (139 m) top hat tower with a 418-foot (127 m) drop, which separately ranked as the longest drop in the world.

In November 2024, following months of rumors and speculation regarding the future of the attraction, Six Flags Great Adventure announced that Kingda Ka had permanently closed. The ride was demolished and removed from the park.

== History ==
Kingda Ka was officially unveiled on September 29, 2004, and was scheduled to open at Six Flags Great Adventure in 2005. The announcement was made at a media event held for roller coaster enthusiasts and the press. Six Flags billed the new ride as "the tallest and fastest roller coaster on earth", with a height of 456 feet (139 m) and the ability to accelerate to 128 mph (206 km/h) in 3.5 seconds.

The ride would be part of a new themed area called the Golden Kingdom, an 11-acre (4.5 ha) section already under development in the park. Six Flags CEO Kieran Burke at the time stated, "This is the first step in a process of really transforming Six Flags Great Adventure from the largest regional theme park in the world to a true regional destination."

=== Construction and opening ===
Intamin subcontracted Stakotra to assist with construction. On January 13, 2005, workers completed Kingda Ka's tower with a topping out ceremony. For the ceremony, a 50-story crane was used to hoist two workers to the top of the ride, while another crane lifted a 9,000-pound (4,100 kg) steel beam with a mounted American flag to the ride's pinnacle. The ride was still under construction when the park opened for the season in March 2005. Originally scheduled to open on April 23, 2005, Kingda Ka's opening was delayed to May 21 to allow for more time to complete testing. A media event was held two days prior on May 19, 2005.

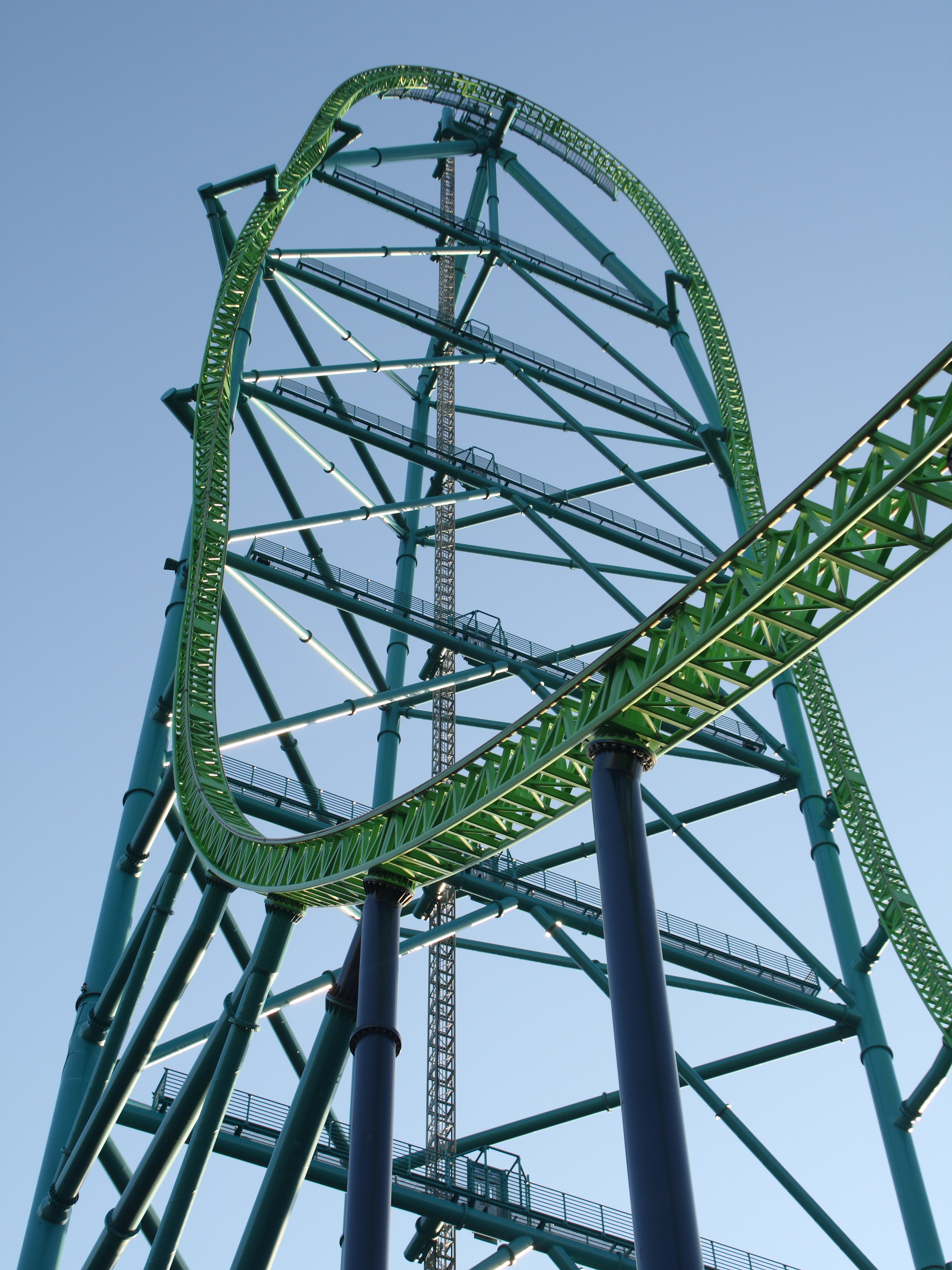
Kingda Ka's tower

Upon opening, Kingda Ka became the tallest and fastest roller coaster in the world, taking both world records from Top Thrill Dragster at Cedar Point. Intamin designed both roller coasters, which share a similar design and layout, although Kingda Ka adds an airtime hill on the return portion of the track. Both rides were built by Stakotra and installed by Martin & Vleminckx. Kingda Ka maintained the title as the world's fastest coaster until Formula Rossa at Ferrari World opened in November 2010.

Kingda Ka became popular among the general public and roller coaster enthusiasts. However, its use of relatively new technology meant that Six Flags Great Adventure had to hire a dedicated maintenance team for the ride. A mechanical failure resulted in the closing of the ride for nearly two months during its inaugural season, and it was closed for an additional three weeks at the beginning of the 2006 season.

On clear days, riders could see the skylines of New York City and Philadelphia.

=== Addition of Zumanjaro ===
On August 29, 2013, Six Flags Great Adventure officially announced Zumanjaro: Drop of Doom for the 2014 season. The drop tower featured three gondolas integrated into the existing structure of Kingda Ka which was also built by Intamin. Kingda Ka closed at the start of the 2014 season in order to begin construction, reopened on weekends starting on Memorial Day, and fully reopened when Zumanjaro was completed on July 4, 2014.

=== Permanent closure and demolition ===
Rumors began circulating in the summer of 2024 that Kingda Ka would be closed permanently, and that it could occur as early as the end of the 2024 season. Six Flags did not confirm or deny the rumors, and many enthusiasts from around the region visited the park to ride in anticipation they could be true. On November 14, 2024, a few days after the ride closed for the season, Six Flags Great Adventure confirmed that Kingda Ka had closed permanently and would be removed. In addition, the park also announced the removal of Zumanjaro, Green Lantern, the parachute drop ride, and Twister. Officials stated the rides were being removed to make way for future development, including a new "multi-world-record-breaking launch roller coaster" that was scheduled to debut in 2026.

The following month on December 18, 2024, the park applied for a work permit to demolish Kingda Ka and Zumanjaro. A project bid notice for "demolition and controlled implosion" of the ride was sent out soon after. Kingda Ka's demolition was initiated on January 20, 2025, beginning with the removal of its track. The top hat tower remained standing until its implosion on February 28, 2025, by Controlled Demolition, Inc. That July, the front car of one of Kingda Ka's trains was donated to the National Roller Coaster Museum and Archives, following a fundraising campaign. On July 28, 2025, the ride's replacement was delayed beyond 2026.

== Ride experience ==
=== Queue ===
Kingda Ka originally featured a detailed and elaborate queue line that ran between the launch and brakes of the coaster. Guests would enter the ride, then walk down a narrow pathway where they would eventually cross under the launch track. A themed tunnel was built where guests crossed under the launch to ensure safety. Guests would then enter a series of three switchbacks, with the third being underneath a permanent structure. This structure featured poles with detailed carvings of animals to help immerse guests into the Golden Kingdom. Following this final series of switchbacks, guests would approach the station, where the line would divide in two to equally fill both sides of the ride station. This queue was designed to handle the large crowds the park anticipated to accompany the ride. After an incident in the ride's opening year that occurred right where guests crossed under the launch, the decision was made to not use this queue to ensure guest safety. From that point forward, the overflow queue would be used as the permanent queue, and parts of the original queue were still visible from Kingda Ka's station.

Guests passed under the jungle-themed entrance sign and entered the queue line, which was surrounded by bamboo, which augments the jungle-themed music that played in the background. Throughout the queue, there were safety and warning signs about the ride. Following a long straight section, guests turned left and headed into a switchback section, which was followed by several curved paths before entering the station.

=== Layout ===
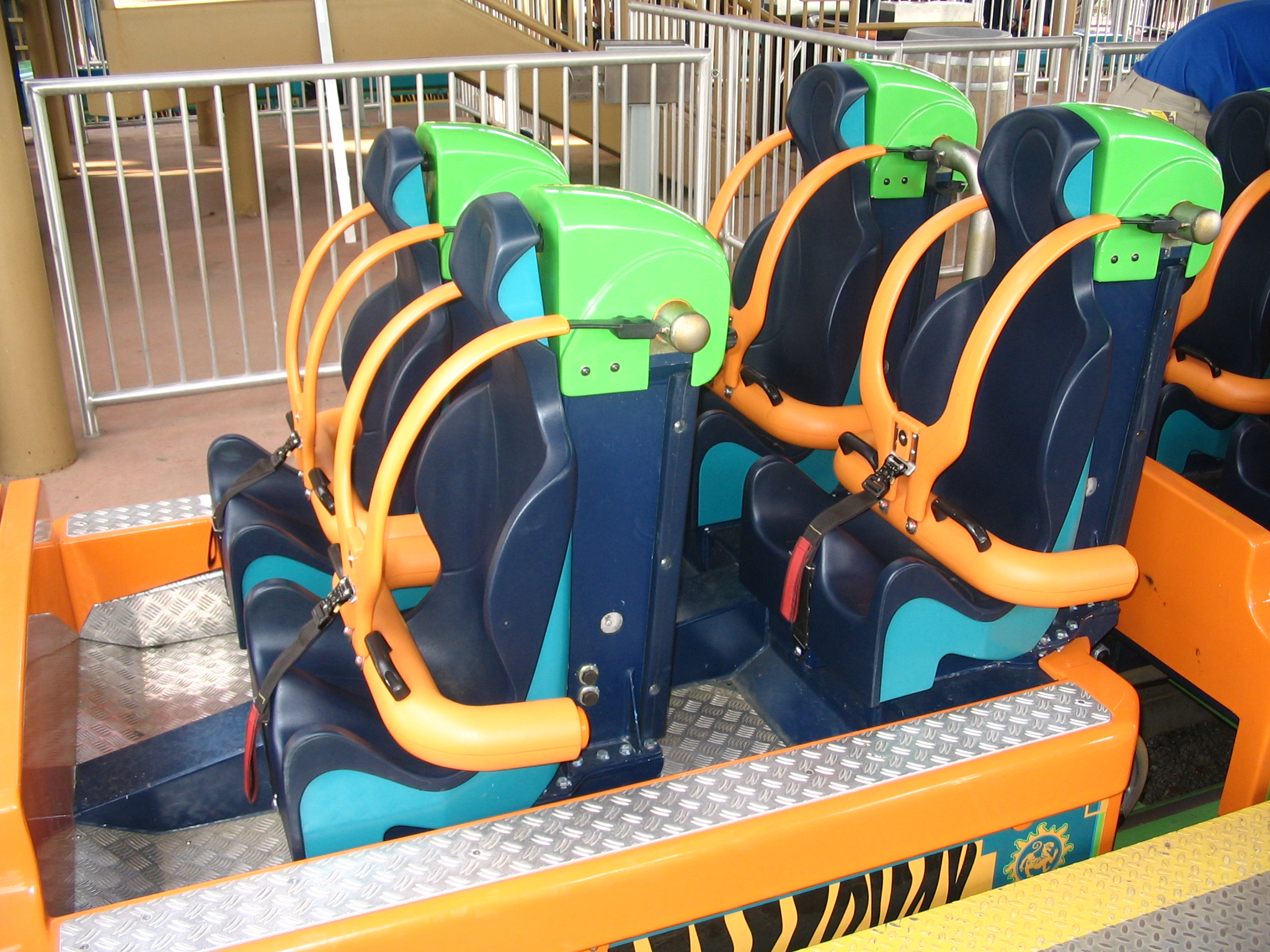
Kingda Ka's seat restraints

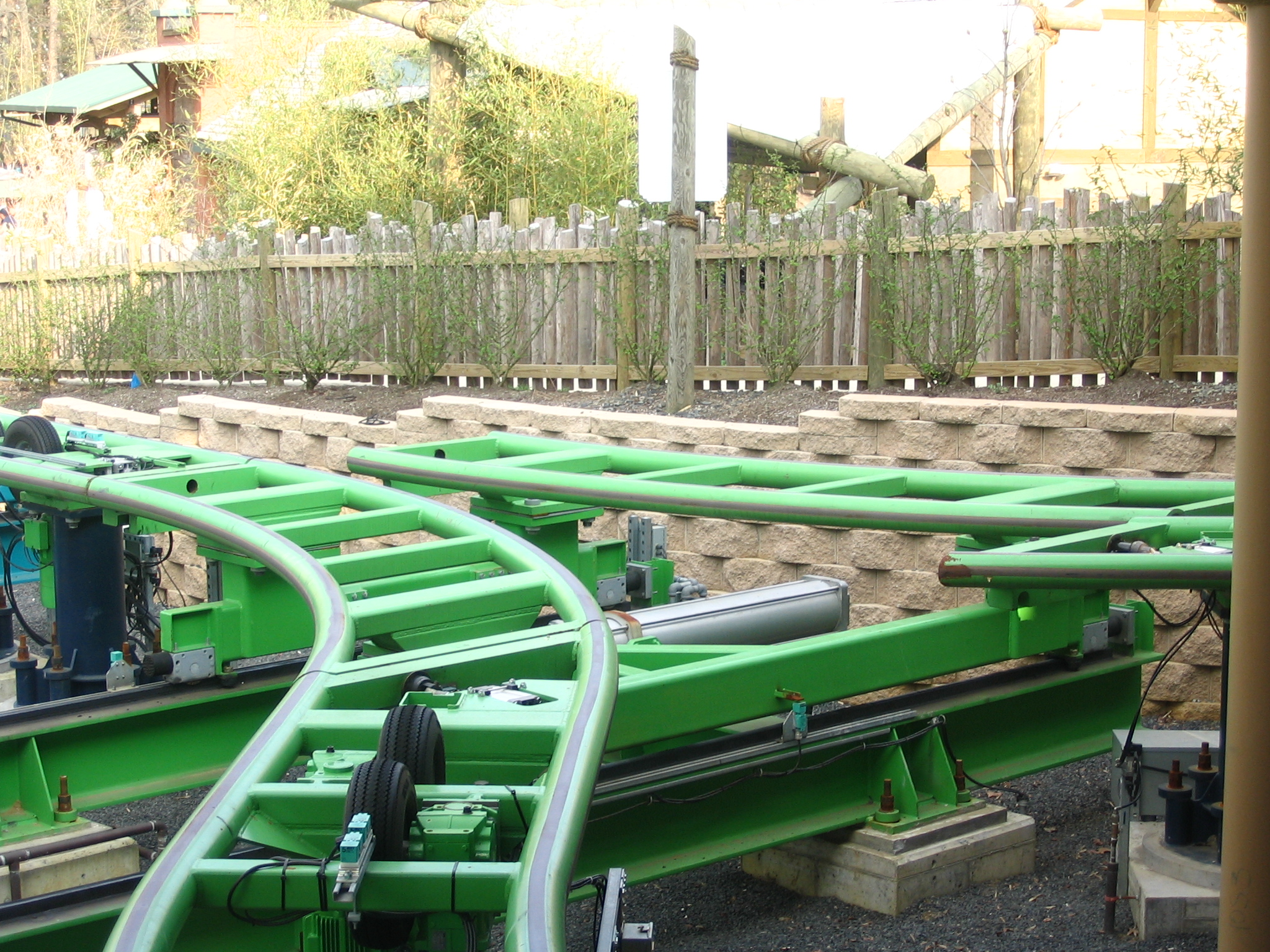
Switch track at the station's exit

After the train had been locked and checked, it moved slowly out of the station to the launch area, then passed through a switch track which allowed four trains on two tracks to load simultaneously. When the signal was given to launch, the train rolled back slightly so that the catch car could latch on to the middle car, and the brakes retracted on the launch track. As the brake fins were retracting, a recording announced: "Arms down, head back, hold on!" The train was launched approximately five seconds later.

When the train was in position, the hydraulic launch mechanism accelerated it from 0 to 128 mph (0 to 206 km/h) in 3.5 seconds. The hydraulic launch motor was capable of producing 20,800 peak horsepower (15.5 MW). At the end of the launch track, the train climbed the main tower (top hat) and rolled 90 degrees to the right before reaching a height of 456 feet (139 m). It then descended 418 feet (127 m) straight down through a 270-degree, clockwise spiral. It climbed the second hill of 129 feet (39 m), producing a moment of weightlessness before being smoothly brought to a stop by the magnetic brakes; it then made a left-hand U-turn and entered the station. The ride lasted 28 seconds from the start of the launch. The track measured about 3,118 feet (950 m) long.

=== Trains and station ===
Kingda Ka's four trains were color-coded for easy identification (green, dark blue, teal, and orange) and were numbered; the four colors were also used for the seats and restraints. Each train seated 18 people (two per row). The rear car had one row, while the rest had two. The rear row of each car was positioned higher than its front row for better visibility. Kingda Ka's over-the-shoulder restraint system consisted of a thick, rigid lap bar and two flexible over-the-shoulder restraints.

Kingda Ka's station had two parallel tracks with switch tracks at the entrance and exit. Each of the station's tracks was designed to accommodate two trains, so each of the four trains could be operated from its own station. Because all of Kingda Ka's trains were mechanically identical and able to load and unload at each of the four individual station bays, the original plan was for all trains to operate at the same time, and for each train to load and unload at its own station. Trains on one side would be loaded, while trains on the other side would be launched. An employee also directed riders in line to a particular side, where they could then choose to sit anywhere within the train.

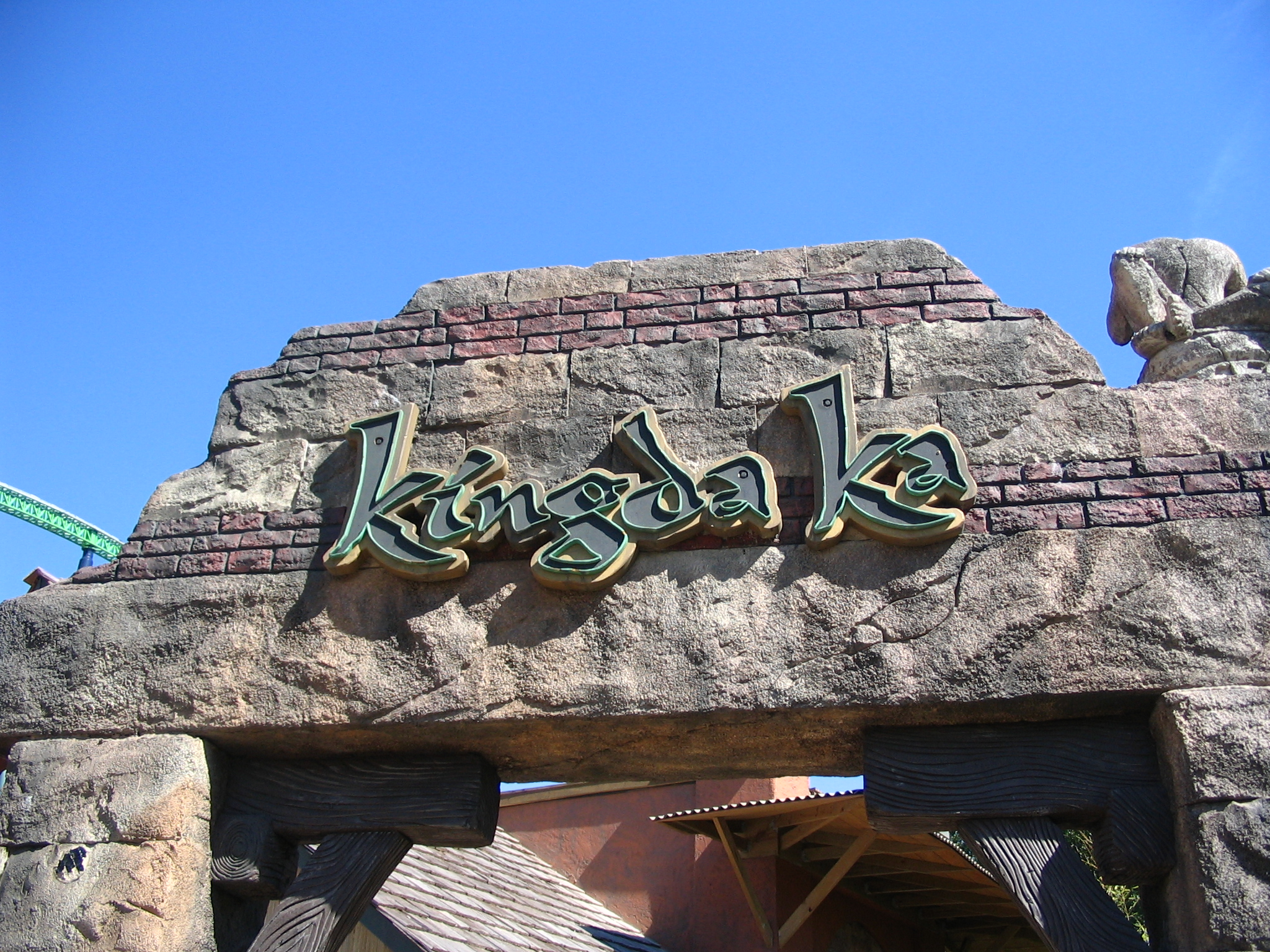
Jungle-themed entrance sign

=== Theme ===
Kingda Ka was located in the jungle-themed area of the park known as The Golden Kingdom. The namesake for the ride was a Bengal tiger who resided in the nearby Temple of the Tiger attraction, an interactive exhibit that was closed in 2010.

=== Rollbacks ===
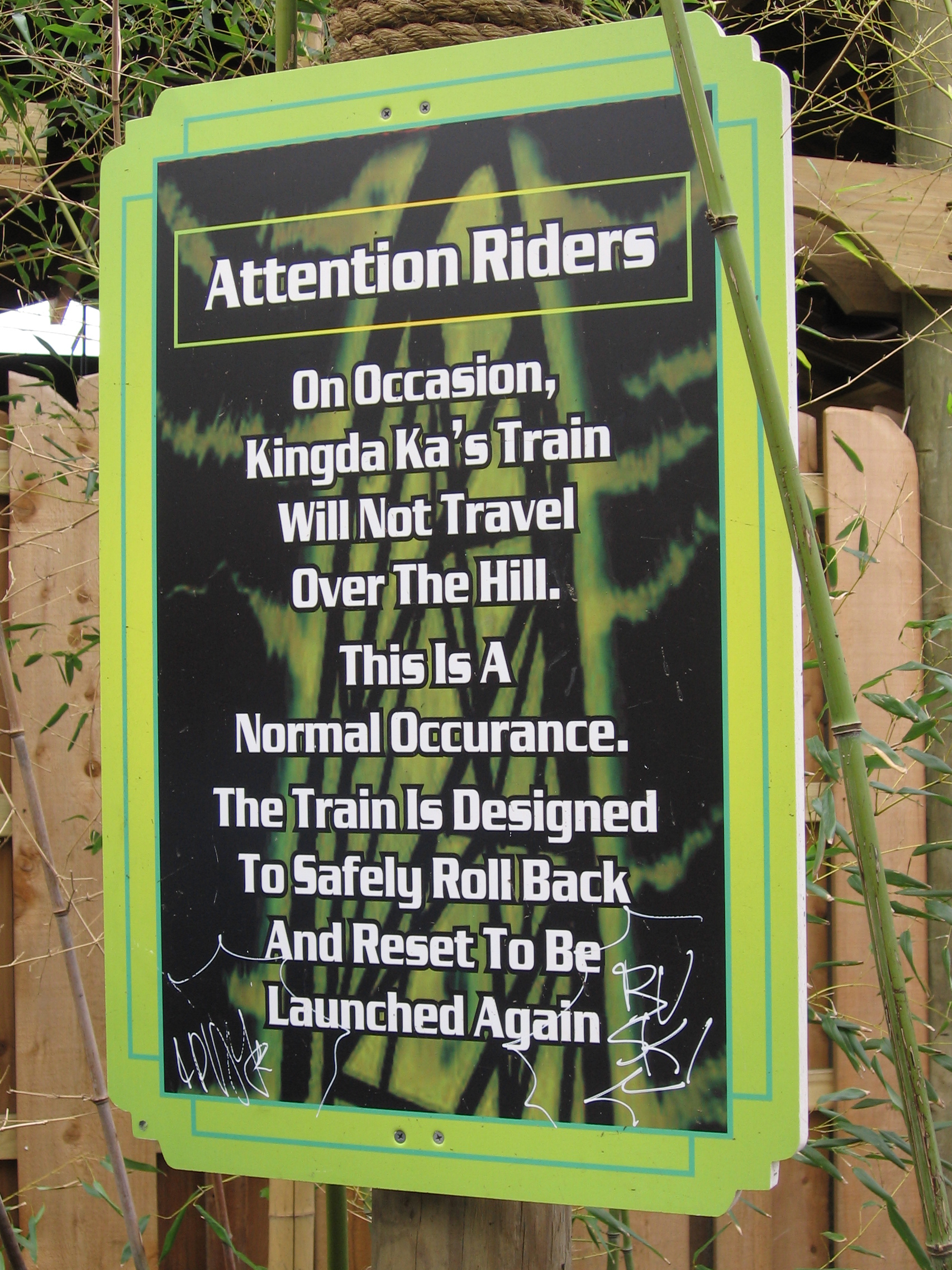
Rollback warning sign

A train may have occasionally experienced a rollback following a launch. A rollback occurs when the train fails to make it over the top of the tower and descends back down the side it was launched. Kingda Ka included retractable magnetic brakes on its launch track to prevent a train from rolling back all the way into the loading station (and potentially colliding with the next about-to-be-launched train).

== Incidents ==
On June 8, 2005, a bolt failed inside a trough through which the launch cable travels. This caused the liner to come loose, creating friction on the cable and preventing the train from accelerating to the correct speed. The cable rubbing against the trough caused sparks and shards of metal to fly out from the bottom of the train. Damage occurred to the launch cable, which was frayed and required replacement, including minor damage to seals and brake fins. Kingda Ka reopened on August 4, 2005.

In May 2009, Kingda Ka was struck by lightning and seriously damaged. The ride was closed for three months for repairs and reopened on August 21, 2009. Shortly before Hurricane Irene on August 27, 2011, Kingda Ka suffered unspecified damage and Six Flags Great Adventure did not open. The coaster did not operate prior to Irene, and it remained closed for the remainder of the season.

A 12-year-old boy was struck in the face by a bird while riding Kingda Ka on July 26, 2012. In 2019, a guest sued Six Flags and Intamin in U.S. federal court, claiming that tall riders could be subjected to "extreme speed and torquing forces" and that the harnesses could also cause injuries. The plaintiff, who was 6 feet 2 inches (1.88 m) in height and three inches below the ride's posted height limit of 6 feet 5 inches (1.96 m), claimed to have suffered multiple back injuries after riding Kingda Ka in 2017. Both Six Flags and Intamin filed a motion to dismiss the lawsuit, which was partially granted and partially denied in 2020.

== Awards ==
Golden Ticket Awards: Top steel Roller Coasters
Year									1998	1999
Ranking									–	–
Year	2000	2001	2002	2003	2004	2005	2006	2007	2008	2009
Ranking	–	–	–	–	–	42	28	31	25	31
Year	2010	2011	2012	2013	2014	2015	2016	2017	2018	2019
Ranking	27 (tie)	33	38	35 (tie)	45	49	–	–	–	–
Year	2020	2021	2022	2023	2024	2025	2026			
Ranking	N/A	–	–	–	–	–	–			

== Records ==
Preceded by Top Thrill Dragster	World's Tallest Full-Circuit Roller Coaster; May 21, 2005 – November 10, 2024	Succeeded by Red Force (Note: At the time of Kingda Ka's closure, Top Thrill 2 was standing but not operating, while significant repairs were made to it. If it were operating at the time, it would have taken this record.)
Preceded by Top Thrill Dragster	World's Tallest Roller Coaster; May 21, 2005 – November 10, 2024	Succeeded by Red Force
Preceded by Top Thrill Dragster	World's Fastest Roller Coaster; May 21, 2005 – November 4, 2010	Succeeded by Formula Rossa
Preceded by Top Thrill Dragster	World's Tallest Roller Coaster Drop; May 21, 2005 – November 10, 2024	Succeeded by Red Force
