= Top Thrill 2 =

Launched roller coaster at Cedar Point

- Previously known as Top Thrill Dragster (2003–2021)

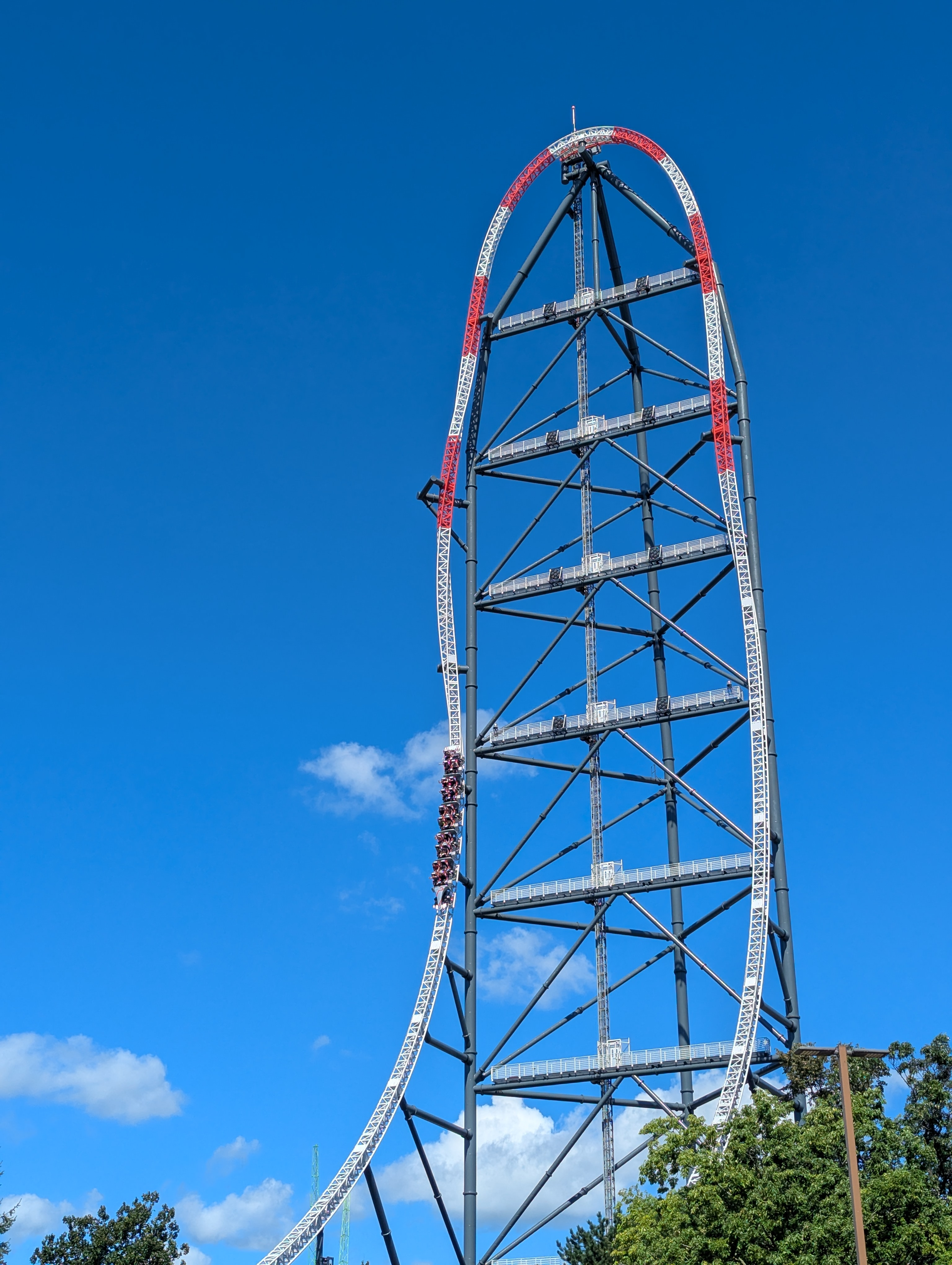
- A train on Top Thrill 2 descending the top hat

Cedar Point
- Location: Cedar Point
- Park section: Top Thrill 2 Midway
- Coordinates: 41°29′2.25″N 82°41′10.38″W
- Status: Operating
- Soft opening date: April 25, 2024
- Opening date: May 4, 2024
- Cost: $25 million (Note: Associated with the original construction of Top Thrill Dragster in 2003)

General statistics
- Type: Steel – Launched
- Designer: Werner Stengel
- Model: LSM Lightning Launch Coaster
- Lift/launch system: LSM multi-launch
- Height: 420 ft (130 m)
- Drop: 400 ft (120 m)
- Length: 3,422 ft (1,043 m)
- Speed: 120 mph (190 km/h)
- Inversions: 0
- Duration: 2:00
- Max vertical angle: 90°
- Height restriction: 52 in (132 cm)
- Trains: 6 trains with 5 cars; riders arranged 2 across in 2 rows for a total of 20 riders per train
- Original manufacturer: Intamin
- Redesigned by: Zamperla
- Music: "Ready to Go" by Republica
- Fast Lane Plus only available
- Top Thrill 2 at RCDB

Video

Top Thrill 2 is a launched roller coaster located at Cedar Point in Sandusky, Ohio, United States. The ride originally opened as Top Thrill Dragster in 2003, becoming the tallest and fastest roller coaster in the world, as well as the first ever strata coaster. The original was an Accelerator Coaster model from Intamin designed by Werner Stengel, featuring a height of 420 feet (130 m) and a drop distance of 400 feet (120 m). It could accelerate from 0 to 120 mph (190 km/h) in 3.8 seconds and was themed to Top Fuel drag racing, with a launch track designed to resemble a dragstrip. Although its height and speed records were surpassed by Kingda Ka at Six Flags Great Adventure in 2005, the ride consistently ranked as one of the world's top steel coasters.

Following a serious incident in 2021, in which a guest was severely injured while standing in line, Top Thrill Dragster was abruptly shut down and remained closed with an uncertain future. Nearly two years later, Zamperla was hired to create a new version of the ride, adding a second 420-foot (130 m) tower and replacing Intamin's hydraulic launch system with a new linear synchronous motor (LSM) launch system. Though less powerful, the LSM launch propels the train three times in a new launch sequence – forward, backward, and forward again – to reach the same maximum speed as the original design.

The coaster reemerged as Top Thrill 2 on May 4, 2024, featuring a new, longer riding experience. However, its inaugural season was cut short after only a week of operation, when an issue with its trains required modifications. The ride eventually reopened the following season in 2025, and after Kingda Ka closed, it briefly recaptured the title as the tallest roller coaster in the world. Falcons Flight claimed the title when it opened later that year.

== History ==
According to Rob Decker, Vice President of Planning and Design, the park began working on a new project shortly after the debut of Millennium Force in 2000. The goal, as he stated to Intamin, "was to set another world record, and our parameters were the tallest, fastest roller coaster". After considering modern propulsion methods used on coasters at the time, Intamin ultimately decided to design a new hydraulic launch system that would provide the most cost effective solution in a small footprint.

=== Construction ===
After the 2001 season ended, one of the park's Dodgem rides, which was located across from Magnum XL-200's entrance, was relocated to Michigan's Adventure to clear the way for the new ride. In April 2002, work began on the concrete foundation. The concrete footings were kept hidden behind a fence when the park opened for the 2002 season. In August, an informal announcement from Cedar Point confirmed the park was building a new ride for the 2003 season. Track pieces identified as Intamin were previously spotted near Mean Streak. Vertical construction by Martin & Vleminckx began in the fall season, months before the formal announcement. By October, the roller coaster had reached 200 feet (61 m) in height, and the highest peak was topped off in December. The construction of the record-breaking top hat element, which stands 420 feet tall (130 m), required the use of two cranes that could extend up to 480 feet (150 m) in height. At the time, only four such cranes existed in the US.

An official announcement revealing details on the new ride was made the following month on January 9, 2003. Officials for the park stated the goal was to build "the tallest and fastest roller coaster on earth", reaching 420 feet (130 m) in height and accelerating up to 120 mph (190 km/h) in 4 seconds. Its height also classified it as the world's first strata coaster, which is any full-circuit roller coaster with a height or drop between 400 to 499 feet (122 to 152 m). The large investment tied it with Millennium Force as being the most expensive in park history. The structure was built by Intamin's subcontractor Stakotra. In March, Cedar Fair registered a trademark for the name "Top Thrill Dragster".

=== Operation as Top Thrill Dragster (2003–2021) ===
Top Thrill Dragster's media day was held on May 1, 2003, and it officially opened to the public three days later. It became the tallest and fastest roller coaster in the world, surpassing Superman: The Escape at Six Flags Magic Mountain in height, which had opened in 1997, and surpassing Dodonpa at Fuji-Q Highland in speed, which had opened in 2001. It lost both records to Kingda Ka at Six Flags Great Adventure in May 2005. Intamin designed both Kingda Ka and Top Thrill Dragster, and the two shared a similar design and layout that differed primarily by theme and an additional hill featured on Kingda Ka. Shortly after it opened, a faulty valve on the hydraulic system caused a short-term closure. The ride continued to experience a variety of issues dealing with its hydraulic system and launch cable, which frequently led to downtime early on in its tenure.

During the 2017 season's opening weekend, Cedar Point temporarily renamed the ride "Top Thrill Cubster", referencing a lost wager with Six Flags Great America over the World Series. In 2020, during the COVID-19 pandemic, timed boarding passes called "Access Passes" were used temporarily to comply with social distancing guidelines.

==== Closure ====
On August 15, 2021, a guest waiting in line to ride Top Thrill Dragster was struck in the head by a small metal piece that dislodged from a train, resulting in a severe injury that was described as a "serious accident". The ride remained closed the following two seasons pending an investigation by the Ohio Department of Agriculture (ODA) and a redesign of the roller coaster, described as a "new and reimagined ride experience".

At the time of its closure, Top Thrill Dragster had accommodated 18 million riders over 19 seasons. An update was released on social media in September 2022 stating, "Top Thrill Dragster, as you know it, is being retired." Officials provided limited details but confirmed that the roller coaster would reopen as a "new and reimagined ride experience". A portion of the roller coaster's track near the station was dismantled in late 2022. In January 2023, the park released the tagline "A New Formula For Thrills" on social media to describe the planned modifications.

=== Reemergence as Top Thrill 2 ===
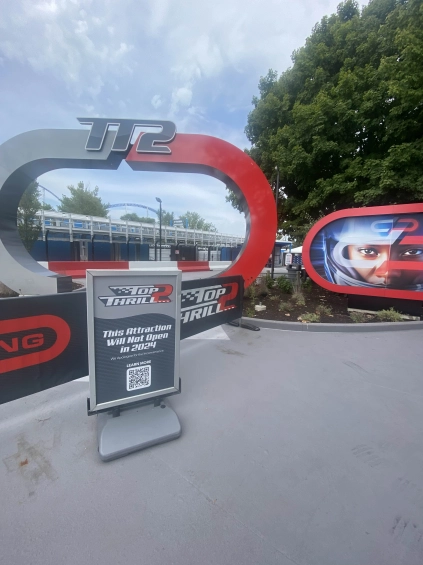
The closed entrance to Top Thrill 2

There was speculation that Top Thrill Dragster's hydraulic launch system would be replaced. In August 2023, the speculation was confirmed after Cedar Point announced plans to transform Top Thrill Dragster into a triple-launched roller coaster using a linear synchronous motor (LSM) launch system, hiring Zamperla to redesign the ride. Although Zamperla was not a well-known name among major coaster manufacturers, they had experience working on large projects previously, had been growing their coaster division for most of a decade, and their 2019 "Lightning Train" model was well-equipped for the task. Adam Sandy, Zamperla's Director of Roller Coaster Sales and Marketing, noted that the switch to LSM would increase reliability and allow for lighter trains, which in turn would be manufactured with larger wheels to reduce cool down time and overall maintenance. Tony Clark, director of communications at Cedar Point, stated that the goal of the transformation was to "enhance the experience, make it more reliable".

The modified coaster was set to reopen as Top Thrill 2. Zamperla reused the existing 420-foot (130 m) top hat element and added an equally-sized vertical spike at the opposite end of the track. While the maximum height and speed remained the same, the track length increased from 2,800 to 3,422 feet (853 to 1,043 m). The vertical spike was topped out during construction in early December 2023, and testing began in early 2024.

Cedar Point held a soft opening media day event on April 25, 2024. The ride officially opened on May 4, 2024. A short time later on May 12, Cedar Point closed Top Thrill 2 unexpectedly, describing it as an "extended closure" while Zamperla worked to make mechanical modifications to the coaster trains.

The ride remained closed indefinitely through months of speculation and sporadic testing. On August 23, 2024, the park announced that Top Thrill 2 would not reopen for the remainder of the season, but that work would continue with the goal of reopening the ride in 2025. The issue with the trains was fixed in the offseason, and Top Thrill 2 reopened with the park for the 2025 season. It also reopened as the tallest roller coaster in the world following the closure of Kingda Ka in late 2024, but its record was eventually surpassed by Falcons Flight as it opened in late December 2025.

== Ride experience ==
=== Layout ===
==== As Top Thrill Dragster (2003–2021) ====
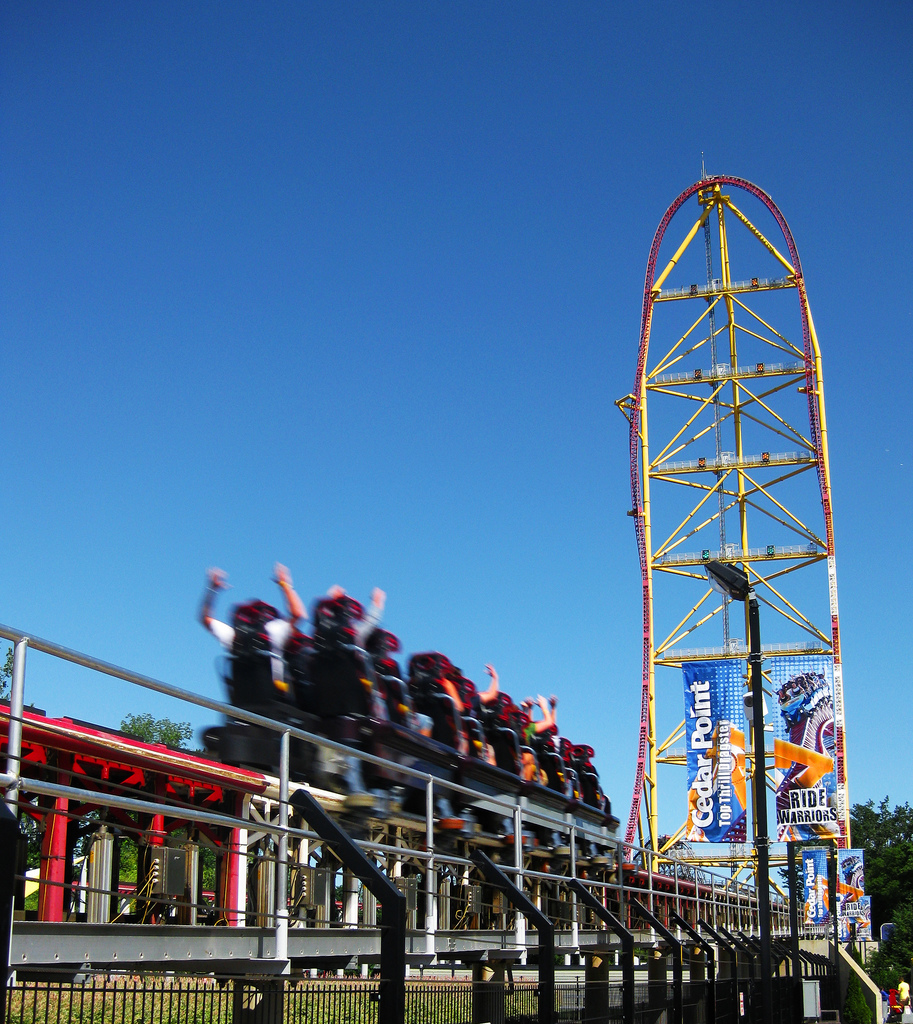
Top Thrill Dragster in 2009

After leaving the station, the train entered the launch area. To the left of the launch area was a "Christmas tree" light, similar to those employed at the starting line of a drag strip. A message was played to the riders before the launch: "Keep arms down, head back, and hold on." Once the train was prepared to launch, a motor revving sound effect was played and its magnetic braking fins were lowered from the launch track. It then launched, accelerating to a speed of 120 mph (190 km/h) in 3.8 seconds. Shortly after reaching its maximum velocity, the catch car disengaged, and the train began its ascent up a 90-degree incline, twisting 90 degrees clockwise before climbing over the 420-foot (130 m) top hat. Upon descending, the track twisted 270 degrees before leveling out, allowing the train to be stopped by the magnetic brakes.

==== As Top Thrill 2 (2024–present) ====
After leaving the station, the train passes through a switch track and makes an S-turn to the right to join the launch track. To the left of the launch area is a modified version of the original "Christmas tree" light. As soon as the switch track changes positions behind the train, the train is launched forward towards the original top hat at 74 mph (119 km/h), rolling backward partway up the tower. Reaching the launch track again, the train is launched in reverse at 101 mph (163 km/h), past the station, and up a 420-foot (130 m) vertical spike in reverse, crossing over Iron Dragon in the process. Rolling forward onto the launch track once again, the station roof creates a headchopper effect and the train is accelerated to 120 mph (190 km/h) to crest the top hat. After descending the 270 degree spiral drop, the train hits the brake run, while the switch track is reset to allow another train to launch.

=== Station, theme, and trains ===
==== As Top Thrill Dragster (2003–2021) ====
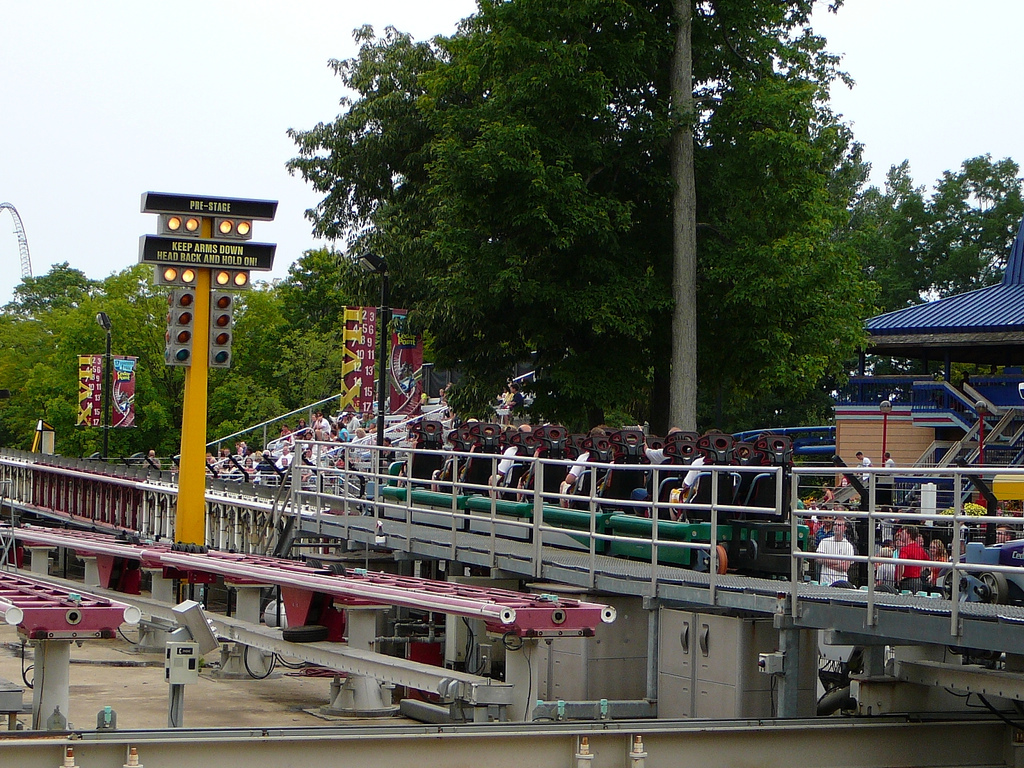
Top Thrill Dragster's launch area with the "Christmas tree"

The roller coaster was themed to Top Fuel drag racing, a category of motor racing that involves the world's fastest accelerating cars. An actual Top Fuel dragster weighs approximately one ton, while each train on the coaster weighed 15 tons. Originally, the design called for five cars on each train, but when the ride first opened, there were only four. A fifth car was added to each by midseason.

Each dragster-themed train was also decorated with a spoiler, a set of tires, and an engine at the rear of each train, but these were removed after the fifth car was added to allow an extra row of seats to take their place.

The track was mostly painted red, with the launch and approach to the tower having white stripes alternating with red sections. The supports were white on the launch and brake area and yellow on the tower.

==== As Top Thrill 2 (2024–present) ====
As Top Thrill 2, the top fuel theming was dropped in favor of a more general racing theme, similar to that of Formula One. The ride area, as well as the trains, are decorated with a stylized logo of "CP Racing". The redesigned ride runs three 5-car trains supplied by Zamperla, holding 20 people per train. The trains are of Zamperla's Lightning model, which is notable for using a milled aluminum chassis and carbon fiber bodywork. For safety, riders can not bring loose items onto the ride, and metal detectors are used to enforce this at the beginning of the queue.

As part of the refurbishment, the ride was repainted to have white track and dark grey supports, with the highest points on both the spike and top hat towers being accented with red and white alternating sections.

=== Rollbacks ===
Occasionally, a train will launch without sufficient speed to reach the top of the tower and roll back onto the launch track, hence the term "rollback". This typically happens in cool, wet, or breezy weather, or when the wind is significantly working against the ride's launch. As Top Thrill Dragster, the launch track was equipped with retractable magnetic brake fins, which were raised after each launch to slow the train down in case it did not reach the top of the tower. As Top Thrill 2, if the train does not crest over the top after the third launch, the LSM fins also function as braking fins to slow the train down.

On very rare occasions, a combination of the weight distribution of the train, the force of the launch, and the wind can stall a train on top of the tower. When this happens, a mechanic will take the elevator to the top and push the train down the hill.

== Records and rankings ==
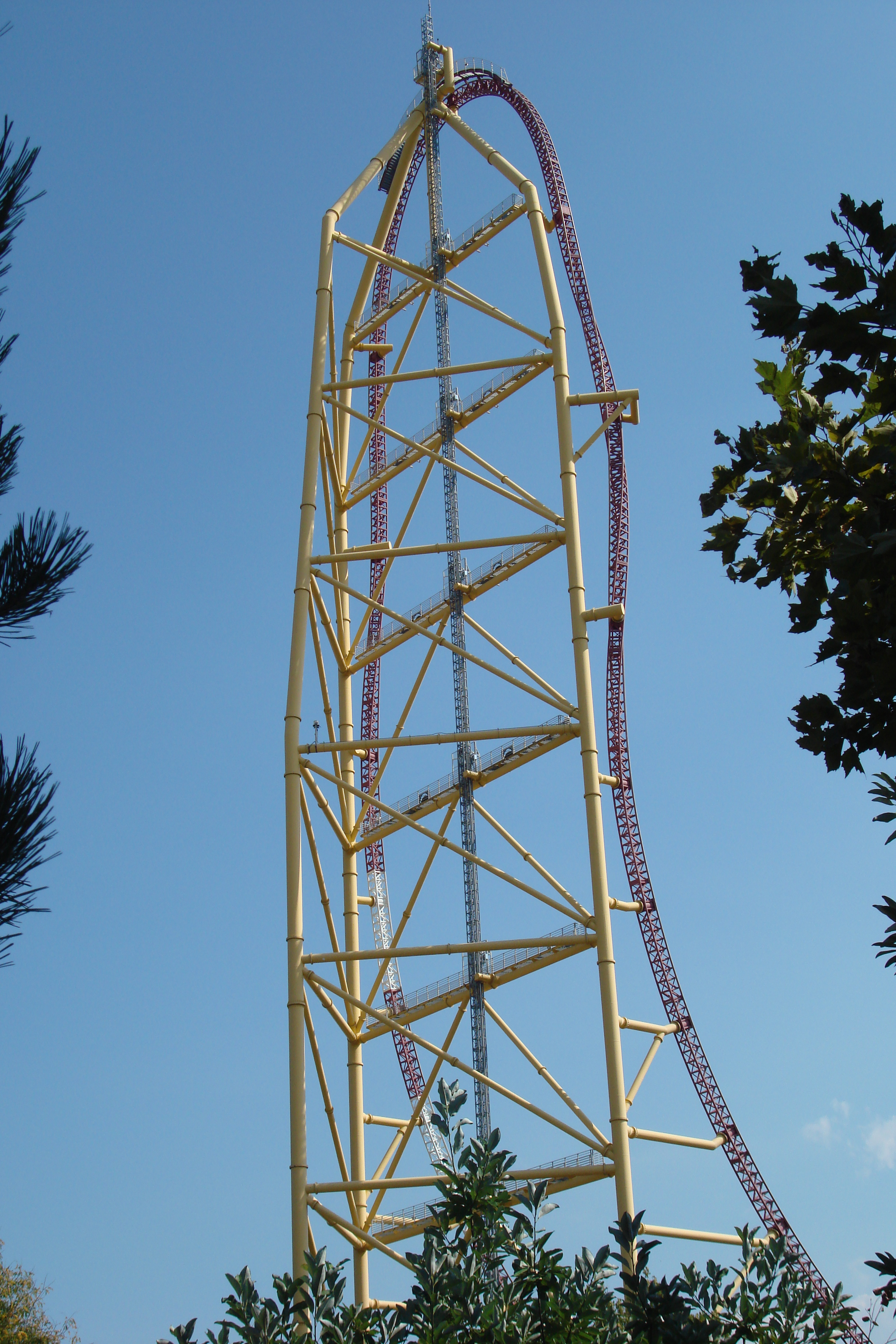
Side view of Top Thrill Dragster

When Top Thrill Dragster debuted in 2003, it set three world records:

- World's tallest roller coaster
- World's longest roller coaster drop
- World's fastest roller coaster

Top Thrill Dragster opened as the tallest roller coaster ever built with the longest drop, standing 420 feet tall (130 m) and featuring a drop length of 400 feet (120 m). The previous record holder at the time was Superman: The Escape (later renamed Superman: Escape from Krypton), which stood 415 feet (126 m), located at Six Flags Magic Mountain in Valencia, California. Top Thrill Dragster also became the fastest roller coaster in the world with a maximum speed of 120 mph (190 km/h), surpassing Dodonpa at Fuji-Q Highland, which reached a top speed of 107 mph (172 km/h).

The records were short-lived, however, because in May 2005, Kingda Ka opened at Six Flags Great Adventure. It became the new record holder in all three categories, with a height of 456 feet (139 m), a drop height of 415 feet (126 m), and a top speed of 128 mph (206 km/h).

In the last operational year of the Top Thrill Dragster in 2021, the roller coaster had the second tallest height, the third fastest speed, and the second-highest drop among steel roller coasters in the world. Top Thrill Dragster was the second hydraulically launched roller coaster from Intamin following Xcelerator at Knott's Berry Farm, and along with Kingda Ka, it is one of two strata coasters ever built. Its marketing tagline was "Race for the Sky".

As Top Thrill 2, the ride has been marketed as the "tallest and fastest triple launch strata coaster" by Cedar Point, with Zamperla using the more general "tallest and fastest triple launch coaster" in its marketing material.

=== Golden Ticket Awards: Top Thrill Dragster ===
Golden Ticket Awards: Top steel Roller Coasters
Year									1998	1999
Ranking									–	–
Year	2000	2001	2002	2003	2004	2005	2006	2007	2008	2009
Ranking	–	–	–	11	7	7	10	9	9	10
Year	2010	2011	2012	2013	2014	2015	2016	2017	2018	2019
Ranking	10	9	13	12	19	13	19	17	16	21
Year	2020	2021	2022	2023	2024	2025	2026			
Ranking	N/A	28 (tie)	–	–	–	–	–			

=== Golden Ticket Awards: Top Thrill 2 ===
Golden Ticket Awards: Top steel Roller Coasters
Year									1998	1999
Ranking									–	–
Year	2000	2001	2002	2003	2004	2005	2006	2007	2008	2009
Ranking	–	–	–	–	–	–	–	–	–	–
Year	2010	2011	2012	2013	2014	2015	2016	2017	2018	2019
Ranking	–	–	–	–	–	–	–	–	–	–
Year	2020	2021	2022	2023	2024	2025	2026			
Ranking	N/A	–	–	–	–	–	23			

=== Records held ===
Preceded by Steel Dragon 2000	World's Tallest Complete Circuit Roller Coaster; May 4, 2003 – May 21, 2005; November 11, 2024 – December 31, 2025	Succeeded by Kingda Ka
Preceded by Kingda Ka	World's Tallest Complete Circuit Roller Coaster; May 4, 2003 – May 21, 2005; November 11, 2024 – December 31, 2025	Succeeded by Falcons Flight
Preceded by Superman: The Escape	World's Tallest Roller Coaster; May 4, 2003 – May 21, 2005; November 11, 2024 – December 31, 2025	Succeeded by Kingda Ka
Preceded by Kingda Ka	World's Tallest Roller Coaster; May 4, 2003 – May 21, 2005; November 11, 2024 – December 31, 2025	Succeeded by Falcons Flight
Preceded by Dodonpa	World's Fastest Roller Coaster; May 4, 2003 – May 21, 2005	Succeeded by Kingda Ka

== Incidents ==
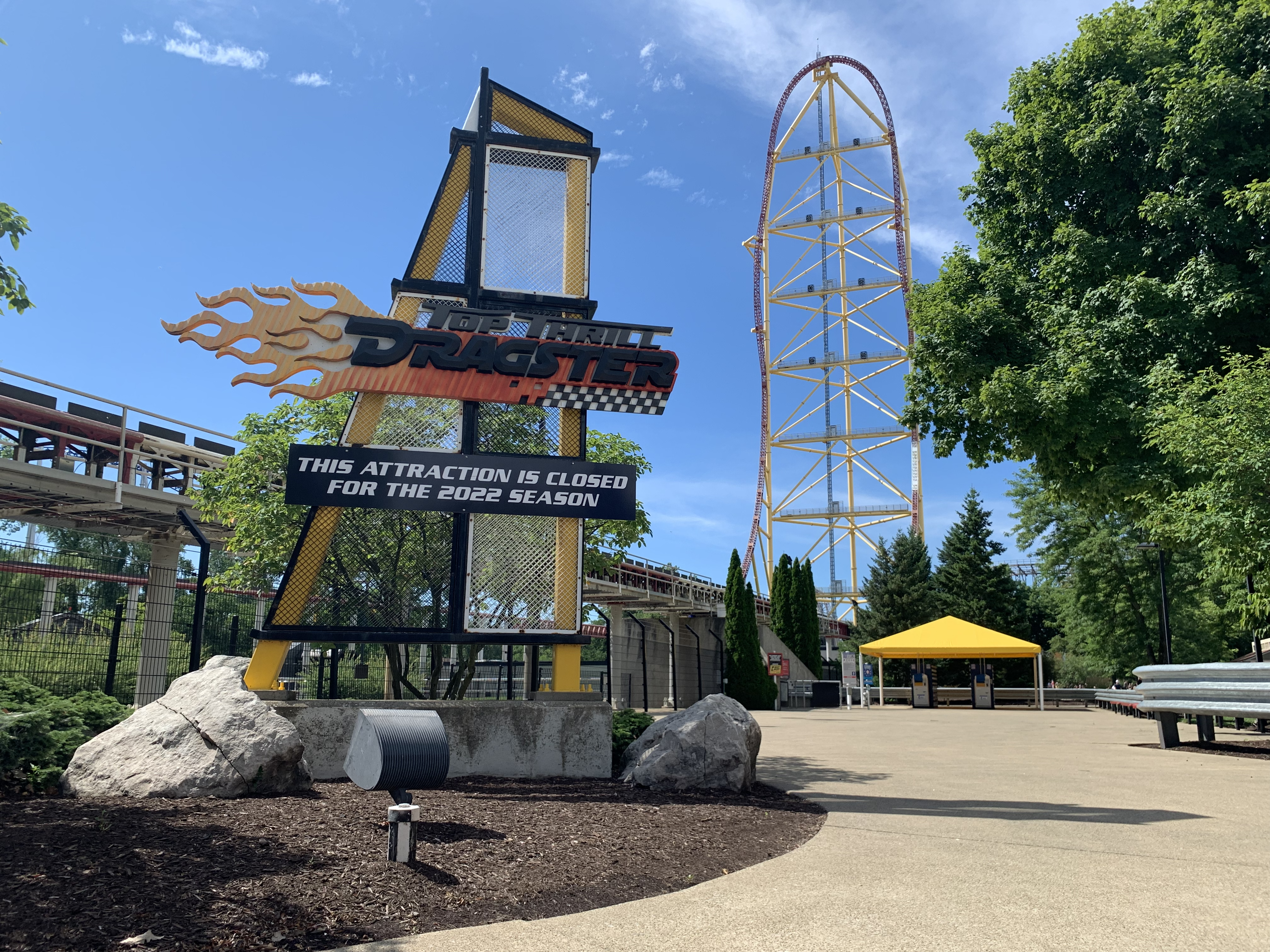
Top Thrill Dragster sitting dormant in 2022

While in operation as Top Thrill Dragster, there were several reported incidents, including a major occurrence that led to a significant transformation of the ride. On July 14, 2004, four people were struck by small metal pieces and other debris, resulting in minor injuries. The flying debris deflected off the ride's launch cable according to a park official. Another issue involving the launch cable occurred on August 7, 2016, where it became detached, leading to the shutdown of the ride. Two guests were evaluated at Cedar Point's first aid center and later returned to the park, while Top Thrill Dragster underwent a thorough inspection and reopened two days later.

On August 15, 2021, in what was described as a "serious accident", a guest waiting in line was struck in the head by a small metal L-shaped bracket, called a flag plate, that dislodged from a train as it was nearing the end of its cycle. The guest was severely injured and treated at a nearby hospital. Top Thrill Dragster was closed for the remainder of the season.

An investigation by the Ohio Department of Agriculture (ODA) was completed in February 2022 and found that half of the bolts securing the flag plate had dislodged. The report confirmed that the ride underwent regular maintenance, including an inspection the night before the accident, which determined the metal plate to be in "normal, working condition". ODA did not find evidence that Cedar Point violated state laws or that the park had any reason to believe the ride was in "unsafe condition". In order to reopen the ride, Cedar Point would be required to perform a list of repairs including the replacement of "different or improper grade" bolts and damaged track sections. Instead of repairing the ride, Cedar Point opted to hire Zamperla to create a new version of the ride, which became Top Thrill 2 in 2024.

The injured guest was later reported to have suffered a traumatic brain injury, and the family sued Cedar Point in 2023. A settlement with confidential terms was reached on April 13, 2024.
