= Space Probe (Wonderland Sydney) =

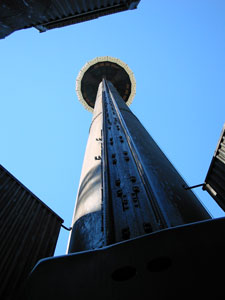

Wonderland Sydney
- Area: Transylvania
- Coordinates: 33.80119°S 150.84754°E
- Status: Removed
- Cost: AUD$10,000,000
- Opening date: November 1995
- Closing date: 26 April 2004

Ride statistics
- Attraction type: Giant Drop
- Manufacturer: Intamin
- Height: 67 m (220 ft)
- Drop: 61 m (200 ft)
- Speed: 120 km/h (75 mph)
- G-force: 4
- Capacity: 600 riders per hour
- Vehicles: 3
- Riders per vehicle: 4
- Duration: 40 seconds max
- Height restriction: 52 in (132 cm)

Space Probe was a Giant Drop ride located at Wonderland Sydney in Australia. It was manufactured by Intamin and opened as the world's tallest and fastest free-fall ride. The ride opened in November 1995 and closed on 26 April 2004.

== Ride experience ==
The ride consists of 3 vehicles around a central tube which is 67 metres (220 ft) tall. Once passengers arrive at the front of the queue, they pass through a turnstile and enter a debriefing room via a sliding-door airlock. Once they are debriefed they leave through a second door and enter the launch bay area, guests then take their seat in their given vehicle. Riders are four abreast and are brought to a height of 61 metres (200 ft) by a coupler.

Traveling at a speed of 20 kilometres per hour (12 mph), riders reach the top of the tower in 25 seconds. The vehicles slowly enter a large umbrella as they climb the last few feet. Within, twelve TV units laid out as 4 per vehicle, each display a 10 second countdown.

Once the countdown is finished, the coupler detaches, letting riders free-fall 61 metres (200 ft) in 3.8 seconds. Each vehicle is stopped by a fail-safe magnetic braking system and arrives back into the station.

== Facts ==
The ride was originally known as Space Probe 7. The Seven Network were involved in the lead up to the ride's opening, donating the network's logo and credibility. They were contracted as major sponsors, helping with advertising, promotion and the ride's title. After this contract expired the '7' was removed from the title and was thereafter known as Space Probe.

Space Probe was the second Giant Drop ride manufactured and installed by Intamin. The first opened in October 1995 as Hellevator at Kentucky Kingdom in Louisville, Kentucky, USA. The Intamin Giant Drop was the world's tallest free-fall ride for approximately 4 months and the fastest until December, 1998. In March 1996, it was surpassed in height by the Drop Tower: Scream Zone at California's Great America by 1.2 metres (3 ft 11 in), at 68.2 metres (224 ft).

In December 1998, it was surpassed in speed by the Giant Drop at Dreamworld. The ride and queues were intensively themed around an alien invasion, in order to fit in with the horror themed area of the park (Transylvania).

The queue area was heavily themed to look like an escape hatch from a futuristic space-station. It featured a long and dark, snake-like tunnel, with TV units and lighting effects placed periodically throughout the queue. The entire conscious of the ride was based on an alien life-form infecting our planet and thus leading to evacuation. The ride starts at the entrance of the tunnel, where in queue TVs informed guests of the current situation. The TVs constantly played a roughly 30-60 minute news broadcast about an alien invasion. As the guests progressed throughout the tunnel they would be informed of the current situation, divided by which part of the tunnel they were occupying. As the guests moved closer to the front of the queue they would then be told to evacuate. The broadcast was filmed and designed to look like a modern version of a Seven Network news report.

Once the vehicle reached the top of the tower, it would then be dropped at random - a few seconds before the countdown reached zero, or held until after the countdown had finished. The first on-ride photos were taken using cameras placed at the top of the tower, inside the umbrella. The photos were taken as the vehicle was detached from the coupler. A few years later, new on-ride photo cameras were installed on the roof above the launch bay area, taken as the vehicle came to a stop.

The ride opened in 1995, three years after the opening of The Demon. It was the second and only new ride installed in the park. The official cost to build the tower was published at AUD$10 million.

Preceded by The Twilight Zone Tower of Terror	World's Tallest Vertical Drop Ride; 1995	Succeeded by Drop Tower: Scream Zone
