= Dreamworld Tower =

Tower in Queensland, Australia

Coordinates: 27°51′43.3″S 153°18′58.5″E

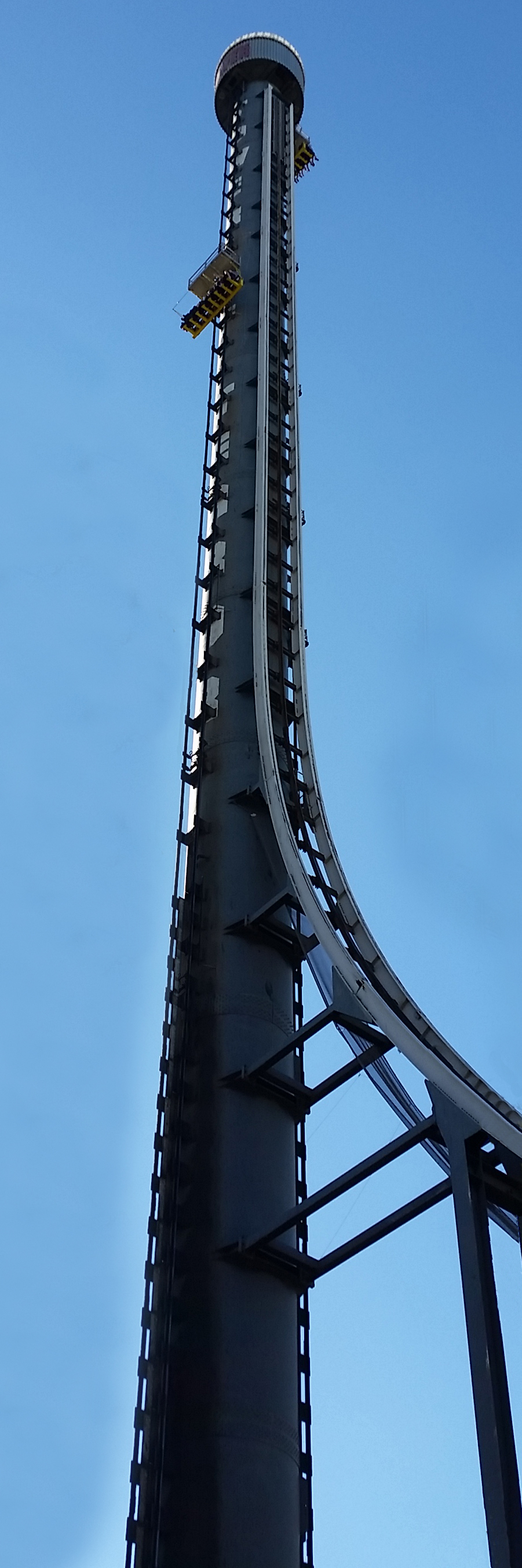
- The Dreamworld Tower supports both the Tower of Terror II and the Giant Drop.

The Giant Drop
- Opening date: 26 December 1998

Tower of Terror II
- Opening date: 23 January 1997
- Closing date: 3 November 2019
- Replaced: Tower of Terror

Ride statistics
- Manufacturer: Intamin
- Height: 119 m (390 ft)

The Dreamworld Tower is a 119-metre-high (390 ft) tower located in the Dreamworld theme park on the Gold Coast, Queensland, Australia. The Giant Drop and the former Tower of Terror II uses this tower.

== Tower design ==
The tower was designed and manufactured by Intamin, an amusement ride manufacturer. Construction costs of the tower alone exceeded A$1 million. It was the first tower and only of its kind to feature more than one amusement ride. The interior of the tower features a staircase to the top which allows crews to maintain the tower and rides.

== Rides ==
=== The Giant Drop ===
The Giant Drop is currently the world's third largest amusement ride, and was, at its debut in 1998, the tallest freefall drop in the world with a drop of 119 metres (390 ft). It conceded this title on 7 July 2012 when the Lex Luthor: Drop of Doom opened at Six Flags Magic Mountain with a drop of 122 metres (400 ft). Riders can reach a maximum speed of 135 kilometres per hour (84 mph). Riders start up the tower at a leisurely pace and are held suspended in the air for roughly 40 seconds before plummeting towards the ground.

=== Tower of Terror II ===
The Tower of Terror II was the world's fourth tallest roller coaster. It was the fifth fastest roller coaster, tying with the Superman: Escape from Krypton roller coaster at Six Flags Magic Mountain for speed. It opened on 23 January 1997 as the tallest and fastest roller coaster in the world. The actual track travels all the way up to the top of the tower; however, the actual car travels up to about 20 metres (66 ft) from the top. Riders travel at 160.9 kilometres per hour (100.0 mph), and experience up to 4.5gs. The ride was closed permanently on 3 November 2019.

== Viewing from other locations ==
The Dreamworld Tower is able to be viewed with the naked eye from Coochiemudlo Island in Moreton Bay, providing the atmospheric condition allows for this. The projected distance from the tower to the main beach on Coochiemudlo Island is 36 kilometres (22 mi). The closer sugar mill exhaust tower near Jacobs' Well is not to be confused with the viewing of the tower and appears to be the same height. This chimney appears to the left of the Dreamworld Tower when viewing from main beach.

== See also ==
- Tower of Terror II
- List of roller coaster rankings
