= Tower of Terror II =

Roller coaster at Dreamworld Australia

- Previously known as Tower of Terror

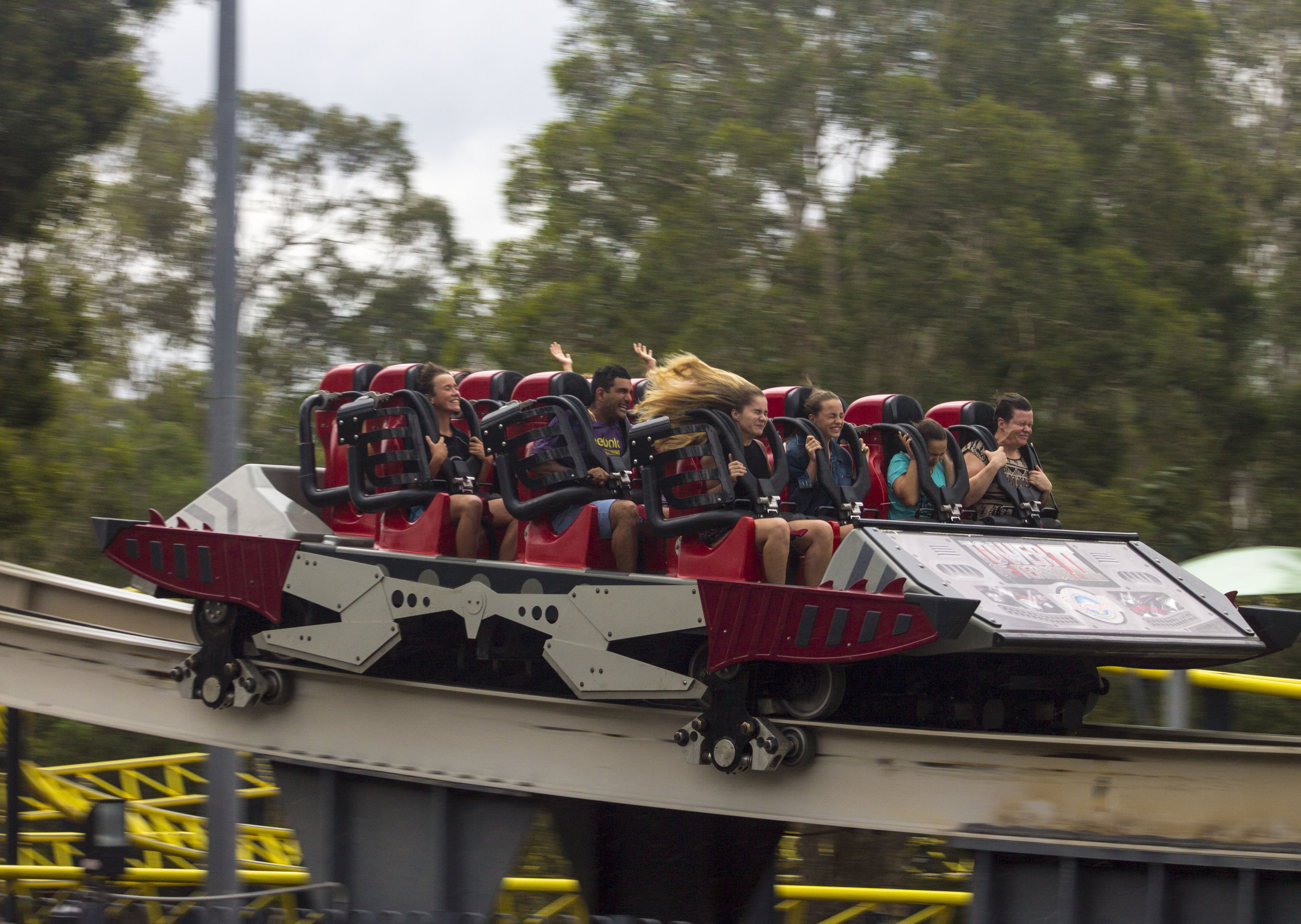
- The Escape Pod re-entering the tunnel in 2016.

Dreamworld
- Location: Dreamworld
- Park section: Main Street
- Coordinates: 27°51′50.7″S 153°19′2.6″E
- Status: Removed
- Opening date: 23 January 1997 (as Tower of Terror)
- Closing date: 3 November 2019 (as Tower of Terror II)
- Cost: A$16,000,000

General statistics
- Type: Steel – Launched – Shuttle
- Manufacturer: Intamin
- Model: Reverse Freefall Coaster
- Lift/launch system: Linear synchronous motor
- Height: 115 m (377 ft)
- Drop: 108.3 m (355 ft)
- Length: 376.4 m (1,235 ft)
- Speed: 160.9 km/h (100.0 mph)
- Inversions: 0
- Duration: 28 seconds
- Max vertical angle: 90°
- Acceleration: 0 to 160.9 km/h (0 to 100 mph) in 7 seconds
- G-force: 4.5
- Height restriction: 120 cm (3 ft 11 in)
- Maximum Height: 200 cm (6 ft 7 in)
- Vehicle: Single vehicle seating 14 passengers in one row of 2 and three rows of 4.
- Tunnel Length: 206 metres (676 ft)
- Ride Express was available
- Tower of Terror II at RCDB

The Tower of Terror II was a steel shuttle roller coaster located at the Dreamworld amusement park on the Gold Coast, Queensland, Australia. When the Tower of Terror opened on 23 January 1997, it was the first roller coaster in the world to reach 100 miles per hour (160 km/h), making it the tallest and fastest roller coaster in the world of its time. The ride was situated on the Dreamworld Tower, which also houses The Giant Drop free fall ride. The ride was originally known as the Tower of Terror until it was modified and relaunched in September 2010 as Tower of Terror II.

The steel and concrete structure cost A$16 million to construct. The original ride featured a shorter, 80-metre (260 ft) tunnel, a rigid lap bar using a hydraulic locking system, and would carry 15 passengers at a time.

The relaunched ride would take 14 passengers who it propelled to just under 161 kilometres per hour (100 mph) with a maximum of 4.5 g and 6.5 seconds of weightlessness. As of 2010, the ride was 4th in the tallest roller coaster rankings, 3rd in the tallest roller coaster drop rankings and 4th in the fastest roller coaster rankings.

On 24 October 2019, the park announced that the Tower of Terror II would close on 3 November the same year, to make room for future development and expansion to the park. The park also confirmed that The Giant Drop would continue to operate as normal, with the Tower of Terror II track being removed from the Dreamworld Tower structure over time.

== History ==
=== Construction and opening ===
The construction of the Tower of Terror required a mammoth effort by those involved. The ride features more than 600 metric tons (590 long tons; 660 short tons) of steel, 3,500 metric tons (3,400 long tons; 3,900 short tons) of concrete (which was delivered by 175 concrete trucks), 3,500 litres (770 imp gal; 920 US gal) of paint and over 16,000 bolts which hold the structure together. Total construction costs were estimated to be A$16 million.

On 23 January 1997, the Tower of Terror was officially opened by Rob Borbidge, Premier of Queensland at the time. A plaque was dedicated in its honour detailing its opening status as the tallest and fastest ride in the world.

=== Original ride ===
The original Tower of Terror ride was themed as an "escape pod" launch from a futuristic skyscraper to a distant building. Earthquakes had supposedly made the building unstable and unexplained nuclear hazards were contaminating the building. Riders took the role of people queuing for the escape pods through the corridors and stairwells of the building, at one point crossing a depth illusion giving the impression of being high above a ruined city. Whilst the optical illusion and decoration of the queuing area remains, the backstory of the ride was no longer given.

Upon reaching the front of the queue, 15 riders boarded the "escape pod". Riders would be launched forwards out of a shorter, 80-metre (260 ft) tunnel at a rate of 160.9 kilometres per hour (100.0 mph) before travelling up the 115-metre (377 ft) tower. The car then returned along the track backwards under the force of gravity and was slowed by electromagnets as it re-entered the tunnel. Riders would then complete the thematic "escape" by travelling down a lift to safety.

Just 0.25 seconds after the initial launch, an on-ride camera would take photographs of riders.

==== Escape Pod ====
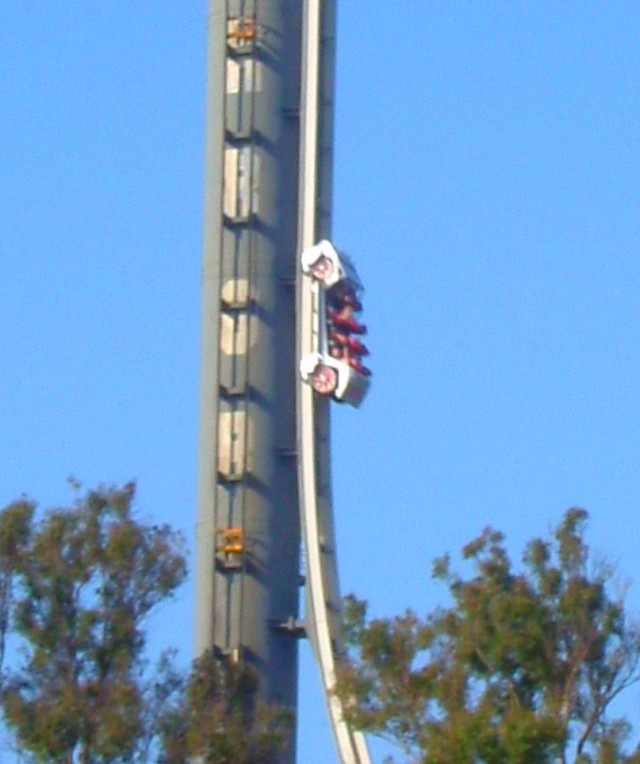
The original Escape Pod launching up the Dreamworld Tower.

The first steel passenger vehicle, known as the Escape Pod, would carry 15 passengers in four rows and weighed around 6 metric tons (5.9 long tons; 6.6 short tons). The car was equipped with four large steel road wheels that run on the track, measuring 600 millimetres (24 in) in diameter at the front and 900 millimetres (35 in) at the rear. Smaller jockey wheels run on the other side of the track such that the track sits between the pairs of wheels.

The original Tower of Terror's restraint system consisted of a thick, rigid lap bar with hand grips mounted to the lap bar.

These restraints used a hydraulic locking system (rather than a ratchet) which allowed them to be pulled down to any position; when "locked", they could move down to any position but not up. In contrast, a ratchet-based restraint only locks at each "notch", and will often be too loose or uncomfortably tight for riders. The minimum height restriction was 120 centimetres (47 in), the same as most other major coasters. In addition, it was actually possible for a rider to be too tall to ride the Tower of Terror, if they are over 200 centimetres (79 in) tall.

=== Relaunch ===
The first speculations about a relaunch of the Tower of Terror began in December 2009. A Gold Coast Bulletin report detailed a variety of new attractions for the Gold Coast theme parks including the major relaunch of one of Dreamworld's Big 7 Thrill Rides. Although the Tower of Terror was not mentioned in the article, amusement park fanatics agreed that the Tower of Terror would be the most likely to receive the makeover. In February 2010, further fuel was added to the fire when a theme park reporter commented on the possibility of the Tower of Terror featuring a new, backwards launching vehicle. Towards the end of April 2010, steel framework arrived beside the Tower of Terror's launch track. The curved parts confirmed rumours that the tunnel would be extended. In August 2010, Dreamworld officially announced through their website that the Tower of Terror would cease operations on 18 August 2010 and would reopen as the Tower of Terror II in time for the September school holidays. Dreamworld confirmed the rumour that the launch will be in reverse out of the newly extended 206-metre (676 ft) tunnel. The ride was relaunched on 17 September 2010.

=== Retirement ===
Just months after the closure of Wipeout, the park announced on 25 October 2019 that the Tower of Terror ll would cease operation on 3 November of the same year. The park cited "focusing our investment on the future and delivering new, world-class attractions for you to enjoy" as the reason for closing the attraction, along with initial details regarding a multi-million dollar expansion to the park. The expansion is set to include a new Multi-launch coaster, as well as a major refurbishment to ABC Kids World. The park also confirmed that The Giant Drop will continue to operate as normal. The demolition of Tower of Terror II began in March 2020 with the removal of some track pieces.

As of July 2021 the ride's demolition was substantially completed.

== Ride experience ==
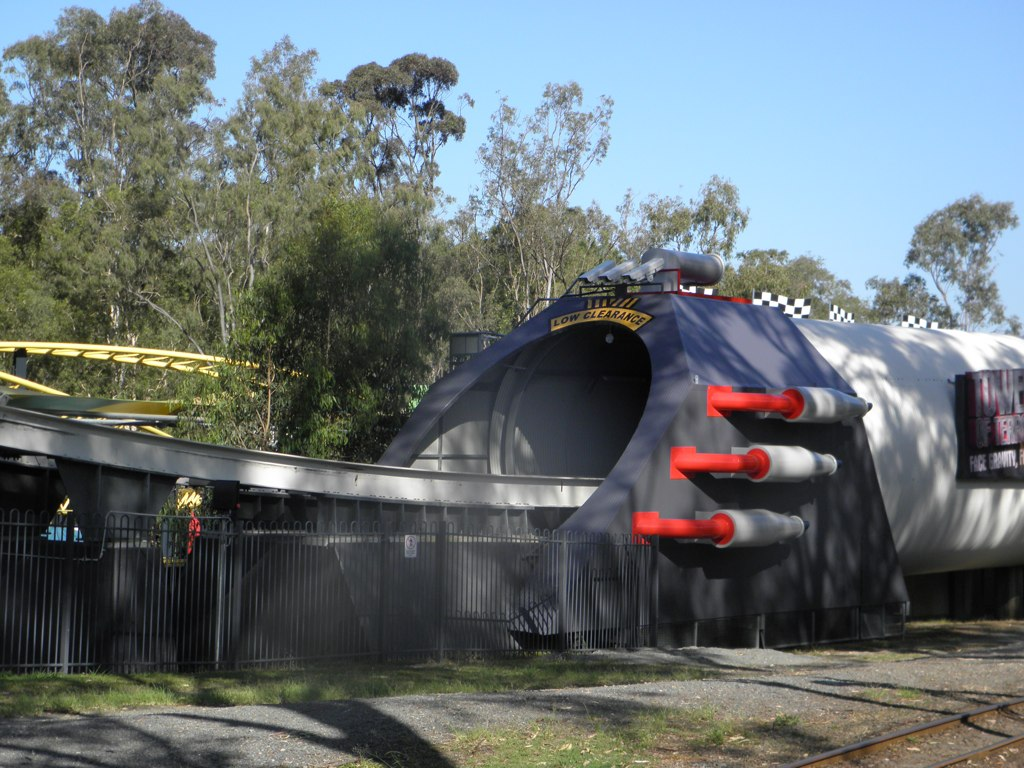
Tower of Terror II's entrance back into the tunnel features a Low Clearance sign.

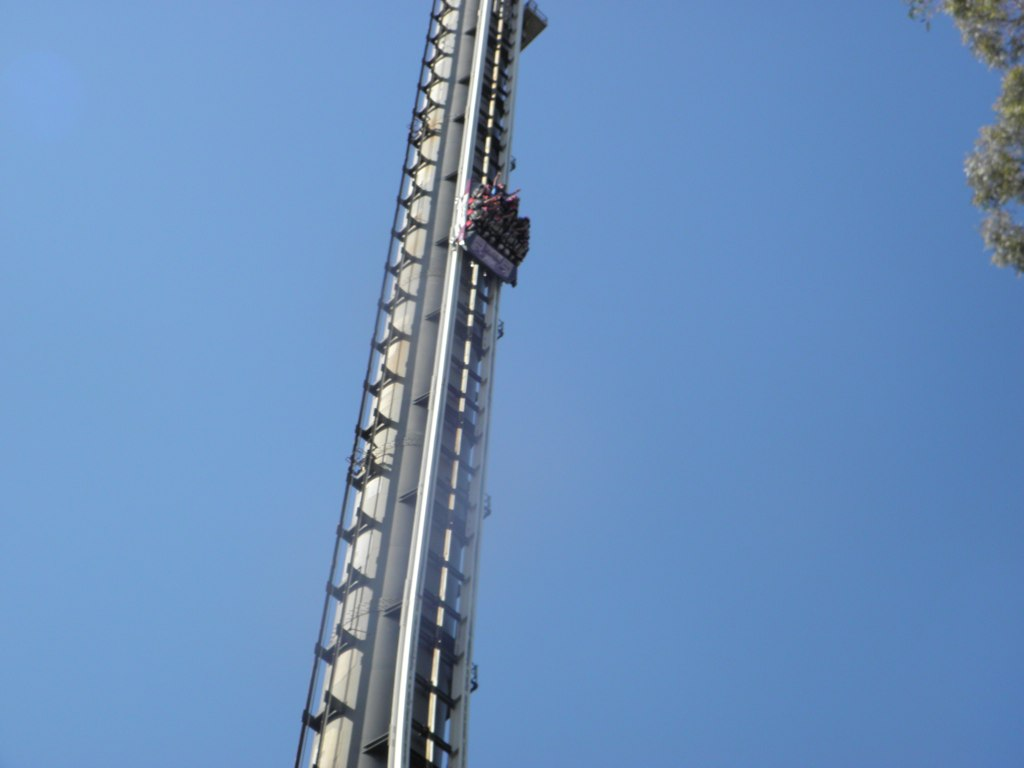
Tower of Terror II's new car descending the Dreamworld Tower.

=== Queue and station ===
The queue begins with a footpath that extends from the underpass linking Tiger Island and Wiggles World, to the inside of an 11-meter-tall (36-foot) skull. From there, the line bends into a tunnel where riders have to walk 270 degrees anti-clockwise, crossing a metal bridge below which a model city is displayed. This was followed by some stairs at the top of which was a Dreamworld staff member in charge of letting people pass. Fourteen people at a time are allowed to pass through to the second waiting area where they wait for instructions to proceed. In the third waiting area, riders are asked to form four queues with two people in the front queue and four people in each of the remaining three queues. The doors to the Escape Pod then open up, allowing riders to embark.

In the station, a kicker tyre system was used to propel the car into the launch, and also to stop the returning car. Once in the launch, a linear synchronous motor (LSM) system was used to accelerate the car along the horizontal part of the track, and also to slow the returning car.

=== Vehicle ===
The new 5-metric-ton (4.9-long-ton; 5.5-short-ton) passenger vehicle, called the 'Escape Pod', seats 14 riders in a configuration consisting of three rows of 4 and one of two. The vehicle features a lower profile than its predecessor.

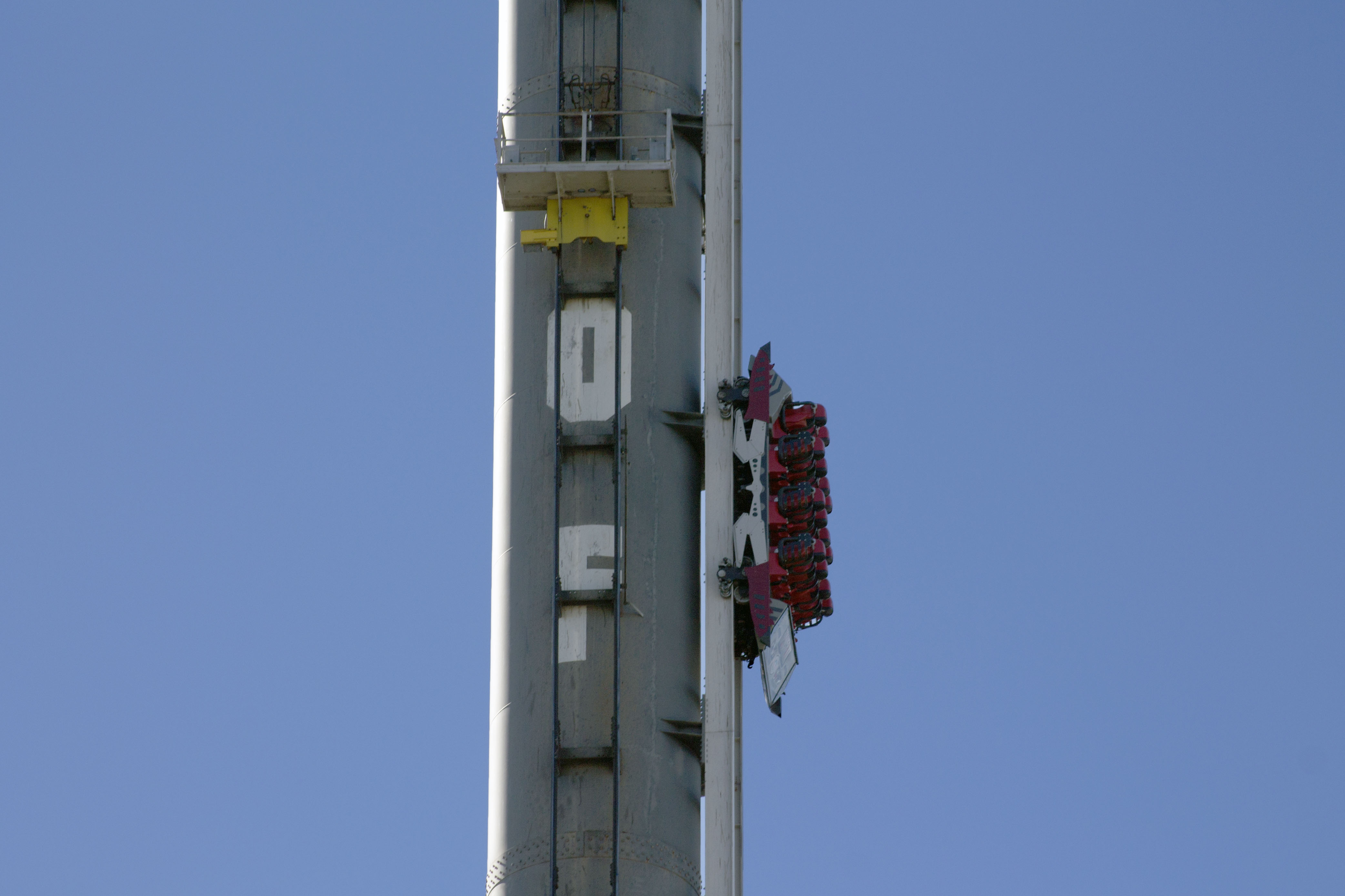
Tower of Terror II Escape Pod pictured ascending the Dreamworld Tower.

=== Layout ===
Up to 14 riders at a time are electro-magnetically accelerated to 160.9 kilometres per hour (100.0 mph) in seven seconds along the extended, 206-metre (676 ft) launch tunnel. The track then pitches up 90 degrees to the vertical, with the passengers pulling 4.5 g. Riders are almost weightless during the entire vertical section of the ride for about 6.5 seconds, 3.25 seconds going up and 3.25 seconds falling back down. The car then pitches back down to horizontal and enters the tunnel where an on-ride camera takes photographs of riders. The vehicle continues to hurtle back into the station where it comes to a fairly rapid stop.

=== Exit ===
Following the ride, riders are let out an exit on the opposite side to the entry, which leads into a passageway containing a metal lift. This takes the riders back down to ground level and opens up to the Tower of Terror Warehouse merchandise shop. The shop contains souvenirs and photos of the riders in the Escape Pod for purchase.

== In popular culture ==
The Tower of Terror was featured on the opening sequences of Big Brother Australia from 2001 to 2004.

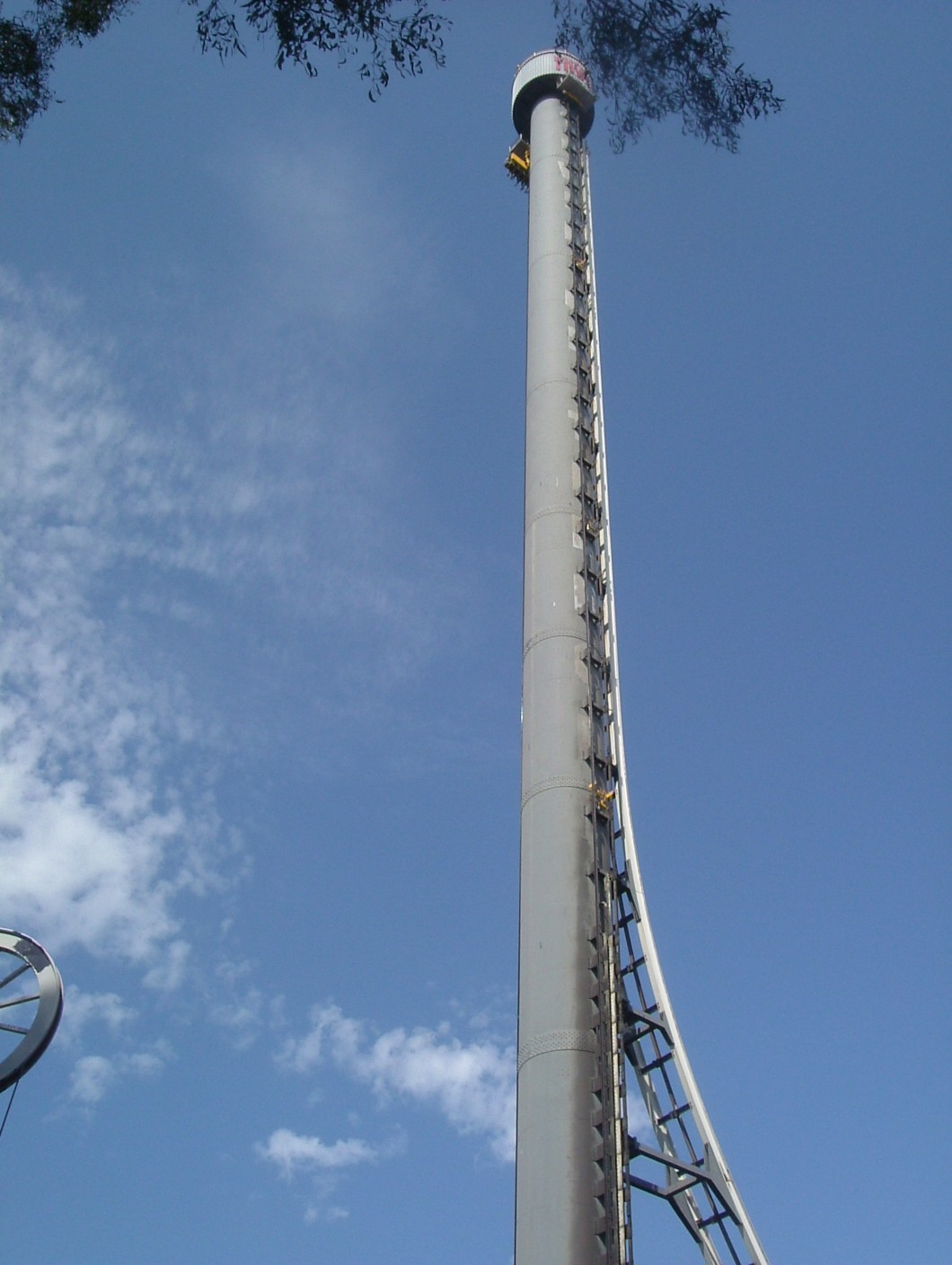
The Dreamworld Tower which houses the Tower of Terror II and the Giant Drop.

== Records ==
At the time of opening, in January 1997, the Tower of Terror was the tallest and fastest roller coaster in the world. The ride held this title by itself for two months until it was superseded by in height by a twin-tracked version named Superman: The Escape (since similarly rethemed as Superman: Escape from Krypton), located at Six Flags Magic Mountain in the United States. Although the ride experience of the two rides is identical, the structure of Superman: The Escape is slightly taller. The title of the World's Fastest Roller Coaster was shared between the two rides for the next four years until Dodonpa at Fuji-Q Highland opened in December 2001. The title of the World's Tallest Roller Coaster Drop remained for a longer period of time. In 2003, Top Thrill Dragster opened at Cedar Point with a drop 21 metres (69 ft) taller than the drop of the Tower of Terror.

When it was removed, Tower of Terror II was still the fourth-tallest, the fifth-fastest, and had the third-longest drop among steel roller coasters in the world.

Preceded by Fujiyama	World's Fastest Roller Coaster; January 1997 – December 2001	Succeeded by Dodonpa
Preceded by Fujiyama	World's Tallest Roller Coaster Drop; January 1997 – May 2003	Succeeded by Top Thrill Dragster
Preceded by Fujiyama	World's Tallest Roller Coaster; January 1997 – March 1997	Succeeded by Superman: The Escape
