= Drop Tower (Six Flags) =

Drop towers at Great America

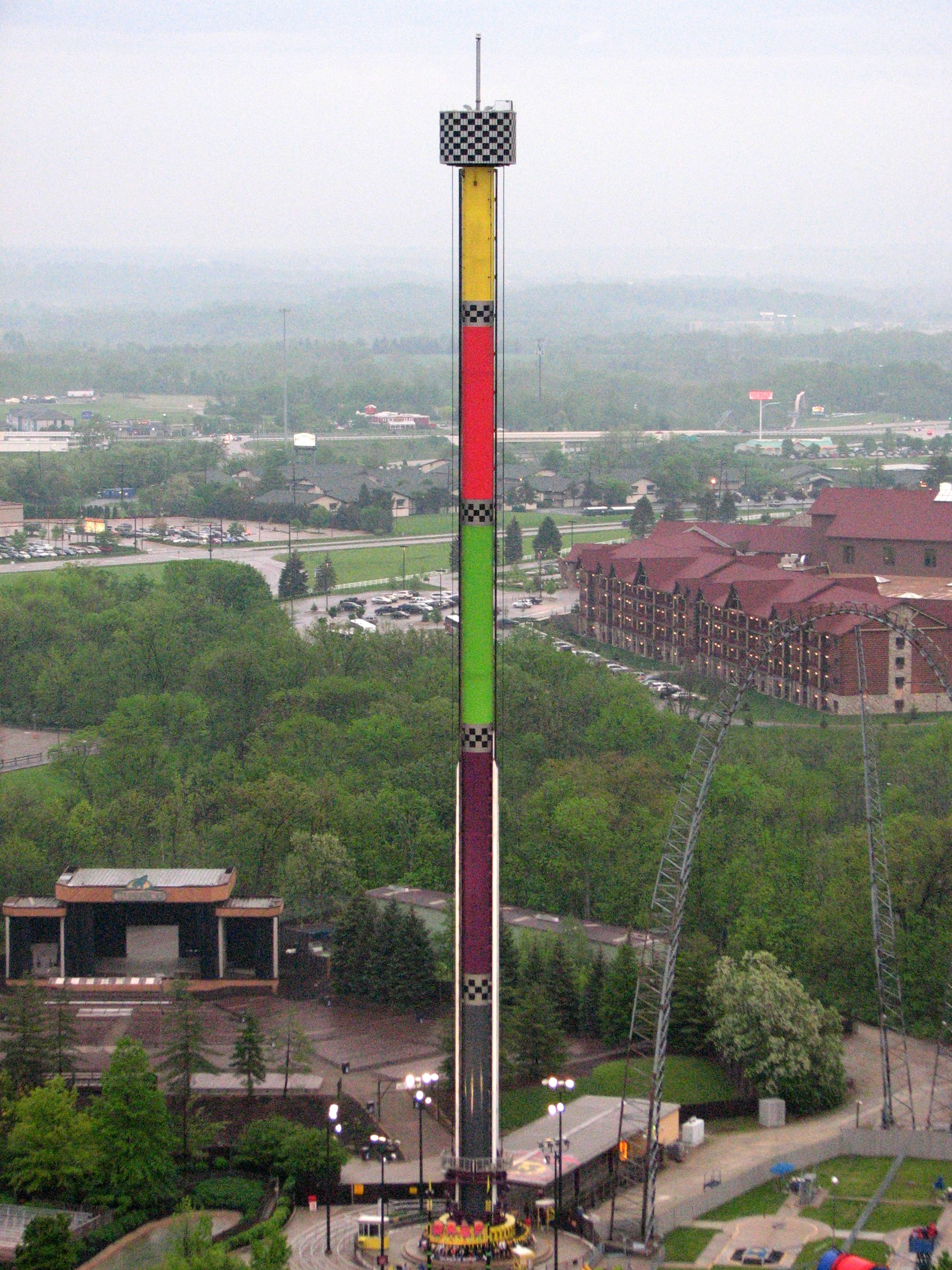
- Drop Tower at Kings Island

California's Great America
- Area: NorCal County Fair
- Coordinates: 37°23′36.72″N 121°58′18.05″W
- Status: Operating
- Opening date: March 16, 1996
- Replaced: Ameri-Go-Round

Canada's Wonderland
- Area: Medieval Faire
- Coordinates: 43°50′39.88″N 79°32′34.06″W
- Status: Operating
- Opening date: May 4, 1997

Carowinds
- Area: Thrill Zone
- Coordinates: 35°06′17.72″N 80°56′38.86″W
- Status: Removed
- Opening date: March 30, 1996
- Closing date: 2024

Kings Dominion
- Area: Candy Apple Grove
- Coordinates: 37°50′15.96″N 77°26′38.10″W
- Status: Operating
- Opening date: March 22, 2003

Kings Island
- Area: Action Zone
- Coordinates: 39°20′45.80″N 84°15′59.07″W
- Status: Operating
- Opening date: May 21, 1999

Ride statistics
- Attraction type: Drop tower
- Manufacturer: Intamin
- Model: Gyro Drop, or Giant Drop
- Height restriction: 48 or 54 in (122 or 137 cm)
- Previous name: Drop Zone: Stunt Tower
- Fast Lane available at all four parks

Drop Tower, formerly known as Drop Zone: Stunt Tower, is the name of four drop tower amusement rides located at Six Flags amusement parks in the United States and Canada. A fifth installation which operated at Carowinds closed after the 2024 season. Although each installation was manufactured by Intamin, they all vary in size and capacity. On November 6, 2026, Six Flags announced that California’s Great America would be permanently closing on September 6, 2027.

== History ==
Prior to their acquisition by Cedar Fair, the five parks owned by Paramount Parks featured a drop tower ride named Drop Zone: Stunt Tower, in reference to the Paramount film of the same name. All were built by Swiss ride manufacturer Intamin, which consist of either Gyro Drop or Giant Drop models. Martin & Vleminckx constructed the Intamin-built Drop Tower at California's Great America on the former site of a very similar ride called "The Edge", which was removed to make room for Drop Zone. With the exception of both Kings Dominion's and Canada's Wonderland's towers, they are located in their park's various backlot themed areas. When Paramount owned and operated the parks, stunt performers performed an action scene periodically near the attraction depicting a performer falling from a platform.

In 2006, Paramount Parks sold their amusement parks to Cedar Fair, which was followed by the removal of Paramount branding from each park. All five attractions were renamed Drop Tower: Scream Zone (commonly shortened to Drop Tower), and the swirl logos associated with each were removed from the rides' signage.

== Ride experience ==
=== Giant Drop ===
The three original drop towers, opening in 1996 and 1997 at Carowinds, California's Great America, and Canada's Wonderland are Giant Drop models. They feature either four, five or six cars fitting four people on each one. Wonderland and Great America's models fall at a top speed of 62 mph (100 km/h) and are 227 feet (69 m) tall, while Carowinds' model fell at 56 mph (90 km/h) and was 160 ft (49 m) tall.

All three were originally painted in rainbow colors with race track decals. When Cedar Fair took ownership of the parks in 2006, the ride in California received a new purple and red color scheme. In 2019, Drop Tower at California's Great America was given a brown and green tree-like paint scheme, paying homage to Northern California forests. The installation at Canada’s Wonderland still retains its original color scheme.

=== Gyro Drop ===
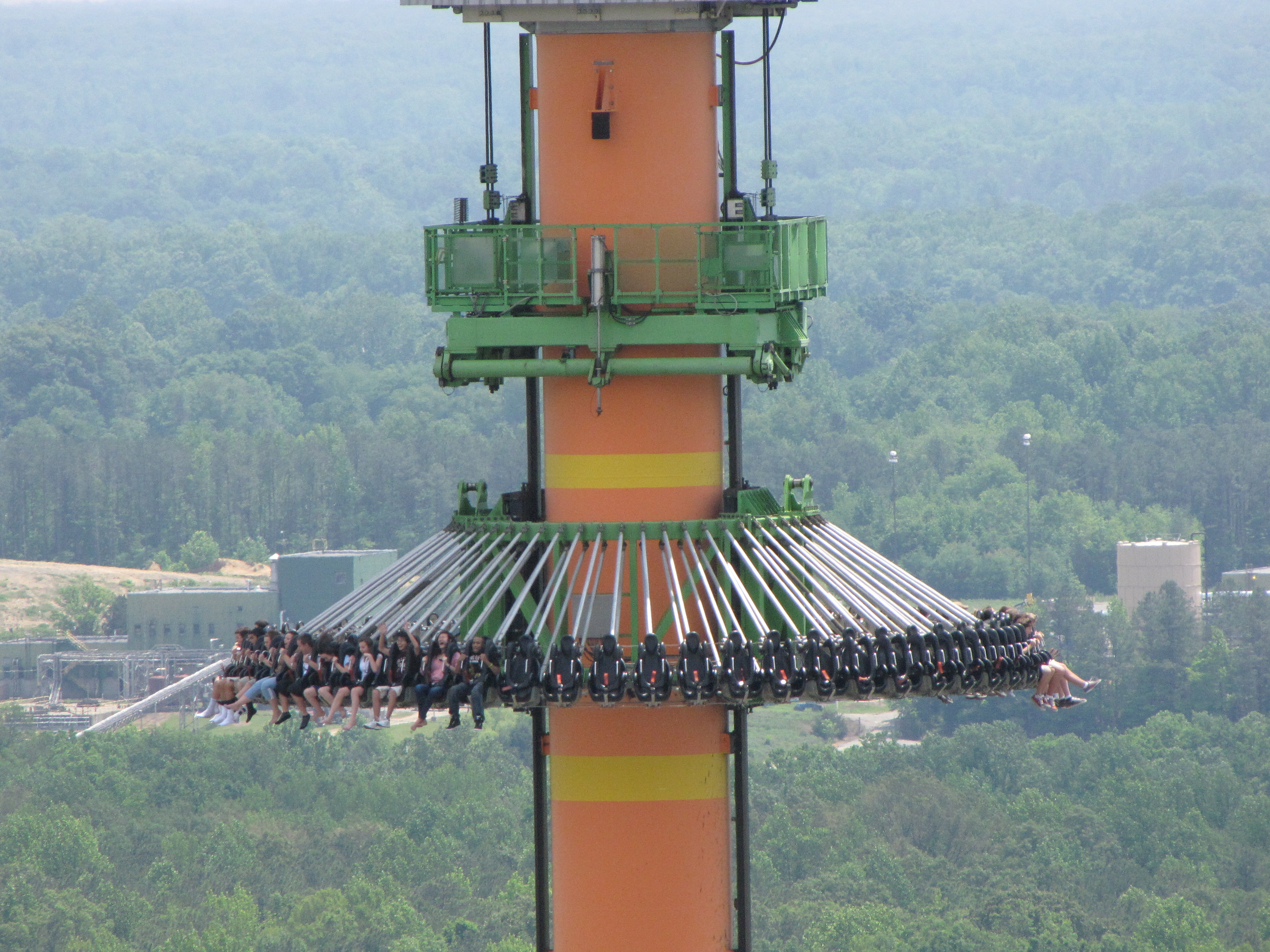
Drop Tower at Kings Dominion, as viewed from the Eiffel Tower

The two latest drop towers, installed in 1999 at Kings Island and 2003 at Kings Dominion, are Gyro Drop models with one large circular car, reaching speeds of 67 and 72 mph (116 km/h), respectively. Both Kings Island and Kings Dominion claim their respective attractions to be the tallest Gyro Drop towers in the world. Kings Island’s tower is measured as the tallest in the world, while Kings Dominion's tower utilizes brakes positioned closer to the ground, producing a longer drop than the tower at Kings Island. The Kings Island variant also spins on the way up, giving riders a view of the whole park.

== Locations ==
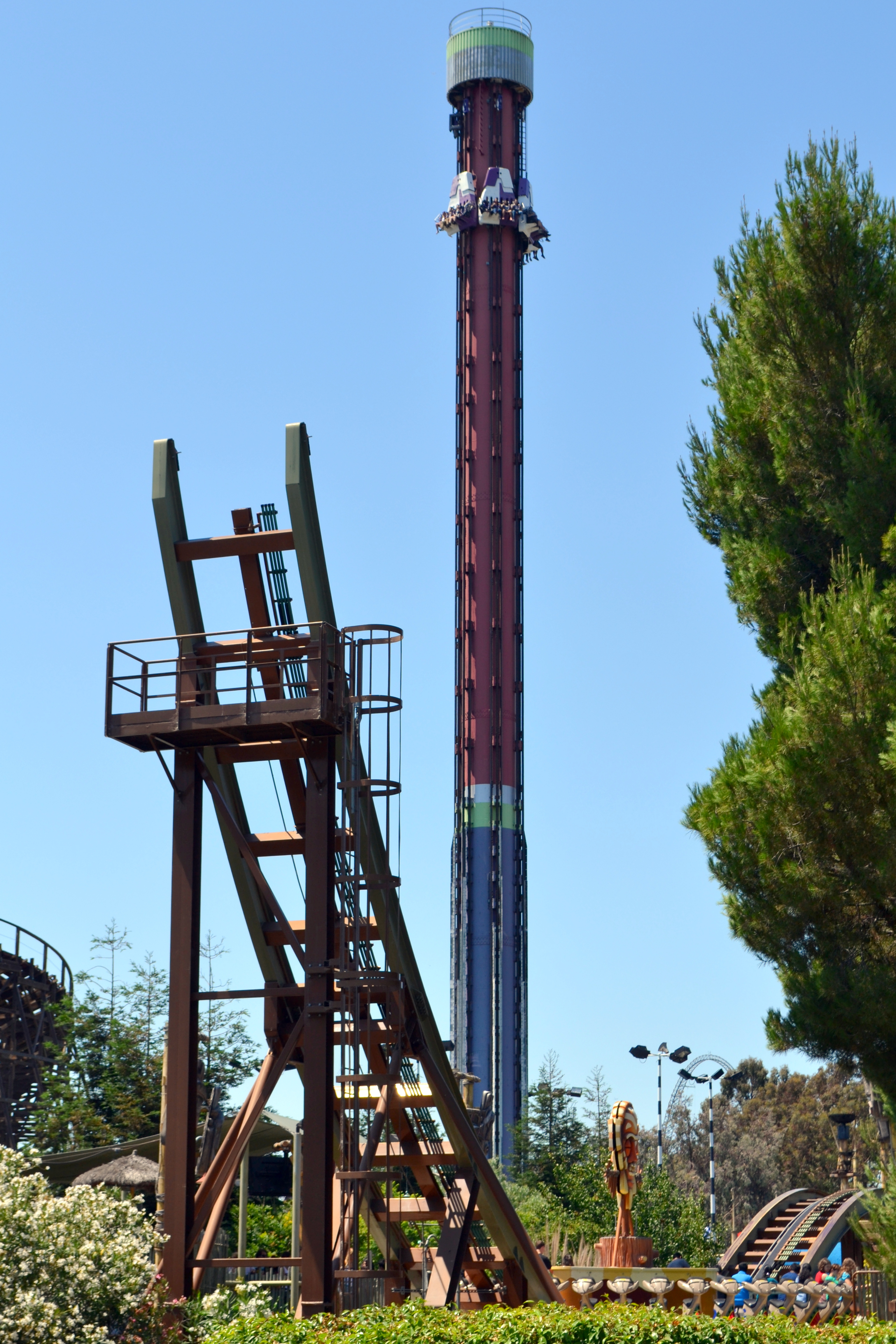
The Drop Tower at California's Great America

Park	Tower height	Drop height*	Speed	Model	Opened	Closed	Height requirement
Canada's Wonderland	230 feet (70 m)	200 feet (61 m)	62 mph (100 km/h)	Giant Drop	May 4, 1997		54 in (137 cm)
Carowinds	174 feet (53 m)	160 feet (49 m)	56 mph (90 km/h)	Giant Drop	March 30, 1996	2024	54 in (137 cm)
California's Great America	224 feet (68 m)	207 feet (63 m)	62 mph (100 km/h)	Giant Drop	March 16, 1996		54 in (137 cm)
Kings Dominion	305 feet (93 m)	272 feet (83 m)	72 mph (116 km/h)	Ring Drop	March 22, 2003		48 in (122 cm)
Kings Island	315 feet (96 m)	264 feet (80 m)	67 mph (108 km/h)	Gyro Drop	May 21, 1999		48 in (122 cm)

- *Drop height is only the space between the top of the tower and the braking, what is considered the "freefall" section.

== Incidents ==
- On May 17, 1996, one of the cars on Drop Tower in Carowinds failed to ascend to the top of the tower after the safety control system locked the brakes. Park maintenance was unable to manually release the braking system. Three riders were stranded 160 feet (49 m) in the air for nearly three hours before being rescued.
- On August 22, 1999, Joshua Smurphat, a 12-year-old boy was killed after falling from the Drop Tower installation at California's Great America. His family claimed the harness was not locked properly and he had a mental disability. An investigation was inconclusive and no charges were filed. Following the incident, the rest of the Drop Tower locations were shut down for inspections.

== Records ==
California Great America's installation was the tallest vertical drop amusement park ride when it opened in 1996.

Preceded by Space Probe	World's Tallest Vertical Drop Ride; 1996	Succeeded by Pitt Fall
