= Lex Luthor: Drop of Doom =

Drop tower ride

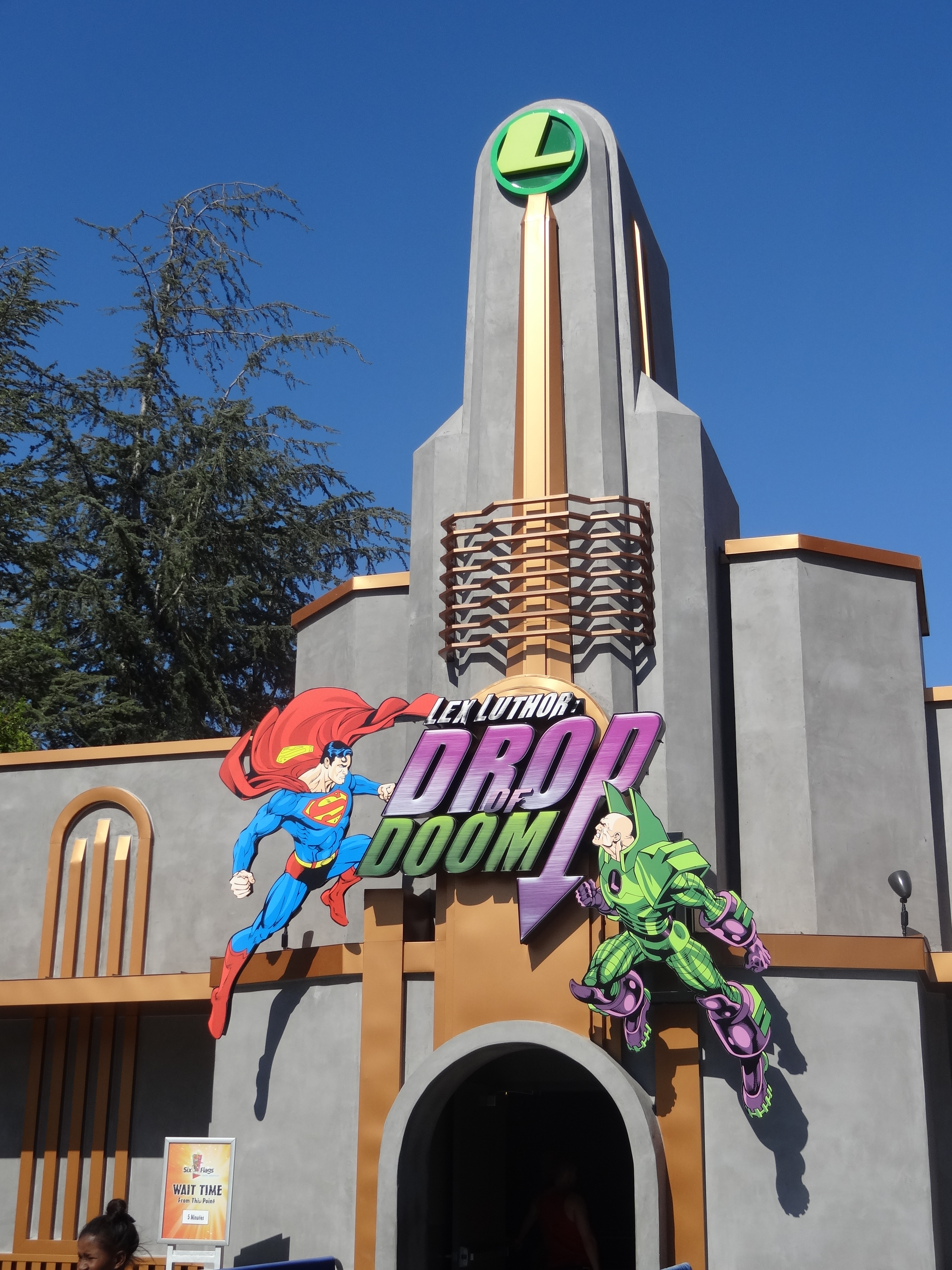
- Lex Luthor: Drop of Doom entrance

Six Flags Magic Mountain
- Area: DC Universe
- Coordinates: 34.426616°N 118.598089°W
- Status: Operating
- Opening date: July 7, 2012

Ride statistics
- Attraction type: Drop tower
- Manufacturer: Intamin
- Theme: Lex Luthor
- Height: 400 ft (120 m)
- Speed: 85 mph (137 km/h)
- Capacity: 550 riders per hour
- Vehicle type: Gondola
- Vehicles: 2
- Riders per vehicle: 8
- Duration: 1:17
- Height restriction: 48 in (122 cm)
- Fast Lane available
- Must transfer from wheelchair

Lex Luthor: Drop of Doom is a drop tower located at Six Flags Magic Mountain in Valencia, California. The ride is integrated onto the existing now-defunct Superman: Escape from Krypton tower structure.

== History ==
=== Construction and opening ===
On August 25, 2011, Six Flags Magic Mountain released a "GoBigCam" video. The video concluded hinting at a possible new attraction in 2012 to be installed on Superman: Escape from Krypton. On September 1, 2011, Six Flags Magic Mountain officially announced that they would be adding Intamin drop towers to the sides of the Superman: Escape from Krypton tower.

On February 5, 2012, Superman: Escape from Krypton closed, so that the park could start construction of Lex Luthor: Drop of Doom on the coaster. Superman: Escape from Krypton was expected to reopen when Lex Luthor: Drop of Doom opened to the public. In middle to late March, the electrical part of the ride was constructed to operate the drop tower. Pieces for the lower part of drop tower arrived at the park on April 2, 2012.

On April 12, 2012, pieces of the ride were taken up in the air by helicopter above the Superman tower (415 feet (126 m) in the air) to connect the ride pieces to the tower. During the first week of May, vertical pieces for Lex Luthor: Drop of Doom were attached to the Superman tower. By the second week of May, all the pieces for the ride were attached to the tower. By May 30, the ride gondolas were placed onto the tower to start testing. Testing began on June 22, two weeks before it opened to the public on July 7, 2012.

=== Operation ===
During the 2018 season, Lex Luthor: Drop of Doom offered a virtual reality experience for a limited time. The experience would be called DC Super Heroes: Drop of Doom VR. Riders had the option to wear Samsung Gear VR headsets, powered by Oculus to create a 360-degree, 3D experience while riding. The experience put guests in a battle between Lex Luthor, Superman and Wonder Woman. Lex Luthor would use his anti-gravity ray gun to levitate guests above the skyscrapers as the two heroes battled the Lex Bots. At the end, the anti-gravity ray gun exploded, causing guests to plummet towards the streets. This was the second attraction at Six Flags Magic Mountain to be equipped with virtual reality, with the first one being The New Revolution.

== Ride experience ==
=== Queue ===
Guests enter the Lexcorp headquarters, the lair of Lex Luthor. Inside, there are posters advertising Luthor's different corporations such as LexAir, LexPower, Lexcom, and Lexcorp. One wall features blueprints for Lexcorp weapons. One wall features a picture of Lex and the company goal. At the far end is a fake elevator and Lex Luthor's Power suit, his weapon for fighting Superman. From time to time Lex can be heard welcoming guests and thanking them for volunteering to test his newest project. These recordings often feature ominous sayings to tell the guests that something is wrong. Guests then move through a secure access hallway, passing company mottos and offices. This hallway even has a door labeled Research & Development, which is the Flash Pass entrance. Heading outside, guests walk down a short pathway before reaching the loading area. The ride has a single rider line, which is located near the exit. Guests will stand in front of the chain and wait for the ride operator to direct them to the next available seat.

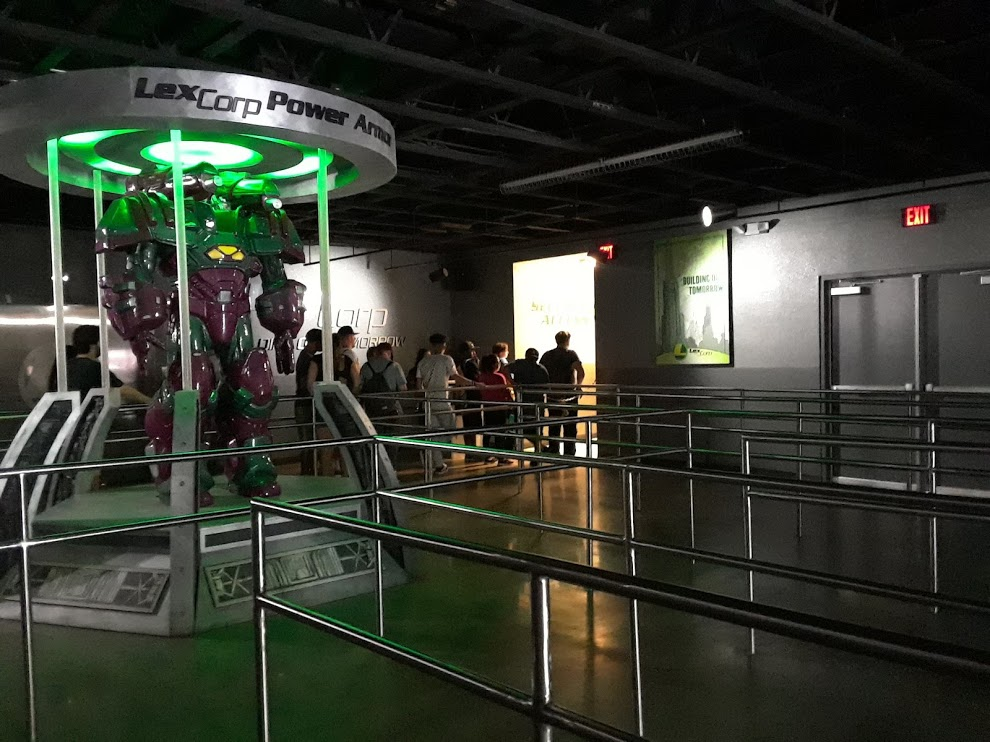
The station for Lex Luthor Drop of Doom

=== Ride ===
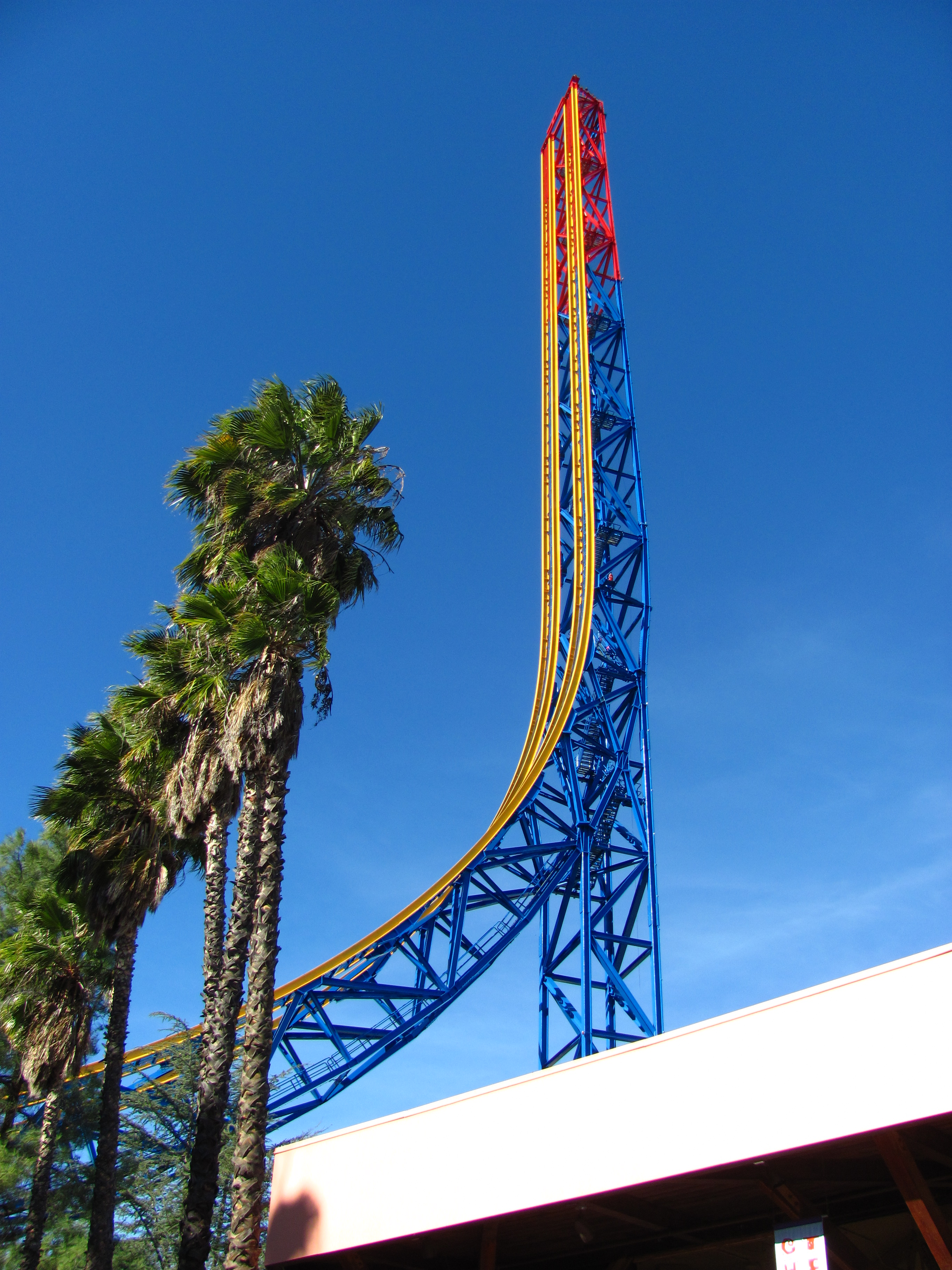
Superman: Escape from Krypton in 2011, prior to the addition of Lex Luthor: Drop of Doom on the lateral flanks of the structure the following year.

Lex Luthor: Drop of Doom consists of two towers, with each mounted to a lateral flank of the Superman: Escape from Krypton structure. Both rides feature a single floorless gondola seating eight-abreast. Riders are harnessed in by over-the-shoulder restraints. Catch cars hoist the gondolas up the tower for approximately 60 seconds before reaching a dynamic height of 400 feet (120 m). As the gondolas reach the apex, riders are greeted with a pre-recorded audio spiel from Lex Luthor. The gondolas are then released into 5-second free fall descent, attaining a terminal velocity of 85 miles per hour (137 km/h). Mass of the gondolas is 600 kilograms (1,300 lb) without any riders.

When the Superman: Escape from Krypton and Lex Luthor: Drop of Doom operate simultaneously, the steel framework tower that supports both rides is likely to sway as much as 2 feet (0.61 m) side to side.

== Records ==
Lex Luthor: Drop of Doom was the tallest drop tower ride in the world at the time of its opening, having superseded The Giant Drop located at Dreamworld on July 7, 2012. Its record was broken on July 4, 2014, by Zumanjaro: Drop of Doom when it opened at Six Flags Great Adventure. Following Zumanjaro's closure in 2024, it has reclaimed its title as the world's tallest drop tower.

Preceded by The Giant Drop	World's Tallest Vertical Drop Tower; 7 July 2012 – July 4, 2014; 11 November 2024 – 31 December 2025	Succeeded by Zumanjaro: Drop of Doom
Preceded by Zumanjaro: Drop of Doom	World's Tallest Vertical Drop Tower; 7 July 2012 – July 4, 2014; 11 November 2024 – 31 December 2025	Succeeded by Sirocco Tower

== Height requirements ==
In order for guests to ride Lex Luthor: Drop of Doom, riders must be at least 48 inches (121 centimeters). Each seat includes an individual over the shoulder restraint. Due to the aggressiveness, very high height and very fast speed of this ride, it is not labeled by Six Flags Magic Mountain as a family friendly ride. The park labels the ride as maximum in the intensity thrill rating. Guests who have acrophobia, high blood pressure, diabetes, epilepsy, pregnancy or other health problems are forbidden from riding this attraction.

== See also ==
- 2012 in amusement parks
- Dreamworld Tower
- Superman: Escape from Krypton
- Zumanjaro: Drop of Doom, a defunct drop tower with a similar name at another Six Flags park, Six Flags Great Adventure
