= Zumanjaro: Drop of Doom =

Defunct drop tower amusement ride

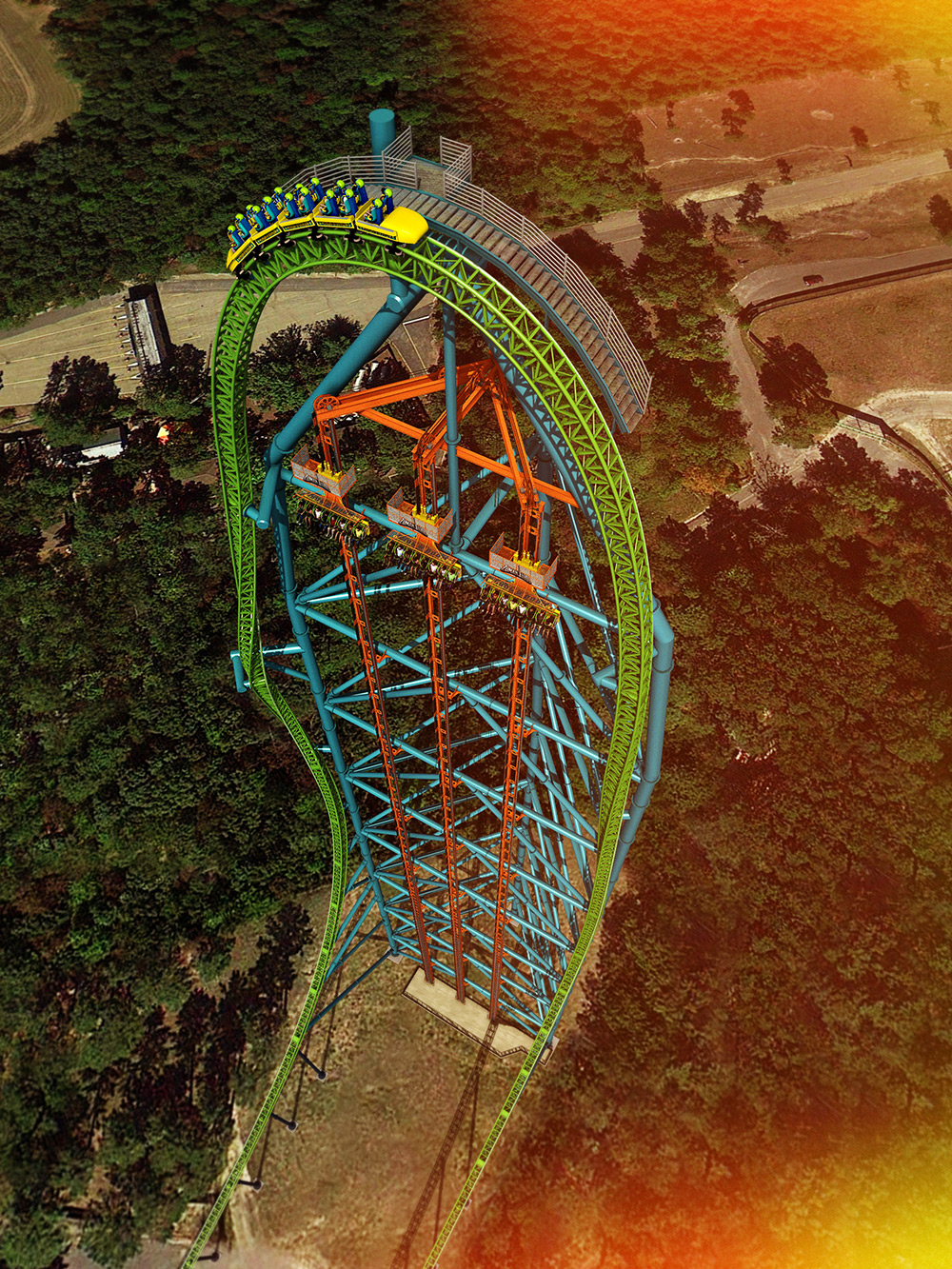
- Zumanjaro and Kingda Ka rendering art

Six Flags Great Adventure
- Area: Golden Kingdom
- Coordinates: 40.140623°N 74.433543°W
- Status: Removed
- Opening date: July 4, 2014
- Closing date: November 14, 2024 (Note: The official closure and removal of the ride was announced on November 14, but it was already closed for the season at the time, following several months of sporadic operation.)
- Replaced: Rolling Thunder
- Replaced by: Bakunawa

Ride statistics
- Attraction type: Drop tower
- Manufacturer: Intamin
- Height: 415 ft (126 m)
- Speed: 90 mph (140 km/h)
- Vehicles: 3
- Riders per vehicle: 8
- Height restriction: 48–77 in (122–196 cm)
- Flash Pass was available
- Single rider line was available

Zumanjaro: Drop of Doom (/zuːmɪnˈdʒɑːroʊ/, zoo-man-JARR-OH) was an amusement ride located at Six Flags Great Adventure in Jackson Township, New Jersey. The 415 ft (126 m) attraction was attached to the Kingda Ka roller coaster, and opened as the tallest drop tower ride in the world in 2014. In November 2024, after months of rumors and speculation regarding the future of the attraction, Six Flags Great Adventure announced that Zumanjaro and Kingda Ka had permanently closed, and the rides were demolished and removed from the park.

== History ==
On May 21, 2005, Kingda Ka opened to the public and became the tallest and fastest roller coaster in the world at that time, overtaking both world records from Top Thrill Dragster at Cedar Point.

Rumors that Six Flags Great Adventure would be adding a drop tower attached to Kingda Ka, similar to Lex Luthor: Drop of Doom at Six Flags Magic Mountain, emerged in February 2012. In August, theme park enthusiast website Screamscape mentioned that Rolling Thunder may be removed at the end of the 2013 season.

On August 29, 2013, Six Flag's chairman, president, and CEO, Jim Reid-Anderson, officially announced Zumanjaro: Drop of Doom for the 2014 season, which would be attached to Kingda Ka, along with the other new rides to be built at other Six Flags parks. In the press release, it was confirmed that Rolling Thunder would close on September 8, 2013, and be demolished. The new ride is inspired by the park's 2013 addition, Safari Off Road Adventure. The area adjacent to the Zumanjaro: Drop of Doom would be a new habitat for African baboons, which will replace the 2011 addition, Safari Discoveries.

On April 1, 2014, the final track piece for the drop tower ride was erected into place by park construction crews. The ride opened to the public on July 4, 2014.

=== Opening ===
Zumanjaro: Drop of Doom was first slated to open originally during the Memorial Day Weekend of 2014. Two weeks before opening the new attraction along with the reopening of Kingda Ka, Six Flags Great Adventure delayed its opening due to the weather during the construction of the ride with its extreme heights. Despite the delayed opening in late May, Kingda Ka reopened only during the weekends of the summer until the opening of the drop tower. On June 26, 2014, Six Flags Great Adventure announced the opening of the new attraction for the Fourth of July holiday weekend. Hours before the soft-opening of Zumanjaro: Drop of Doom on July 2, 2014, the theme park delayed the opening of the drop tower again for the second time. Six Flags Great Adventure stated that the state of New Jersey had not granted the park the operating permit to open the new drop tower. However, two days after the second delayed opening, the park opened the ride to the public on July 4, 2014.

=== Closure ===
After operating sporadically in the Spring and early Summer of 2024, the park closed Zumanjaro for the season unusually early, with little explanation. In late summer of 2024, rumors began circulating regarding the potential removal of Kingda Ka and Zumanjaro. On November 14, 2024, Six Flags announced that Kingda Ka would be "retired" in order to make way for a "multi-world-record-breaking launch roller coaster". The park later confirmed that the drop tower had also closed.

Zumanjaro and Kingda Ka were demolished on February 28, 2025.

=== VR ===
In 2017, virtual reality headsets were added as an optional feature on the ride, which were Samsung Gear VR headsets powered by Oculus. Riders wearing the headsets would experience a 360-degree, 3D simulation of being in a futuristic helicopter that was fending off an attack by mutant spiders.

== Ride experience ==
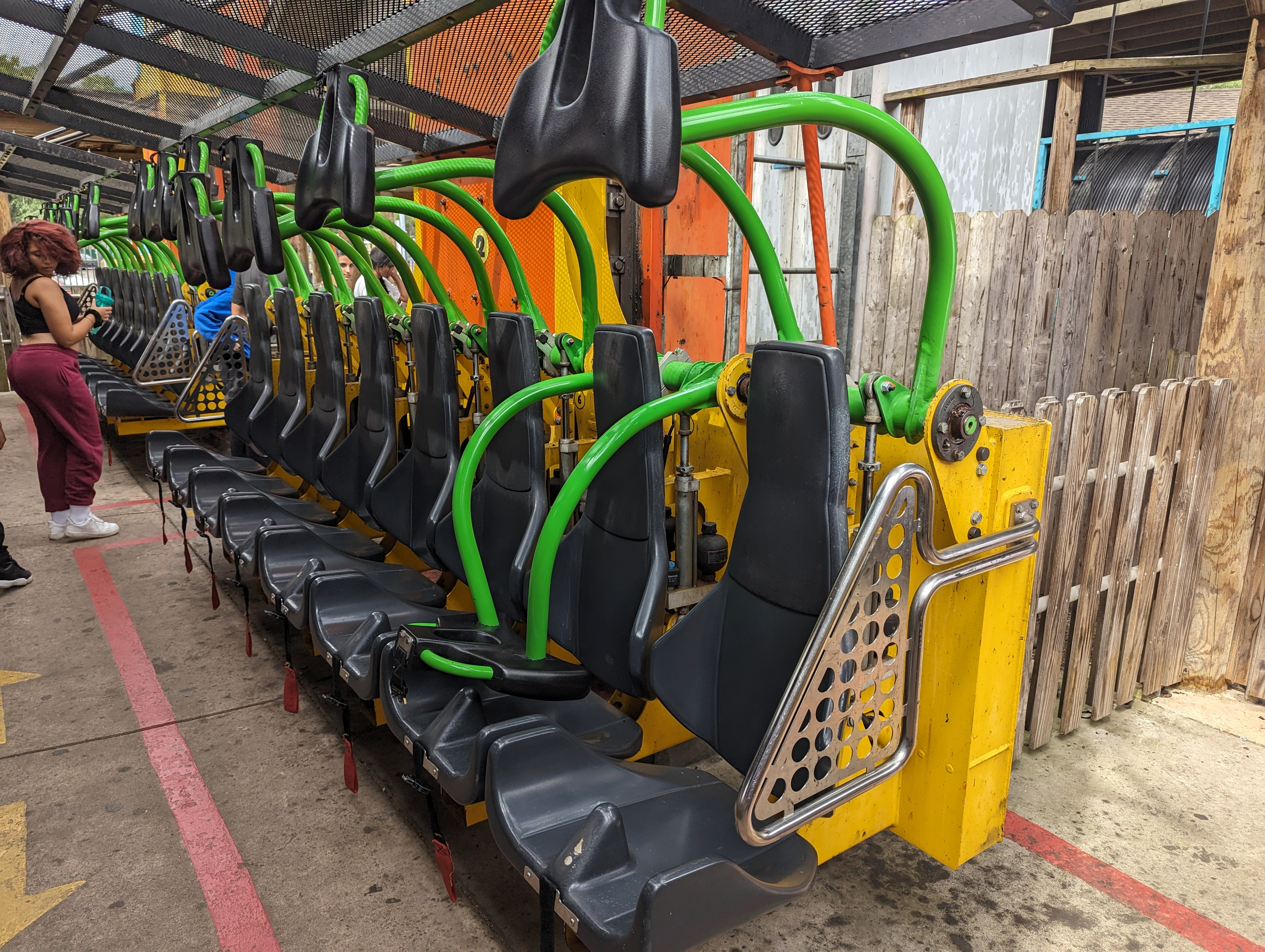
Zumanjaro's ride vehicles

Zumanjaro: Drop of Doom consisted of three free-fall drop attractions, each mounted to a lateral flank of the Kingda Ka structure. Each of the three towers featured a single floorless gondola seating eight abreast. Before riding, riders waited in a line queue along a new African baboon habitat. Upon boarding, riders were secured by over-the-shoulder restraints. Catch cars hoisted the gondolas up the tower to a height of 415 feet (126 m). The gondolas were then released into a free-fall descent, attaining a maximum velocity of 90 mph (140 km/h) over the course of six seconds. On clear days, riders were able to see Philadelphia, which is 52 miles (84 km) away from the park, according to a Six Flags spokeswoman.

== Statistics ==
- 415 ft (126 m) tall
- 90 mph (140 km/h)
- Ascends in 30 seconds
- Drops in 10 seconds
- Decelerates at 3.5g
- Three towers built on Kingda Ka
- Eight-person gondolas with 24 riders per cycle
- Three gondolas ascend simultaneously but drop independently
- 5,551 ft (1,692 m) of wire ropes and cables were used to build Zumanjaro, which is equal to 617 jumping ropes.
- 2,490 ft (760 m) of guide rail (track)
- 810 ft (250 m) of linear magnetic brakes
- 62,544 lb (28,369 kg) of drum/motor to lift riders to the top
- 161 different kinds of bolts and a grand total of 26,502 bolts
- The drum/winch mechanism that operates the lift cable is 17 ft (5.2 m) wide by 9 ft (2.7 m) in diameter
- Construction crews added 226,226 lb (102,614 kg) of steel structural reinforcing columns to Kingda Ka to support Zumanjaro.

== Records ==
Zumanjaro: Drop of Doom held the record for the tallest and fastest drop tower ride in the world till its closure, taking the record from Lex Luthor: Drop of Doom at Six Flags Magic Mountain on July 4, 2014.

Preceded by Lex Luthor: Drop of Doom	World's Tallest Vertical Drop Tower; July 4, 2014 – 11 November 2024	Succeeded by Lex Luthor: Drop of Doom

== See also ==
- Giant Drop, Lex Luthor: Drop of Doom, and Superman: Tower of Power, other Intamin drop towers that had been installed at Six Flags parks.
