= Do-Dodonpa =

Defunct launched roller coaster

- Previously known as Dodonpa (2001–2017)

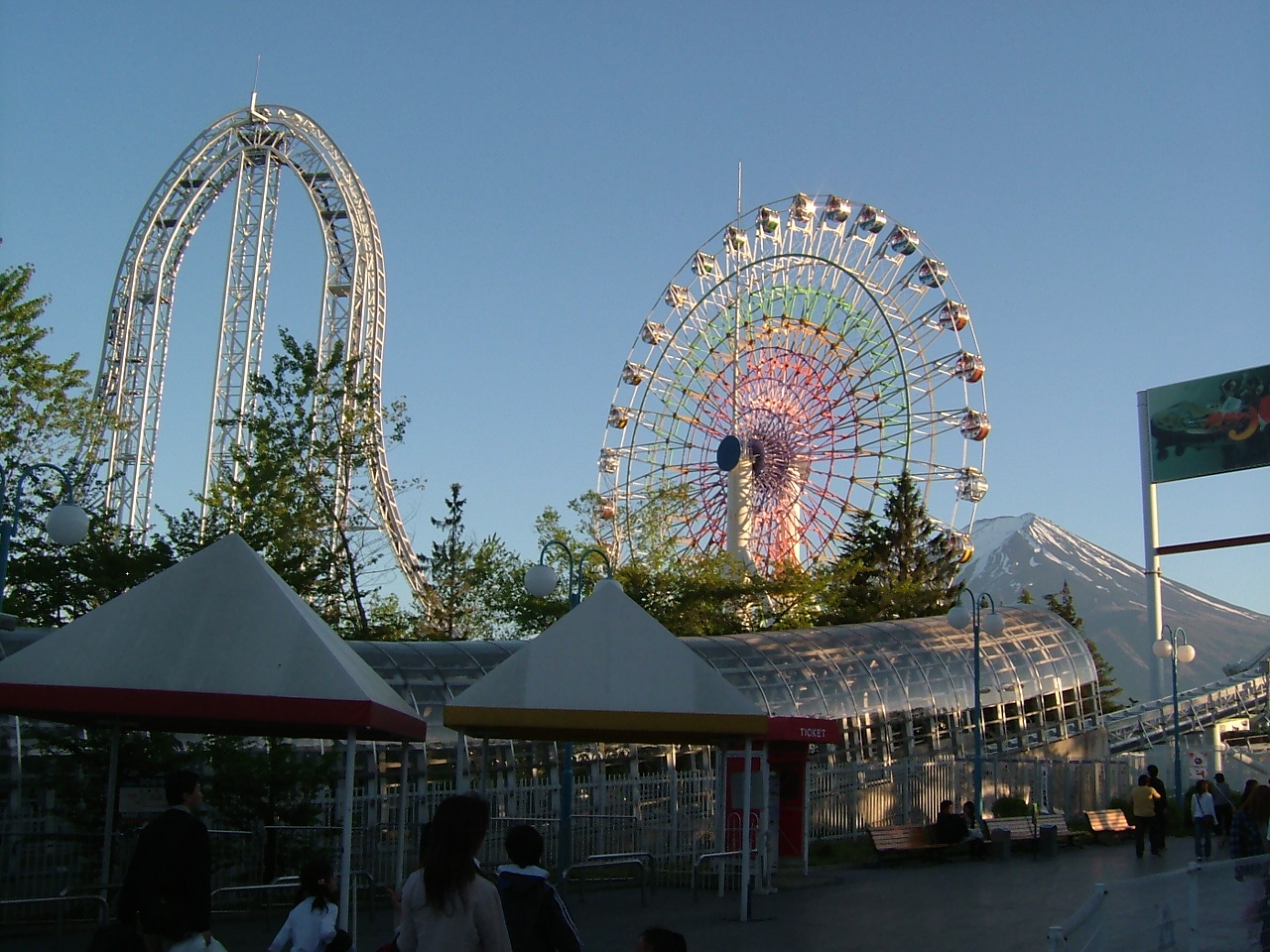
- The Dodonpa roller coaster, left, with Mount Fuji in the background. The top hat was replaced with a vertical loop in 2017.

Fuji-Q Highland
- Location: Fuji-Q Highland
- Coordinates: 35°29′15.72″N 138°46′56.13″E
- Status: Removed
- Opening date: 21 December 2001
- Closing date: 12 August 2021

General statistics
- Type: Steel
- Manufacturer: S&S – Sansei Technologies
- Model: Thrust Air Coaster
- Lift/launch system: Compressed air launch
- Height: 49 m (161 ft)
- Length: 1,244 m (4,081 ft)
- Speed: 180 km/h (110 mph)
- Inversions: 1 (2017-2021); 0 (2001-2016)
- Capacity: 80 riders per hour
- Acceleration: 0 to 180 km/h (0 to 112 mph) in 1.56 seconds
- G-force: 4.3
- Height restriction: 130 cm (4 ft 3 in)
- Trains: 4 trains with 4 cars; riders arranged 2 across in a single row for a total of 8 riders per train
- Do-Dodonpa at RCDB

Do-Dodonpa (ド･ドドンパ), formerly known as Dodonpa (ドドンパ), was a steel roller coaster located at Fuji-Q Highland in Fujiyoshida, Yamanashi, Japan. Manufactured by S&S – Sansei Technologies, the launched coaster used compressed air to propel its trains. It opened on 21 December 2001 as the fastest roller coaster in the world with the fastest acceleration, reaching a top speed of 172 km/h (106.9 mph) in 1.8 seconds. The ride was refurbished in 2017, removing its top hat element in favor of a vertical loop, as well as increasing its speed and acceleration to 180 km/h (111.8 mph) in 1.56 seconds. In 2021, the ride was closed down indefinitely after multiple complaints of riders sustaining broken bones were raised. The ride's permanent closure was officially announced on 13 March 2024.

== History ==
Dodonpa opened on 21 December 2001, and was marketed by Fuji-Q Highland as the fastest roller coaster in the world. The fastest speed record was previously held by Superman: The Escape at Six Flags Magic Mountain and Tower of Terror at Dreamworld, both of which accelerated to 160.9 km/h (100 mph) in 7 seconds. Reaching top speeds of 172 kilometres per hour (107 mph) in 1.6 seconds, Dodonpa retained this title for nearly a year and a half before Cedar Point's Top Thrill Dragster overtook it in May 2003.

Dodonpa closed in 2016 for a major renovation. The ride's top hat was removed and replaced with a 49-metre (161 ft) vertical loop, announced in a February 2017 press release from the manufacturer. Steel fabrication was provided by Intermountain Lift, Inc. Dodonpa reopened on 15 July 2017 as Do-Dodonpa. The renovated and revamped ride featured an increased acceleration and maximum speed, which changed from 0 to 172 km/h (0 to 107 mph) in 1.8 seconds to 0 to 180 km/h (0 to 112 mph) in 1.6 seconds. The track length also increased from 1,189 to 1,244 metres (3,901 to 4,081 ft). The renovation made Do-Dodonpa the world's first air-powered coaster to feature an inversion, as well as the fastest coaster in the world with an inversion.

On 13 March 2024, Fuji-Q Highland announced Do-Dodonpa's permanent closure.

== Ride experience ==
The name of the ride stems from the drumming sound that was played from the speakers in the ride's queue. This repetitive percussive music is created by taiko drums, an old traditional Japanese drum that was used to demonstrate power and influence in pre-modern Japanese villages. These drums were supposedly used in warfare to rally troops and scare off the enemy with their thundering sound.

Once passengers boarded the ride, the train moved them from the loading station to the launch pad, where it waited, allowing time for the compressed air to build up. When the ride was ready to launch, a voice in English said "Launch time!" and began a three-second countdown to launch.

After the coaster launched at 180 kilometres per hour (112 mph), it entered a wide-radius curve followed by a 49 metres (160.8 ft) vertical loop (a top hat prior to 2017). The train then entered a slight left turn before hitting a brake run. A second left turn followed by a right U-turn, both taken at slower speeds, brought the train back to the station.

The ride had a total of 4 trains with 4 cars per train. Each car sat 2 riders side-by-side, resulting in a total capacity of 8 riders per train.

== Characteristics ==
The 55 second ride took the rider across 1,244 metres (4,081 ft) of steel tracks, and peaked at a maximum height of 49 metres (161 ft). This gave the ride an acceleration at launch of 32 m/s^{2} (100 ft/s^{2}), and up to 3.3 g. By comparison, astronauts only experience 3 g at liftoff, though for a duration substantially longer than 1.6 seconds. While the ride has operated at speeds of up to 193 kilometres per hour (120 mph), its rubber tires prevented it from performing reliably at these speeds, so engineers capped the speed at 172 kilometres per hour (107 mph) prior to the ride's renovation.

Before Do-Dodonpa's initial opening, only two roller coasters reached or went beyond the 161 kilometres per hour (100 mph) barrier. As of 2026, that number stands at four currently in operation: Falcons Flight, Formula Rossa, Top Thrill 2, and Red Force.

== Incidents ==
- On 15 May 2007, a 37-year-old man sustained a minor injury when a plastic cover at the front of the train came loose and hit his right knee. The man was not badly injured because the plastic cover disconnected near the end of the ride when the train had slowed down significantly. Fuji-Q Highland stated that the cover likely came off due to cracks created over time by vibrations in the train. Further inspection of the other trains showed no similar damage.
- From December 2020 to August 2021, there were 18 injuries sustained while riding Do-Dodonpa, which included nine incidents of broken bones. Fuji-Q Highland owner Hiroaki Iwata apologized for the injuries at a press conference speech on 31 August 2021, stating that an official investigation of these incidents had been ongoing since December 2020. On 13 March 2024, the park officially announced the permanent closure of the ride.

Preceded by Steel Dragon 2000	World's Fastest Complete Circuit Roller Coaster; December 21, 2001 – May 4, 2003	Succeeded by Top Thrill Dragster
Preceded by Superman: Escape from Krypton and Tower of Terror (tied)	World's Fastest Roller Coaster; December 21, 2001 – May 4, 2003	Succeeded by Top Thrill Dragster
Preceded by Hypersonic XLC	World's Fastest Accelerating Roller Coaster; December 21, 2001 – August 12, 2021	Succeeded by Stealth
