= Superman: Escape from Krypton =

Shuttle roller coaster at Magic Mountain

- Previously known as Superman: The Escape (1997–2010)

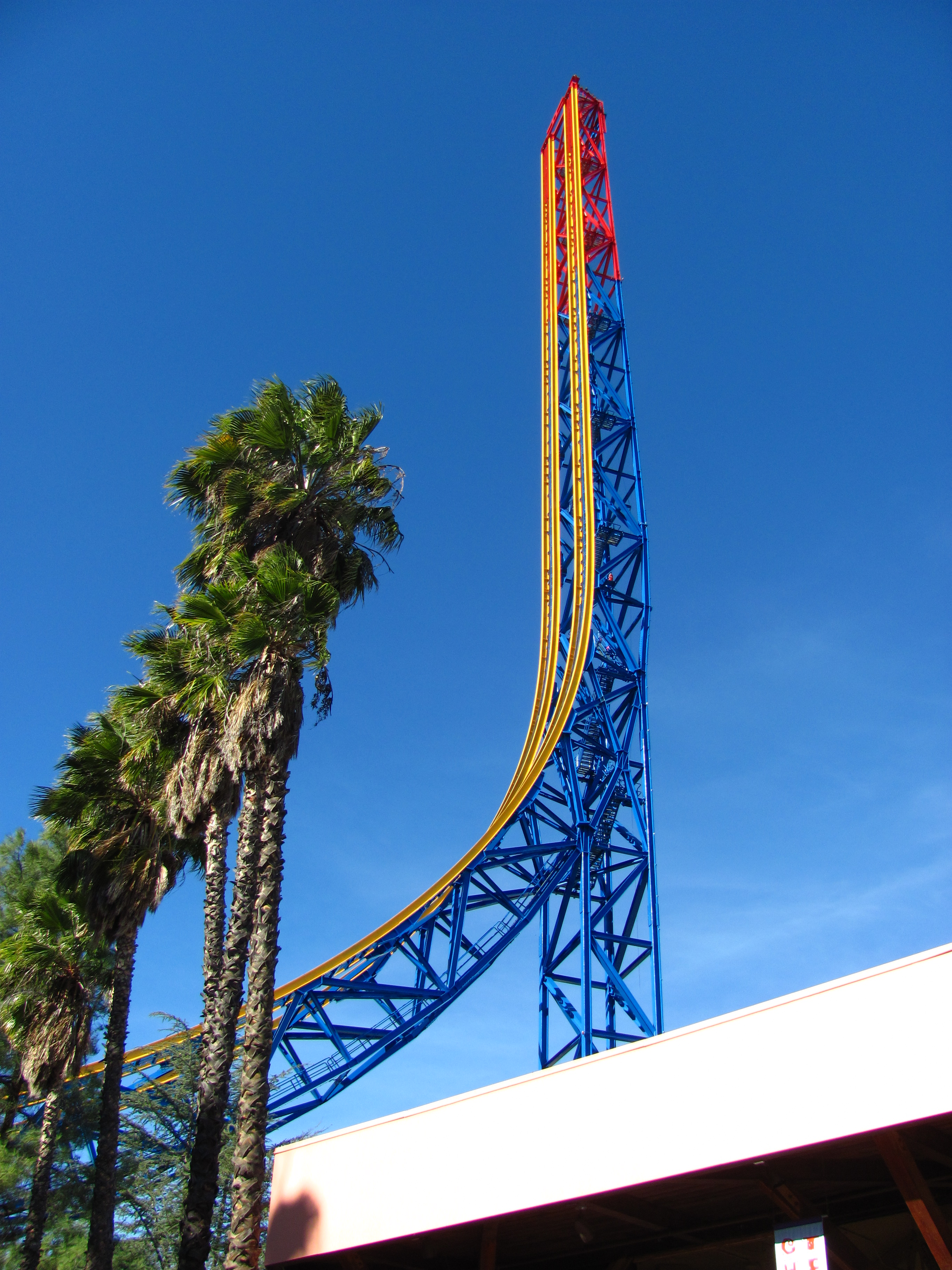
- The 415 ft (126 m) tall tower of Superman: Escape from Krypton prior to the addition of Lex Luthor: Drop of Doom

Six Flags Magic Mountain
- Location: Six Flags Magic Mountain
- Park section: Samurai Summit
- Coordinates: 34.424996°N 118.59802°W
- Status: Closed
- Opening date: March 15, 1997
- Closing date: September 2, 2024
- Cost: US$20,000,000

General statistics
- Type: Steel – Launched – Shuttle
- Manufacturer: Intamin
- Model: Reverse Freefall Coaster
- Lift/launch system: Linear synchronous motor
- Height: 415 ft (126 m)
- Drop: 328.1 ft (100.0 m)
- Length: 1,235 ft (376 m)
- Speed: 100 mph (160 km/h)
- Inversions: 0
- Duration: 0:28
- Max vertical angle: 90°
- Capacity: 1,050 riders per hour
- Acceleration: 0 to 100 mph (0 to 161 km/h) in 7 seconds
- G-force: 4.5
- Height restriction: 48 in (122 cm)
- Flash Pass was Available
- Must transfer from wheelchair
- Superman: Escape from Krypton at RCDB

Superman: Escape from Krypton, originally known as Superman: The Escape, is a decommissioned steel shuttle roller coaster located at Six Flags Magic Mountain in Valencia, California, United States. When it opened in 1997, it was the tallest roller coaster in the world, a record it held until the opening of Top Thrill Dragster in 2003. Its maximum speed of 100 mph (160 km/h) tied the world speed record held by Tower of Terror II, a similar roller coaster which opened two months earlier at Dreamworld in Australia. Both utilized linear synchronous motor (LSM) launch technology to propel their vehicles. Superman's planned opening date in 1996 was postponed due to issues with the launch system.

Superman: The Escape closed in late 2010 for refurbishment and reopened in 2011 as Superman: Escape from Krypton, featuring redesigned trains, a backward-facing ride experience, and a new color scheme. On March 28, 2025, the park confirmed the ride had permanently closed.

== History ==
=== Superman: The Escape (1997–2010) ===
During early planning, Six Flags Magic Mountain considered building a new roller coaster named Velocetron themed to The Man of Steel comic book series. Ultimately, the name Superman: The Escape was chosen, and the ride was announced on January 5, 1996. It would surpass Desperado and Phantom's Revenge to become the fastest roller coaster in the world and the first to reach 100 mph (160 km/h).

Superman: The Escape was designed by Swiss manufacturer Intamin, and construction began in late 1995. During the final stages, the last section of track was installed at the ride's highest point on May 3, 1996. Originally, the ride was scheduled to open on June 1, 1996, but it was delayed due to troubles with the launch system. In late 1996, there was a preview for season pass holders. After 10 months of testing and reengineering, the ride opened on March 15, 1997. Upon opening, it was recognized as the fastest roller coaster in the world. However, its delayed opening allowed Tower of Terror, which also reaches 100 mph (160 km/h), to open earlier at Dreamworld in Australia. Although tied with Tower of Terror as the fastest roller coaster in the world, Superman became the first to exceed 400 feet (120 m) in height and opened as the tallest roller coaster in the world.

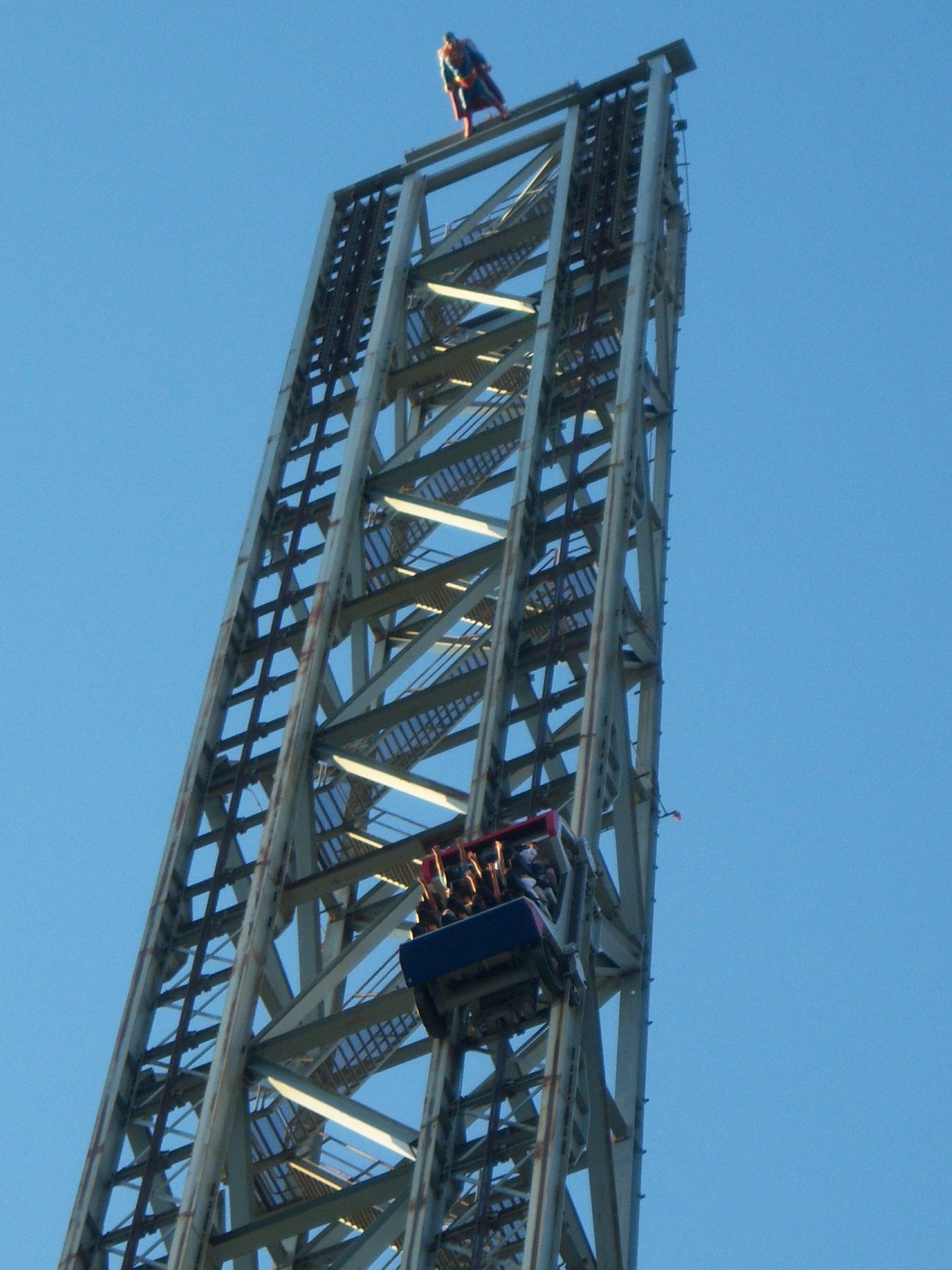
The tower when it was known as Superman: The Escape

By early 1999, the ride remained closed for maintenance. After new brake fins were installed, one side reopened in late February. On March 22, 1999, Six Flags Magic Mountain announced that Superman: The Escape was fully operating with both sides running.

In June 2004, Superman: The Escape's seat belts were modified because of an incident on the Superman – Ride of Steel roller coaster at Six Flags New England. California State Regulators asked the park to make modifications to the rides' restraint systems to prevent a similar incident in the future.

Just after July 4 weekend of 2010, Superman: The Escape ceased operations with no reason given. A sign posted in front of the ride indicated that it would not reopen until the 2011 season, with hints that there would be improvements made to the ride experience. After Superman: The Escape's sister ride, the Tower of Terror II at Dreamworld, underwent a major refurbishment in 2010 which entailed a new vehicle that launched backward, speculation turned to the possibility of a similar modification to the Magic Mountain ride. Six Flags Magic Mountain officials quickly denied rumors that it would receive a Bizarro re-theming, similar to roller coasters at other Six Flags parks.

=== Superman: Escape from Krypton (2011–2024) ===
On October 20, 2010, Six Flags Magic Mountain officially announced the refurbishment and re-theming of Superman: The Escape, in addition to the construction of two new roller coasters. As part of the refurbishment, the ride was renamed to Superman: Escape from Krypton and featured new backward launching cars and a new color scheme. The upgraded ride reopened to the public on March 19, 2011.

Superman: Escape from Krypton closed again on February 5, 2012 (almost a year after the refurbishment), to prepare for the new 2012 attraction Lex Luthor: Drop of Doom. Two drop towers, also built by Intamin, were integrated into the existing sides of Superman: Escape from Krypton's structure. The ride reopened when construction was finished on July 7, 2012.

To enable the construction of the Full Throttle roller coaster, Superman: Escape from Krypton was temporarily closed from December 2012. It reopened in mid-January 2013, with Six Flags Magic Mountain stating the ride might have intermittent closures as the construction of Full Throttle continued.

In September 2024, the ride closed for another reported refurbishment. On March 28, 2025, Six Flags Magic Mountain Park President Jeff Harris confirmed to the Orange County Register that the decision had been made to permanently close the ride as components were obsolete and spare parts were difficult to come by. The tower will remain standing in the park and Lex Luthor: Drop of Doom will continue to operate.

== Ride experience ==
=== Queue and station ===
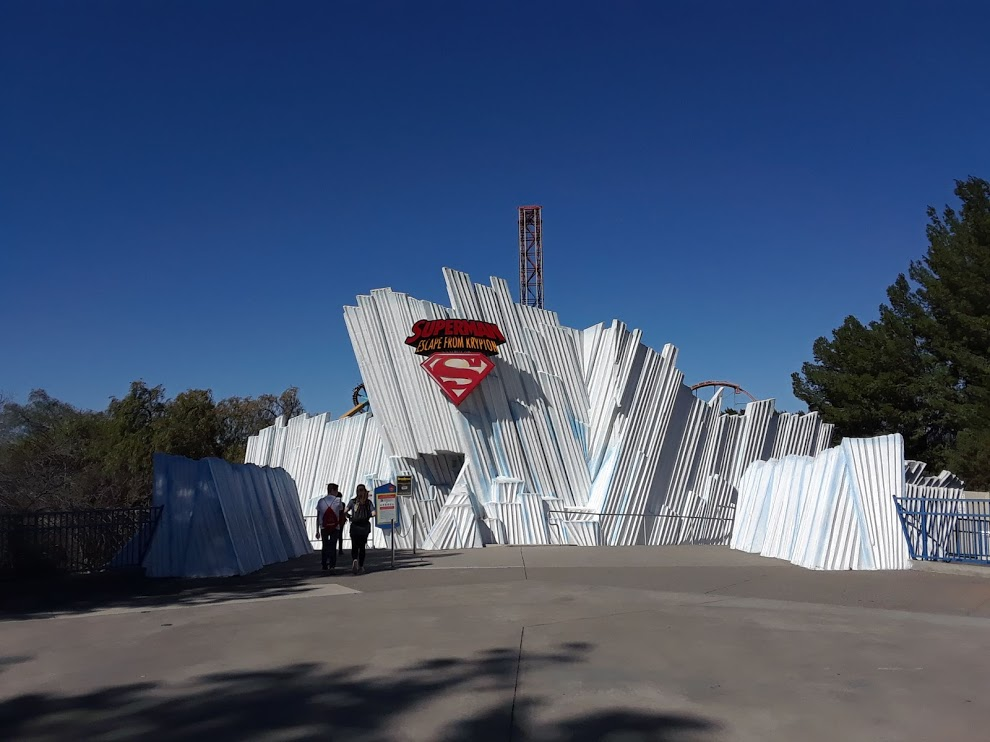
Superman Escape From Krypton Queue

At the entrance to the ride, the Superman "S" shield was imprinted and now painted onto the ground. The entrance area and queue were modeled after the Fortress of Solitude, Superman's headquarters. The queue line winded through the building and forks, gave guests the option to wait in line for either the left or right side. During slow days and in the off-season, there may be only one side operating. The fork was followed by a long tunnel down each side of the fortress, which is often kept cold from the air-conditioning. Guests then headed into the waiting area, where they were separated into four rows and boarded after the doors open. The station was lit green, modeled as Krypton, the planet that was full of Kryptonite rock that can take away Superman's powers. Inside was a crystalline-looking environment which recreated Superman's fortress in the Arctic. If the Velocetron name had been chosen, the queue and station would have had ancient ruins and a giant laser. A page on display in the SBNO (Standing but not operating) Sky Tower, the park's observation tower, shows the concept art for Velocetron.

=== Layout ===
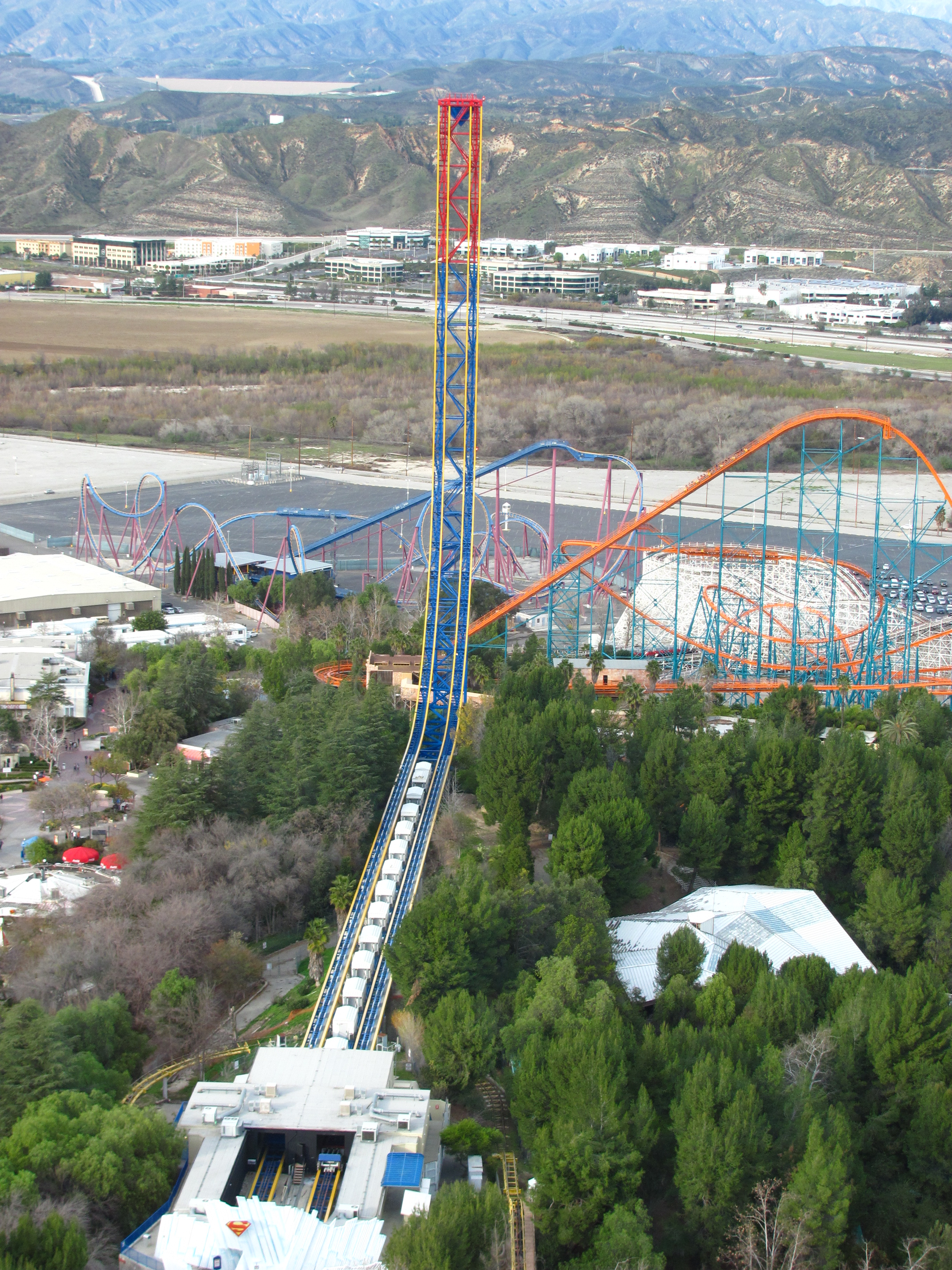
Superman: Escape from Krypton as viewed from the Sky Tower.

The roller coaster had two identical parallel tracks. The car was accelerated from the station by linear synchronous motors in forward or reverse (depending on the side riders choose) from 0 to 100 miles per hour (160 km/h) in approximately 7 seconds. Riders experienced a g-force of 4.5 during the launch. The vehicle then climbed the 415 foot (126m) tower at a 90-degree angle with riders facing straight up or down, coming to a brief pause, then reversing direction to descend the tower. During the vertical section of the ride, riders experienced weightlessness for about 6.5 seconds. The vehicle dropped back down the tower, gradually slowing down before re-entering the station.

=== Vehicles ===
The roller coaster originally featured two vehicles, each with three rows of four seats and one row of three seats for a total of 15 riders per vehicle. The original vehicles only launched forward. After the ride was refurbished in 2010, brand new "streamlined" vehicles with the Superman logo were introduced. The new vehicles were designed with low-profile sides to enhance the open-air feeling. Although they were wider, the original row of three seats was reduced to two, lowering the total number of riders to 14. Both of the new trains were capable of being launched forward or in reverse. In late August 2021, the left track vehicle was oriented to launch forward while the right track remained in the reverse vehicle orientation, allowing riders to choose if they wanted to experience a forward or reversed launch. This was the first time riders could choose between two different ride experiences. The vehicles utilized somewhat unconventional wheel assemblies due to the design of the track. The original trains featured extremely large running wheels along with up-stop wheels on the main rails, but lacked traditional side friction wheels, instead utilized a thin steel rail running along the center of the track to keep the cars centered. After the vehicle redesign, the wheel assemblies were drastically reduced in size, yet retained the central rail system for keeping the cars centered.

=== Track ===
The steel track was approximately 1,235 feet (376 m) in length and the height of the tower was approximately 415 feet (126 m). The structure was "L" shaped with two identical parallel tracks formed from steel I beams. The materials and design of the track produced an extremely loud roar which could be heard around the park while the ride was operating. When the ride originally opened it was painted in a white color scheme. After the first refurbishment, the top third of the tower structure was painted red, the rest of the structure blue, and the track rails yellow.

== Records ==
When it opened, Superman: Escape from Krypton was tied with Tower of Terror II as the fastest roller coaster in the world. The shared record stood for four years until Dodonpa opened in Japan in 2001, featuring a maximum speed of 106.9 mph (172.0 km/h). Superman: Escape from Krypton was also the tallest roller coaster in the world with the longest drop until the 420-foot-tall (130 m) Top Thrill Dragster opened at Cedar Point in 2003. The ride remained ranked in three major categories among steel coasters.

=== List of world records ===
- Tallest steel coaster at 415 feet (126 m)
- Third longest drop on a steel coaster at 328.1 feet (100.0 m)
- Fourth fastest steel coaster at 100 mph (160 km/h)

Preceded by Tower of Terror	World's Tallest Roller Coaster; March 1997 – May 2003	Succeeded by Top Thrill Dragster
Preceded by Fujiyama	World's Fastest Roller Coaster; Tied with Tower of Terror; March 1997 – December 2001	Succeeded by Dodonpa
