= Drop tower =

Type of amusement ride

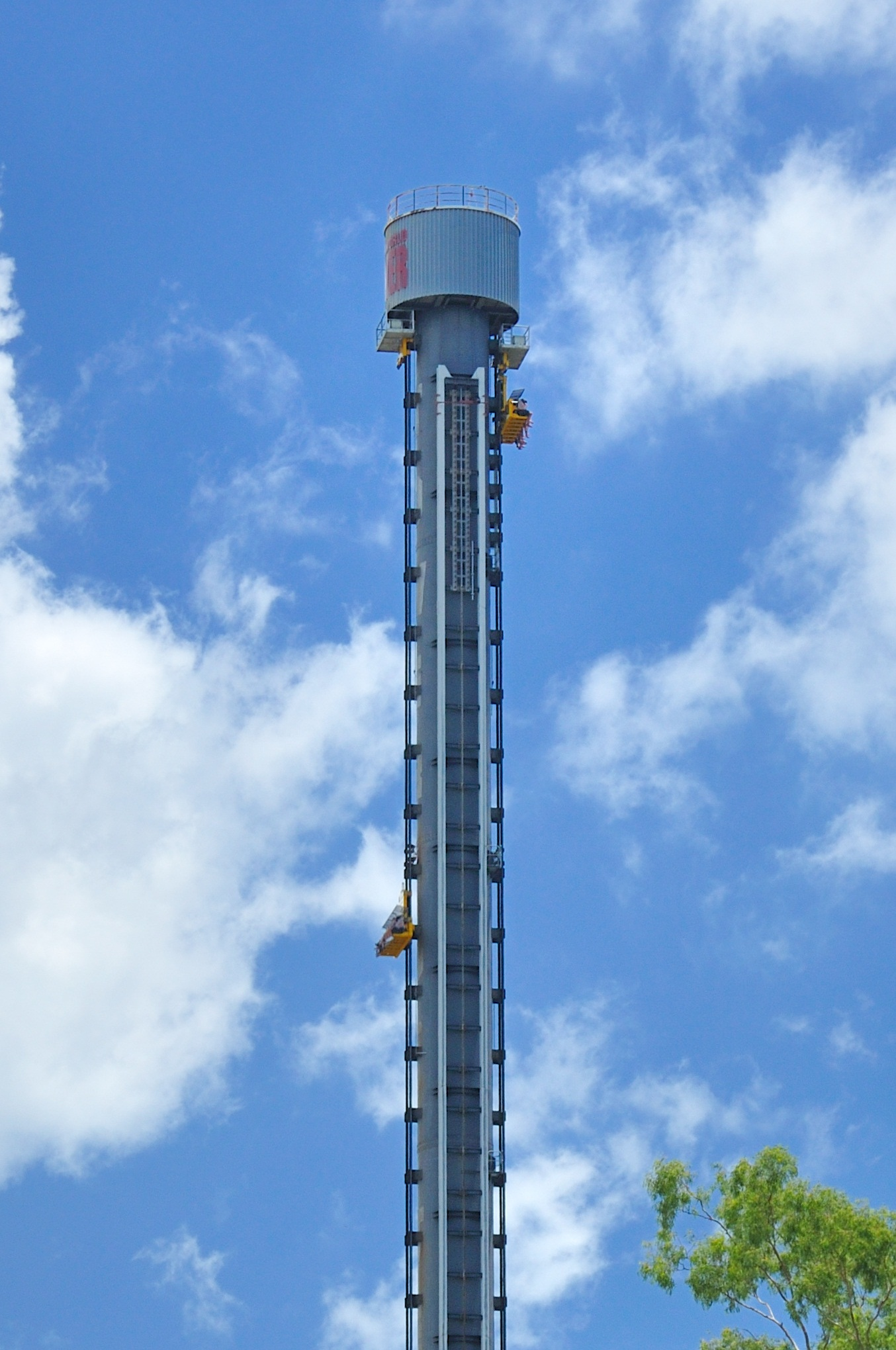
The Giant Drop at Dreamworld

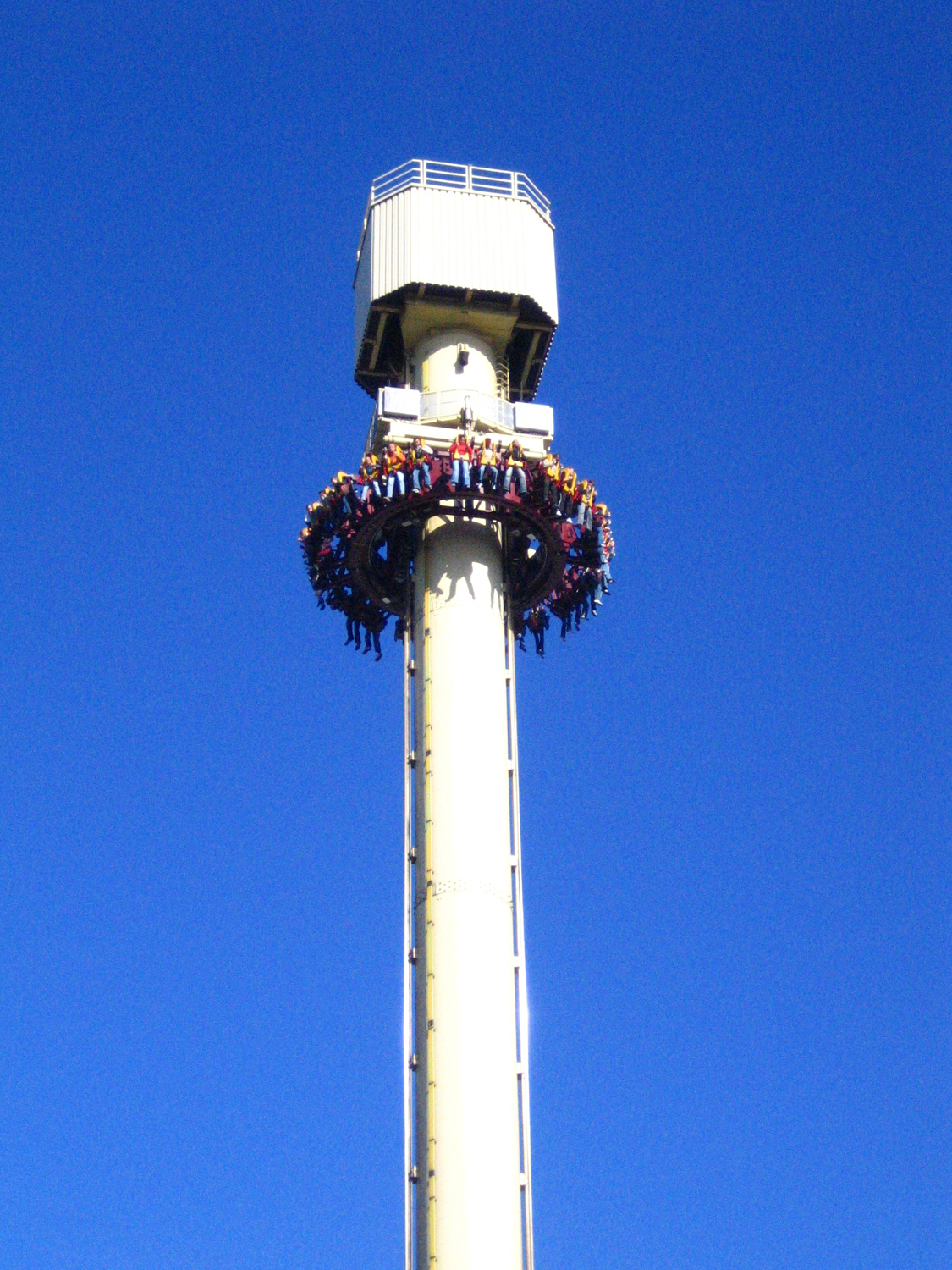
The High Fall at Movie Park Germany

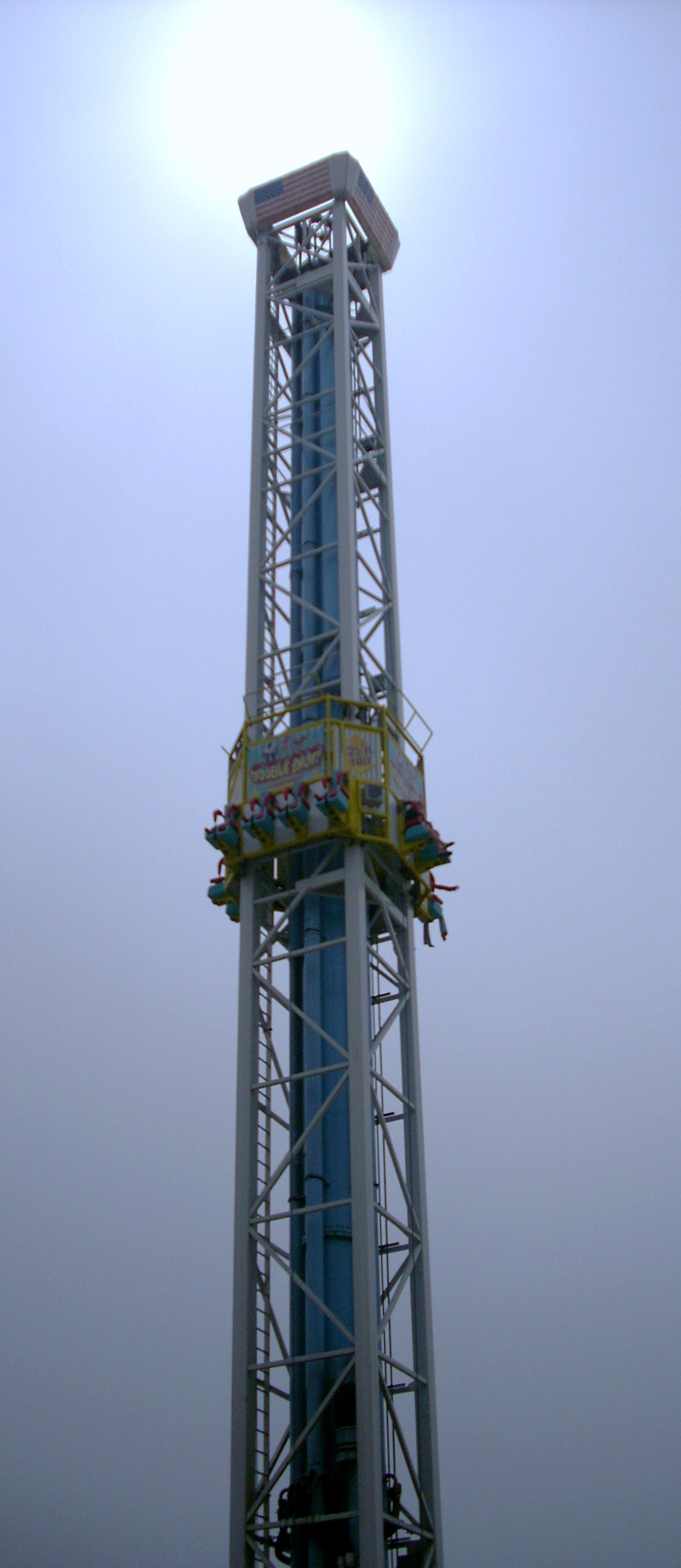
A drop tower at the Santa Cruz Beach Boardwalk entitled the "Double Shot"

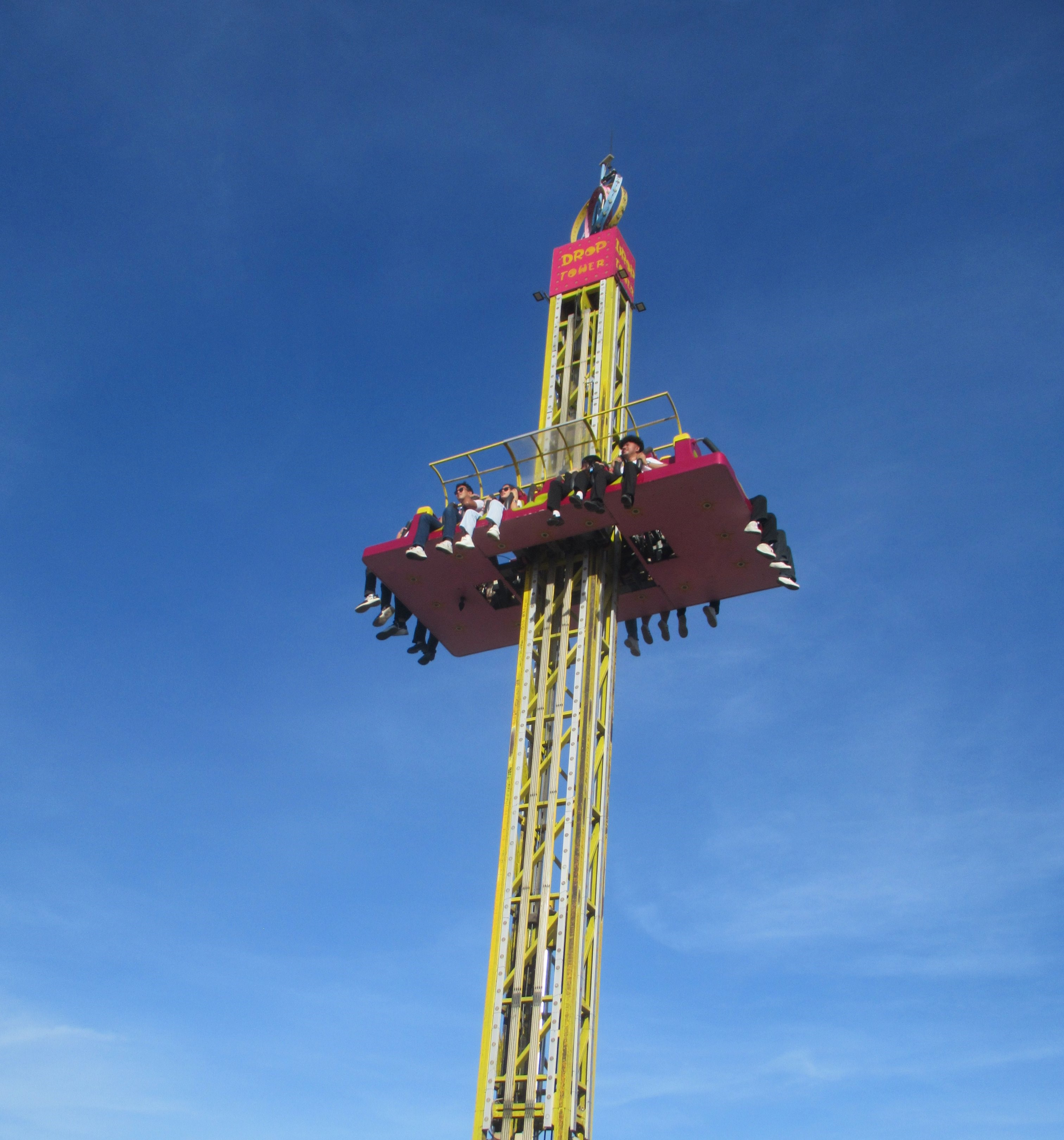
Sky Ranch Philippines

A drop tower is a type of amusement park ride incorporating a central tower structure with one or more gondolas attached. In a typical modern configuration, each gondola carrying riders is lifted to the top of the tower and then released to free fall back down to ground level. This produces a feeling of weightlessness followed by rapid deceleration. A magnetic braking system, or a variation that relies on pistons and air pressure, is used to safely bring the gondola to a complete stop. One of the earliest drop towers configured as an amusement ride was a parachute ride that debuted at the 1939 New York World's Fair, which was inspired by paratrooper training devices used by the Soviet Union in the 1920s.

Swiss manufacturer Intamin renewed interest decades later when it pioneered the modern drop tower with an early iteration released in the 1980s, which was later refined to use magnetic braking systems in the 1990s. This led to larger models, such as the Giant Drop and Gyro Drop. S&S Sansei modified the concept and released their own variation that employs pneumatics, which involves pistons, air pressure, and steel cables to control the speed of the gondola at all times. This variation can move the gondola at speeds faster than free fall and can alternatively be configured to accelerate gondolas in the opposite direction, moving at fast speeds up the tower as well as down.

Drop towers can vary in height and capacity, and some models are either mass-produced or custom. Newer features include gondolas that rotate along the vertical plane, tilting riders so they are facing the ground prior to the gondola's release. Falcon's Fury at Busch Gardens Tampa Bay, for example, is a 335-foot (102 m) tower that rotates riders to face the ground, and then returns riders to an upright position as the gondola nears the end of the drop.

== Drop tower designs ==
Mass-produced tower rides include:

- Double shot (air-powered blast up twice)
- Space shot (air-powered blast up)
- Super shot (drop down ride slowed by magnetic or air-power)
- Turbo drop (drop down ride slowed by air-power)

== Tallest drop towers ==
bold	Denotes drop tower is or was once the tallest in the world
italic	Denotes drop tower is either no longer operating or removed

Rank	Name	Park	Location	Drop height	Structural height	Manufacturer	Record holder
1	Sirocco Tower	Six Flags Qiddiya City	Qiddiya City, Riyadh Province, Saudi Arabia	140 metres (450 ft)	145 metres (475 ft)	S&S – Sansei Technologies	December 2025–Present
—	Zumanjaro: Drop of Doom	Six Flags Great Adventure	Jackson Township, New Jersey, United States	126 metres (415 ft)	139 metres (456 ft)	Intamin	July 2014 – November 2024
—	Orlando FreeFall	Icon Park	Orlando, Florida, United States	120 metres (400 feet)	130 metres (430 feet)	Funtime	—N/a
2	Lex Luthor: Drop of Doom	Six Flags Magic Mountain	Valencia, California, United States	120 metres (400 ft)	126 metres (415 ft)	Intamin	July 2012 – July 2014. November 2024 – December 2025
3	The Giant Drop	Dreamworld	Coomera, Queensland, Australia	119 metres (390 ft)	120 metres (390 ft)	Intamin	December 1998 – July 2012
4	Highlander	Hansa-Park	Sierksdorf, Germany	103 metres (338 ft)	120 metres (390 ft)	Funtime	—N/a
5	La Venganza del Enigma	Parque Warner Madrid	Madrid, Spain	100 metres (328 ft)	115 metres (377 ft)	S&S Worldwide	—N/a
—	Blue Fall	Sea Paradise	Yokohama, Japan	100 metres (328 ft)	107 metres (351 ft)	Intamin	—N/a
6	Donjon de l'Extrême	Nigloland	Dolancourt, France	95 metres (312 ft)	105 metres (344 ft)	Funtime	—N/a
7	Falcon's Fury	Busch Gardens Tampa Bay	Tampa Bay, Florida, United States	94 metres (310 ft)	102 metres (335 ft)	Intamin	—N/a
8	Voltrum	Bayern-Park	Reisbach, Germany	93 metres (305 ft)	109 metres (358 ft)	Funtime	—N/a
—	Sky Screamer	Marineland of Canada	Niagara Falls, Ontario, Canada	91 metres (300 ft)	140 metres (450 ft)	S&S – Sansei Technologies	—N/a
9	AtmosFear	Liseberg	Gothenburg, Sweden	90 metres (295 ft)	116 metres (381 ft)	Intamin	—N/a
10	Hurakan Condor	PortAventura Park	Salou, Spain	87 metres (285 ft)	115 metres (377 ft)	Intamin	—N/a
11	UFO Gyro Drop	Formosan Aboriginal Culture Village	Yuchr Shiang, Nantou County, Taiwan	85 metres (280 ft)	110 metres (360 ft)	Intamin	—N/a
12	Global Burj	Global Village	Dubai, United Arab Emirates	85 metres (279 ft)	Unknown	Unknown	—N/a
13	Drop Tower	Kings Dominion	Doswell, Virginia, United States	83 metres (272 ft)	93 metres (305 ft)	Intamin	—N/a
14	Big Tower	Beto Carrero World	Penha, Santa Catarina, Brazil	80 metres (264 ft)	100 metres (328 ft)	Intamin	—N/a
15	Drop Tower	Kings Island	Mason, Ohio, United States	80 metres (264 ft)	96 metres (315 ft)	Intamin	—N/a
15	The Plunge	Kongeparken	Ålgård, Rogaland, Norway	80 metres (264 ft)	Unknown	Funtime	—N/a

=== Other notable examples ===
- Big Shot on the top of The Strat reaching 329 metres (1,081 ft) was the highest situated drop tower ride in the world, with a drop of 49 metres (160 ft) to a base 281 metres (921 ft) above ground level
- Space Probe located at Wonderland Sydney in Australia
- Apocalypse at Drayton Manor in England
- Detonator at Thorpe Park in England
- Launch Pad at Pleasure Beach Blackpool in England
- AtmosFEAR at Morey's Piers, Wildwood, New Jersey
- The Twilight Zone Tower of Terror at multiple Disney parks worldwide.
- Acrophobia at Six Flags Over Georgia
- Guardians of the Galaxy - Mission: Breakout! at Disney California Adventure Park
- Giant Drop at Six Flags Great America
- Extreme Scream at Washington State Fair

== Injuries and accidents ==
- On August 22, 1999, 12-year-old Joshua Smurphat fell to his death on Drop Zone: Stunt Tower (Drop Tower) at Paramount's Great America (California's Great America) after slipping from the ride's restraints, which were still locked at the end of the ride.
- On June 21, 2007 (park operating as Six Flags Kentucky Kingdom), a 13-year-old girl from Louisville, Kentucky had both feet cut off above the ankle when one of the ride's cables snapped during operation. Following the incident, all Intamin towers were temporarily closed and the Carowinds model was found to have stretched cables.
- On February 24, 2012, 14-year-old Gabriella Yukari Nichimura died in an accident at Hopi Hari, Vinhedo, São Paulo State, Brazil. She fell from the drop tower ride "La Tour Eiffel" suffering cranial trauma and died on the way to the hospital. Initial investigations suggested the possibility of mechanical failure in the restraint latch.
- On the evening of January 3, 2018, 8 people (five females and three males aged 12 to 18, including Danica Villas) were injured suffering "cervical spasms" after Fun Drop Tower Ride at the amusement park Circle of Fun in Quezon Memorial Circle suddenly dropped.
- On the evening of September 5, 2021, 6-year-old Wongel Estifanos died on the Haunted Mine Drop ride after being separated from her seat and falling 110 ft (34 m) to her death. It has been determined that the girl was actually sitting on top of her seatbelt rather than the seatbelt being tight on her lap. A forensic pathologist identified the cause of death as blunt-force trauma. The official report by the Colorado Division of Oil and Public Safety blamed a lack of procedures and inadequate training of two ride operators to ensure that Estifanos was properly buckled in. Before the accident, the ride had had four annual safety inspections per Colorado Amusement Rides and Devices Regulations (7 CCR 1101-12) and was certified to have corrected any issues. Following the incident the park temporarily closed. Colorado Senate Bill 03-253 allows parents to release their minor’s rights to sue for negligence.
- On the evening of March 24, 2022, 14-year-old Tyre Sampson from Missouri fell to his death from the world's tallest drop tower ride, the Orlando FreeFall drop tower at ICON Park in Florida. The brand new attraction had been open for only three months at the time of the accident. On April 18, 2022, it was discovered that the safety sensors of two seats had been intentionally modified to allow for larger gaps between harness and seat, almost double the normal range, presumably to accommodate larger riders, a condition that ultimately led to Tyre's death, since he slipped through that gap and fell toward the end of the drop when the ride slowed down. On October 6, 2022, it was announced that the Orlando Free Fall tower would be dismantled. The owner planned to have the demolition finished by the anniversary of the victim’s death.
- On September 5, 2022, a drop tower in India failed to slow down, causing it to fall 50 feet to the ground, injuring 16 people.

== See also ==
- Media related to Drop towers at Wikimedia Commons
- Freefall
- List of amusement rides
