= The Giant Drop =

Amusement ride at Dreamworld Australia

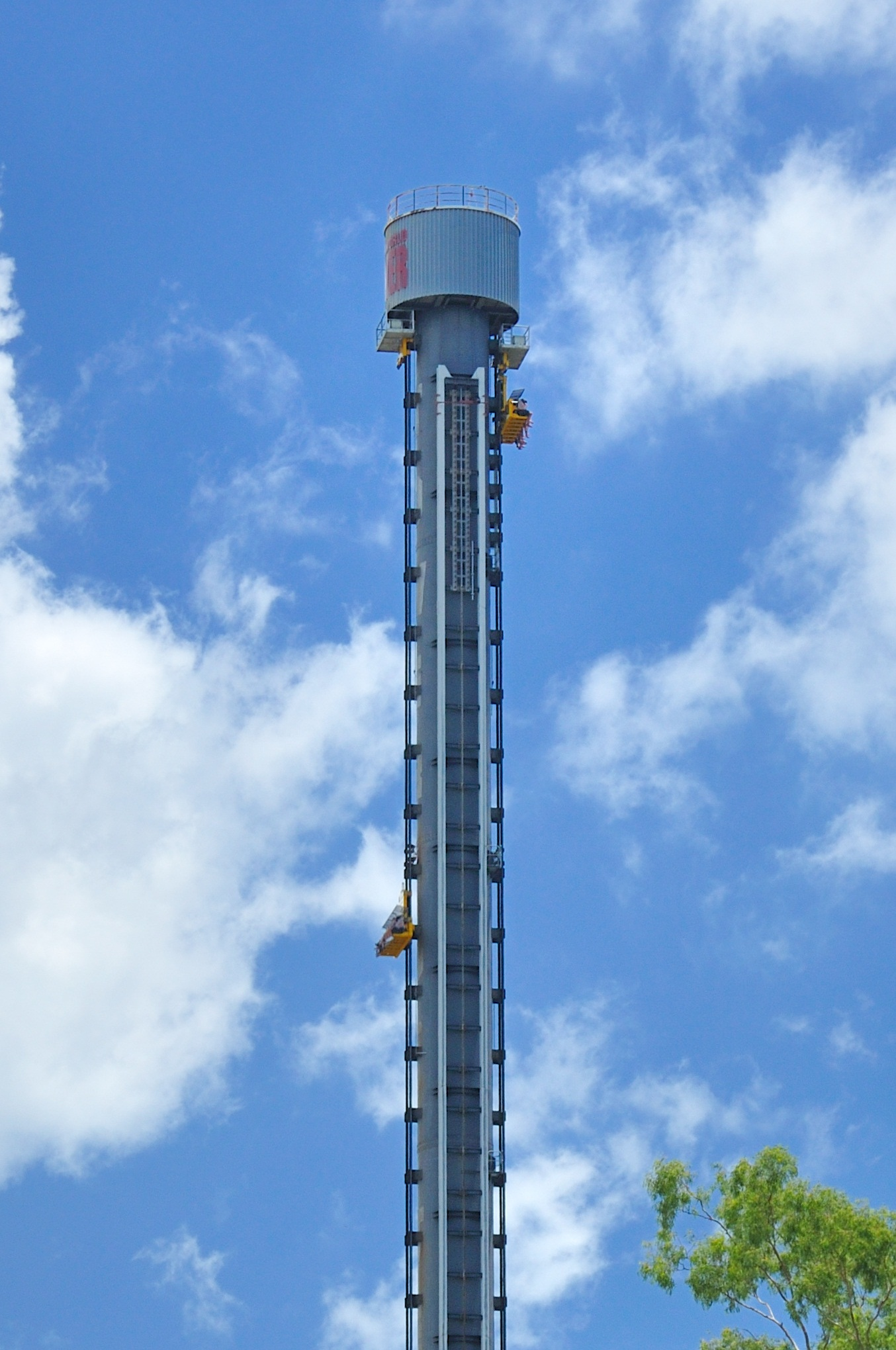
- The Dreamworld Tower

Dreamworld
- Area: Gold Rush Country
- Coordinates: 27°51′43.3″S 153°18′58.5″E
- Status: Operating
- Cost: A$12,000,000
- Soft opening date: 20 December 1998
- Opening date: 26 December 1998

Ride statistics
- Attraction type: Giant Drop
- Manufacturer: Intamin
- Theme: Oil rig
- Height: 119 m (390 ft)
- Drop: 115 m (377 ft)
- Speed: 135.0 km/h (83.9 mph)
- G-force: 3.5
- Capacity: 550 riders per hour
- Vehicles: 2
- Riders per vehicle: 8
- Duration: 100 seconds
- Height restriction: 120–195 cm (3 ft 11 in – 6 ft 5 in)
- Website: Official website
- Ride Express available

The Giant Drop is a drop tower ride located at the Dreamworld theme park on the Gold Coast, Australia. Manufactured by Intamin, the ride was added in December 1998 to the existing Dreamworld Tower which housed the Tower of Terror. For fourteen years, The Giant Drop held the record for the tallest drop tower in the world.

The Giant Drop is one of Dreamworld's seven thrill rides. It has a height of 119 metres (390 ft) and a maximum speed of 135 kilometres per hour (84 mph), making it both the fastest and tallest amusement park ride in the Southern Hemisphere.

The ride is themed to an oil rig by "The Giant Oil Company". There are many pieces of oil machinery located around the ride.

== History ==
Construction of the Dreamworld Tower began in 1996. On 23 January 1997, the Tower of Terror officially opened to the public. Close to two years later, on 26 December 1998, The Giant Drop officially opened to the public as part of the Dreamworld Tower. Additional theming was added around the base of the ride and the Vintage Car track was re-routed around the base of the tower. The cost to build The Giant Drop, had the Dreamworld Tower not been already standing, was published at A$12 million. Over 5 million people have been dropped to date.

In mid-2007, concerns were raised over the safety of Intamin drop towers after an incident at Six Flags Kentucky Kingdom's Superman: Tower of Power ride where a teenage girl had her feet severed after a cable had snapped. Despite the incident, Dreamworld continued to keep The Giant Drop operating, stating their ride's cables had daily and monthly checks. An independent safety audit concluded that "Dreamworld's safety standards are world class and second to none".

On 25 April 2022, The Giant Drop closed for a refurbishment which includes the installation of lighting, a repaint and continued removal of the track from the former Tower of Terror II ride, which closed in November 2019. The ride reopened on 24 June 2023.

== Characteristics ==
The Giant Drop is one of Dreamworld's seven thrill rides alongside The Claw, The Gold Coaster, Mick Doohan's Motocoaster, Pandamonium, Steel Taipan and Tail Spin. The ride reaches a maximum speed of 135 kilometres per hour (84 mph) and has a height of 119 metres (390 ft).

The Giant Drop consists of a pair of vertical tracks which attach to the flank of the Dreamworld Tower. Each track features one, eight-seat floorless gondola in which riders are harnessed in by over-the-shoulder restraints.

== Ride ==
=== Queue ===
Guests are to either access the entrance to the ride via a wooden staircase or a ramp. Guests then queue in an undercover oil themed outdoor queue before entering the indoor queue. Upon entry to the outdoor queue, a safety notice and a Guinness World Record plaque are located at the main entrance. Guests then enter the indoor queue. The indoor queue is themed to an oil rig's control centre. The queue previously featured interactive features.

=== Ride ===
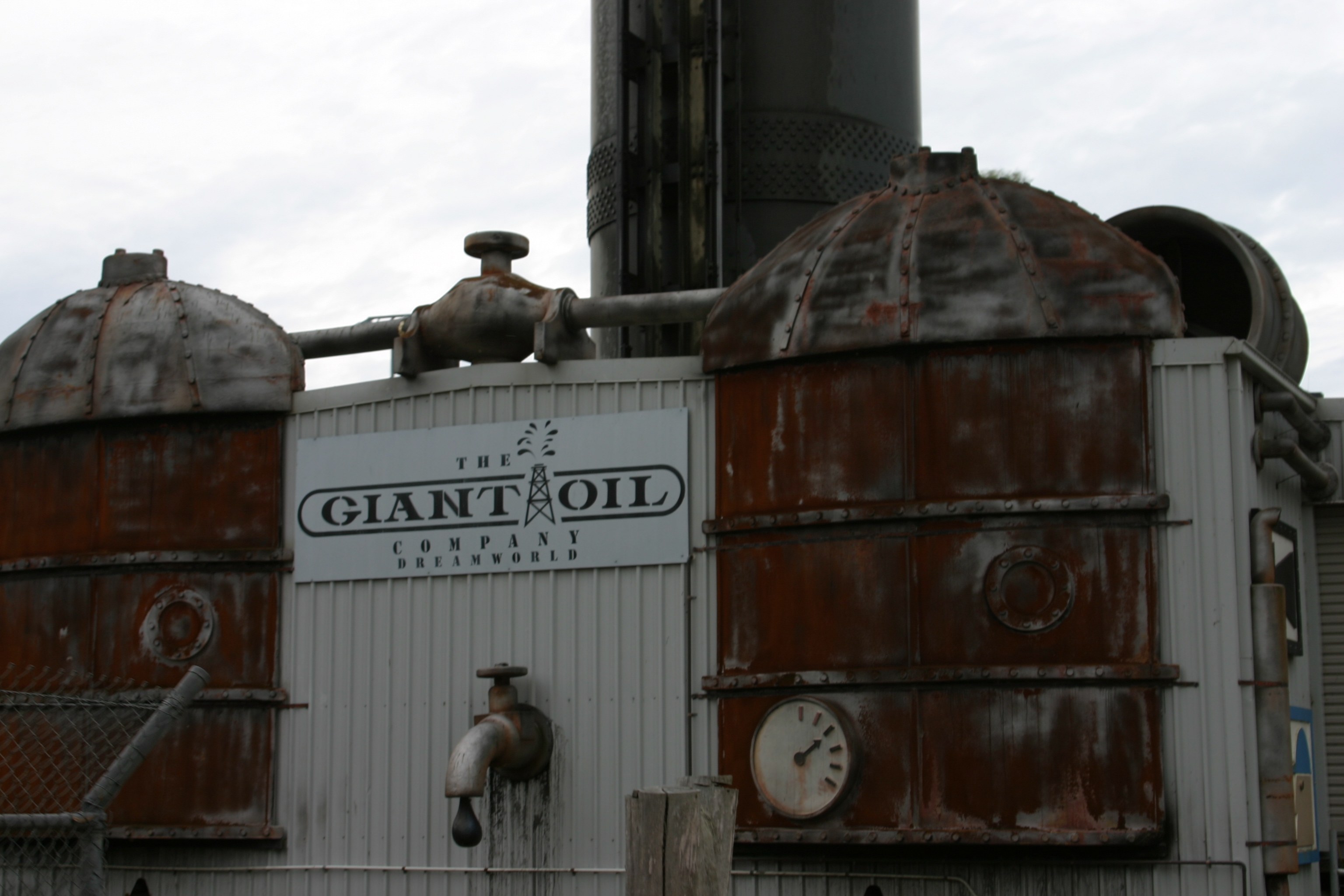
The Giant Drop is themed to an oil rig at The Giant Oil Company.

Catch cars lift the gondolas for a duration of approximately 90 seconds to a dynamic height of 119 metres (390 ft). Upon reaching the top of the tower, the gondolas are released into a free-fall, attaining a terminal velocity of 135 kilometres per hour (84 mph) before stopped by permanently mounted rare-earth magnets. At this moment, the on-ride photo is taken.

Upon opening, the eastern side of The Giant Drop featured a momentary pause shortly after the release from the top. This feature (which has been discontinued) demonstrated the fail-safe magnetic brakes.

== Television ==
The Giant Drop has been featured on Australian Guinness World Records television show. It was also featured on the 2009, American, Travel Channel documentary "Extreme Terror Rides". In 2010 season of The Amazing Race Asia, teams were required to ride The Giant Drop and photograph Kenny Koala, the park's mascot, waving the race flag once they've reached the top.

From 2003 and 2004, the ride was depicted at the start of the title sequence for the reality show Big Brother Australia, as the production was filmed at Dreamworld from 2001 to 2008 and 2012 to 2014.

== Records ==
At the time of opening, in December 1998, The Giant Drop gained the Guinness World Record title of the "World's Tallest Vertical Drop Ride". The Giant Drop conceded the title on 7 July 2012, when Lex Luthor: Drop of Doom opened at Six Flags Magic Mountain located in California.

Preceded by Supreme Scream	World's Tallest Vertical Drop Fun Ride; 20 December 1998–6 July 2012	Succeeded by Lex Luthor: Drop of Doom

== See also ==
- Dreamworld Tower
- Tower of Terror II
