= The Flash: Vertical Velocity =

The Flash: Vertical Velocity are three roller coasters located at Six Flags amusement parks:

- The Flash: Vertical Velocity located at Six Flags Great America in Gurnee, Illinois.
- The Flash: Vertical Velocity located at Six Flags Discovery Kingdom in Vallejo, California.
- The Flash: Vertical Velocity located at Six Flags Great Adventure in Jackson Township, New Jersey.
