= Vertical velocity =

Vertical velocity can refer to:

- The Flash: Vertical Velocity (Six Flags Great Adventure), a roller coaster set to open in 2025 at Six Flags Great Adventure
- The Flash: Vertical Velocity (Six Flags Great America), a roller coaster located at Six Flags Great America
- The Flash: Vertical Velocity (Six Flags Discovery Kingdom), a roller coaster located at Six Flags Discovery Kingdom
- As a common noun, the term also refers to the movement of air masses upward as related in the omega equation.
- Vertical speed
