= Maxx Force =

Roller coaster at Six Flags Great America

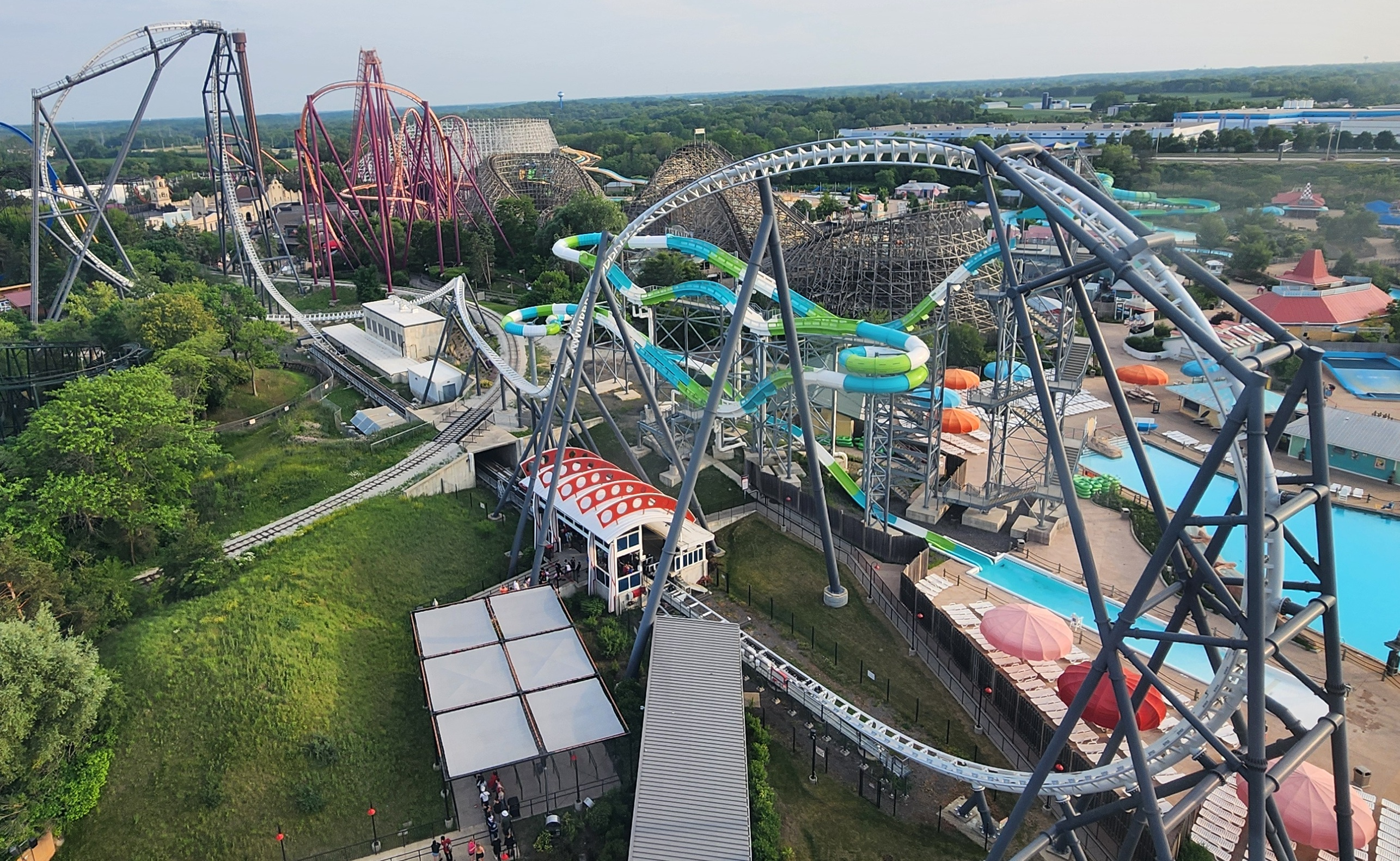
- An overview of Maxx Force's layout in 2025

Six Flags Great America
- Location: Six Flags Great America
- Park section: Carousel Plaza
- Coordinates: 42.368858°N 87.936473°W
- Status: Operating
- Soft opening date: July 2, 2019
- Opening date: July 4, 2019
- Cost: $15 million
- Replaced: Pictorium

General statistics
- Type: Steel – Launched
- Manufacturer: S&S – Sansei Technologies
- Designer: Joe Draves
- Model: Compressed Air Launch
- Height: 175 ft (53 m)
- Length: 1,800 ft (550 m)
- Speed: 78 mph (126 km/h)
- Inversions: 4 or 5 (Note: The Roller Coaster DataBase lists the ride as having four inversions, since the Maxx Dive Loop is counted as one inversion. Other sources list the ride as having five inversions, with the Maxx Dive Loop counted as two.)
- Duration: 0:23
- Acceleration: 0 to 78 mph (0 to 126 km/h) in 1.8 seconds
- Height restriction: 48 in (122 cm)
- Trains: 2 trains with 4 cars; riders arranged 2 across in 2 rows for a total of 16 riders per train
- Website: Official website
- Fast Lane Priority and Ultimate only available (limited-use basis)
- Maxx Force at RCDB

Video

Maxx Force is a launched steel roller coaster at Six Flags Great America in Gurnee, Illinois, United States. Manufactured by S&S – Sansei Technologies, it opened on July 4, 2019. It is themed on drag racing and is located in the park's Carousel Plaza section. It is marketed as having the quickest acceleration in North America at 0 to 78 mph (126 km/h) in 1.8 seconds and the fastest inversion in the world at 60 mph (97 km/h).

== History ==
=== Development ===
On May 4, 2018, The Pictorium, a 980-seat IMAX theater that opened in 1979 as the "world's largest cinema experience", was closed and demolished with little publicity, almost one year away from its 40th anniversary. From August 2 through August 23, 2018, Six Flags Great America released four episodes of a teaser series titled "Road to Glory" on social media. In these episodes, a racer appropriately named "Maxx" races around the park as pit crew cheer him on. On August 30, 2018, Maxx Force was officially announced along with the rest of 2019 attraction announcements by Six Flags. The ride time is approximately 23 seconds.

=== Construction and operation ===
Shortly after Maxx Force's announcement on August 30, 2018, construction began in Carousel Plaza, forcing the nearby Whizzer to temporarily close and have a section of its track removed in order to place footers for the ride. In December 2018, track pieces had already arrived at the park. Maxx Force then went vertical on January 15, 2019 shown at the American Coaster Enthusiast (ACE) event that took place January 19, 2019. On May 13, 2019, the last piece of track was placed toward the end of the ride.

On June 12, 2019, one month after the last piece of track was completed, the Maxx Force coaster train made its first complete circuit after a few weaker launches to test the air launch mechanics. A commercial filming day was held on June 30. Media Day was on July 2, 2019 followed by a passholder preview the following day. The ride officially opened to the general public on July 4, 2019.

After the 2019 season, Six Flags worked in conjunction with a village-recommended sound engineer to review the noise level generated by Maxx Force. Due to the ride's air-launch system, the noise was loud enough to be heard from the entire park and surrounding areas in Gurnee. To reduce noise complaints, the company made modifications to the launch system, such as the addition of sound barriers.

For the 2022 season, the park added a single rider line for the attraction.

Part of the way through the 2025 season, Maxx Force was temporarily shut down for "track maintenance", according to a park spokesperson. The ride reopened on September 21, 2025.

== Ride experience ==
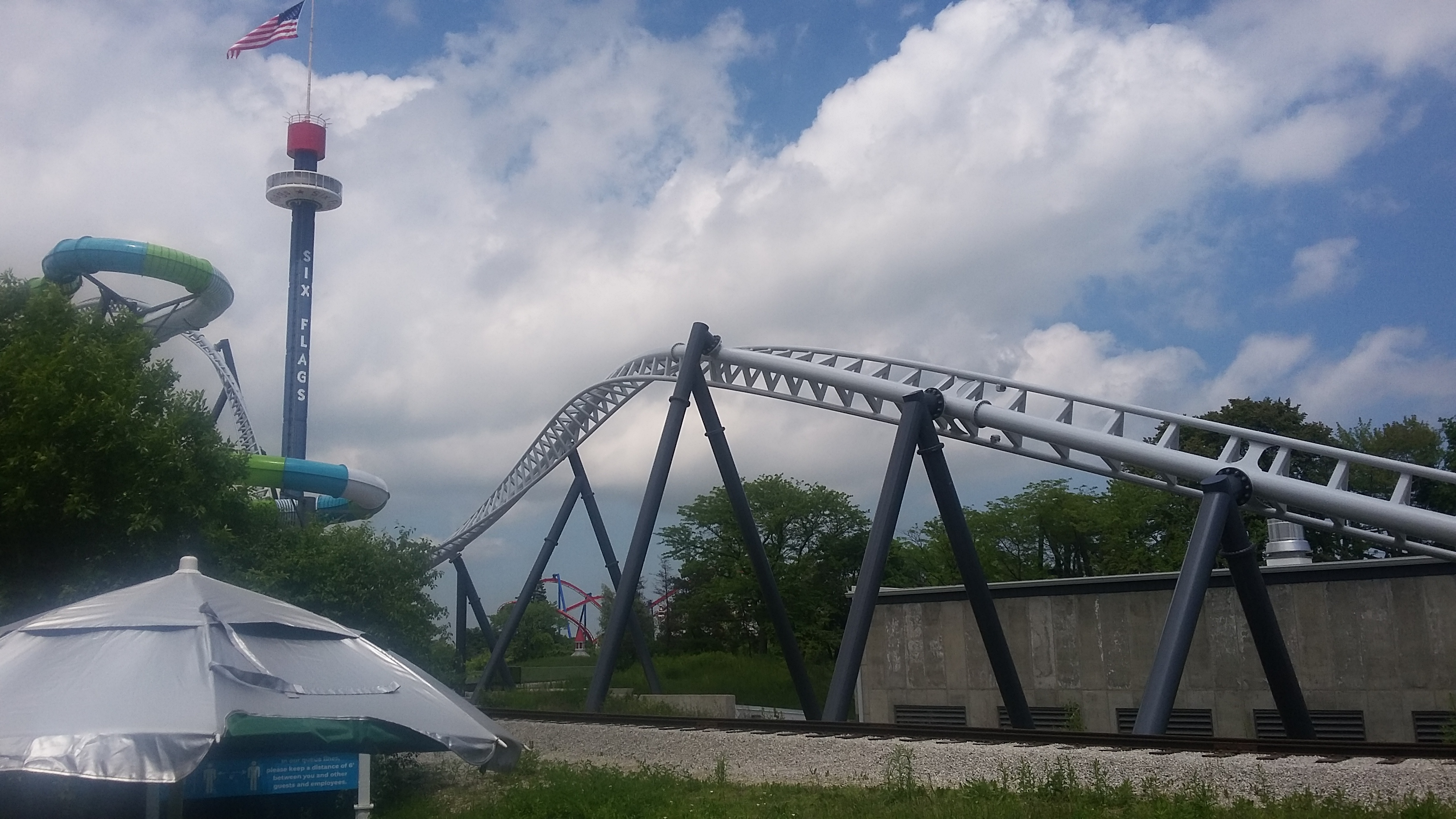
The heartline roll.

=== Seating ===
Maxx Force features Formula One themed trains where riders are seated in eight rows, each consisting of two riders, for a total of sixteen riders per train. Each seat is equipped with a lap bar and seatbelt, in addition to shin guards and a pneumatic ratcheting system to lock. The seats are constructed of fiberglass with a metal supporting frame, with a soft foam seat backing to protect the head and back during the rapid acceleration of the launch.

=== Layout ===
After leaving the station, the train pulls forward into the launch area. The catch wagon then attaches to the front of the train prior to launch. During the launch, the train accelerates from 0 to 78 mph (126 km/h) in 1.8 seconds, followed by a "dog tongue" double inversion at 175 feet (53 m) off the ground. The train slows as it reaches the top producing a moment of weightlessness as the train begins its descent. The dive is followed by a turn to the right and a heartline roll, in which riders enter at speeds up to 60 mph (97 km/h). Next, the train enters the Maxx Dive Loop, an element above the station similar to a dive loop where trains traverse an upwards three-quarters heartline roll before turning upside down in the other direction and diving toward the ground. A set of brakes are located halfway down the final element, slowing the train as it returns to the station. One cycle of the ride lasts approximately 23 seconds.

=== Theme ===
Maxx Force features a racing theme, with the train representing a Formula One car complete with styled wheels on the front. One train is red, and the other is black. The ride's entrance reuses the old Pictorium entrance, painted red and grey with the ride's logo on it. The gift shop nearby originally named Carousel Plaza Gifts that sold Great America apparel was transformed into Victory Lane which now sells Maxx Force items and Great America apparel.

== Reception ==
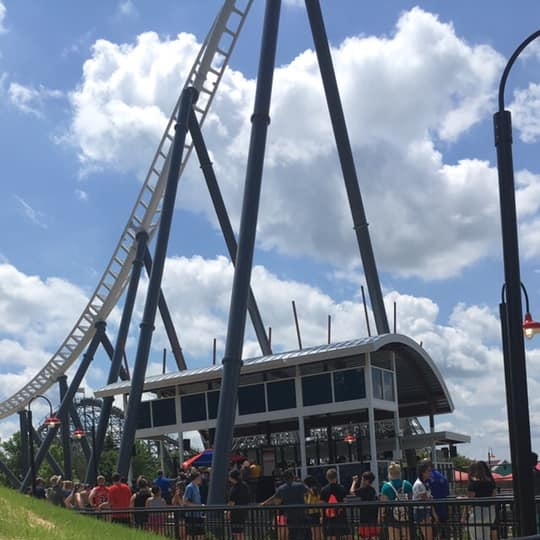
The station and the "Maxx Dive Loop" inversion

Dan Moran of the Chicago Tribune positively commented on the ride, stating that "while elements are similar to Vertical Velocity and X Flight, Maxx Force succeeds in making its own mark" and Illinois representative Joyce Mason remarked that the ride is "amazing" with a feeling of "soaring like an eagle," and compared the attraction to the roller coaster American Eagle by saying "it's so much better [...] because it's so much smoother." Marcus Leshock of WGN-TV described the roller coaster as "pure exhilaration."

== World records ==
According to Six Flags, Maxx Force held these records on opening:

- Fastest acceleration in North America (0 to 78 mph [126 km/h] in 2 secs)
- Fastest inversion in the world (60 mph [97 km/h])
- Tallest double inversion in the world (175 ft [53 m])
