= Half Pipe (roller coaster) =

Amusement ride

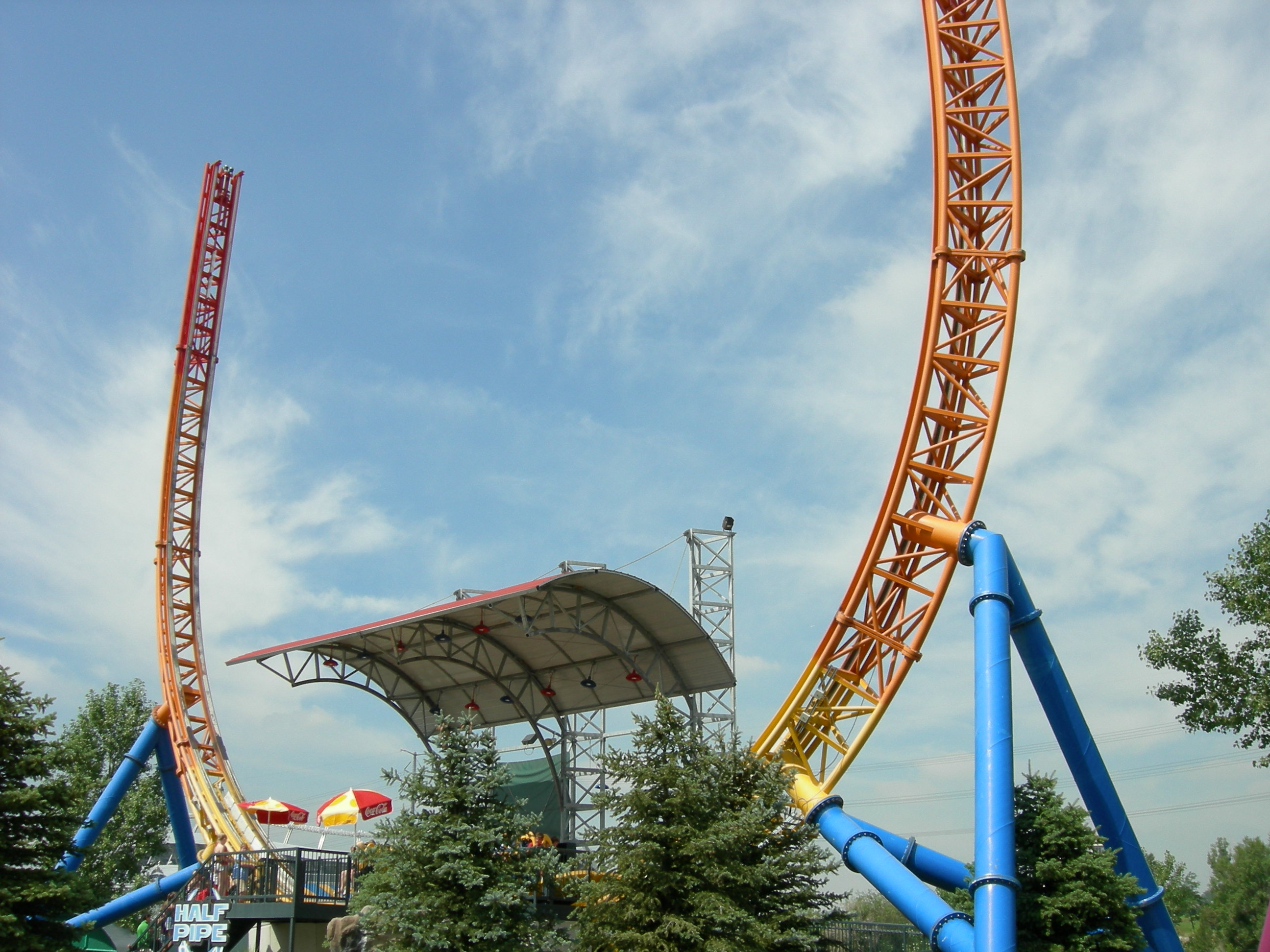
- Half Pipe at Elitch Gardens

Särkänniemi
- Coordinates: 61.503832°N 23.740832°E
- Status: Removed
- Opening date: April 30, 2003
- Closing date: 2019
- Half Pipe at Särkänniemi at RCDB

Elitch Gardens
- Coordinates: 39.748027°N 105.014654°W
- Status: Operating
- Opening date: May 27, 2004
- Half Pipe at Elitch Gardens at RCDB

General statistics
- Type: Steel – Launched – Shuttle
- Manufacturer: Intamin
- Designer: Werner Stengel
- Model: Half Pipe Coaster (30m)
- Track layout: Half pipe coaster
- Lift/launch system: LIM
- Height: 98.4 ft (30.0 m)
- Length: 229.7 ft (70.0 m)
- Speed: 43.5 mph (70.0 km/h)
- Inversions: 0
- Duration: 2:00
- G-force: 4.5
- Height restriction: 52 in (132 cm)
- Trains: Single train with 2 cars, each seating 8 riders

Half Pipe is a steel shuttle roller coaster located at Elitch Gardens in Denver, Colorado. The launched roller coaster was manufactured by Intamin and designed by Werner Stengel. It opened to the public on May 27, 2004. An identical installation opened a year earlier at Särkänniemi in Tampere, Finland, but was closed in 2019. It features an 80-foot (24 m) drop height and a maximum speed of 43.5 mph (70.0 km/h).

Riders are placed in one of two cars on the train which is made to resemble a giant skateboard. Each car is a free-spinning circle that holds eight people. The track is in the shape of an upright "U", and riders board at the base of the track. Linear induction motors accelerate the train up both sides of the track. A ride cycle consists of approximately five to six cycles of the train traveling through the track.

A third Half Pipe installation, identical to the others, was built on top of the Don Quijote store in Roppongi, Tokyo. It was completed in December 2005 but never opened, and it remained standing until its removal in 2017–2018.

On November 13, 2019, the Särkänniemi version was reported as not reopening for the 2020 season.
