= Impulse Coaster =

Form of roller coaster manufactured by Intamin

Impulse roller coaster
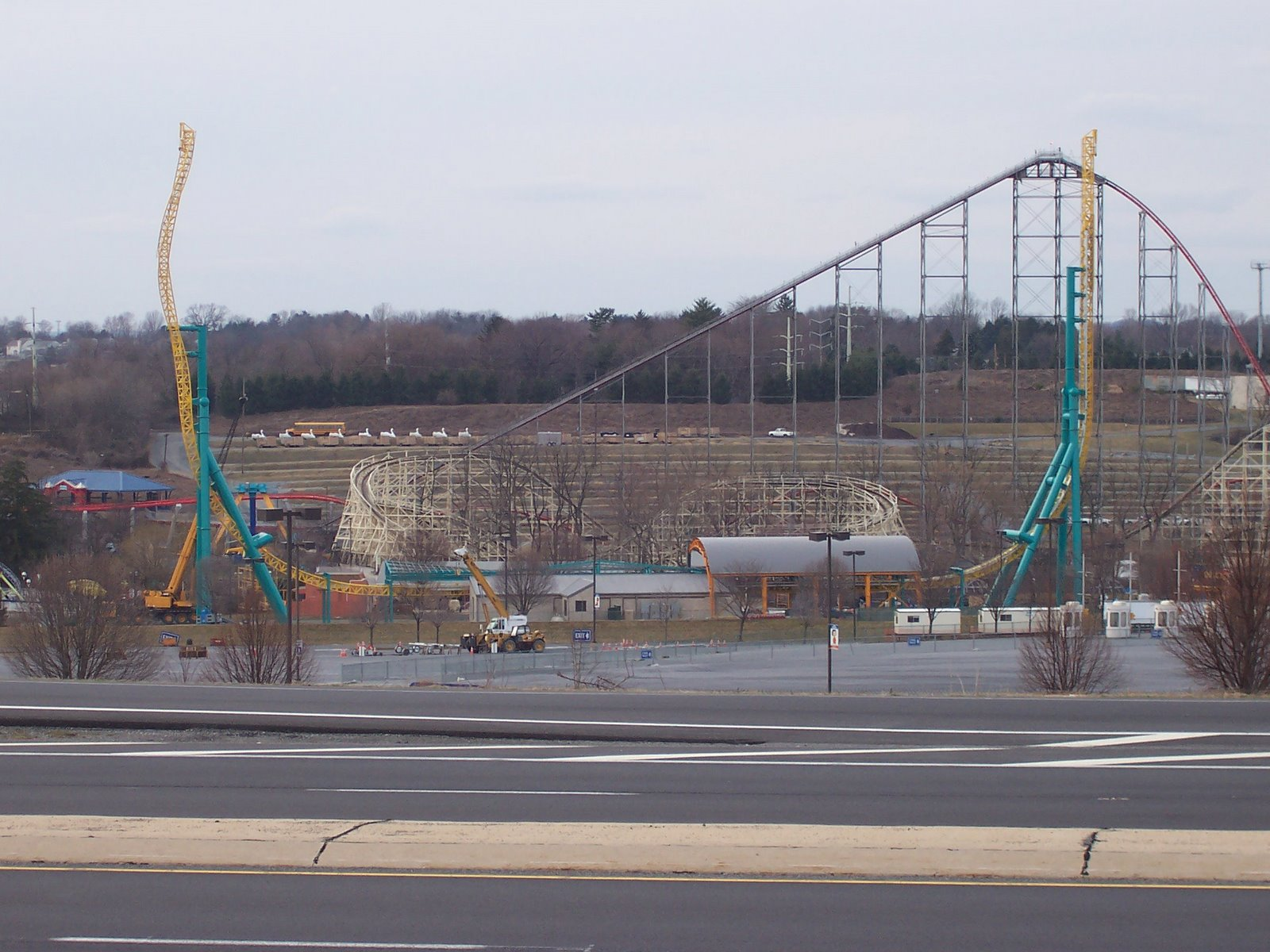
- Possessed at Dorney Park & Wildwater Kingdom
- Status: In production
- First manufactured: 1998
- No. of installations: 8
- Manufacturer: Intamin
- Vehicles: 1
- Restraint Style: Over the shoulder
- Max vertical angle: 90°

An Impulse Coaster is a form of a launched inverted roller coaster manufactured by Intamin. The first Impulse Coaster appeared in Japan, and the ride type has since evolved to include four specific layouts, three of these varieties being built in the United States. It uses LIMs to launch a train out of the station and (in most installations) up a vertical spiral. The train then falls backward, is powered again through the station, and heads up a back tower. The train then falls forward, and continues in this fashion for a total of 2½ cycles per ride (three forward launches, two backward). On the final forward launch, with a slightly reduced speed, the train is sent up the front tower, and brakes then deploy on the launch track. The train then slows down and heads back into the station.

== The original ==
The original Inverted Impulse Coaster, Linear Gale, was built in 1998 at LaQua Amusement Park at Tokyo Dome City in Tokyo, Japan. Like the more modern Impulse Coasters, it began with a LIM launch. However, instead of going through a vertical twist, it simply headed up a straight tower. It headed backward through the launch section and station and into another vertical tower of track, this time facing the ground. After a few more cycles, the train slowed and came to a stop in the station. It closed on October 31, 2010.

== Variations ==
=== Intamin Impulse Coaster ===
The first installation in the United States was Superman: Ultimate Escape at Six Flags Ohio in Aurora, Ohio. Built in 2000, it was the first Intamin Impulse Coaster to feature a vertical twist and a holding brake on the rear tower. However, Wicked Twister built in 2002 at Cedar Point in Sandusky, Ohio, did away with the straight section containing the holding brake and instead had a second twisting tower, however this coaster permanently closed in 2021. The Flash: Vertical Velocity at Six Flags Discovery Kingdom in Vallejo, California originally had the twisted front and vertical rear towers when it was built in 2001 (also then known as V2: Vertical Velocity). However, upon discovery of exceeding the 150 ft. height restriction in the Vallejo area, the ride was altered to have a front section slanting at 45 degrees into an inline roll which ended with a straightaway, and the rear tower was lowered to the 150 ft height limit. The holding brake was also turned off, and has not been used since. The ride reopened in 2002, and is unique among Inverted Impulse Coasters for being the only one with an inversion as the vertical spikes on other Impulses are not inversions. In 2004, Superman: Ultimate Escape was renamed to Steel Venom after Six Flags sold Six Flags Worlds of Adventure (which Six Flags Ohio had been renamed to after merging with adjacent SeaWorld Ohio in 2001) to Cedar Fair and the park reverted to its original name Geauga Lake. It operated under that name until the end of Geauga Lake's 2006 season and then was moved to Dorney Park & Wildwater Kingdom in Allentown, Pennsylvania. In 2008 the ride opened under the name Voodoo but was changed to Possessed the following year. The ride continues to operate at Dorney Park. Steel Venom at Valleyfair was the last brand-new Impulse Coaster to be installed for 18 years. However, in 2021, Chongqing Sunac Land in China opened Legendary Twin Dragon, stealing Wicked Twister’s record as the tallest Impulse Coaster in the world at 230 ft. This installation uses the more modern LSM launch system to launch trains instead of the LIM one used on the previous installations, while also featuring Intamin’s newer high-stress track design.

=== Intamin Suspended Catapult Coaster ===
Although technically not an Inverted Impulse coaster, Volcano: The Blast Coaster utilized technology that would eventually be included in Impulse designs. It was manufactured by Intamin, the same company that manufacturers modern Impulse coasters; thus it utilized LIM motors, trains, and track structure similar to modern Impulse coasters. However, it was unlike Impulse coasters because of its full circuit, multiple train, dual-launch design. It had 2 launches, first to 68 mph and second to 70 mph. In February 2019, Kings Dominion announced that Volcano would be demolished before the 2019 season, citing maintenance issues.

== Installations ==
Name	Park	Opened	Status
Linear Gale	Tokyo Dome City	1998	Demolished
Screaming Condor	Leofoo Village Theme Park	2001	Operating
The Flash: Vertical Velocity; Formerly V2: Vertical Velocity (2001-2021)	Six Flags Great America	2001	Operating
The Flash: Vertical Velocity; Formerly V2: Vertical Velocity (2001-2018)	Six Flags Discovery Kingdom	2001	Operating
Wicked Twister	Cedar Point	2002	Demolished
Steel Venom	Valleyfair	2003	Operating
Possessed; Formerly Superman: Ultimate Escape (2000-2003), Steel Venom (2004-2006), and Voodoo (2008)	Dorney Park & Wildwater Kingdom; Formerly Geauga Lake	2008; 2000-2007	Operating
Legendary Twin Dragon	Chongqing Sunac Land	2021	Operating
