= The Flash: Vertical Velocity (Six Flags Great Adventure) =

Steel roller coaster

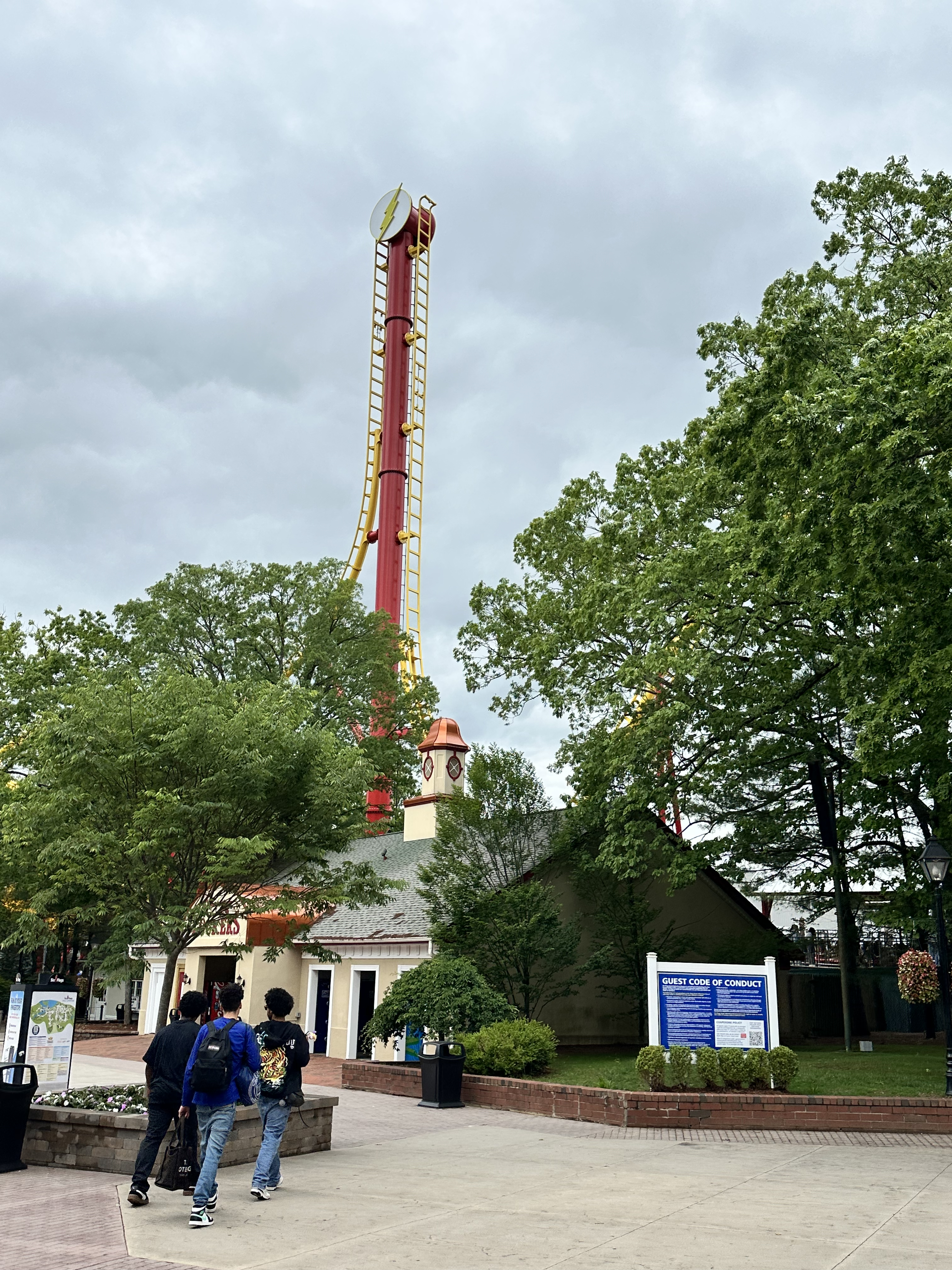
- The Flash: Vertical Velocity's vertical rollback.

Six Flags Great Adventure
- Location: Six Flags Great Adventure
- Park section: Metropolis
- Coordinates: 40°08′13.47″N 74°26′27.5″W
- Status: Operating
- Opening date: March 29, 2025
- Replaced: Cyborg Cyber Spin; Batman & Robin: The Chiller

General statistics
- Type: Steel – Launched – Shuttle
- Manufacturer: Vekoma
- Designer: Benjamin Bloemendaal
- Model: Super Boomerang
- Lift/launch system: LSM
- Height: 172 ft (52 m)
- Length: 1,430.4 ft (436.0 m)
- Speed: 59 mph (95 km/h)
- Inversions: 4 [2 on track, but each run traverses the track twice]
- Capacity: 800 riders per hour
- G-force: 4
- Height restriction: 48 in (122 cm)
- Trains: Single train with 6 cars; riders arranged 2 across in 2 rows for a total of 24 riders per train
- Website: Official website
- Fast Lane available
- The Flash: Vertical Velocity at RCDB

The Flash: Vertical Velocity is a steel roller coaster at Six Flags Great Adventure in Jackson Township, New Jersey. It is a Vekoma Super Boomerang launch coaster themed to the DC Comics character the Flash.

Also a shuttle roller coaster, The Flash features an Immelmann Stall and a zero-g roll and a top speed of 59 miles per hour (95 km/h). The ride is located in the Metropolis section of Six Flags Great Adventure, near Justice League: Battle for Metropolis.

== History ==
=== Background ===
Dutch manufacturer Vekoma first unveiled their new shuttle launch coaster layout through the EAP Magazine in November 2021. Dubbed the "Super Boomerang" as a tribute to their long-running coaster model, the coaster would use multiple banks of LSM launches to ascend spikes on either side of a tower. The design subsequently premiered in July 2023 as the Cloud Shuttle at Xuzhou Fantawild Wonderland in Tongshan, China.

By November 2022, attendance had fallen 33% across the Six Flags chain, with concerns that an ongoing corporate initiative to raise prices and cease investments had begun alienating park guests. Seeking to reverse course, Six Flags sent representatives to the IAAPA Expo in Orlando, Florida that month, where a series of last-minute ride deals were signed off with multiple manufacturers. Vekoma was among those approached by Six Flags, from whom they soon purchased a pre-manufactured junior coaster. Taking the form of Rookie Racer at Six Flags St. Louis, the project's delivery allowed Six Flags to conduct further business with Vekoma.

=== Announcement ===
In August 2023, Six Flags' Chief Financial Officer Gary Mick confirmed that a new roller coaster would be built at Six Flags Great Adventure in 2024, stating that, "We have a 50th Anniversary coming up at our park in New Jersey, and we had an opportunity to add a nice ride kind of late in the game. And that's a little bit rare because it takes generally a while to design and build a coaster. So we had a fortunate opportunity, and we decided to take it". Concurrently, Great Adventure released a teaser presenting various numbers, which were determined to be statistics lining up with Vekoma's Super Boomerang model.

Six Flags Great Adventure officially announced The Flash: Vertical Velocity on August 30, 2023, set to become the park's 15th roller coaster and the first of its kind in the Western Hemisphere. Billed as a part of the park's largest investment in 20 years, it would be joined by the overhauled Safari Off-Road Adventure, Wild Safari Park luxury glamping, and various other park refurbishments. Jackson Township Planning Commissioners officially approved the project on December 18, 2023. An animated trailer for the coaster was later released in March 2024.

=== Construction and opening ===
Deforestation and other land clearing work began behind now-defunct Cyborg Cyber Spin in January 2024, with local contractors Force Concrete constructing its foundations the next month. Track and supports first began arriving from Vekoma in February, and assembly of the ride began at the end of April.

On August 12, 2024, the park announced on their social media accounts that the roller coaster had been delayed until 2025.

On October 20, 2024, Flash began its initial test runs. The ride officially opened to the public on March 29, 2025, the first day of the 2025 season.
