= Possessed (roller coaster) =

Launched roller coaster at Dorney Park

- Previously known as Superman: Ultimate Escape at Six Flags Ohio/Six Flags Worlds of Adventure (2000–2003); Steel Venom at Geauga Lake (2004–2006); Voodoo at Dorney Park & Wildwater Kingdom (2008)
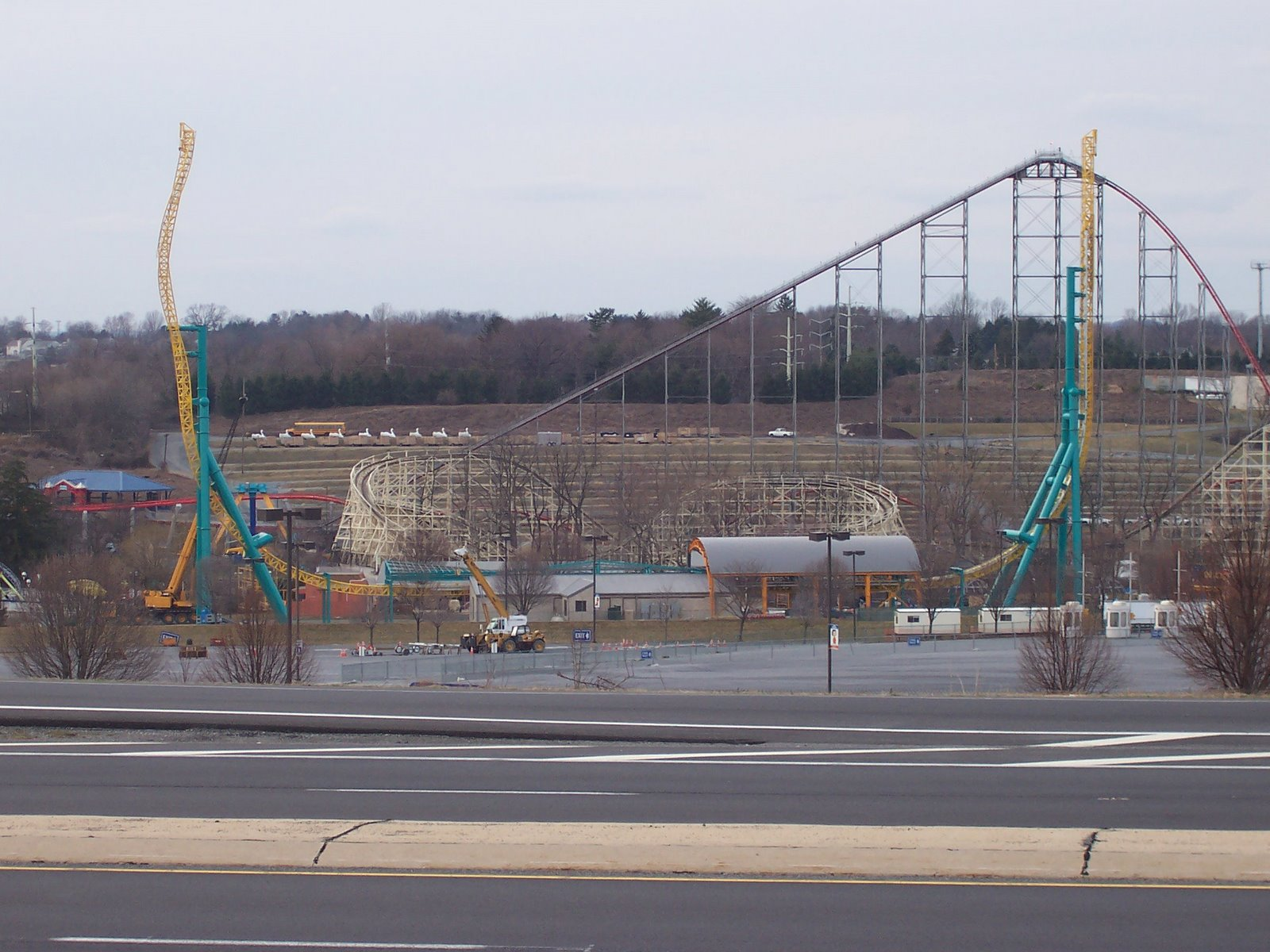
- Possessed at Dorney Park & Wildwater Kingdom in Allentown, Pennsylvania as seen off-season from the parking lot

Dorney Park & Wildwater Kingdom
- Park section: Steel Yard
- Coordinates: 40.579868°N 75.533559°W
- Status: Operating
- Opening date: May 17, 2008
- Replaced: Skyscraper

Geauga Lake
- Coordinates: 41.349567°N 81.379445°W
- Status: Removed
- Opening date: May 5, 2000
- Closing date: 2006

General statistics
- Type: Steel – Inverted – Launched
- Manufacturer: Intamin
- Designer: Werner Stengel
- Model: Twisted impulse coaster
- Track layout: Shuttle roller coaster
- Lift/launch system: LIM launch
- Height: 180 ft (55 m)
- Length: 704 ft (215 m)
- Speed: 70 mph (110 km/h)
- Inversions: 0
- Max vertical angle: 90°
- Capacity: 950 riders per hour
- G-force: 3.7
- Height restriction: 52–78 in (132–198 cm)
- Trains: Single train with 7 cars; riders arranged 2 across in 2 rows for a total of 28 riders per train
- Fast Lane available
- Possessed at RCDB

Possessed is an inverted impulse launched roller coaster located at Dorney Park & Wildwater Kingdom in Allentown, Pennsylvania. Manufactured by Intamin and designed by Werner Stengel, the roller coaster originally debuted at Six Flags Ohio amusement park as Superman: Ultimate Escape on May 5, 2000. After Cedar Fair purchased the park and restored its Geauga Lake name in early 2004, the coaster was immediately renamed Steel Venom. The ride closed in 2006 and was moved to Dorney Park. It reopened in 2008 briefly under the name Voodoo, and was renamed Possessed for the 2009 season. The model is identical to five other impulse coaster installations at other amusement parks. A larger version called Wicked Twister was located at Cedar Point until its closure in September 2021.

== History ==
=== Geauga Lake era (2000–2006) ===
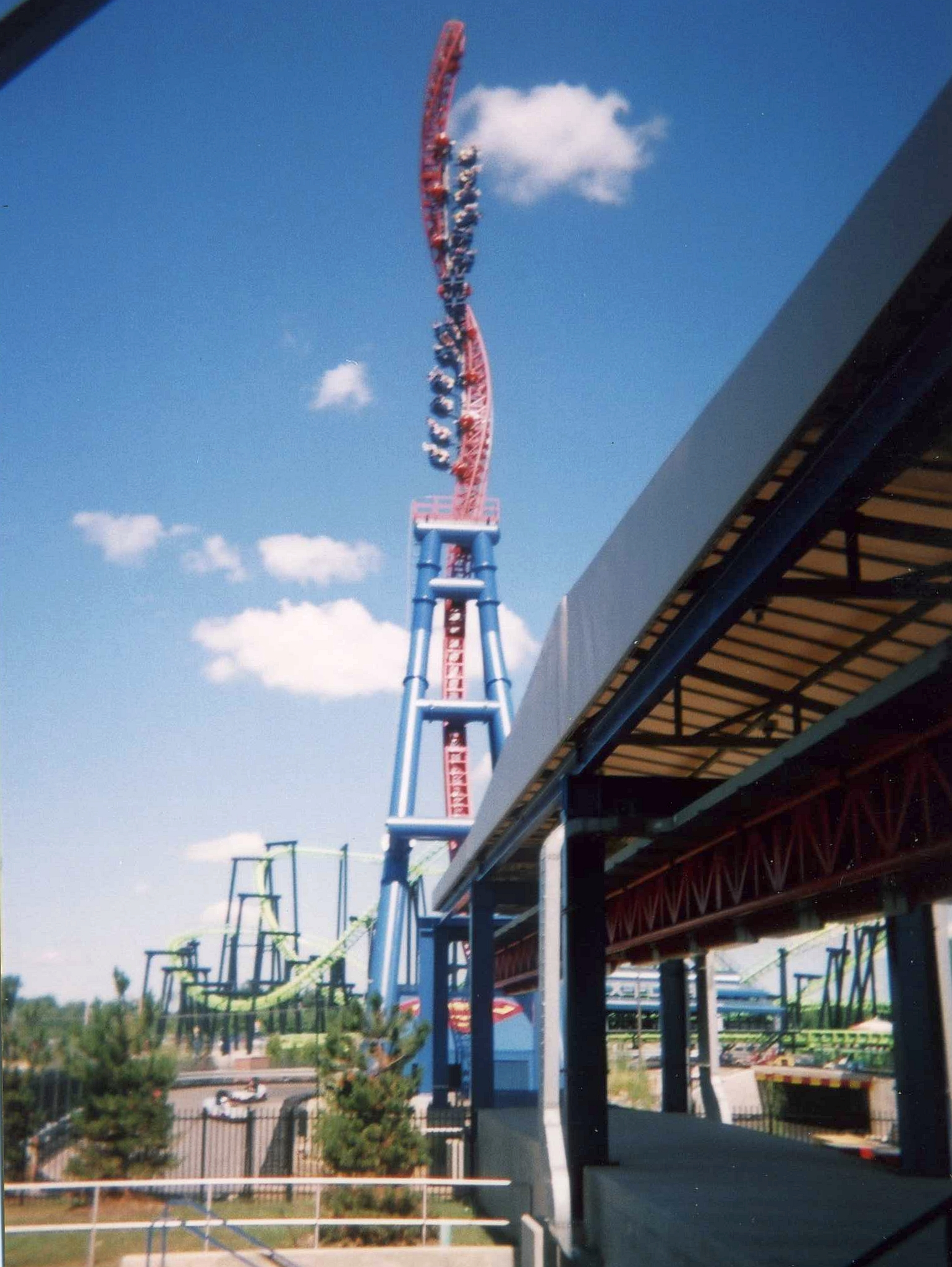
Possessed when it was known as Superman: Ultimate Escape at Six Flags Ohio during the early 2000s.

The ride opened on May 5, 2000 at Six Flags Ohio as Superman: Ultimate Escape. It was based on the DC Comics character Superman. Following Cedar Fair's acquisition of the park in 2004, in which the original Geauga Lake name was reinstituted to the park, all Looney Tunes and DC Comics branding owned by Six Flags was removed. In the process, the coaster was renamed Steel Venom, while receiving a new logo with a black background featuring a silver and purple snake. Even though Cedar Fair removed any mentions of Superman from the ride, the original blue, red, and yellow color scheme remained intact.

The coaster was dismantled after the 2006 season and put into storage. At the end of the 2007 season, Cedar Fair announced the amusement park section of Geauga Lake would close, leaving only the water park, Wildwater Kingdom, in operation. Many rides at the park were relocated to other parks in the Cedar Fair chain.

=== Dorney Park era (2007–present) ===
Steel Venom was relocated to Dorney Park, where it reopened as Voodoo several weeks into the 2008 season on May 17, 2008. Prior to opening at Dorney Park, it was repainted to its current color scheme, with teal supports and yellow track. In 2009, the name was changed to Possessed after Six Flags expressed concerns over the name Voodoo, which it had recently trademarked for another ride. Instead of challenging, Cedar Fair opted to appease Six Flags and rename the coaster. Cedar Fair turned the incident into a marketing opportunity, which focused on a story that the ride was overtaken by evil spirits, fitting in line with the ride's original theme.

Possessed was closed for the entire 2020 season due to the COVID-19 pandemic. It reopened in 2021.

== Design ==
The coaster's layout consists of two vertical spikes, one twisted and the other straight vertical with a holding brake, connected by a launch and station tract to form a basic "U" layout. The original ride began with riders being launched forward by the use of linear induction motors. After the initial launch, the train heads up the twisted vertical spike that twists the train 180 degrees. The train then falls and is launched backwards up the vertical spike. It shuttles back and forth three times. During the ride's initial years, the holding brake at the top of the vertical rear spike would engage on the final launch, locking the train in place for a very brief moment. This holding brake is no longer operational. Valleyfair's Steel Venom is currently the only Intamin impulse coaster in the United States still operating with its holding brake.

The maximum G-force of the ride is 3.7 Gs, expectantly low for a twisted impulse coaster.

== Gallery ==
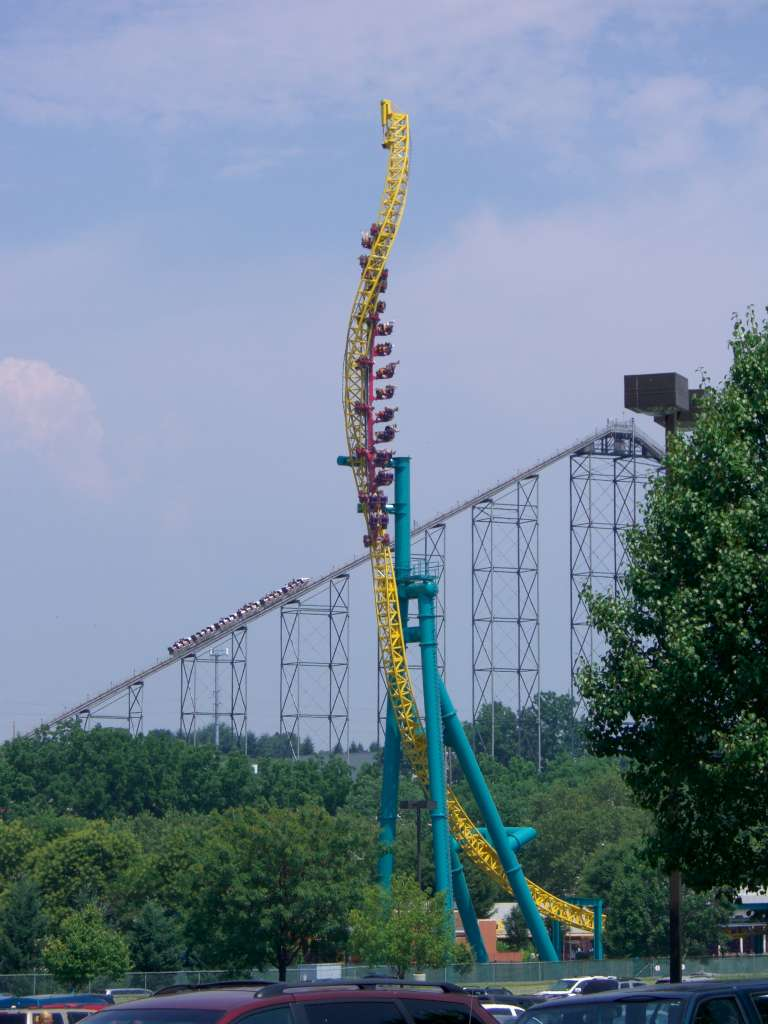
Twisted spike

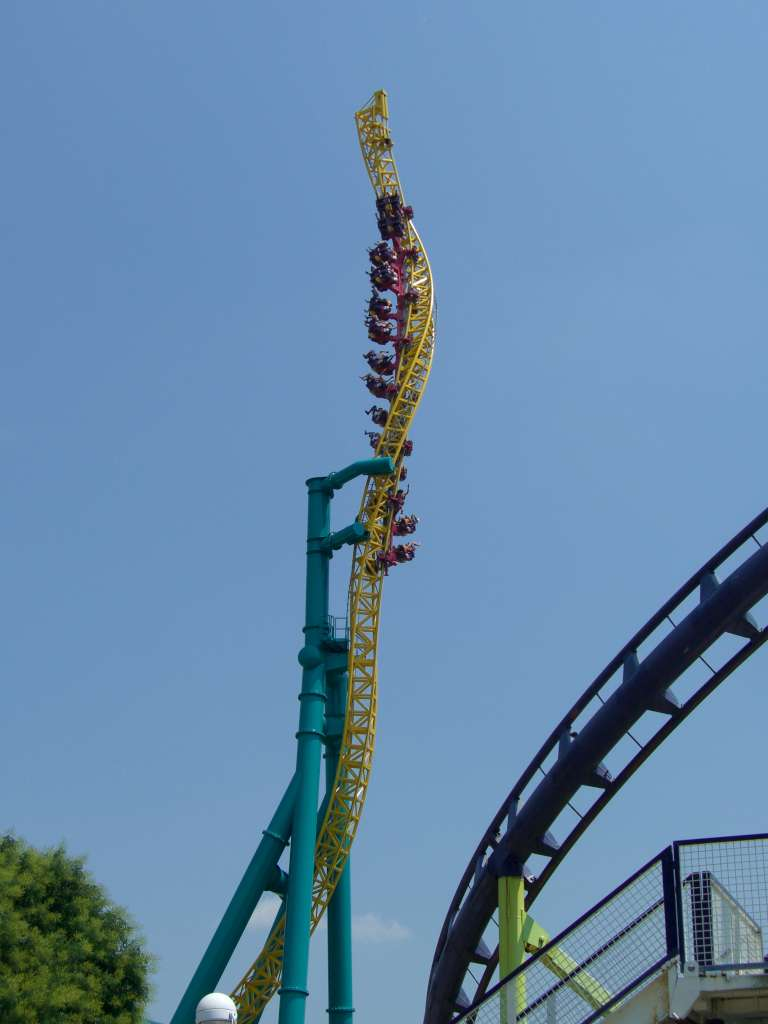
Twisted spike

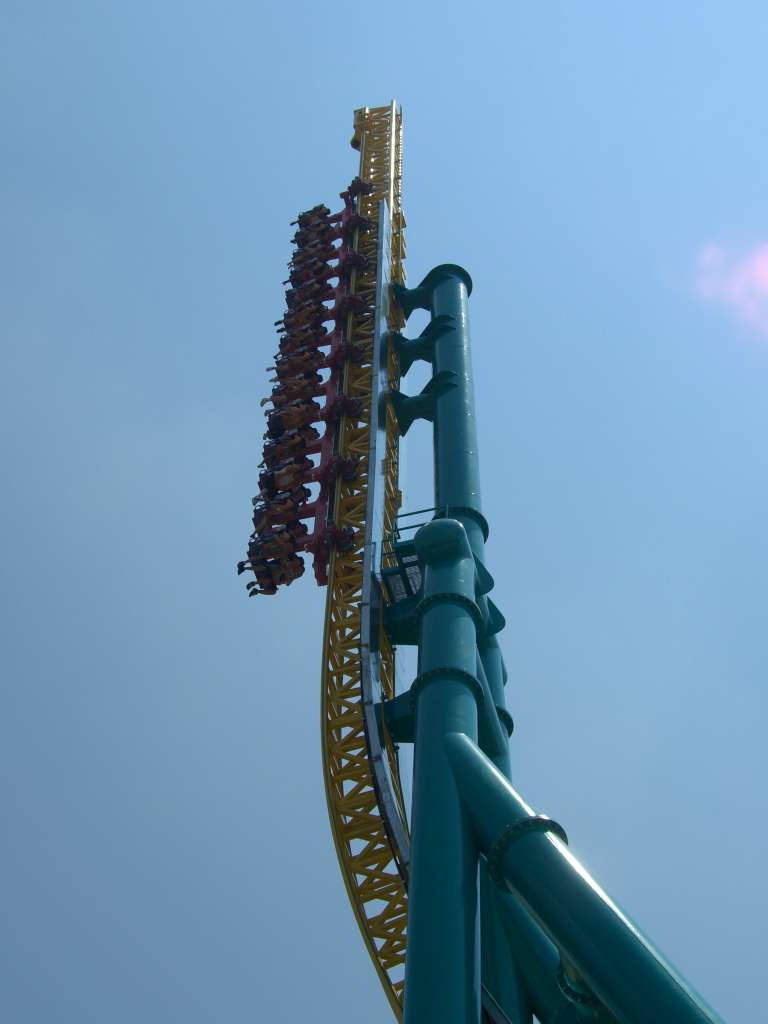
Straight spike

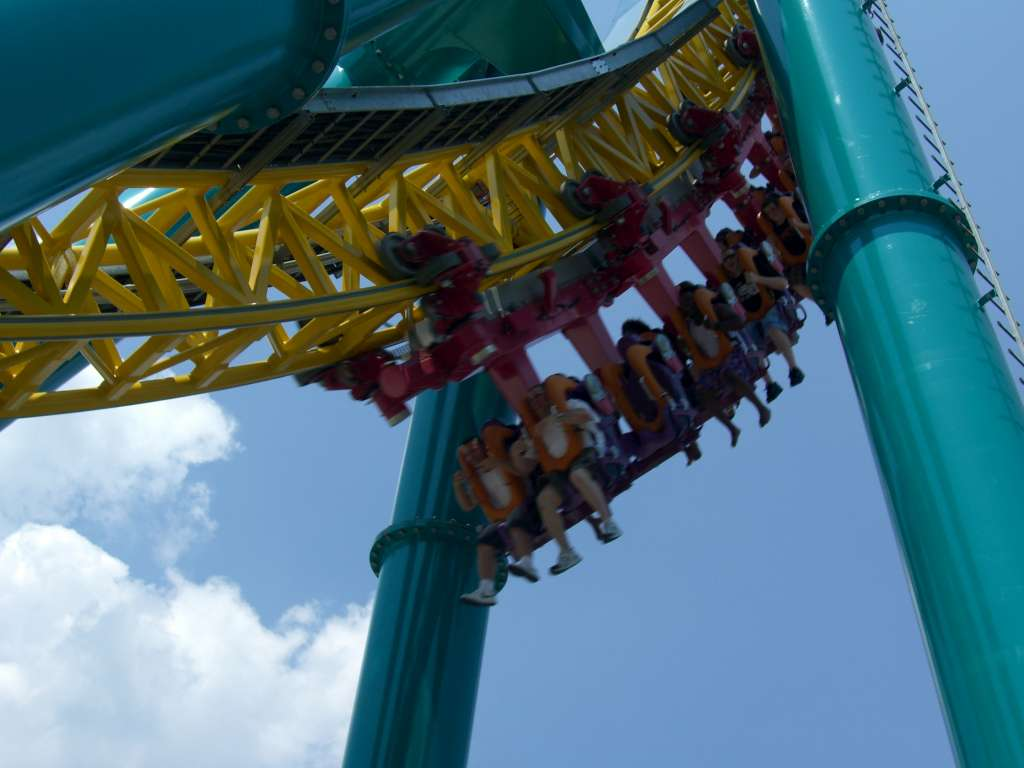
Train exiting the straight spike

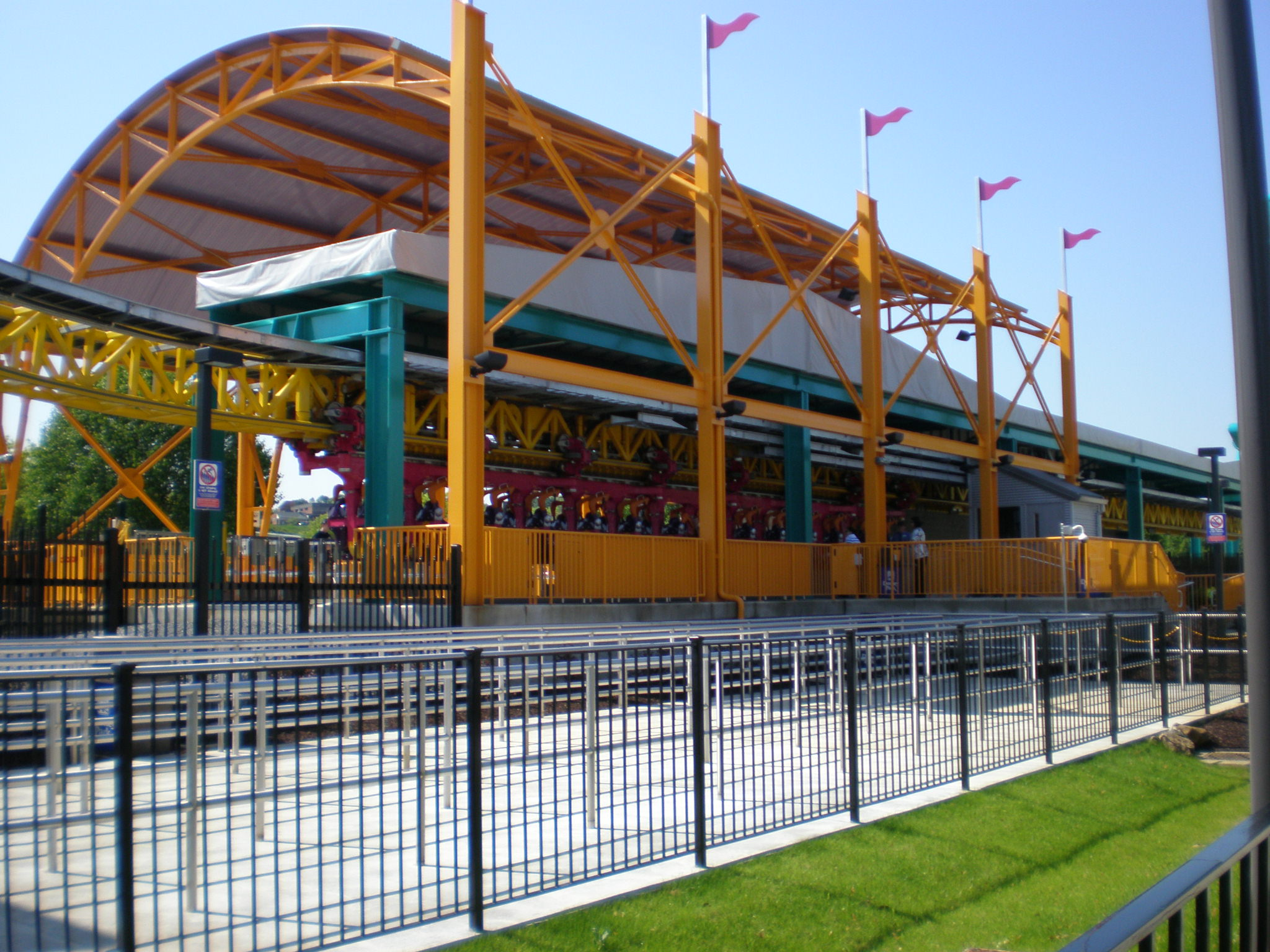
Station and queue line

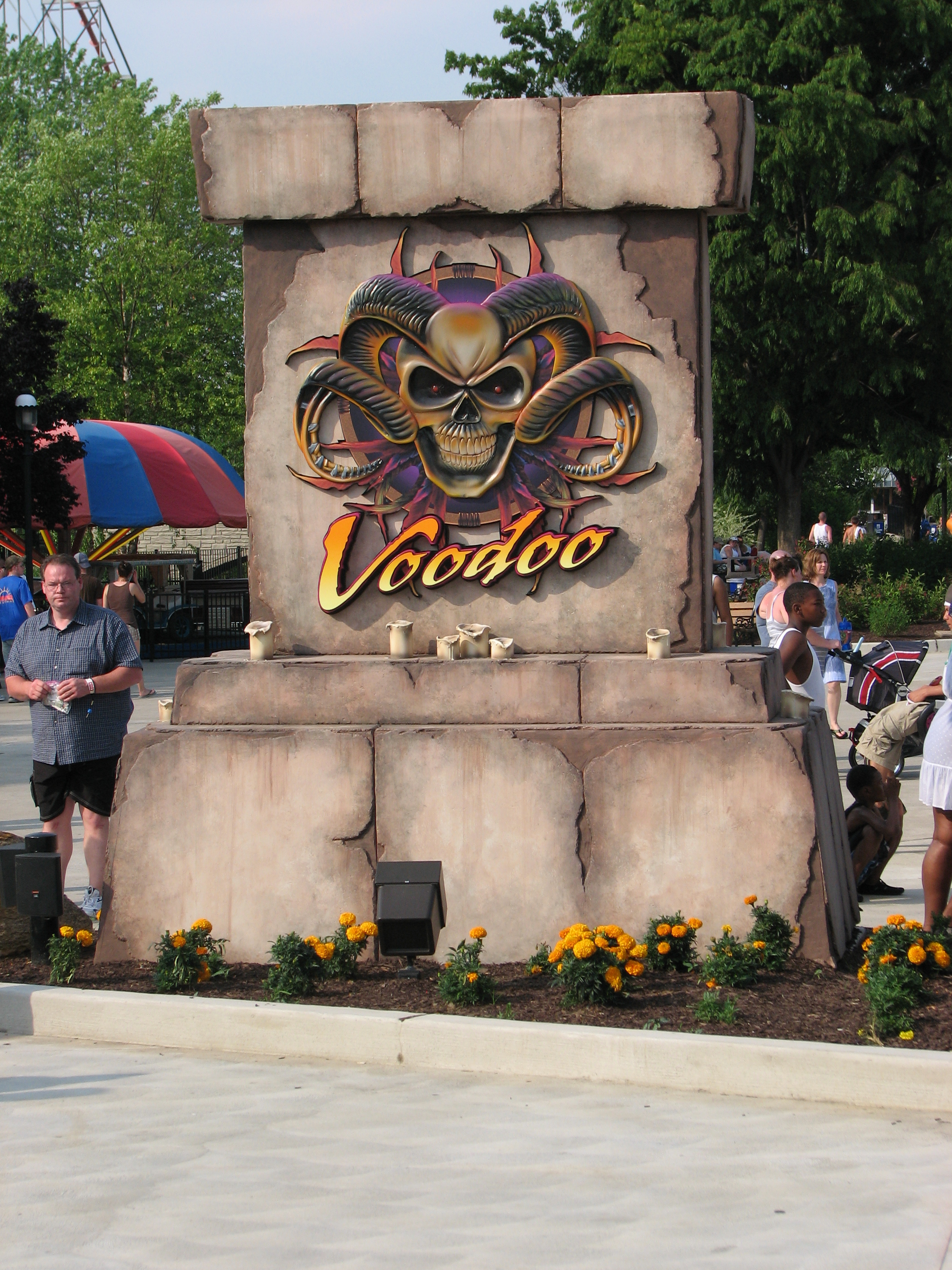
Entrance sign from when it was known as Voodoo
