= Shuttle roller coaster =

Type of roller coaster

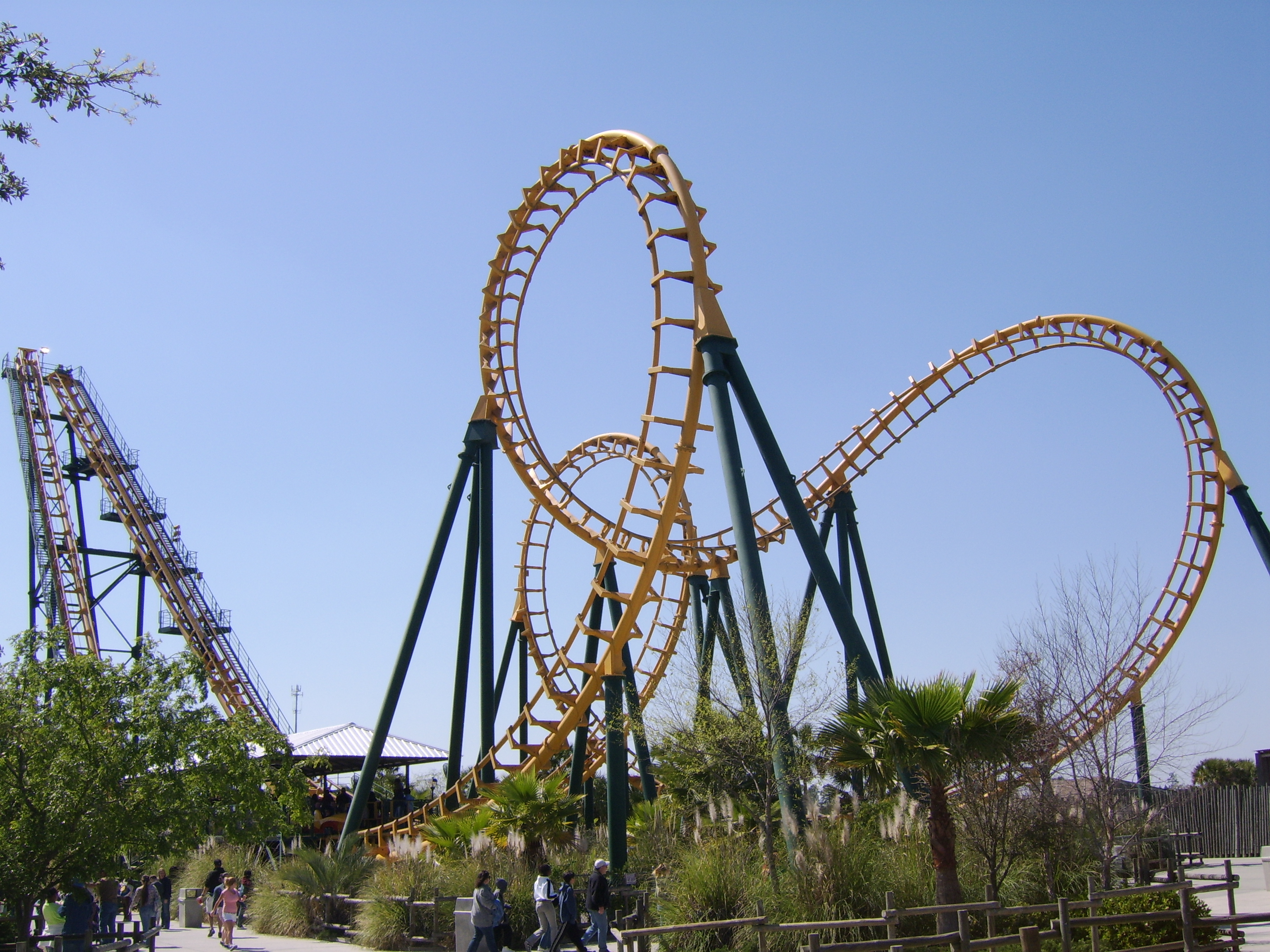
Vekoma's Boomerang is one of the most common shuttle coasters

A shuttle roller coaster is any roller coaster that ultimately does not make a complete circuit, but rather reverses at some point throughout its course and traverses the same track backwards. These are sometimes referred to as boomerang roller coasters, due to the ubiquity of Vekoma's Boomerang coaster model.

== Early history ==
The first shuttle coasters were in fact the first roller coasters ever built. Inspired by the so-called "Russian Mountains," these wheeled cars built on tracks found popularity in the early 19th century in Paris.

In 1884, Switchback Railway opened at Coney Island, and consisted of a car that traveled on two tracks between two towers. It was the first roller coaster designed as an amusement ride in America. The next shuttle roller coaster to be built was Backety-Back Scenic Railway, built in 1909.

== First launched shuttle coasters ==
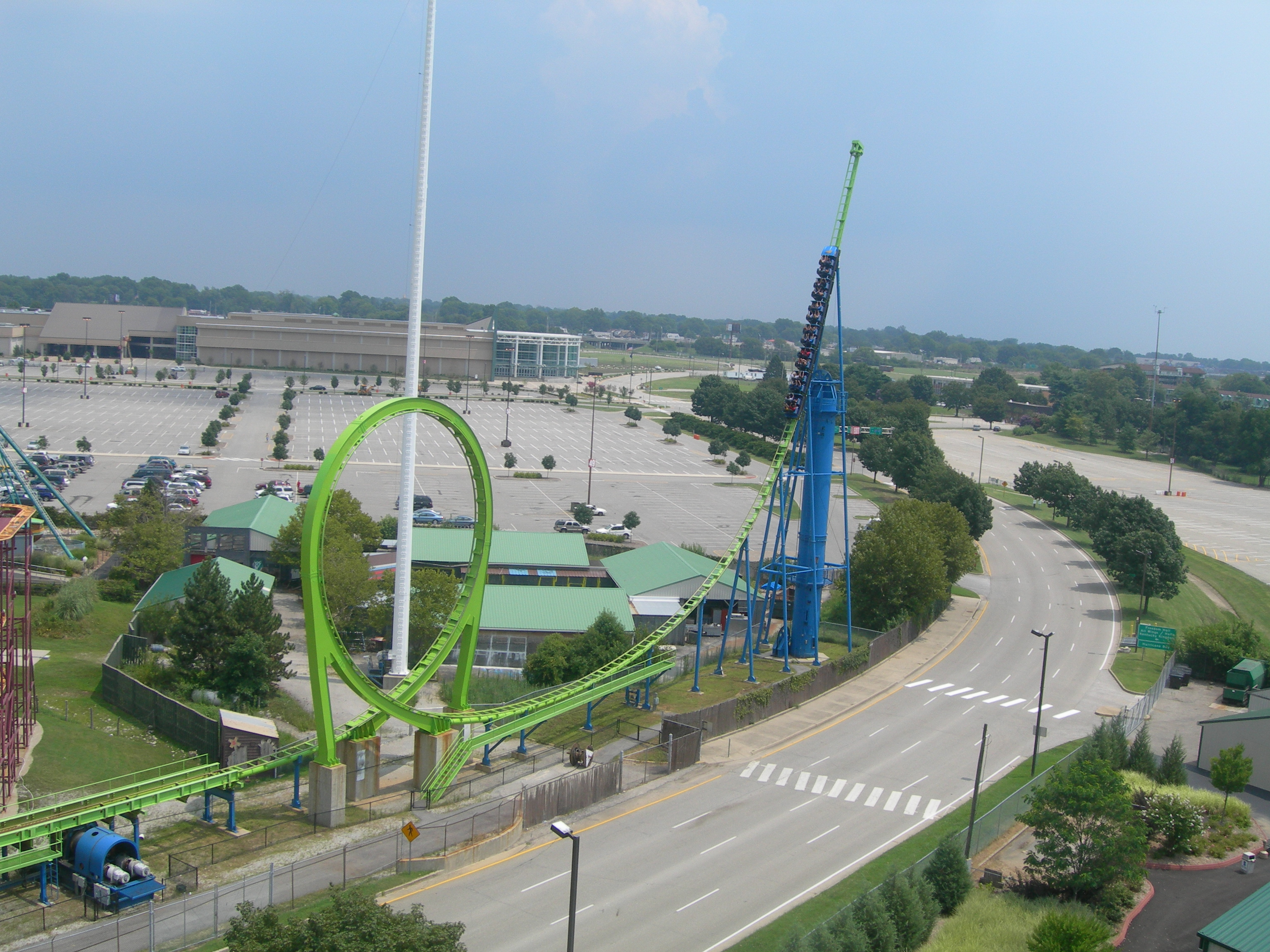
A Schwarzkopf-designed launched roller coaster, Greezed Lightnin' at Kentucky Kingdom (opened in April 2003, after it was relocated from Six Flags Great America, then Six Flags Over Georgia, closed in November 2009)

The first two launched shuttle coaster designs were introduced in 1977 by competitors Arrow Development and Anton Schwarzkopf. Arrow built and opened three that year including Black Widow (now defunct) at Riverside Park, Screamin' Demon (also defunct) at Kings Island, and Zoomerang at Circus World (now located to Fun Spot Amusement Park & Zoo). Arrow's models used an electric motor to launch the train. Anton Schwarzkopf went with a different design using a dropped weight as a launch mechanism. This design was known as the Shuttle Loop. The first three built by that company were King Kobra at Kings Dominion (now located at Hopi Hari in Brazil), White Lightnin' at Carowinds (now located at Gold Reef City in South Africa), and Tidal Wave at California's Great America.

Schwarzkopf later upgraded its launch mechanism to a flywheel design. The first two roller coasters based on this new design were both released in 1978 - Montezooma's Revenge at Knott's Berry Farm and Greezed Lightnin' at Six Flags AstroWorld, currently in storage in Plainview, Texas for Cliff's Amusement Park in New Mexico. The first flywheel launched roller coaster that opened in Europe was Sirocco at Walibi Wavre in 1982.

In 1982, Schwarzkopf debuted variant model "Wiener Loop" at Wiener Prater. Wiener loop use tire propelled launch, pulls to the top and dropping forward through the station, turn right and pass the vertical loop that cross the station, and turn left traveled up opposite side hill, through the curve and loop, into the station.

== Japanese shuttle coasters ==
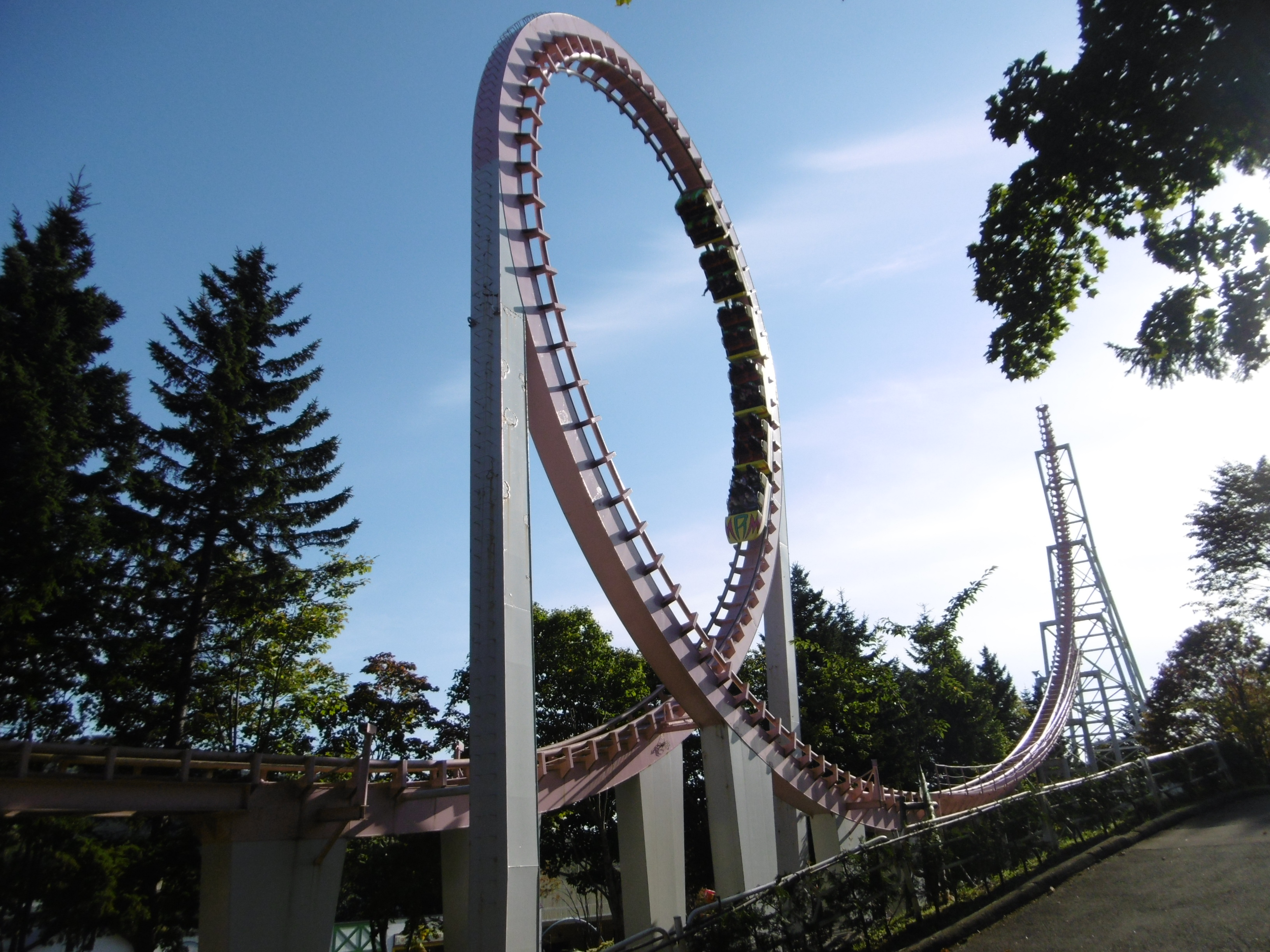
Loop the loop at Rusutsu Resort

In 1979, Meisho Amusement Machines debuted "Loop Coaster" at Tojoko Land. Afterwards, Meisho debuted an improved model named "Loop the Loop." It was installed at a few amusement parks in Japan, along with a variation on the model, Moonsault Scramble. Meisho's model used a catch car lift, which pulled the train to the top of a spike before dropping it backward through the station into a single vertical loop. The train would then travel up another spike, fall back down, traverse the loop again (this time facing forwards), and enter the station.

In 1980, Senyo Kogyo debuted "Atomic Coaster" at Mitsui Greenland, and this model was also installed at other amusement parks in Japan. Senyo's model used a chain lift, pulling the train onto a plateau and dropping it back downwards, similar to the Shuttle Loops built by Arrow. The train went through the station, into a loop, and up a spike, before traversing the layout forwards and entering the station.

== Vekoma's Boomerang ==
In 1984, Vekoma debuted its Boomerang shuttle coaster, which features a lift hill rather than a launched train. In addition to the original Boomerang, Vekoma also designed the Invertigo and the Giant Inverted Boomerang. As of 2018, 55 Boomerangs and its variants are currently in operation around the world.

== Linear motor launched shuttle coasters ==
In 1996, Premier Rides debuted the first coasters ever to use linear induction motors, and in 1997 opened Batman & Robin: The Chiller at Six Flags Great Adventure, a pair of dueling launched shuttle coasters.

Intamin introduced its reverse freefall coaster in 1997. In these models, the train is accelerated out of the station along a long, level track using linear synchronous motors, rises straight up a vertical tower, then free falls back down to return to the station. Only two reverse freefall coasters were built: Tower of Terror II at Dreamworld, and Superman: Escape from Krypton at Six Flags Magic Mountain, both of which first broke the 300 foot and 400 foot barriers. Tower of Terror II, however, was discontinued in 2019. Similarly, Superman: Escape from Krypton was permanently closed in March of 2025, after maintenance which closed it in September 2024.

In 1998, Intamin introduced its first impulse coaster, Linear Gale at Korakuen Amusement Park in Japan, which featured inverted trains traversing two vertical towers. In 2000, Intamin introduced Superman Ultimate Escape with a spiral tower and one vertical tower. Intamin introduced Wicked Twister in 2002, a variation with two spiral towers. With each pass through the station the train accelerates faster and travels further up the towers.

== Modern shuttle coasters ==
The first modern wooden shuttle coaster, Switchback, opened at ZDT's Amusement Park in 2015. Manufactured by The Gravity Group, the ride utilizes a traditional lift hill like most wooden coasters but ends on a tower before traversing the course backwards and returning to the station via a switch track.

Vekoma introduced their Super Boomerang model in 2023, which utilizes a vertical lift and rotating platform to drop riders through four inversions and ten airtime moments.

== See also ==
- Shuttle Loop — shuttle coasters manufactured by Schwarzkopf
- Launched roller coaster — shuttle and non-shuttle coasters by various manufacturers
