= The Flash: Vertical Velocity (Six Flags Great America) =

Inverted steel roller coaster

- Previously known as Vertical Velocity (2001-2021)

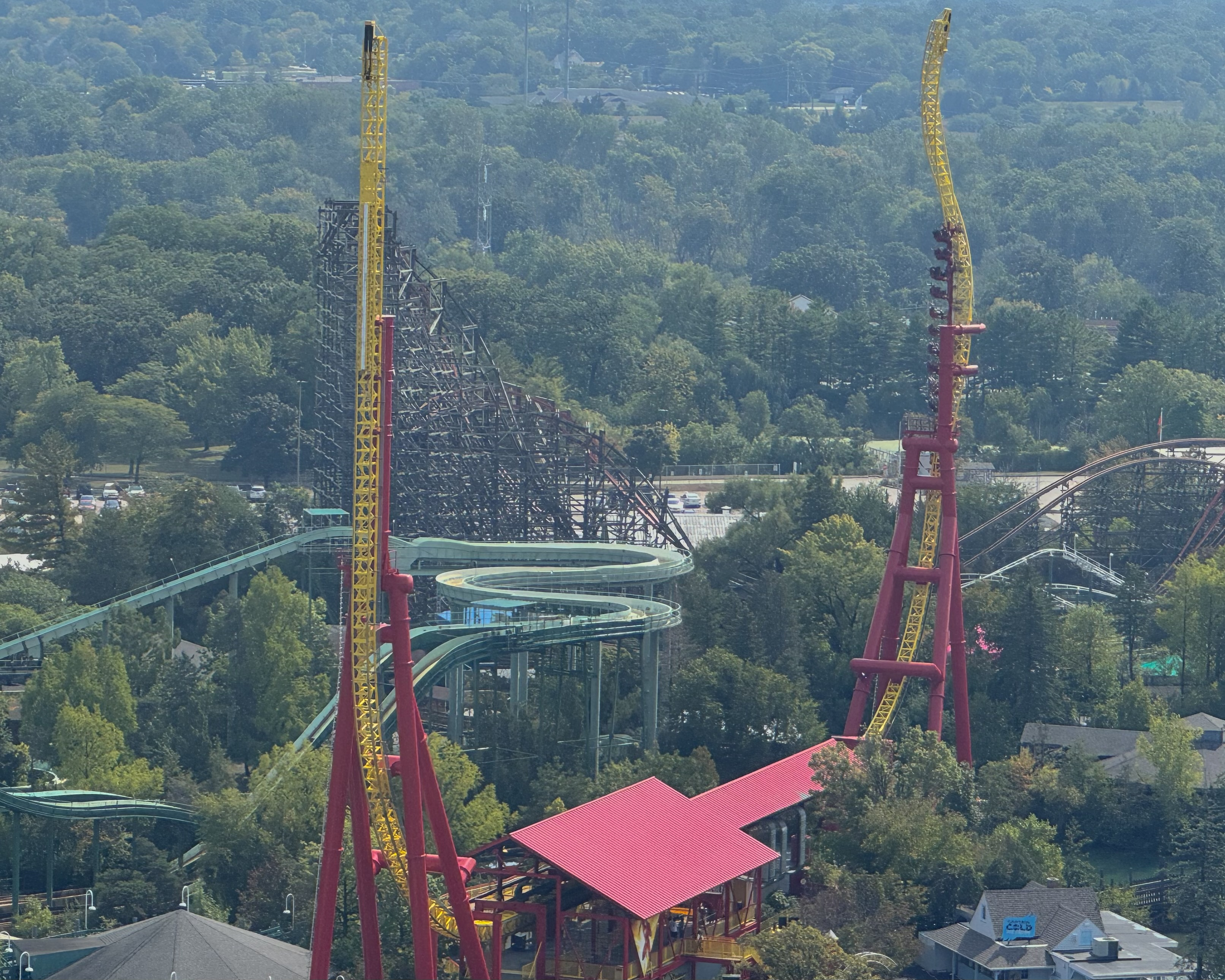
- The overall layout of The Flash: Vertical Velocity.

Six Flags Great America
- Location: Six Flags Great America
- Park section: DC Universe
- Coordinates: 42°22′04.59″N 87°55′56.70″W
- Status: Operating
- Opening date: May 18, 2001; 25 years ago
- Replaced: Whirligig

General statistics
- Type: Steel – Inverted – Launched
- Manufacturer: Intamin
- Model: Shuttle Coaster
- Track layout: Twisted Impulse
- Lift/launch system: LIM
- Height: 186 ft (57 m)
- Length: 630 ft (190 m)
- Speed: 70 mph (110 km/h)
- Inversions: 0
- Capacity: 1100 riders per hour
- Height restriction: 52–80 in (132–203 cm)
- Trains: Single train with 7 cars; riders arranged 2 across in 2 rows for a total of 28 riders per train
- Website: www.sixflags.com/greatamerica/attractions/flash-vertical-velocity
- Fast Lane available
- Must transfer from wheelchair
- The Flash: Vertical Velocity at RCDB

The Flash: Vertical Velocity (originally and colloquially known as Vertical Velocity or V2) is a launched inverted roller coaster located at Six Flags Great America in Gurnee, Illinois, United States. Manufactured by Intamin, the Impulse roller coaster model opened on May 18, 2001. It is located in the DC Universe section of the park, receiving its theme to the DC Comics character The Flash in 2022. The ride launches riders from 0 to 70 mph (110 km/h) in four seconds and is 186 feet (57 m) tall.

== History ==
=== Vertical Velocity (2001-2021) ===
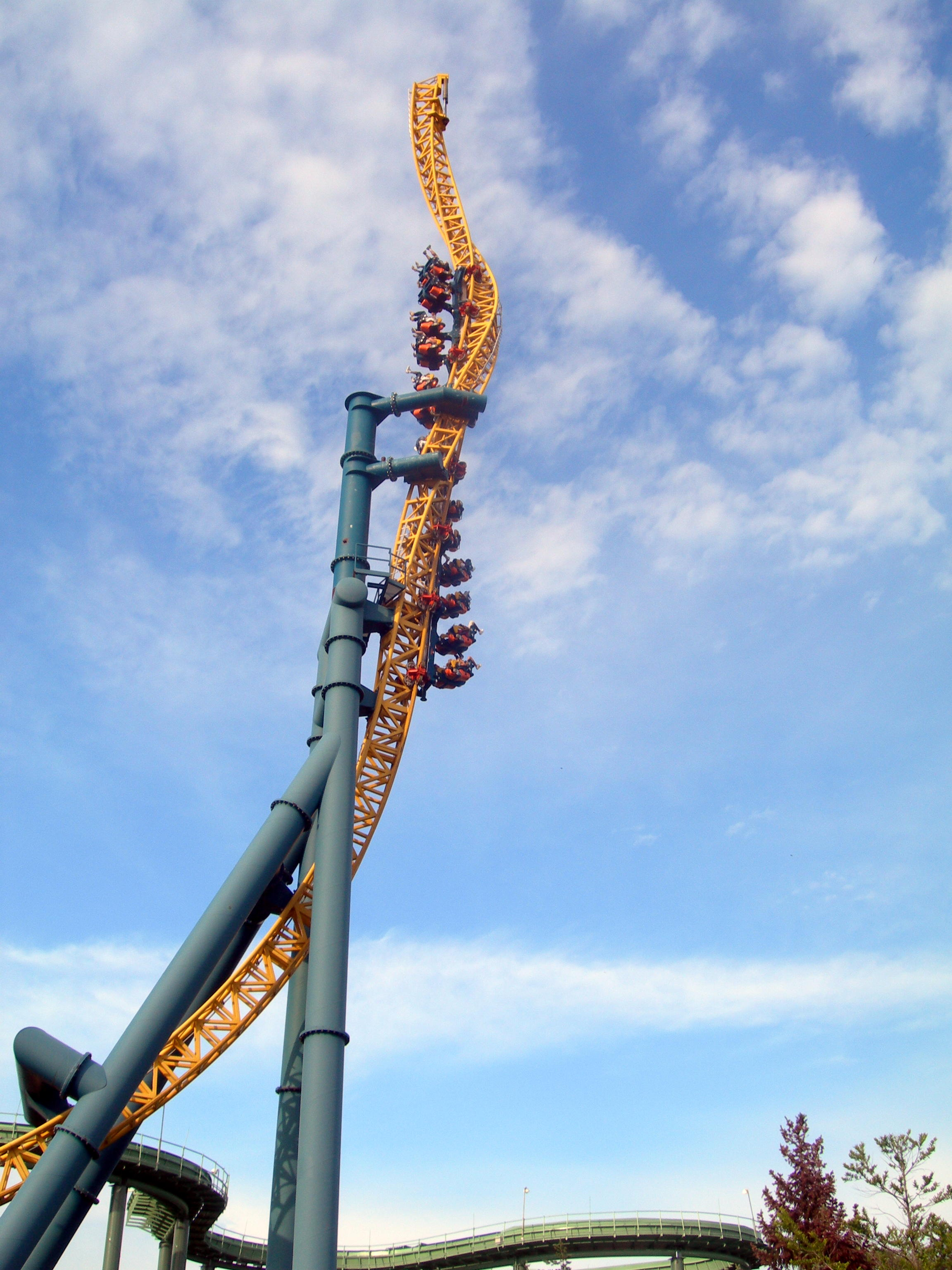
The ride's twisted spike when it was previously known as Vertical Velocity and had blue colored supports.

On March 12, 2001, Six Flags Great America announced the addition of two new roller coasters. These were Vertical Velocity and Déjà Vu. Two months later, Vertical Velocity would officially open on May 18, 2001. The ride also had another clone at Six Flags Discovery Kingdom, which was modified in 2002 due to height limit restrictions.

Upon opening, Vertical Velocity became the fastest inverted roller coaster of all time, tying its record with Superman: Ultimate Escape at Geauga Lake and Volcano: The Blast Coaster at Kings Dominion. All three roller coasters were surpassed by Wicked Twister at Cedar Point in 2002. Plus, the attraction became the second tallest inverted roller coaster at the time, behind Busch Gardens Williamsburg's Alpengeist.

=== The Flash: Vertical Velocity (2022-present) ===
Before the 2021 season had begun, the park had teased at an American Coaster Enthusiasts No Coaster Con event that the ride would be rethemed. In September 2021, Vertical Velocity closed temporarily for repainting. The park teased that the new attraction would be themed to The Flash from a sign placed outside of the ride's entrance which read, "Will be back in a Flash in 2022". The supports were repainted red (originally teal) and the track remained yellow.

On March 24, 2022, the park announced the ride to be rethemed to The Flash: Vertical Velocity, which would fit in with the new DC Universe section of the park, becoming the third roller coaster in the area to be themed to a DC Comics hero, following Batman: The Ride and The Joker. The Flash: Vertical Velocity would be themed to the DC Comics superhero The Flash. The station building was painted red with The Flash decals on the front with red painted supports and red trains. The ride re-opened on May 8, 2022, as DC Universe officially re-opened on May 26, 2022.

== Ride experience ==
The coaster's single seven-car (28-passenger) train runs along a 200 m (656 ft) U-shaped track, incorporating two 186-foot (57 m) vertical towers. The forward tower incorporates a twisted spiral and the rearward towering provides a straight freefall.

The 20 m (65 ft) train, propelled by linear induction motors (LIMs), is accelerated in less than four seconds to 70 mph (110 km/h) toward the forward tower before dropping back down through the station house and up the rearward tower. A holding brake is incorporated on the rear straight tower and was able to suspend the train momentarily (usually on the final ascent during each ride) before dropping it back down to the station house. However, the holding brake has not been used since September 2008 due to maintenance issues. The train passes, at speed, through the station four times per 2,700-foot (820 m) ride and is smoothly braked by eddy-current braking before being brought into final position at the station by the LIMs.

The Flash: Vertical Velocity was a clone of The Flash: Vertical Velocity at Six Flags Discovery Kingdom before the Discovery Kingdom attraction had its twisted spike modified one year after both rides opened to the public.

== Timeline ==
- 2001 – Construction completed; operation begun.
- 2021 – Closed temporarily for a repaint - "Back in a Flash."
- 2022 – Vertical Velocity was re-themed to The Flash: Vertical Velocity with the addition of DC Universe; ride repainted to red supports.
