= Wicked Twister =

Defunct roller coaster

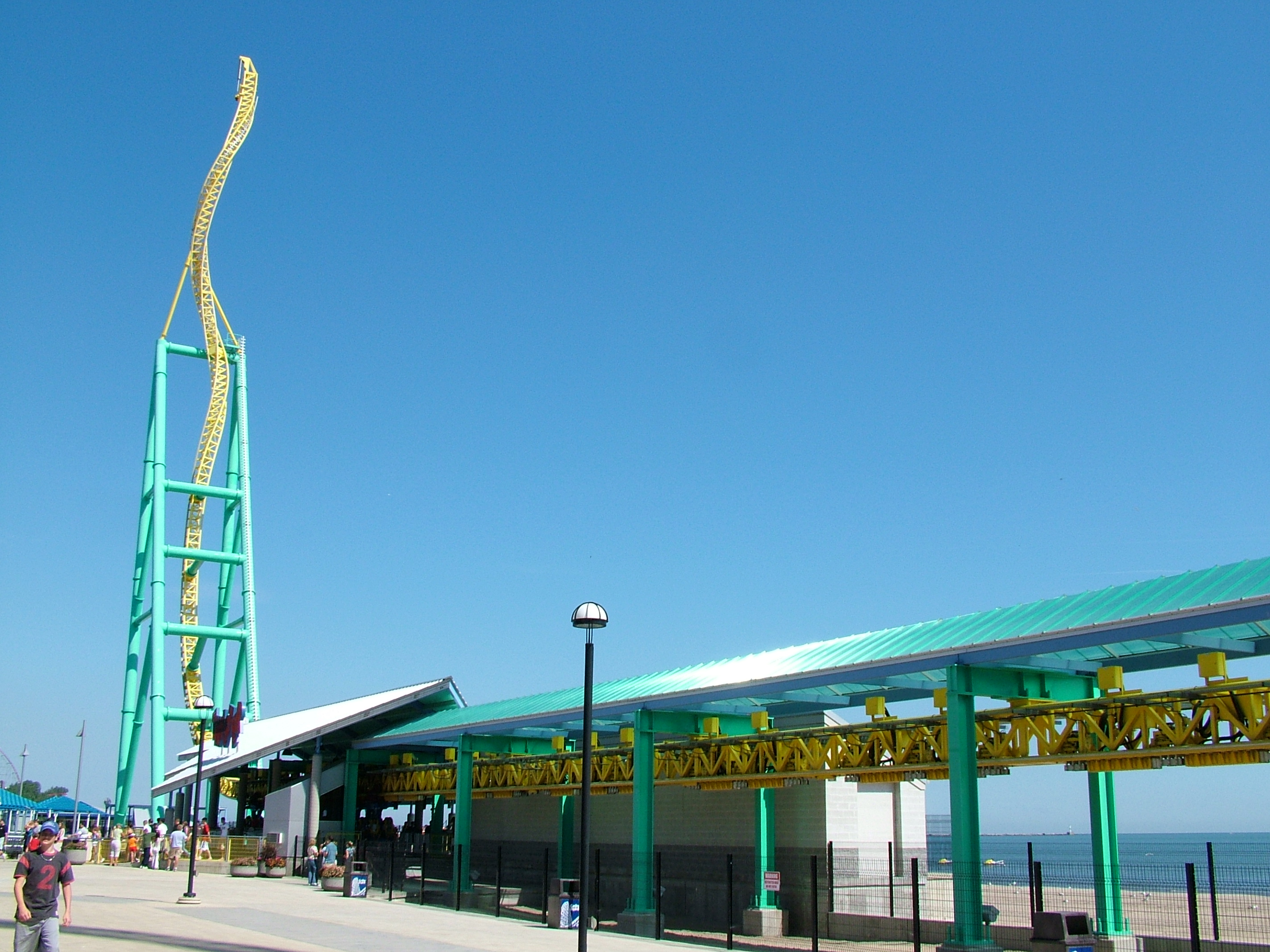

Cedar Point
- Location: Cedar Point
- Coordinates: 41°28′55.25″N 82°40′47.50″W
- Status: Removed
- Soft opening date: May 2, 2002
- Opening date: May 5, 2002
- Closing date: September 7, 2021
- Cost: $9 million
- Replaced: Aquarium
- Replaced by: Grand Pavilion Restaurant & Bar

General statistics
- Type: Steel – Inverted – Launched
- Manufacturer: Intamin
- Designer: Werner Stengel
- Model: Twisted Impulse Coaster
- Lift/launch system: LIM Launch track
- Height: 215 ft (66 m)
- Drop: 206 ft (63 m)
- Length: 675 ft (206 m)
- Speed: 72 mph (116 km/h)
- Inversions: 0
- Max vertical angle: 90°
- Capacity: 1000 riders per hour
- Height restriction: 52–78 in (132–198 cm)
- Trains: Single train with 8 cars; riders arranged 2 across in 2 rows for a total of 32 riders per train
- Wicked Twister at RCDB

Wicked Twister was an inverted roller coaster located at Cedar Point amusement park in Sandusky, Ohio, United States. Designed by Werner Stengel, it was a second-generation, double-twisting Impulse model manufactured by Intamin. Wicked Twister opened as the tallest and fastest inverted coaster in the world on May 5, 2002. It was retired by the park on September 6, 2021, closed on September 7, and gave over 16 million rides during its lifetime.

== History ==
Construction on Wicked Twister began on October 15, 2001, shortly after Stadium Games, formerly known as the Aquarium, was razed. The new coaster was officially announced the following month, and its media day was held on May 2, 2002.

Built as the tallest and fastest double-twisting impulse coaster ever built, Wicked Twister actually opened as the tallest and fastest inverted coaster in the world on May 5, 2002. It held both records until the opening of Legendary Twin Dragon at Chongqing Sunac Land in China in 2021. Additional supports were added to the ride's structure for the 2003 season. Two yellow supports were added to each spike to connect the track to the top of the main support structure.

In Early 2018 season rumors started swirling around that Wicked Twister was going to be removed within a couple of years because of some buildings next to it being demolished.

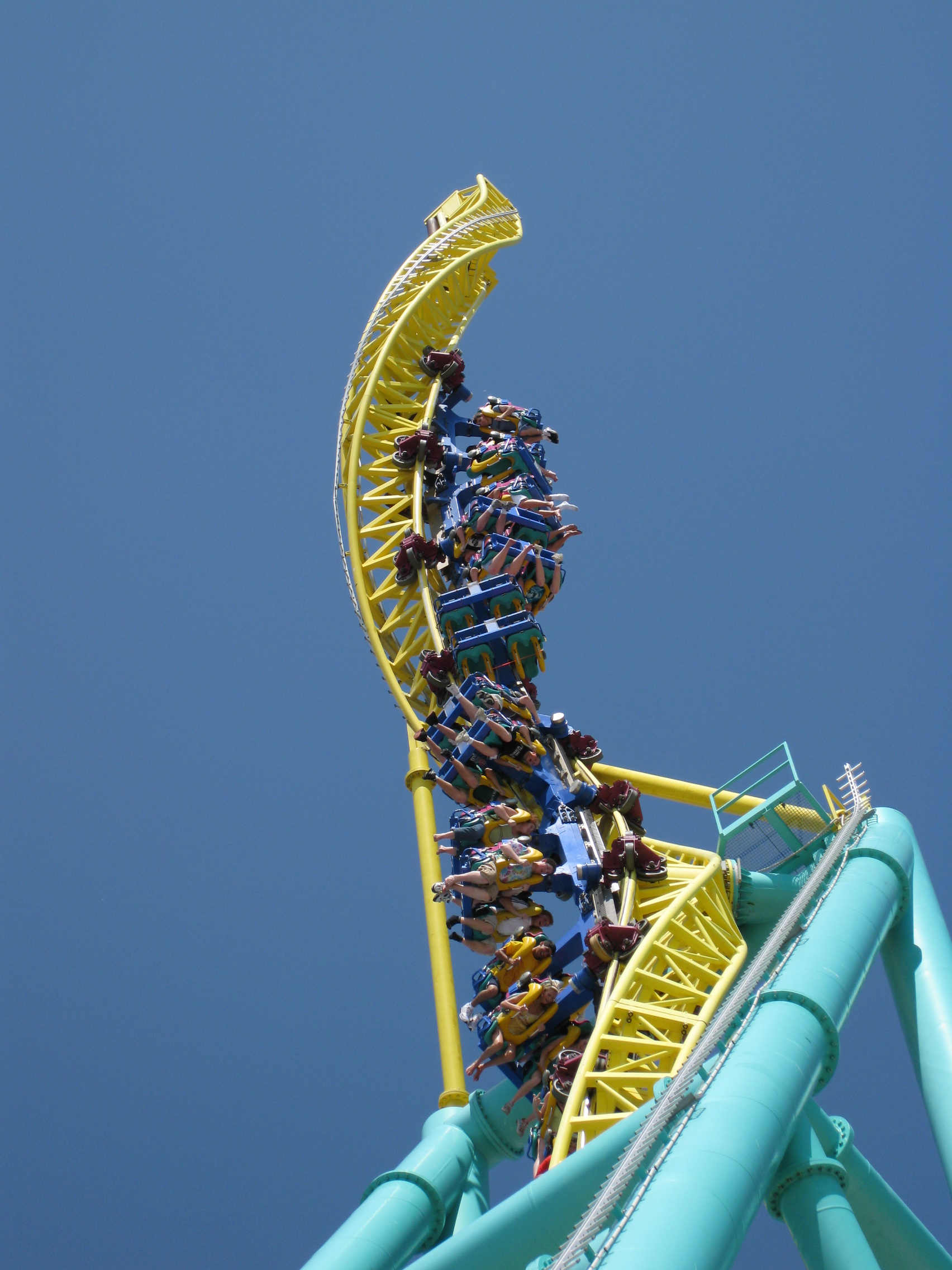
Wicked Twister cars toward the top of one of the spiral towers

In May 2021, park official Tony Clark implied in a series of tweets that Wicked Twister was going to be retired. This was confirmed on August 6, 2021, when Cedar Point officially announced the closure of Wicked Twister, scheduled for September 6, 2021. The ride then closed September 7, and on its last day of operation, park employees handed out "last launch" buttons to riders, sold limited-edition commemorative t-shirts, and gave away 16 "golden tickets" granting winners a spot on the last public train. Wicked Twister had accumulated over 16 million rides in 19 seasons of operation.

On November 3, 2021, Cedar Point announced that Wicked Twister would be demolished. Demolition and removal was completed on February 8, 2022. This would make it the first impulse coaster to be demolished since Linear Gale at Tokyo Dome City, which closed in 2010.

== Ride details ==
Wicked Twister consisted of two 215 feet (66 m) tall spikes. Both ends of the track were designed with 450-degree vertical twists, referred to as the front and rear towers, which differentiated Wicked Twister from other Impulse Coaster models from Intamin. The loading platform and linear induction motor (LIM) propulsion system sat between the two towers along a horizontal track section. The ride was built directly on Cedar Point Beach, and its entrance plaza was located in the former Aquarium location. The track was painted yellow with teal supports.

The ride featured one train that consisted of eight cars. Riders were arranged two across in two rows for a total of 32 riders. Wicked Twister's theme song was "The Winner" by The Crystal Method.

=== Layout ===
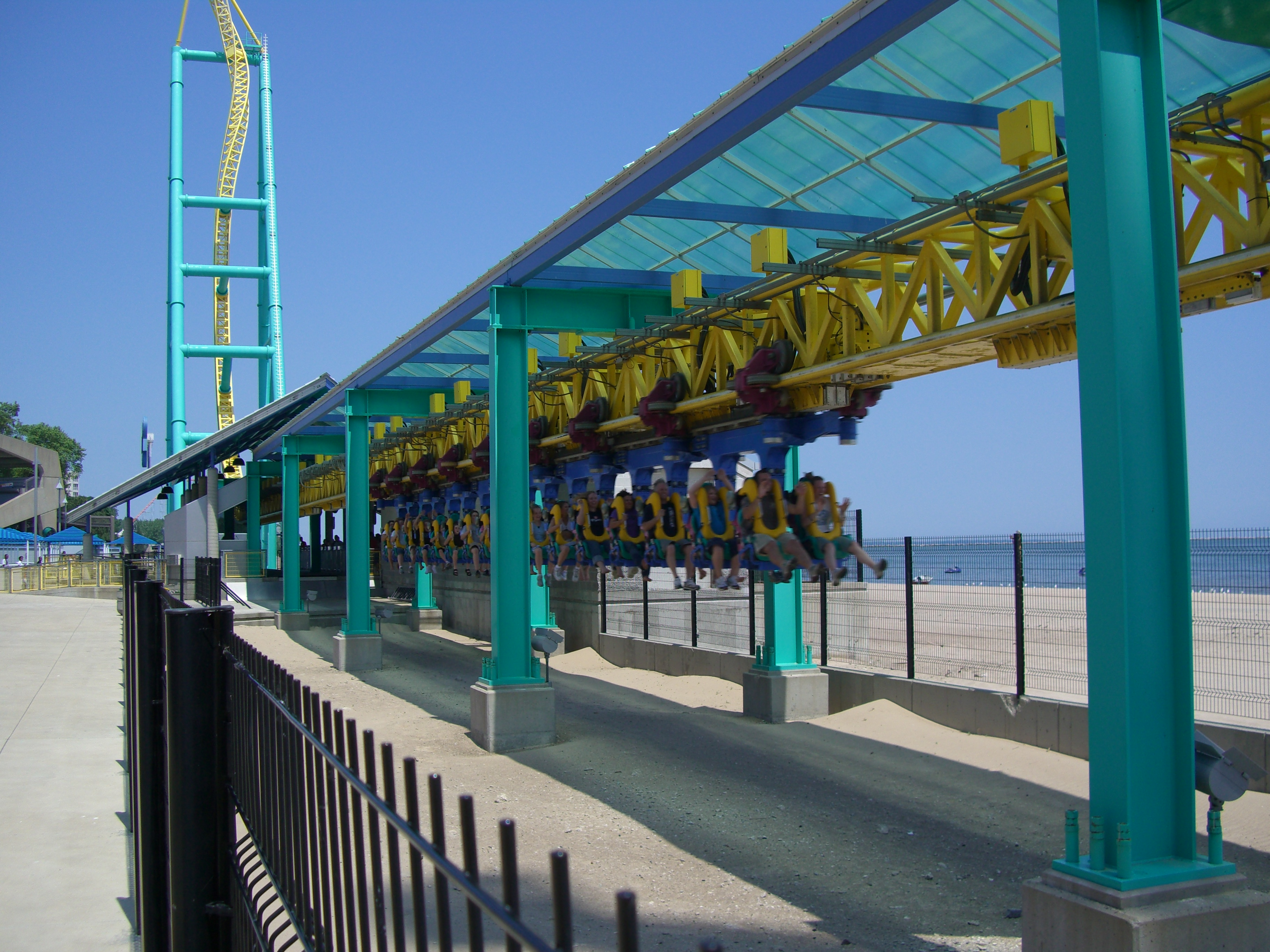
Train being launched

Linear induction motors propelled the train forward out of the station at 50 mph (80 km/h) during the first launch, which carried the train approximately halfway up the front tower. After coming to a stop, the train then fell and returned through the station, re-entering the LIM section and accelerating for a second launch to 63 mph (101 km/h) in the opposite direction. After climbing to its peak approximately halfway up the rear tower, the process would repeat a third time accelerating to 69 mph (111 km/h) and climbing to its highest point on the front tower.

A fourth and final LIM launch on the train's return through the station accelerated the train to its maximum speed of 72 mph (116 km/h), reaching a maximum height of 206 ft (63 m) up the rear tower. The train then made one more final pass through the station without any interaction from the LIM launch section and up the front spike. Subsequent passes through the station were met with the brakes being applied to slow the train slightly more each time until finally coming to rest.

== See also ==
- The Flash: Vertical Velocity – similar coaster located at Six Flags Great America
- Possessed – similar coaster located at Dorney Park & Wildwater Kingdom
- Steel Venom – similar coaster located at Valleyfair

Preceded by Alpengeist	World's tallest inverted roller coaster May 2002–February 2021	Succeeded by Legendary Twin Dragon
Preceded by Volcano, The Blast Coaster	World's fastest inverted roller coaster May 2002–February 2021	Succeeded by Legendary Twin Dragon
