= Steel Venom (Valleyfair) =

Roller coaster in Shakopee, Minnesota

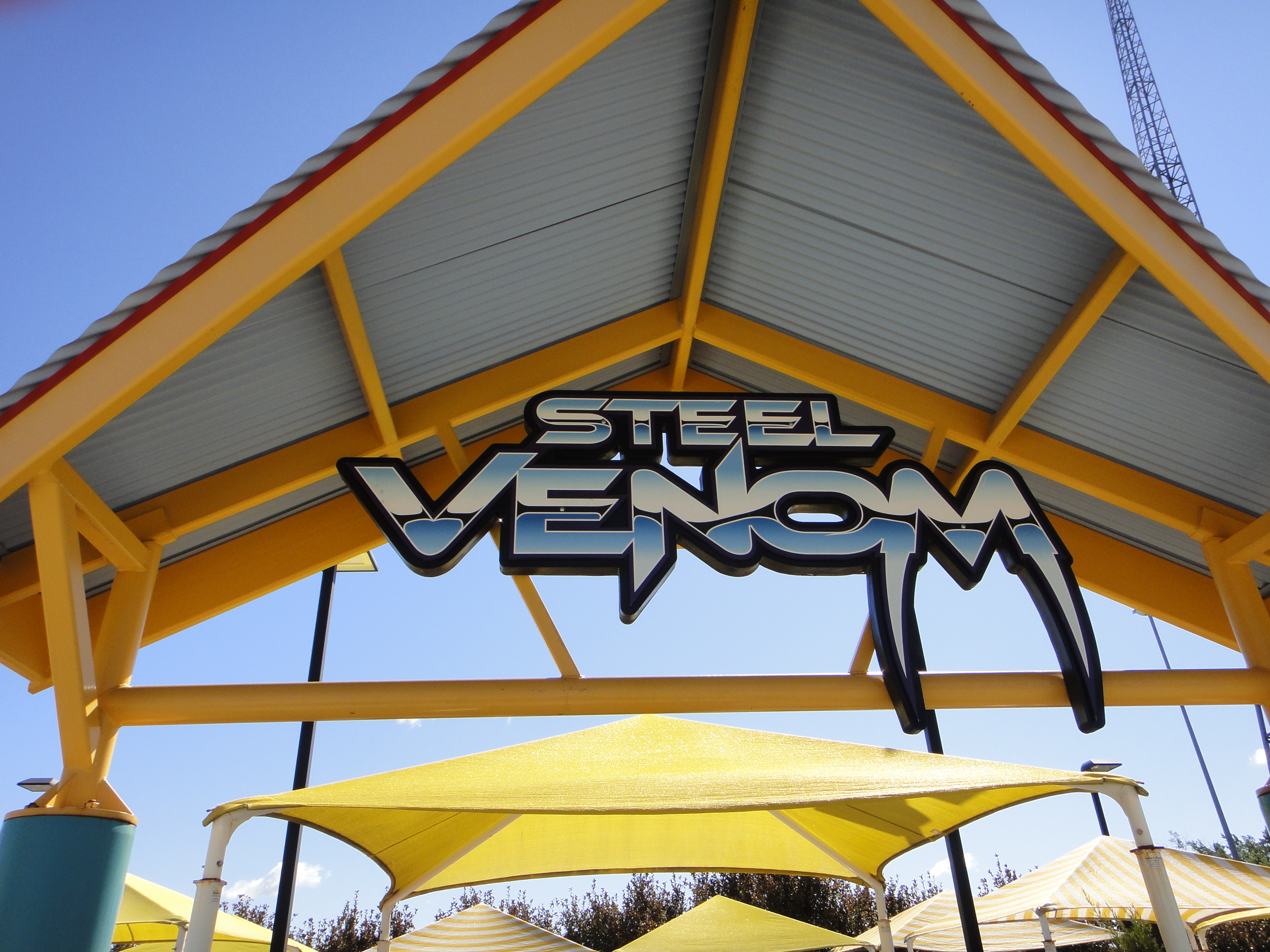
- Steel Venom's sign

Valleyfair
- Location: Valleyfair
- Coordinates: 44°47′52″N 93°27′06″W
- Status: Operating
- Opening date: May 17, 2003
- Cost: $8,500,000 USD

General statistics
- Type: Steel – Inverted – Launched
- Manufacturer: Intamin
- Model: Impulse Coaster
- Lift/launch system: LIM Launch Track
- Height: 185 ft (56 m)
- Drop: 175 ft (53 m)
- Length: 630 ft (190 m)
- Speed: 68 mph (109 km/h)
- Inversions: 0
- Max vertical angle: 90°
- Capacity: 950 riders per hour
- Height restriction: 52–78 in (132–198 cm)
- Trains: Single train with 7 cars. Riders are arranged 2 across in 2 rows for a total of 28 riders per train.
- Fast Lane available
- Steel Venom at RCDB

Steel Venom is an inverted launched roller coaster located at Valleyfair amusement park in Shakopee, Minnesota, United States. The Impulse Coaster model from Intamin, which opened in 2003, reaches a height of 185 feet (56 m) and a maximum speed of 68 mph (109 km/h).

== History ==
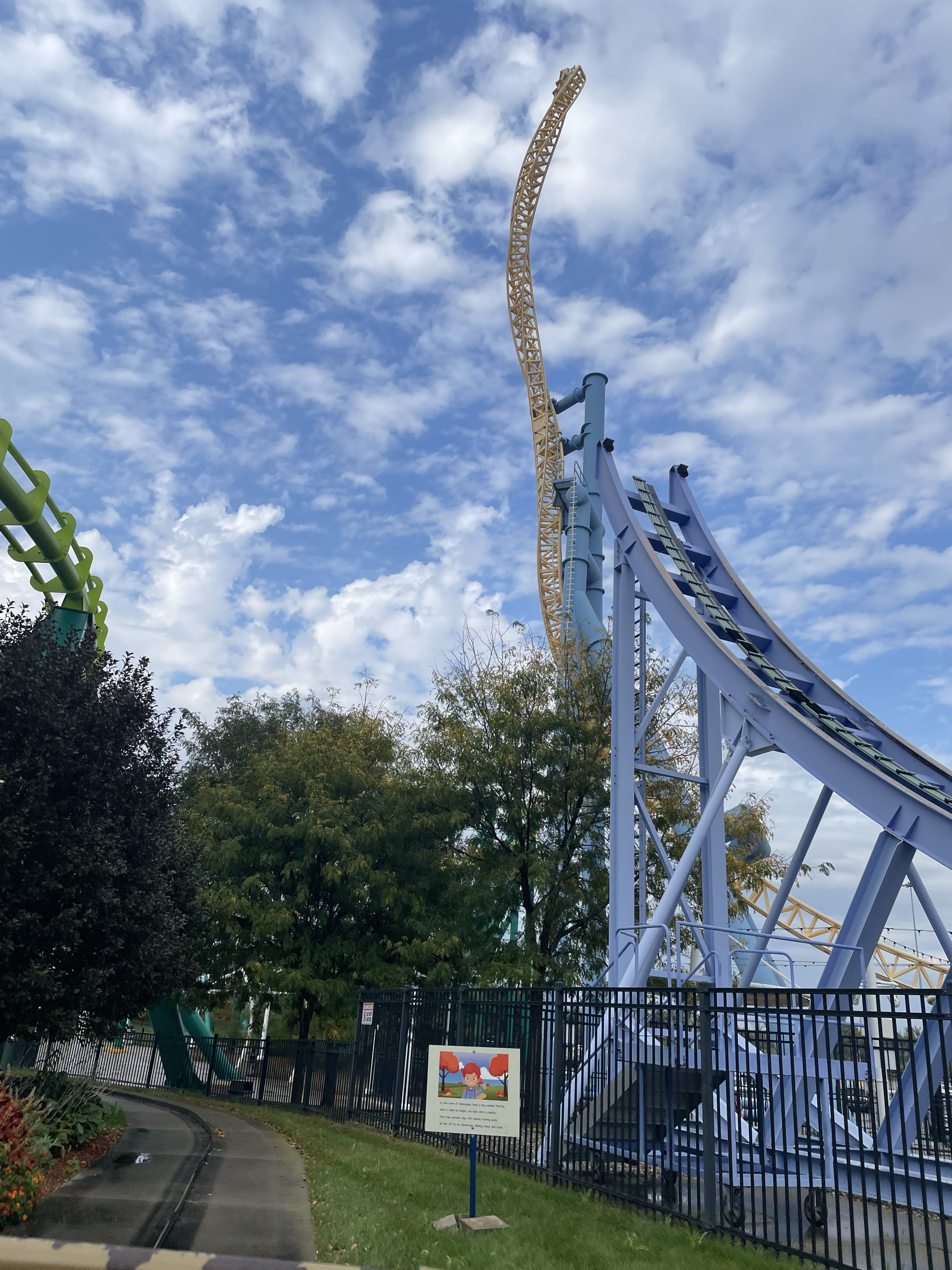
Steel Venom in 2025

Valleyfair unveiled Steel Venom in September 2002, a new roller coaster for the 2003 season manufactured by Intamin. It is an Impulse Coaster model, compact by design, and is also both Valleyfair’s and Minnesota’s first and only launch coaster. Steel Venom opened to the public on May 17, 2003.

== Ride description ==
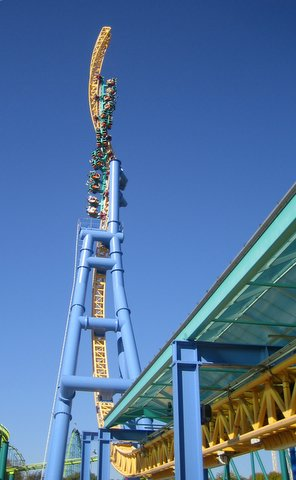
Steel Venom's front Spike

The coaster's single seven-car (28-passenger) train runs along a 200 m (656 ft) U-shaped track, incorporating two 185-foot (56 m) vertical spikes. The forward spike incorporates a twisted spiral, and the rearward spike provides a straight freefall. The 20 m (65 ft) train, propelled by linear induction motors (LIMs,) is accelerated in less than four seconds to 68 mph (109 km/h) toward the forward tower before dropping back down through the station house and up the rearward tower. A holding brake is incorporated on the rear straight tower and is able to suspend the train momentarily (usually on the final ascent during each ride) before dropping it back down to the station house.
