= Launched roller coaster =

Modern form of roller coaster

The launched roller coaster is a type of roller coaster that initiates a ride with high amounts of acceleration via one or a series of linear induction motors (LIM), linear synchronous motors (LSM), catapults, tires, chains, or other mechanisms employing hydraulic or pneumatic power, along a launch track. This mode of acceleration powers many of the fastest roller coasters in the world.

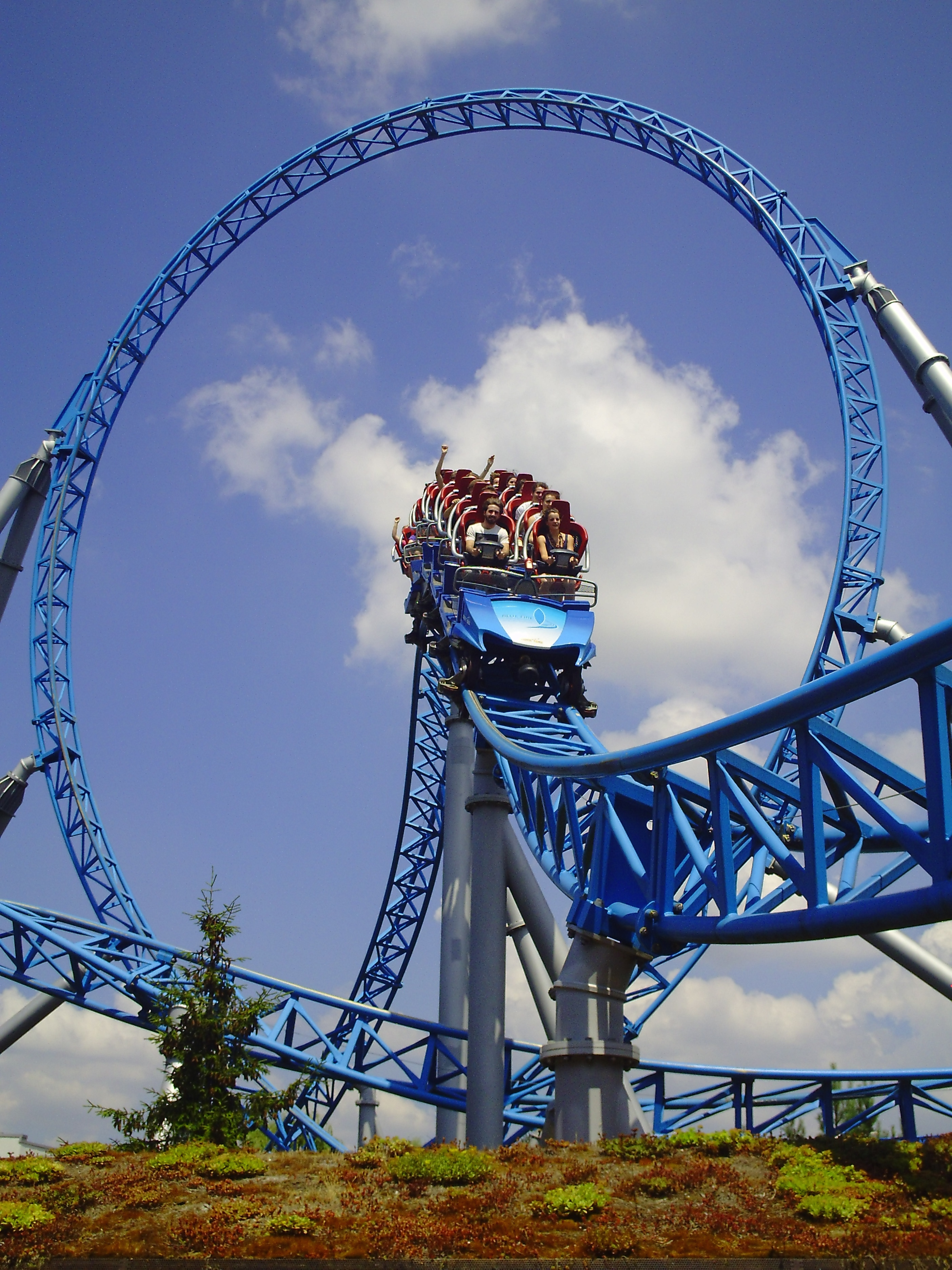
Blue Fire, a launched looping roller coaster at Europa-Park, Germany

== Electromagnetic ==
=== LIM / LSM ===
Linear induction motor (LIM) and linear synchronous motor (LSM) coasters use propulsion via electromagnets, which utilize large amounts of electricity to propel the coaster train along its track into the ride elements (e.g. inversions, twists, turns and short drops). There are many design companies managing these types of rides such as Vekoma, Intamin, Gerstlauer, Premier Rides, Maurer, Zierer, Mack Rides, Bolliger & Mabillard, Rocky Mountain Construction and S&S Worldwide. Both Rocky Mountain Construction and Bolliger & Mabillard established their first LSM launched coasters recently with the RMC Topper Track Coaster, Lightning Rod, at Dollywood, and B&M's wingrider, Thunderbird, at HolidayWorld.

An example of an LSM launched roller coaster is Maverick at Cedar Point in Sandusky, Ohio.

These launch systems transfer electricity through a motor on the roller coaster's track so that it controls the speed at which it will urge the cars and train either forward or backward on a segment. LIMs are mainly used in Premier Rides roller coasters and Intamin impulse coasters. However, LIMs can also be used for general transport, such as the Tomorrowland Transit Authority PeopleMover in Magic Kingdom or monorail and maglev trains.

== Fluid pressure ==
=== Hydraulic fluid ===
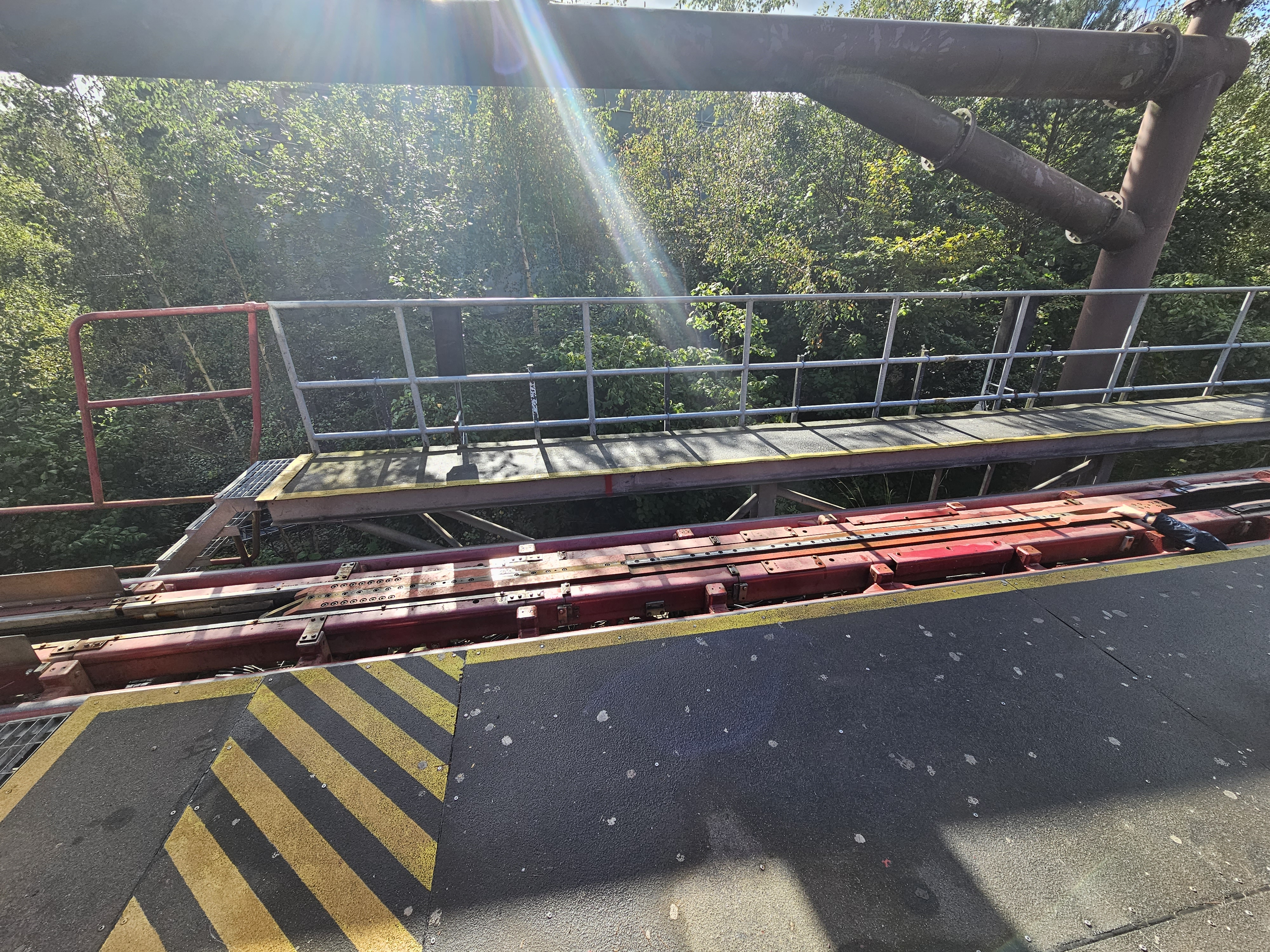
The catch-car of the Rita roller coaster at Alton Towers

Hydraulic-launched roller coasters, pioneered by Swiss manufacturer Intamin, give the riders greater acceleration with improved smoothness over the electromagnetic and catapult launch mechanisms. The acceleration from a hydraulic launch is greatest at the beginning and dies off rapidly, but the acceleration from a LIM/LSM launch remains fairly constant throughout the duration of the launch.

The core of the system involves powerful hydraulic pumps, usually eight, that are each capable of producing approximately 500 horsepower (373 kW). In Kingda Ka's configuration, the system was able to produce a peak power of up to 20,800 hp (15.5 MW) for each launch. Hydraulic fluid is pumped into several different hydraulic accumulators – energy storing devices – containing two compartments that are separated by a piston. As the incompressible hydraulic fluid is pumped into one compartment, nitrogen in the other compartment is compressed. At launch, the fluid under pressure from the accumulators is used to drive a number of hydraulic motors (commonly 16 or 32), which spin a large winch drum that rewinds a cable attached to the lead car of the train, called the catch-car, in a matter of seconds. The cable runs under the launch track, and the catch-car moves along a groove in the track's center.

The motor is positioned at the opposite end of the catch-car on the launch track. While the train inches forward into a ready position, the pusher mechanism moves back from the motor toward the train. Once the pusher connects, the anti-rollback braking system drops beneath the track, giving the train the green light to be launched.

The first hydraulic launch coaster was Xcelerator reaching 82 mph (132 km/h) in 2.3 seconds. Kingda Ka at Six Flags Great Adventure, was capable of reaching 128 mph (206 km/h) in 3.5 seconds. The current second and former fastest roller coaster in the world, Formula Rossa, reaches 149 mph (240 km/h) in 4 seconds using the hydraulic method.

Accelerator Coasters manufactured by Intamin commonly place a top hat element after the launch, which is a hill in the shape of a tower with a 90-degree ascent and 90-degree drop. Trains enter and exit this element in opposite directions. Top Thrill Dragster, built in 2003, includes this element followed by a brake run, while Kingda Ka, built in 2005, adds a 129 ft (39 m) airtime hill before the final brake run. Some hydraulic coaster layouts omit the top hat element altogether. Another manufacturer, Vekoma, began producing hydraulic-launched coasters in 2004 with the opening of Booster Bike at Toverland in the Netherlands, reaching speeds up to 47 mph (76 km/h).

=== Pneumatic (compressed air) ===
Using the same type of system as a hydraulic launch, a pneumatic launch uses compressed air to launch the vehicle. The technology was developed by S&S as the Thrust Air 2000 model. The first coaster of this type was the Hypersonic XLC, opened at Kings Dominion in Doswell, Virginia, USA in 2001. This coaster closed in 2007. Another incarnation, the Ring Racer, was open for only 4 days. Compressed air launches are able to provide more acceleration than traditional pneumatic launches, with Do-Dodonpa at Fuji-Q Highland in Japan having held the acceleration record from when it opened as Dodonpa in 2001 until its closure in 2024, launching passengers from 0 to 112 mph (180 km/h) in 1.56 seconds (this record is now held by Maxx Force at Six Flags Great America, USA). S&S has brought back pneumatic launches in China with OCT Thrust SSC1000 and Bullet Coaster at Happy Valley Wuhan and Happy Valley Shenzhen respectively. Maxx Force at Six Flags Great America marked the return of pneumatic launches in the United States.

== Other styles ==
=== Eddy current launcher (LEM) ===
Magnets are placed under the cars and a series of flywheels coupled to aluminum discs is in the launch zone: there is no contact between the two. The system can be used also for speed up intermediate launchers, and for braking, with static aluminum blades, at the end of the ride. Thanks to the energy stored in the flywheels, the power demand for launching is flat. Two operating examples of this technique are the Drifter at Sochi Park in the Sochi Olimpic Park and at FunWorks, Abu Dhabi (manufacturer I.E.Park)

=== Catapult ===
In the catapult launch, a dropped weight winds a cable to pull the train until it accelerates to its full speed. Dropped weights were used in early installations of Shuttle Loop.

These rides are often not very tall, and usually achieve speeds of 60 mph (96 km/h).

=== Flywheel ===
Flywheel launches are used on some Anton Schwarzkopf designed shuttle loop coasters and Zamperla Motocoasters. A large flywheel is spun at high speeds and is attached to a cable that propels the train forward.

=== Electric motor and spring tension ===
Arrow Dynamics' Launched Loop coasters, which were popular in the 1970s and 1980s, use a powerful electric motor and tensioned springs to propel a launch car forward. The launch car pushes the train outward to a drop, and then returns to its position. After the train reaches the opposite platform, another catch car works the same way. An example of this is Revolution (Blackpool Pleasure Beach).

=== Friction wheels ===
Another type of launch is by friction wheels. The launch track consists of a series of horizontal tires that pinch the brake fins on the underside of the train. One example of this is the Incredible Hulk Coaster at Universal's Islands of Adventure.

== Examples ==
=== Australia ===
- Jet Rescue (Sea World)
- Motocoaster (Dreamworld)
- Steel Taipan (Dreamworld)
- Surfrider (Wet'n'Wild Gold Coast)
- Superman Escape (Warner Bros. Movie World)
- Tower of Terror II (Dreamworld) (removed)

=== Belgium ===
- Anubis The Ride (Plopsaland)
- Fury (Bobbejaanland)
- Psyké Underground (Walibi Belgium)
- Pulsar (Walibi Belgium)
- The Ride to Happiness (Plopsaland)

=== Brazil ===
- Katapul (Hopi Hari)

=== Canada ===
- AlpenFury (Canada's Wonderland)
- Back Lot Stunt Coaster (Canada's Wonderland)
- ThunderVolt (Playland)

=== China ===
- Battle of Blue Fire (Quancheng Euro Park)
- Decepticoaster (Universal Studios Beijing)
- Legendary Twin Dragon (Chongqing Sunac Land)
- Light Of Revenge (Happy Valley Nanjing)
- Hurricane Roller Coaster (Suzhou Amusement Land Forest World)
- OCT Thrust SSC1000 (Happy Valley Wuhan)
- RC Racer (Shanghai Disneyland)
- Tron Lightcycle Power Run (Shanghai Disneyland)

=== Denmark ===
- Juvelen (Djurs Sommerland)

=== Finland ===
- Half Pipe Coaster (Särkänniemi) (defunct)
- Motogee (Särkänniemi)
- Taiga (Linnanmäki)
- Junker (PowerPark)

=== France ===
- Toutatis (Parc Astérix)
- Objectif Mars (Futuroscope)
- RC Racer (Disney Adventure World)
- Avengers Assemble: Flight Force (Disney Adventure World)
- Star Wars Hyperspace Mountain (Disneyland Paris)

=== Germany ===
- Blue Fire Megacoaster (Europa-Park)
- Desert Race (Heide Park)
- Flucht von Novgorod (Hansa-Park)
- F.L.Y. (Phantasialand)
- Karacho (Erlebnispark Tripsdrill)
- Movie Park Studio Tour (Movie Park Germany)
- ring°racer (Nürburgring) (defunct)
- Sky Scream (Holiday Park)
- Star Trek: Operation Enterprise (Movie Park Germany)
- Taron (Phantasialand)
- Voltron Nevera (Europa-Park)

=== Hong Kong ===
- RC Racer (Hong Kong Disneyland)

=== Italy ===
- ISpeed (Mirabilandia)
- Shock (Rainbow MagicLand)

=== Japan ===
- Do-Dodonpa (Fuji-Q Highland) (Removed)
- Takabisha (Fuji-Q Highland)
- Shuttle Loop (Nagashima Spa Land)

=== Netherlands ===
- Booster Bike (Amusement Park Toverland)
- Formule X (Drievliet)
- Gold Rush (Slagharen)
- Xpress: Platform 13 (Walibi Holland)

=== Norway ===
- Speed Monster (Tusenfryd)

=== Poland ===
- Abyssus (Energylandia)
- Formuła (Energylandia)

=== Saudi Arabia ===
- Falcons Flight (Six Flags Qiddiya City)
- Spitfire (Six Flags Qiddiya City)

=== Singapore ===
- Battlestar Galactica: Human vs. Cylon (Universal Studios Singapore)

=== South Africa ===
- Golden Loop (Gold Reef City)

=== Spain ===
- Batman: Gotham City Escape (Parque Warner Madrid)
- Furius Baco (Port Aventura's Park)
- Red Force (Ferrari Land)
- Uncharted: El Enigma de Penitence (Port Aventura's Park)

=== Sweden ===
- Helix (Liseberg)
- Kanonen (Liseberg) (removed)

=== UAE ===
- Madagascar Mad Pursuit (Motiongate)
- Formula Rossa (Ferrari World)
- Turbo Track (Ferrari World)

=== UK ===
- Revolution (Blackpool Pleasure Beach)
- Rita (Alton Towers)
- Icon (Blackpool Pleasure Beach)
- Velocity (Flamingo Land)
- Stealth (Thorpe Park)
- Mandrill Mayhem (Chessington)

=== USA ===
- Avatar Airbender (Nickelodeon Universe Mall of America)
- Backlot Stunt Coaster (Kings Dominion) (Kings Island) (Canada's Wonderland)
- Bakunawa (Six Flags Great Adventure)
- Cheetah Hunt (Busch Gardens Tampa Bay)
- Copperhead Strike (Carowinds)
- DarKoaster: Escape The Storm (Busch Gardens Williamsburg)
- Flight of Fear (Kings Dominion) (Kings Island)
- Full Throttle (Six Flags Magic Mountain)
- Guardians of the Galaxy: Cosmic Rewind (Epcot)
- Half Pipe Coaster (Elitch Gardens)
- Harry Potter and the Escape from Gringotts (Universal Studios Florida)
- Hagrid's Magical Creatures Motorbike Adventure (Universal Islands of Adventure)
- Ice Breaker (SeaWorld Orlando)
- Incredible Hulk Coaster (Universal Islands of Adventure)
- Incredicoaster (Disney California Adventure Park)
- Lightning Rod (Dollywood)
- Maverick (Cedar Point)
- Maxx Force (Six Flags Great America)
- Monsters, Inc. Door Coaster (Disney's Hollywood Studios)
- Montezooma's Revenge (Knott's Berry Farm)
- Mr. Freeze (Six Flags Over Texas) (Six Flags St. Louis)
- Pantheon (Busch Gardens Williamsburg)
- Penguin Trek (SeaWorld Orlando)
- Poltergeist (Six Flags Fiesta Texas)
- Possessed (Dorney Park & Wildwater Kingdom)
- Revenge of the Mummy: The Ride (Universal Studios Florida)
- Rock 'n' Roller Coaster (Disney's Hollywood Studios)
- Sandy's Blasting Bronco (Nickelodeon Universe American Dream)
- Slinky Dog Dash (Disney's Hollywood Studios)
- Stardust Racers (Universal Epic Universe)
- Steel Venom (Valleyfair)
- Storm Runner (Hersheypark)
- Superman: Escape from Krypton (Six Flags Magic Mountain)
- Tempesto (Busch Gardens Williamsburg)
- The Flash: Vertical Velocity (Six Flags Great America)
- Timmy's Half Pipe Havoc (Nickelodeon Universe American Dream)
- Tigris (Busch Gardens Tampa Bay)
- Top Thrill Dragster (Cedar Point)(Reimagined into Top Thrill 2)
- Top Thrill 2 (Cedar Point)
- Tron Lightcycle Power Run (Magic Kingdom)
- VelociCoaster (Universal Islands of Adventure)
- Verbolten (Busch Gardens Williamsburg)
- Volcano (Kings Dominion)(Removed)
- Wave Breaker: The Rescue Coaster (SeaWorld San Antonio)
- West Coast Racers (Six Flags Magic Mountain)
- Wicked Twister (Cedar Point)(Removed)
- Xcelerator (Knott's Berry Farm)
