= The Gold Coaster =

Steel roller coaster at Dreamworld

- Previously known as : Big Dipper (1995–2001); Cyclone (2001–2015); Hot Wheels SideWinder (2015–2020)
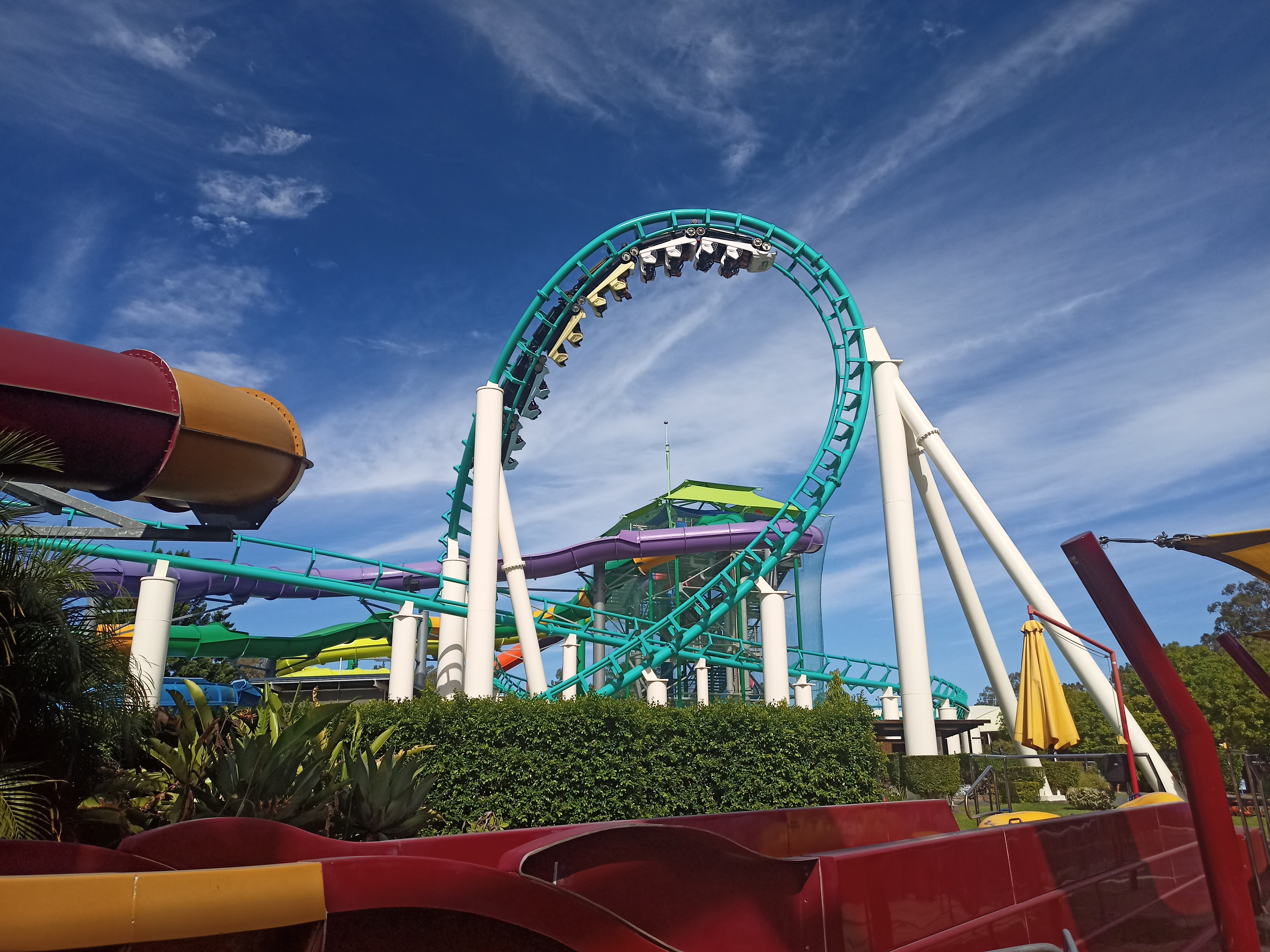
- A view of The Gold Coaster's Reversed Sidewinder element from WhiteWater World

Dreamworld
- Park section: Ocean Parade
- Coordinates: 27°51′55″S 153°18′55.5″E
- Status: Operating
- Opening date: 26 December 2001
- Cost: A$5,500,000

Luna Park Sydney
- Coordinates: 33.847482°S 151.209964°E
- Status: Removed
- Opening date: 21 January 1995
- Closing date: 27 January 2001
- Cost: A$8,000,000

General statistics
- Type: Steel
- Manufacturer: Arrow Dynamics
- Lift/launch system: Chain lift hill
- Height: 40 m (130 ft)
- Length: 900 m (3,000 ft)
- Speed: 85 km/h (53 mph)
- Inversions: 2
- Capacity: 400 riders per hour
- G-force: 3
- Height restriction: 120–205 cm (3 ft 11 in – 6 ft 9 in)
- Trains: Single train with 6 cars; riders arranged 2 across in 2 rows for a total of 24 riders per train
- Theme: Circa 1970s Gold Coast
- Website: Official website
- Ride Express available
- The Gold Coaster at RCDB

The Gold Coaster is a steel roller coaster operating at Dreamworld. Designed by Arrow Dynamics and built in Melbourne by Able Leisure Pty. Ltd, the ride originally operated at Luna Park Sydney in 1995 as Big Dipper before being sold and relocated to Dreamworld on the Gold Coast in 2001. When it was brought to Dreamworld, the ride was the first roller coaster to be opened on the Gold Coast since 1997. The ride was named Cyclone from 2001 until 2015 when it was refurbished and renamed Hot Wheels SideWinder as part of the new Motorsport Experience themed land from 2015 to 2020. The ride received its current name after it reopened from refurbishment in December 2020.

== History ==
=== Construction ===
The steel roller coaster, designed by Arrow Dynamics, was constructed by Able Leisure Pty Ltd in Newport, Victoria at a cost of A$8,000,000 during the 1994 redevelopment of Luna Park Sydney. Construction of the ride used over 1,000 tons of steel and 15,000 sets of nuts and bolts.

=== Luna Park era ===
The ride first opened as Big Dipper at Luna Park Sydney on 21 January 1995. The ride was named and themed after a previous attraction at the park, and was at the time the tallest roller coaster in the Southern Hemisphere.

The new roller coaster became a point of contention with residents, and was cited as the main example of the noise pollution generated by the amusement park. After appeals to various courts by both the "resident action group" and the park's new owners, it was decreed that the roller coaster could only operate at certain times, and under strict conditions. These conditions caused major shareholder Wittingslow Amusements to consider 'walking out' on the operating company. The park's administration was doubtful of Luna Park's survival under the restrictions, and was proven correct when the park was forced to close in February 1996.

Following the 1996 closure, Luna Park was able to operate on several special, court-allowed occasions for charity-supporting events or filming. In July 1999, it was announced that Metro Edgley would acquire the lease to Luna Park. The company was to redevelop the park, planning to remove Big Dipper and replace it with a concert venue.

Luna Park was permitted to open for the final time on weekends and school holidays from March 2000 to January 2001. The Big Dipper was allowed to operate only on Saturdays and select Friday evenings during this period. The ride's final day of operation was 27 January 2001.

=== Relocation to Dreamworld ===
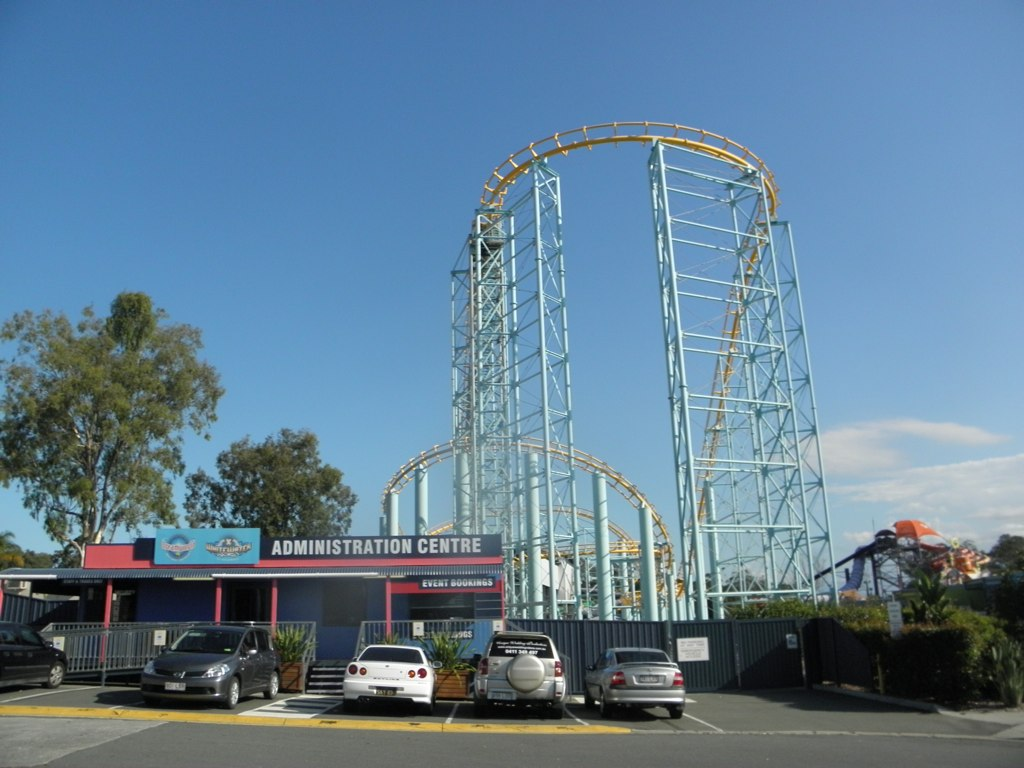
A view of the roller coaster from the Dreamworld and WhiteWater World administration office.

The ride was purchased in May 2001 by Macquarie Leisure Trust, the owners of Dreamworld, for A$3 million. A further A$2.5 million was spent to relocate, install and modify the roller coaster, as well as to develop the roller coaster's new theme. Several of the supports needed modifications to make them rest on the ground because they were originally located on top of a single story building. It took 136 trucks to carry the track from Luna Park Sydney to Dreamworld.

The ride reopened as the Cyclone at its new location in Dreamworld on 26 December 2001, in a ceremony dedicated by Peter Beattie and Merri Rose MPs. Dreamworld's chief executive, Tony Braxton-Smith, stated the ride was similar to being in an actual cyclone: "the name Cyclone fits the ride perfectly with lots of nail-biting twists and hair-raising turns to simulate being caught in a real cyclone". The intention of the ride's spiral queue design was to occupy patrons through both visual and physical stimuli such as theatrical lighting and shaking floors. At a point prior to 2008, the queue line was switched with the exit ramp resulting in patrons lining up on the ramp that wraps around the building, and exiting through the deactivated interior queue.

=== 2015 refurbishment ===
The Cyclone closed on 12 October 2015 for a refurbishment to become part of a new Motorsport Experience precinct at Dreamworld. As part of the upgrades, the ride was fitted with a new train built by Vekoma that featured onboard audio and renamed Hot Wheels SideWinder. The Motorsport Experience precinct opened on 26 December 2015 with the refurbished roller coaster and V8 Supercars RedLine simulators, as well as a collection of Peter Brock's cars in Brock's Garage.

=== 2020 refurbishment ===
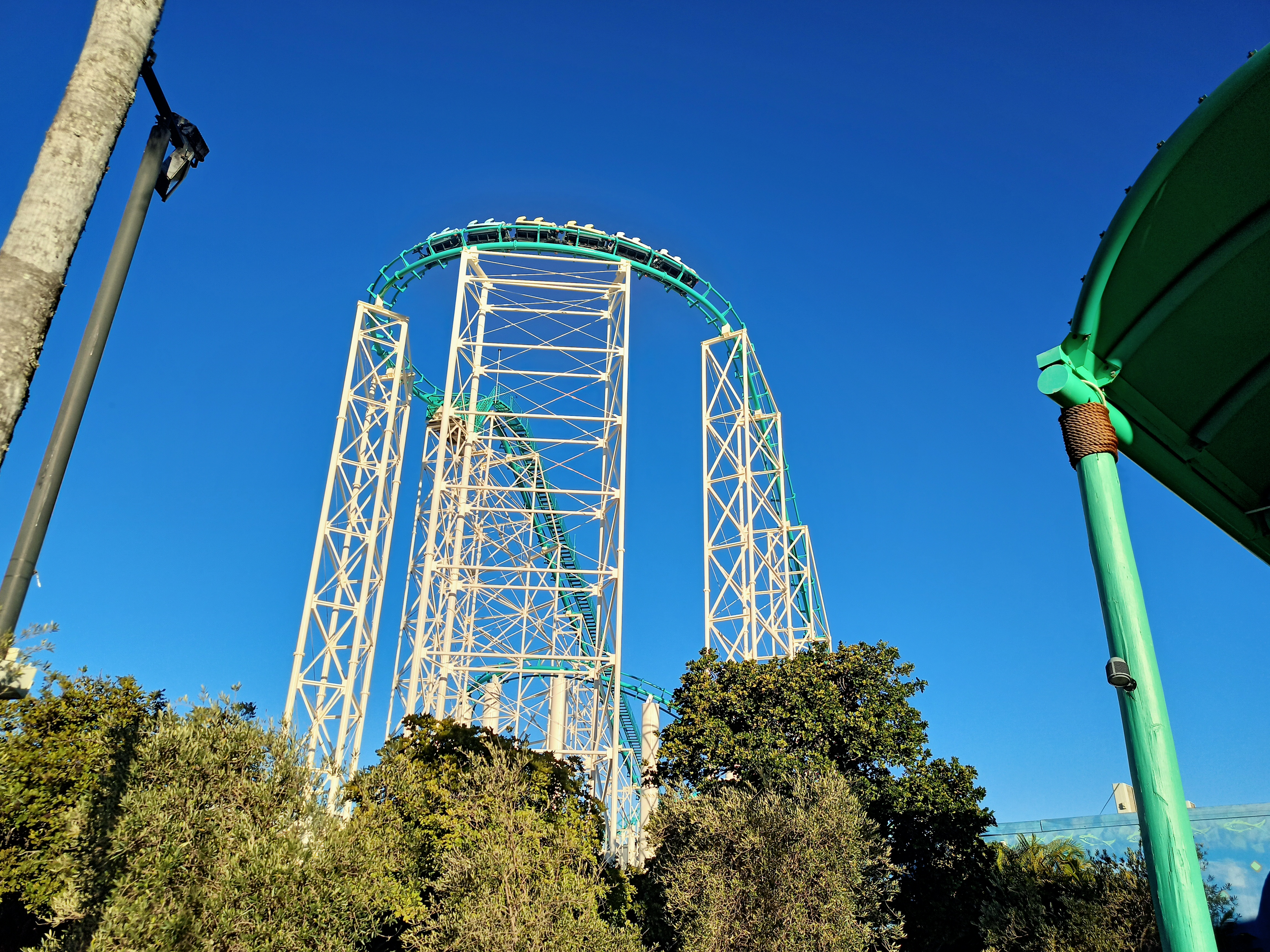
The refurbishment included a repaint of the roller coaster

In February 2020, Dreamworld announced that the Hot Wheels Sidewinder would be given a rebranding and a refurbishment. This came alongside the retirement of the Rocky Hollow Log Ride and a refurbishment for ABC Kids World. Soon after the announcement, repainting commenced on the coaster with a new colour scheme. The tracks were painted aqua blue while the supports were painted white. The coaster's new name and theme were officially announced on the morning of 20 December 2020. The ride reopened to the public later that day with a new colour scheme on both the tracks and trains along with a retheme from Hot Wheels to a circa 1970s Gold Coast theme.

== Characteristics ==
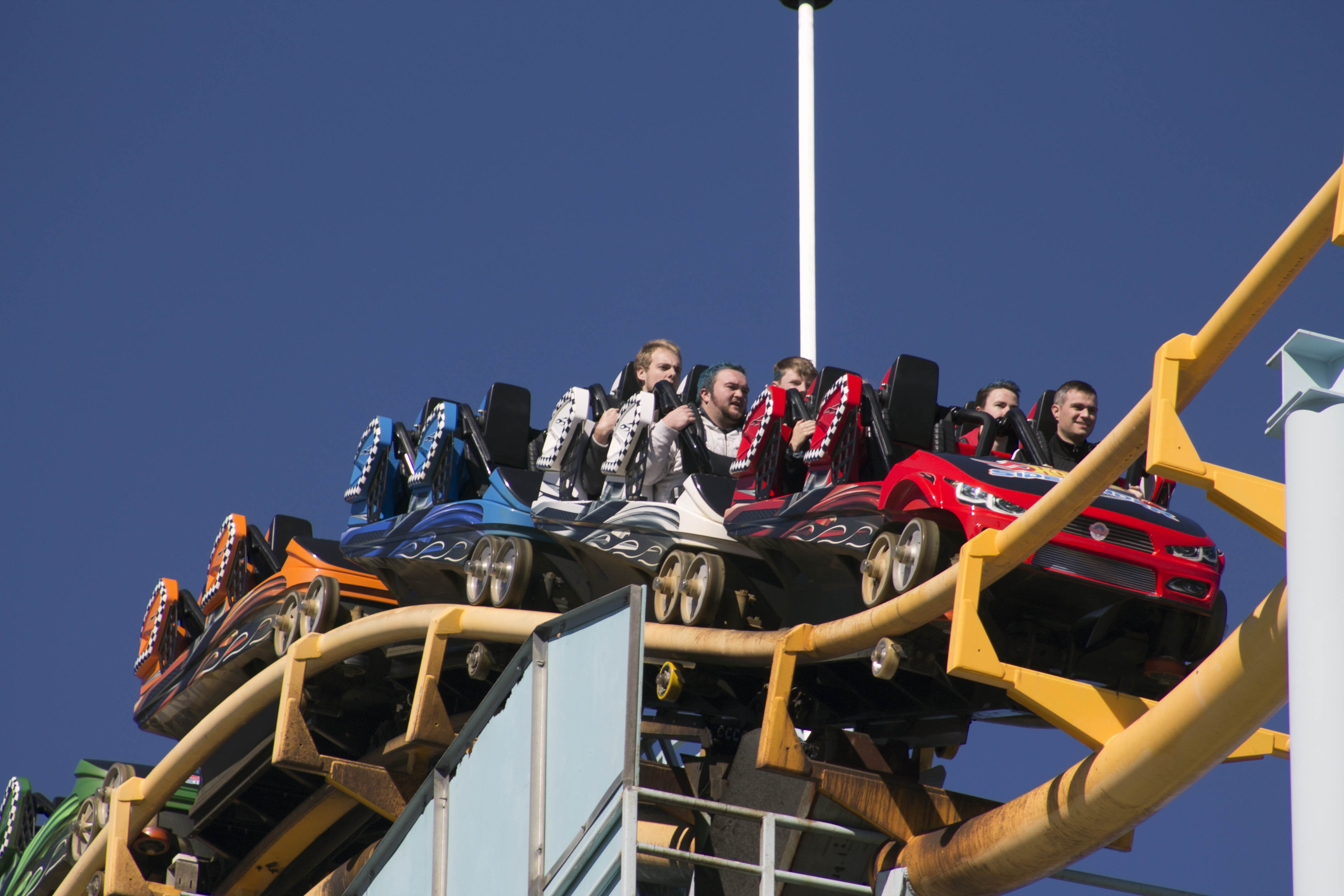
The Gold Coaster's (pictured as Hot Wheels SideWinder) train built by Vekoma at the top of the lift hill

The Gold Coaster is one of Dreamworld's seven thrill rides alongside The Claw, The Giant Drop, Mick Doohan's Motocoaster, Pandamonium, Steel Taipan and Tail Spin. At 40 metres (130 ft) high, The Gold Coaster was the Southern Hemisphere's tallest roller coaster until 2011 when the park opened BuzzSaw.

The Gold Coaster is 900-metre (3,000 ft) long, making it the second longest roller coaster in Australia at the time of opening (before Thunderbolt. The ride is still one of the longest roller coaster in Australia. The ride reaches a top speed of 85 kilometres (53 mi) and a top acceleration of 3.0 g (31 m/s²) during the course of the two-minute ride.

=== Ride Vehicle ===
The Gold Coaster consists of a single six-car train which seats 24 passengers (4 passengers per car). The original trains used from 1996 to 2015 were built by Arrow Dynamics, however after the 2015 refurbishment, new trains built by Vekoma were introduced. During the Hot Wheels era, the trains were themed to race cars. Since 2020, the trains are currently themed to a 1970s vintage car.

== Ride experience ==
=== Queue ===
Riders queue inside a spiral building with a variety of circa 1970s Gold Coast theming. The entrance of the spiral building is themed to a motel. Riders then enter a hallway decorated with pastel colours before entering a room with blue LED lights. The room is decorated with surfboards and the ride's logo. Riders are then lead into the ride's station which is themed to a garage.

=== Ride ===
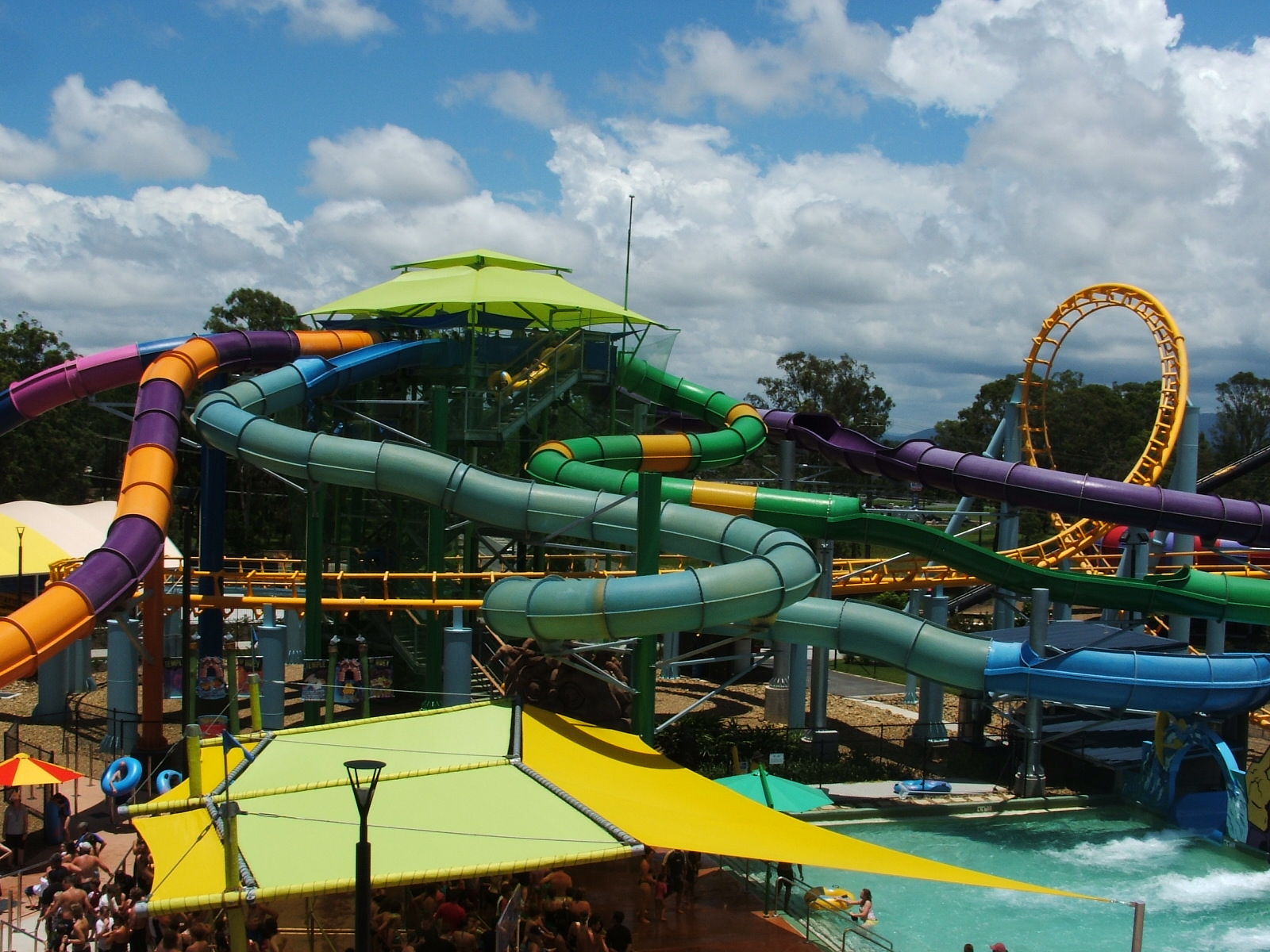
The ride's track interacting with slides at WhiteWater World

After exiting the station, the vehicle does a sharp turn left onto the chain lift hill. The ride then reaches its highest point before a pre-drop, turning left and descending down the main drop. Riders ascend into a sweeping left hand turn, closely followed by a straight track and a second left hand turn. The ride's train heads close to ground level, traversing a helix, followed by two inversions – a reverse sidewinder followed by a vertical loop. The ride ascends into a short straight track, before making a sharp turn to the right and entering the final brakes. As the ride has aged, the experience for the rider has become more rough than when the ride was new.

=== Exit ===
Riders are to exit through a staircase which leads to underneath the station before going up another staircase to the top of the spiral building. Guests are then to exit down the ramp in the spiral building. Guests are then to exit through the Shaka Shack gift shop. The gift shop contains souvenirs and ride photos available for purchase.

== Fiscal results ==
In the first 6 months of the ride's release in December 2001, more than half of all visitors to Dreamworld rode the Cyclone putting its popularity above The Giant Drop and Tower of Terror, but still lagging behind Thunder River Rapids Ride and Rocky Hollow Log Ride according to Macquarie Leisure Trust, owners of Dreamworld. They clarify: "the Thunder River Rapids and the Log Ride remain the most popular attractions in the park due to their large capacity and ride frequency".

The Trust concluded that the Cyclone's success, along with the impact of social changes in Australian culture were able to offset the negative impact of the Ansett collapse and increase attendance by 6.9% and total revenue by 13.3%. They did not attribute a specific portion of this to the Cyclone itself.

== Popular culture ==
The Gold Coaster was featured on the opening sequences of Big Brother Australia in 2002 (as Cyclone).
