= Gold Rush Country =

Themed land at the Dreamworld theme park

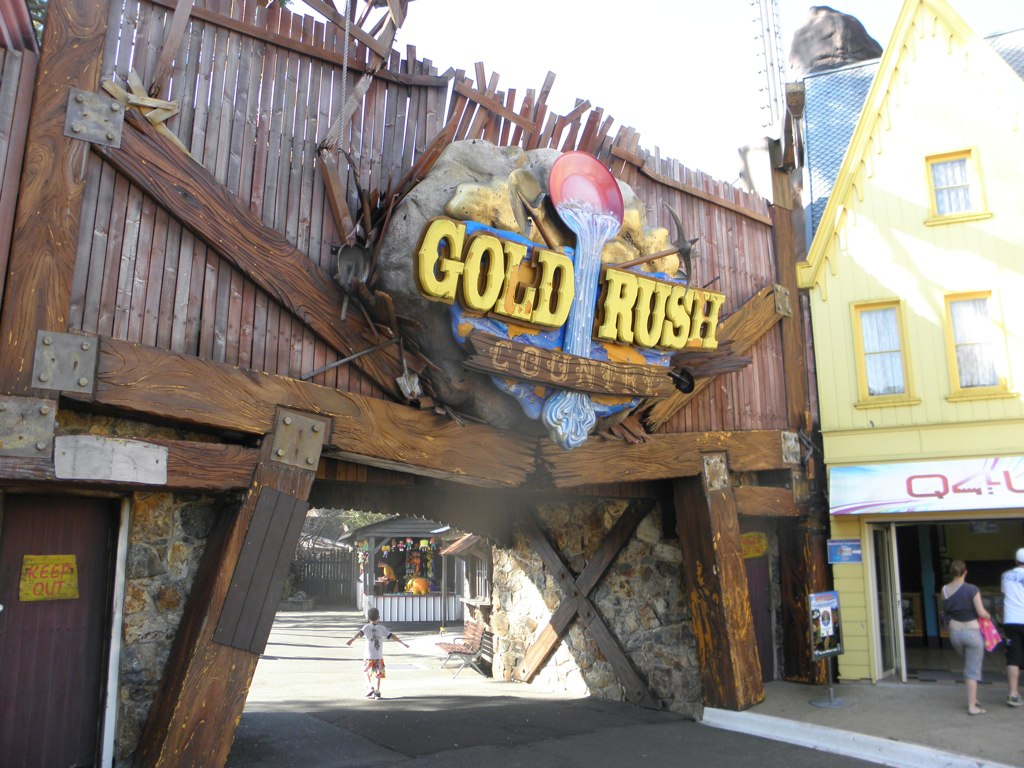
- The entrance to Gold Rush Country before saw added for Buzz Saw
- Interactive map of Gold Rush Country
- Coordinates: 27.862394°S 153.315572°E
- Status: Operating
- Opened: 11 December 1986
- Theme: Australian gold rush town

Attractions
- Total: 3
- Roller coasters: 1
- Other rides: 2

Dreamworld

The Gold Rush Country (a.k.a. Town of Gold Rush or simply Gold Rush) is a themed land at the Dreamworld theme park on the Gold Coast, Queensland, Australia.

== History ==
The Gold Rush Country opened on 11 December 1986. The area featured the Eureka Mountain Mine Ride and the Thunder River Rapids Ride. In 2006, the Eureka Mountain Mine Ride was decommissioned due to safety concerns. In the middle of 2011, Gold Rush Country was refurbished with shops being relocated around the area in preparation for its conversion into the Town of Gold Rush. On 17 September 2011, Gold Rush Country officially reopened as the Town of Gold Rush to match BuzzSaw's backstory. The Thunder River Rapids Ride was closed in October 2016 after 4 riders were killed on the ride. This saw the removal of almost every Gold Rush themed buildings, sideshow attractions and theming. BuzzSaw was permanently closed in August 2021. Steel Taipan opened in the area of the park on 15 December 2021 to positive reviews.

== Attractions ==
=== Current Attractions ===
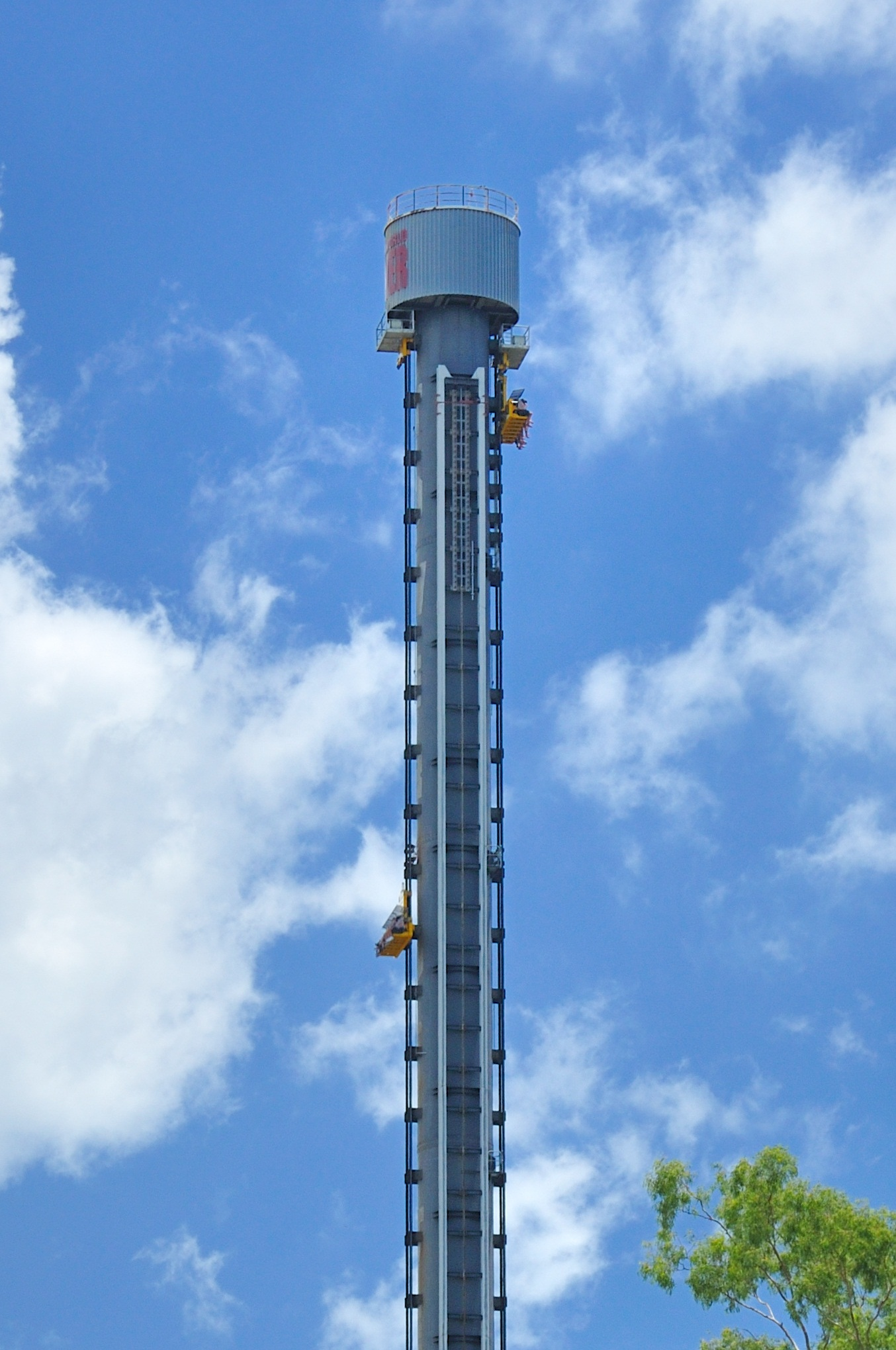
The Giant Drop

- The Dreamworld Express is one of Dreamworld's original, opening day attractions. At opening the ride was known as the Cannon Ball Express and only featured one stop. The train takes guests on a scenic route around Dreamworld with four stops along the way: Central Station, Billabong Station, Corroboree Station and Rocky Hollow Station.
- The Giant Drop opened in 1998 as the world's tallest and fastest free fall ride. It is one of Dreamworld's Big 7 Thrill Rides and is situated on the Dreamworld Tower. The ride was manufactured by Intamin, the company responsible for the Tower of Terror which shares the same tower.
- Steel Taipan is a 1,200 metres (3,900 ft) long steel launched coaster which opened on 15 December 2021 to coincide with the park's 40th anniversary. The roller coaster features a triple-launch system, a first in the Southern Hemisphere. The ride reaches a top speed 104.9 kilometres per hour (65.2 mph) and reaches a height of 39 metres (128 ft), making it one of the fastest and tallest roller coaster in Australia.

=== Previous attractions ===
- BuzzSaw was a Maurer Söhne SkyLoop roller coaster in the Town of Gold Rush. The roller coaster begins with a vertical chain lift hill to a height of 46.2 metres (152 ft). Riders, restrained by only a lap bar, are then pulled slowly back over on themselves before the train is released into a full heartline roll. A steep drop returns riders back to the station. It closed in 2021.

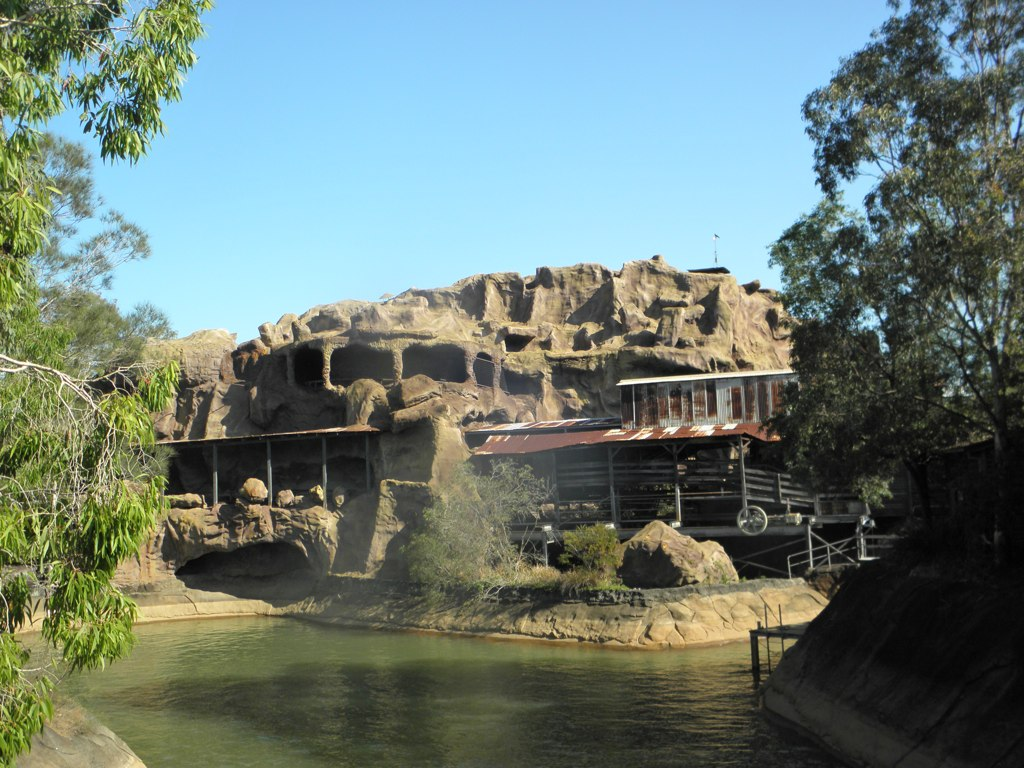
Eureka Mountain Mine Ride

- Eureka Mountain Mine Ride was a wild mouse roller coaster designed by HyFab. The ride has not operated since 2006 due to safety concerns.
- Helicopter Joy Flights allowed park visitors to take helicopter flights taking in views of Dreamworld and the Gold Coast. Visitors could choose from five different flight paths. Joy flights incurred an additional expense. The helicopter tours have not resumed since June 2009 when a helicopter crashed in the carpark of Dreamworld causing only minor injuries. The launch pad previously formed part of the defunct BuzzSaw's area and the sales booth was a beverage outlet named Jack's Watering Hole up until late 2016.

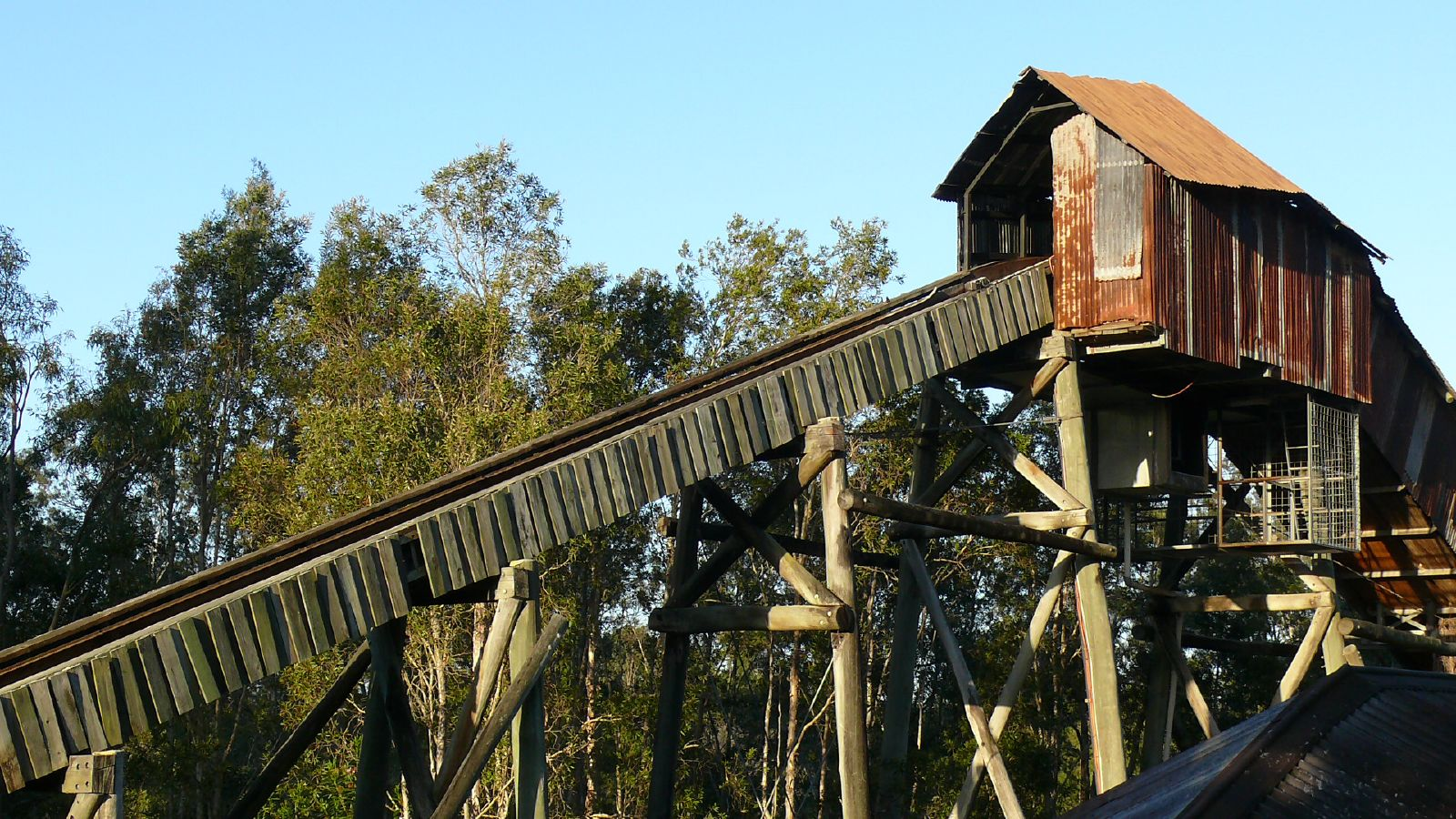
The final drop on the Log Ride.

- Rocky Hollow Log Ride was a log flume which took groups of 4 riders on a gentle four and a half-minute cruise through channels, in and out of buildings, before ascending the lift hill. The ride concluded with a 50 kilometres per hour (31 mph) drop causing all riders to become soaked. The ride was designed and built in-house by Dreamworld with assistance from overseas engineers.

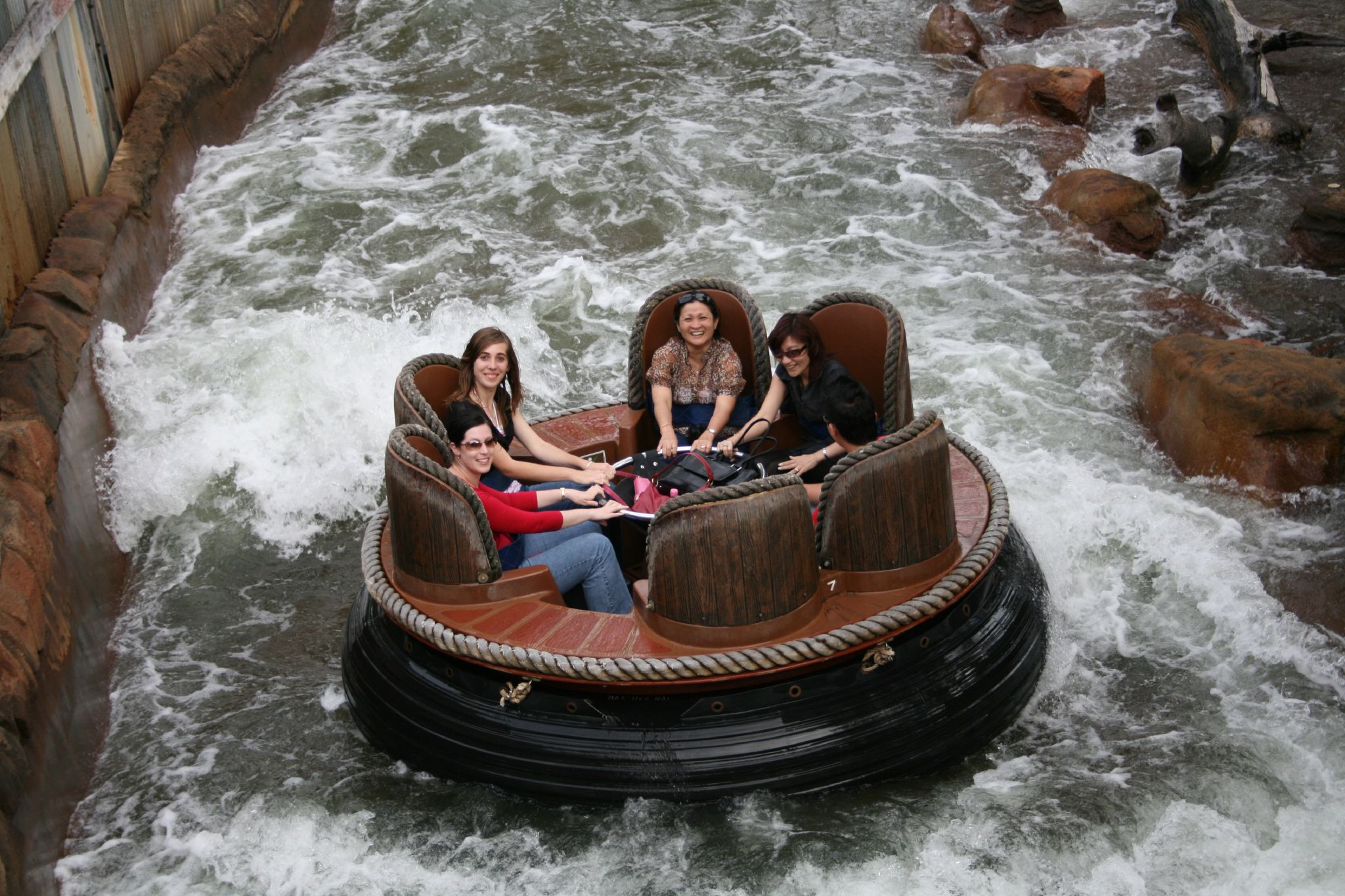
The Thunder River Rapids Ride

- Thunder River Rapids was a river rapid water ride which featured floating rafts holding up to six people floating down a foamy, turbulent river reaching speeds of up to 45 kilometres per hour (28 mph). Riders could end up quite wet due to waves splashing over the side of the raft. The ride opened in October 1986 in conjunction with the opening of Gold Rush Country. The ride originally featured a rotating platform which allowed riders to board and dismount the 6 person boats without the need for stopping them. This functionality was decommissioned due to safety concerns. The ride continued to be the park's most popular ride until its closure in 2016 after four riders were killed. On 9 November Deborah Thomas the chief executive of Ardent Leisure, Dreamworlds' parent company, announced that the ride would be permanently closed and demolished.

== Shopping & Dining ==
Gold Rush Country is currently home to the "Old Time Photos" store where you can purchase gold rush themed photographs. It was also formerly home to several of shopping and food and beverage outlets. Most outlets were closed in October 2016 after most of the area was closed and demolished as a result of the Thunder River Rapids incident. Prior to October 2016, Gold Rush Country featured:

- Jack's Watering Hole - a food and beverage outlet (closed 2016)

Various forms of Gold Rush themed merchandise could be purchased from the:

- BuzzSaw Mill General Store - merchandise themed to the BuzzSaw roller coaster (closed 2021)
- Thunder River Rapids Photos - merchandise themed to the Thunder River Rapids Ride (closed 2016)

Additionally the Rocky Hollow sub-area featured a photo store (previously a cafe) for the Rocky Hollow Log Ride. The store was demolished in 2021 after remaining inactive for years.
