= Rocky Hollow Log Ride =

Amusement park ride

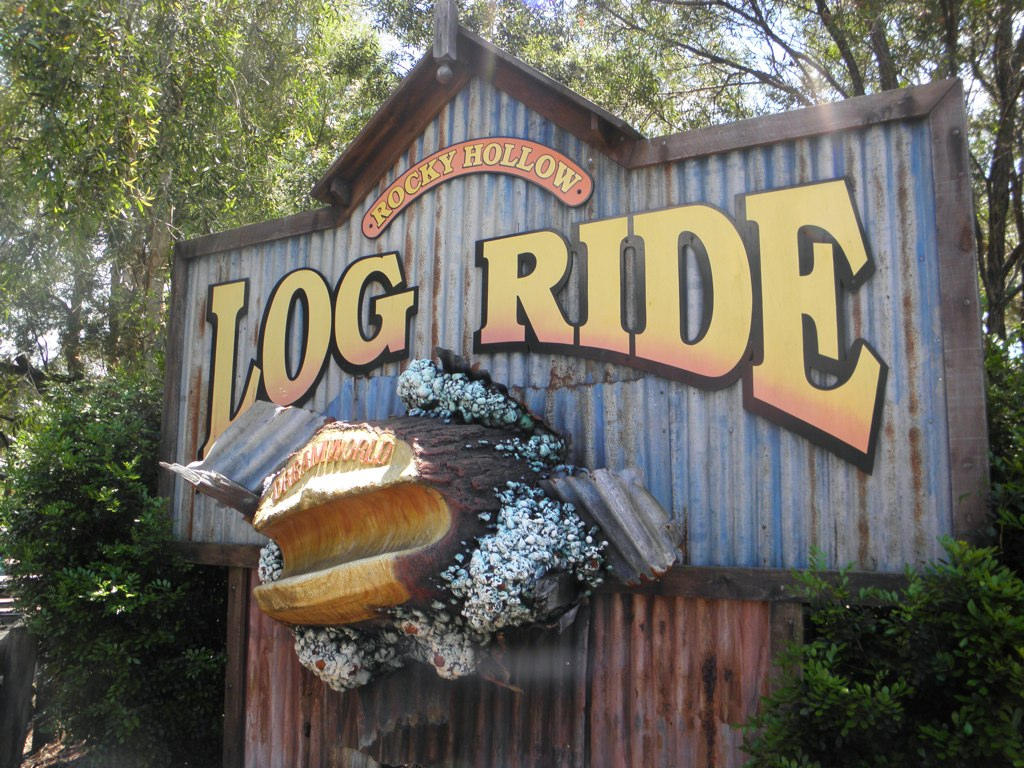

Dreamworld
- Area: Gold Rush Country
- Coordinates: 27°51′41.21″S 153°18′57.93″E
- Status: Removed
- Opening date: 15 December 1981
- Closing date: 8 February 2020

General statistics
- Type: Log flume
- Manufacturer: Dreamworld
- Designer: John Longhurst
- Lift system: 2 conveyor belt lift
- Height: 12 m (39 ft)
- Drop: 11.3 m (37 ft)
- Length: 500 m (1,600 ft)
- Speed: 50 km/h (31 mph)
- Max vertical angle: 22°
- Duration: 4:20
- Boats: 12 boats. Riders are arranged 1 across in 4 rows for a total of 4 riders per boat.
- Ride Express was available

The Rocky Hollow Log Ride was a log flume which took groups of 4 riders on a gentle four and a half-minute cruise through channels, in and out of buildings, before ascending the lift hill. The ride concluded with a 50 kilometres per hour (31 mph) drop causing all riders to become soaked.

The ride opened on 15 December 1981, the opening day of Dreamworld. Rocky Hollow Log Ride was the last original opening day attraction of Dreamworld in its original form and the third last original opening day attraction still operating, the surviving two are Vintage Car Adventure and Dreamworld Express.

Throughout its 38-year life span, the ride has faced several closures, refurbishment and incidents.

== History ==
=== Early planning & construction (pre 1981) ===
The Rocky Hollow Log Ride opened with Dreamworld on 15 December 1981. During the construction of Dreamworld, John Longhurst, Dreamworld's creator, wanted the park to include rides that would satisfy all age groups. Shortly, a log flume and a paddle steamer were introduced, being called the Rocky Hollow Log Ride and Captain Sturt Paddlewheeler respectively. The ride was one of the park's original attractions. Since its opening, the ride has been refurbished several times which includes the reconstruction of both drops. The ride was constructed in-house by Dreamworld with assistance from overseas engineers.

=== 1981–2016 ===
Since opening, the Rocky Hollow Log Ride, alongside, Thunder River Rapids Ride, were the park's most popular attractions, surpassing the popularity of Tower of Terror, The Giant Drop and Cyclone. The ride was closed in May 2004 for a refurbishment for one of the ride's drops. Bob Seow Tan, Dreamworld's General Manager of Engineering & Technical confirmed that the first and smaller drop of the ride would be rebuilt due to corrosion on the ride. The ride reopened briefly on 21 May 2004. The ride's second and tallest drop would also soon later be rebuilt. The Rocky Hollow Log Ride closed on 16 April 2016 due to an accident. It re-opened on 20 April 2016 having received the 'all clear' from independent and Worksafe Queensland inspectors.

=== 2016 closure and reopening ===
The ride was closed after the Thunder River Rapids Ride accident in 2016 caused four deaths. Unlike other rides and attractions at the park which were constantly being inspected and tested, Rocky Hollow Log Ride remained dormant and was blocked off by a wall. The ride didn't reopen until the start of 2018. During this closure, many of the tunnel sections were demolished due to safety concerns and bars were added to the logs (like a cage) to prevent guests from standing and falling out. The log ride was the last attraction to reopen post the Thunder River Rapids accident. The Rocky Hollow Log Ride was the first ever log flume to have roofs installed on them to prevent guests from standing up.

=== Permanent Closure ===
In late 2019, the ride was closed for annual maintenance. A few months later on 8 February 2020, Dreamworld announced that the Rocky Hollow Log Ride would not return from scheduled maintenance and would be closed permanently. The news came alongside an announcement for a refurbishment of the ABC Kids World themed area and the Hot Wheels SideWinder roller coaster. The ride was the third major ride in the park to be closed since the Thunder River Rapids Ride accident. The ride, along with the former photo store, was completely demolished in May 2021. A small shed containing high voltage power however, still remains on site. The ride was Dreamworld's last remaining water ride.

== Characteristics ==
At the time of its closure, The Rocky Hollow Log Ride was one of the park's nine family rides alongside Dreamworld Express, Escape from Madagascar, Gingy's Glider, MAD Jungle Jam, Shockwave, Skadoosh Bumper Cars, Sky Voyager and Vintage Car Adventure. The ride reached a maximum speed of 50 kilometres per hour (31 mph) and had a drop height of 11.3 metres (37 ft). The ride's layout was approximately 500 metres (1,600 ft). The ride lasted for four minutes and twenty seconds per cycle.

There were 12 log vehicles that could carry four guests each.

== Ride Experience ==
=== Queue ===
Guests queue in an undercover area which is located alongside the station and splashdown area. Guests with a Ride Express virtual queuing device must enter via the ride's exit path.

=== Station ===
To access the station guests must walk up a small series of stairs and cross to the centre of the station. The station is made up of four platforms in a two by two layout. The back two are for unloading guests while the front two are for loading guests. This station configuration allows a higher throughput and therefore capacity.

=== Ride ===
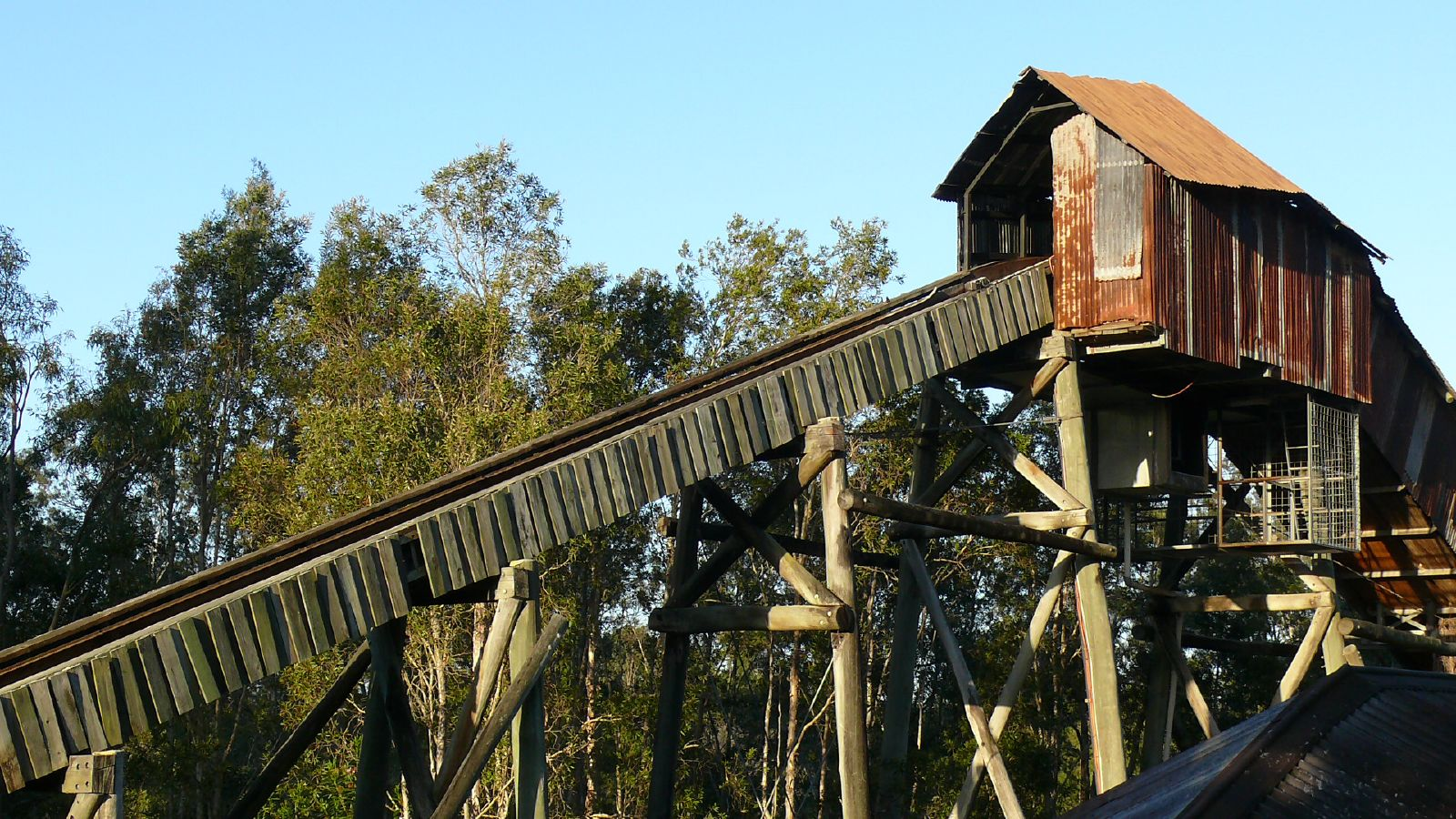
The final drop on the Log Ride.

Once boarded the four passenger logs, guests follow a short path towards a building. Concealed inside the building is a short conveyor belt lift hill. A drop quickly follows with the log's splashdown occurring outside of the building. A slow boat ride then follows weaving between buildings and initially going under caves before the final drop is approached. A second conveyor belt takes riders up the final drop within a tunnel. Once at the top the log goes back out into the open before dropping a steady drop to the splashdown. A 180° bend follows before the ride returns to the station. Most cave sections had since been removed after the 2018 reopening of the ride.

== Reception ==
The Rocky Hollow Log Ride, alongside Thunder River Rapids Ride, were Dreamworld's most popular rides. Despite more modern and thrilling attractions being opened over time, both rides were still the most popular rides at Dreamworld. Macquarie Leisure Trust, the owners of Dreamworld in 2002, stated "the Thunder River Rapids and the Log Ride remain the most popular attractions in the park due to their large capacity and ride frequency".

== 2016 incident ==
Rocky Hollow Log Ride accident
- Date: 16 April 2016
- Deaths: 0
- Injuries: 1

On 16 April 2016, 18 year-old Samson Sherrin stood up during the ride and fell out, sustaining serious injuries. He was run over by two other boats and he sustained hip, rib and ankle fractures, neck and head injuries and acute respiratory failure. He also suffered psychological trauma after the incident. The ride was closed for two days before receiving the all clear from Worksafe Queensland inspectors.

== See also ==
- Thunder River Rapids Ride, a river rapids ride built in-house by Dreamworld
- Viking's Revenge Flume Ride, a log flume built in-house by Dreamworld's competitor park, Sea World
- Wild West Falls Adventure Ride, a log flume built by Hopkins Rides at Dreamworld other competitor park, Warner Bros. Movie World
