= Steel Taipan =

Launched roller coaster at Dreamworld

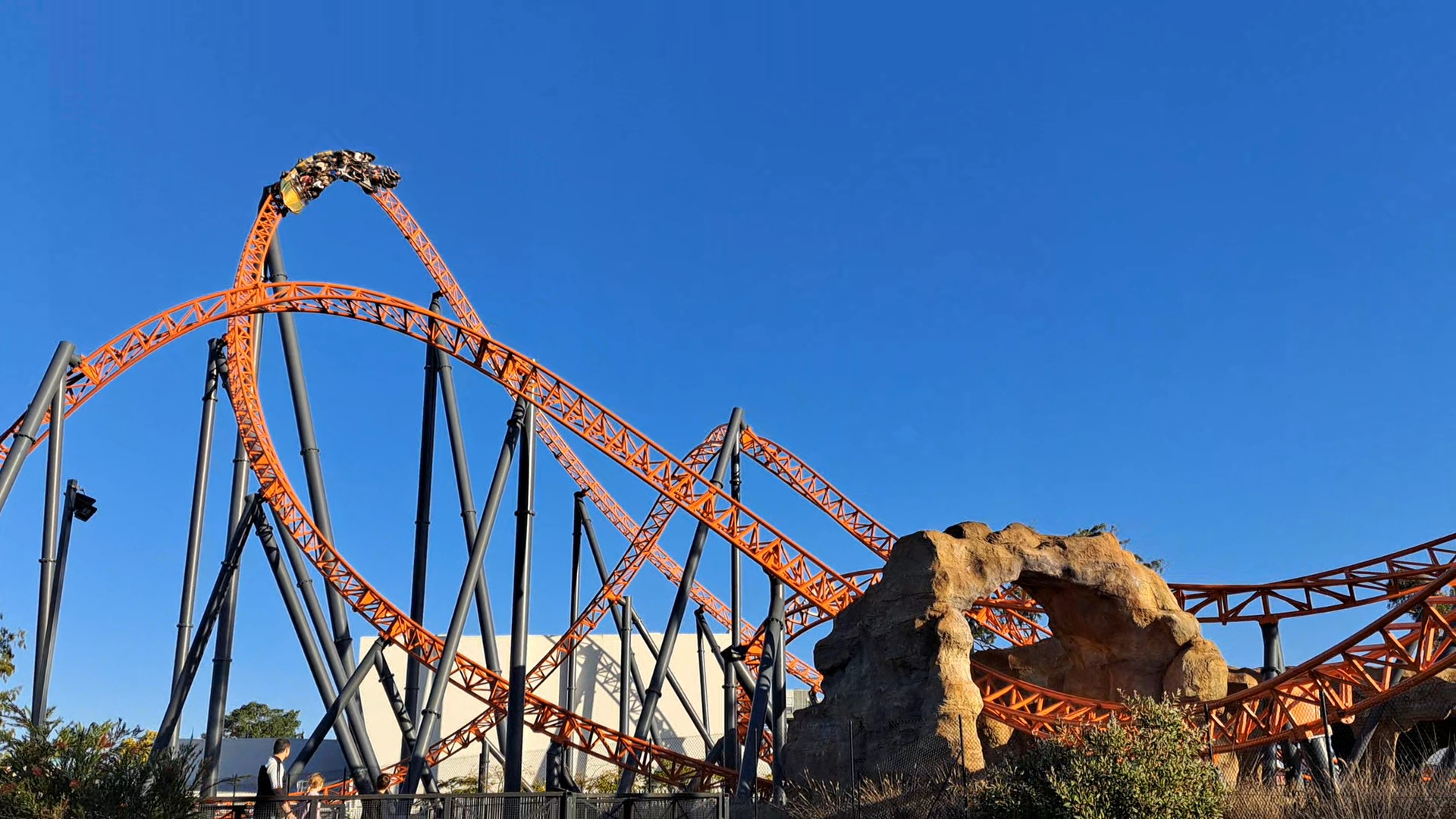

Dreamworld
- Location: Dreamworld
- Park section: Gold Rush Country
- Coordinates: 27°51′44.44″S 153°18′54.84″E
- Status: Operating
- Soft opening date: 10 December 2021
- Opening date: 15 December 2021
- Cost: A$32,000,000
- Replaced: Eureka Mountain Mine Ride; Thunder River Rapids Ride

General statistics
- Type: Steel – Launched
- Manufacturer: Mack Rides
- Model: Launch Coaster
- Lift/launch system: LSM launch
- Height: 39 m (128 ft)
- Length: 1,200 m (3,900 ft)
- Speed: 104.9 km/h (65.2 mph)
- Inversions: 4
- Max vertical angle: 94°
- Capacity: 820 riders per hour
- G-force: 3.8
- Height restriction: 130–200 cm (4 ft 3 in – 6 ft 7 in)
- Ride Express available
- Single rider line available
- Steel Taipan at RCDB

Steel Taipan is a steel launched roller coaster at Dreamworld in Coomera, Queensland, Australia. Steel Taipan is a direct replacement to the former Thunder River Rapids Ride. The roller coaster, the first triple-launched coaster in the Southern Hemisphere, is named after the deadly Taipan family of snakes native to Australia.

== History ==
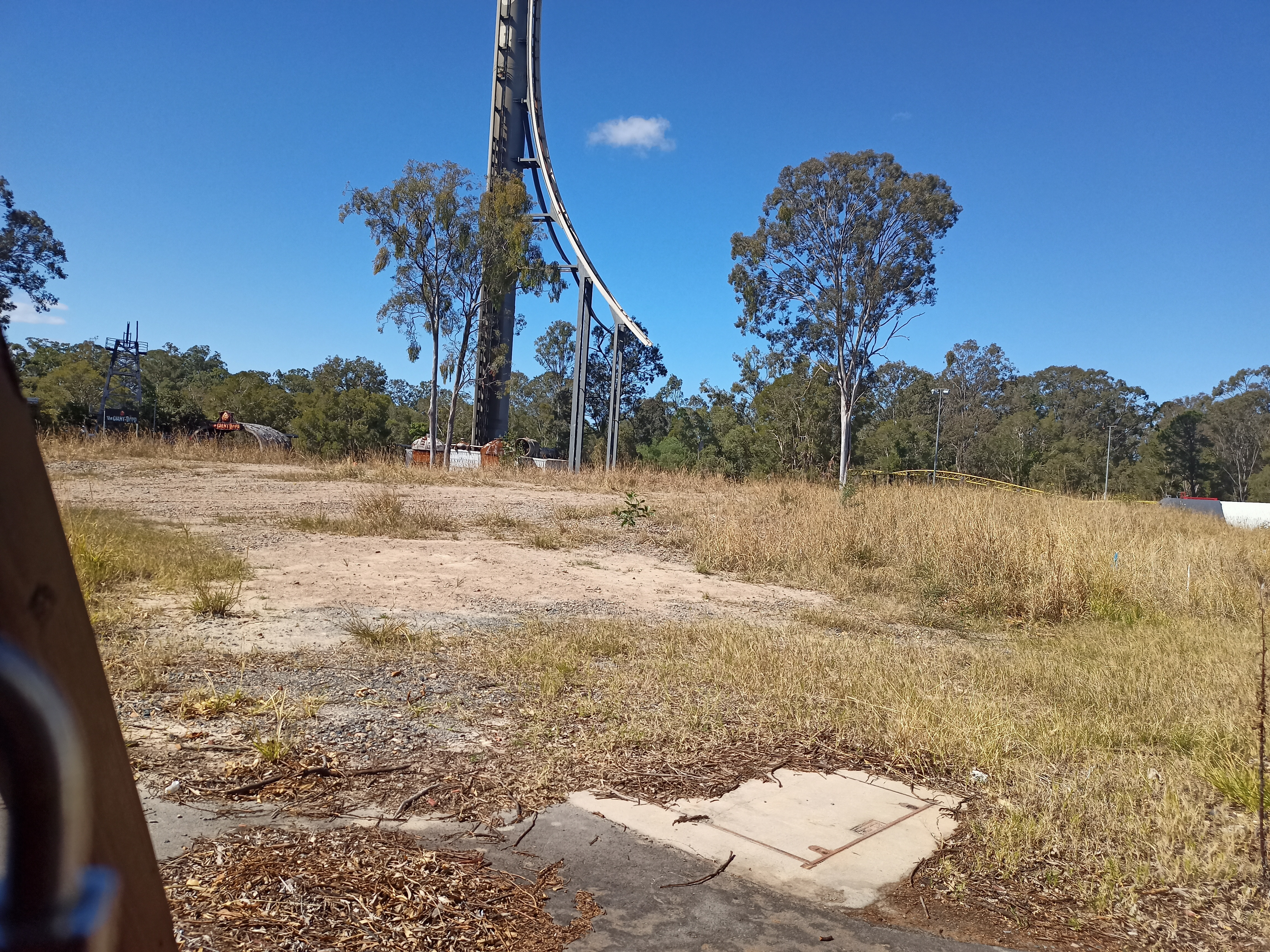
Construction site in October 2020.

Steel Taipan was first announced on 23 August 2019, alongside the announcement of the $7,000,000 Fully 6 body slide complex in the adjacent WhiteWater World. Steel Taipan, then unnamed, was confirmed to be a near-clone of Mack's popular Blue Fire launched coaster model, except with a unique backwards portion and swing launch section as well as a spinning cart on the back row. The park had been able to secure the ride's hardware on a reduced timeline, as it was originally meant as a now-cancelled attraction at an unspecified Chinese park. Although a name had been undecided, two possible options had been trademarked during late November 2019; Hiss-teria and Steel Taipan.

On 19 March 2020, park owner Ardent Leisure officially announced that they had established new financial measures to combat the then-emerging COVID-19 pandemic, which included freezing all non-essential costs. This included halting construction and thus indefinitely delaying Steel Taipan, removing it from its initial December 2020 target opening. Throughout the spring, supports and track would begin to arrive at the park, although very little groundwork had taken place by that point in time and construction had not yet started. Construction finally broke ground in late September, just after the park reopened from a COVID-induced shutdown.

In late November 2020, Steel Taipan manufacturer Mack Rides unveiled their brand new HybridTrain spinning coaster car test concept just after the IAAPA annual convention, which was held virtually for 2020. Instead of the standard 4 seater spinning car, it would instead be a more agile 2 passenger car that could be more easily added onto existing and new launch coasters while abiding to tight clearances. The design also allowed for magnets in the seats to control the spinning speed. It was confirmed to debut on Steel Taipan, and a prototype had been tested on the similar Blue Fire launch coaster at Europa Park in Rust, Germany.

In late November, Dreamworld formally announced the coaster's name to be Steel Taipan, as expected. Excavation and groundwork had also started to begin some time prior to that, after the park reopened, and Steel Taipan was on track for a late 2021 opening.

Vertical construction of Steel Taipan began in April 2021 when the launch track was installed. In May, the vertical loop was completed. During this time, Dreamworld confirmed that Steel Taipan would feature a tunnel and mist effects. The twisted spike was then topped off in June. The track layout was then completed in August and testing began the following month. Steel Taipan had a soft opening on 10 December 2021 to a selected group of people. On 11 December 2021, the roller coaster opened to annual pass holders. A full opening commenced on 15 December 2021.

== Characteristics ==
=== Location ===
Steel Taipan is located in the Dreamworld Main Street section of the park. The ride was constructed on the site of the former Eureka Mountain Mine Ride and the Thunder River Rapids Ride, which closed permanently immediately following an October 2016 accident that saw four people killed and left the park's reputation and infrastructure mostly crippled. It also interacts with parts of the Dreamworld Express train ride, which received some modifications during construction in order to accommodate the coaster.

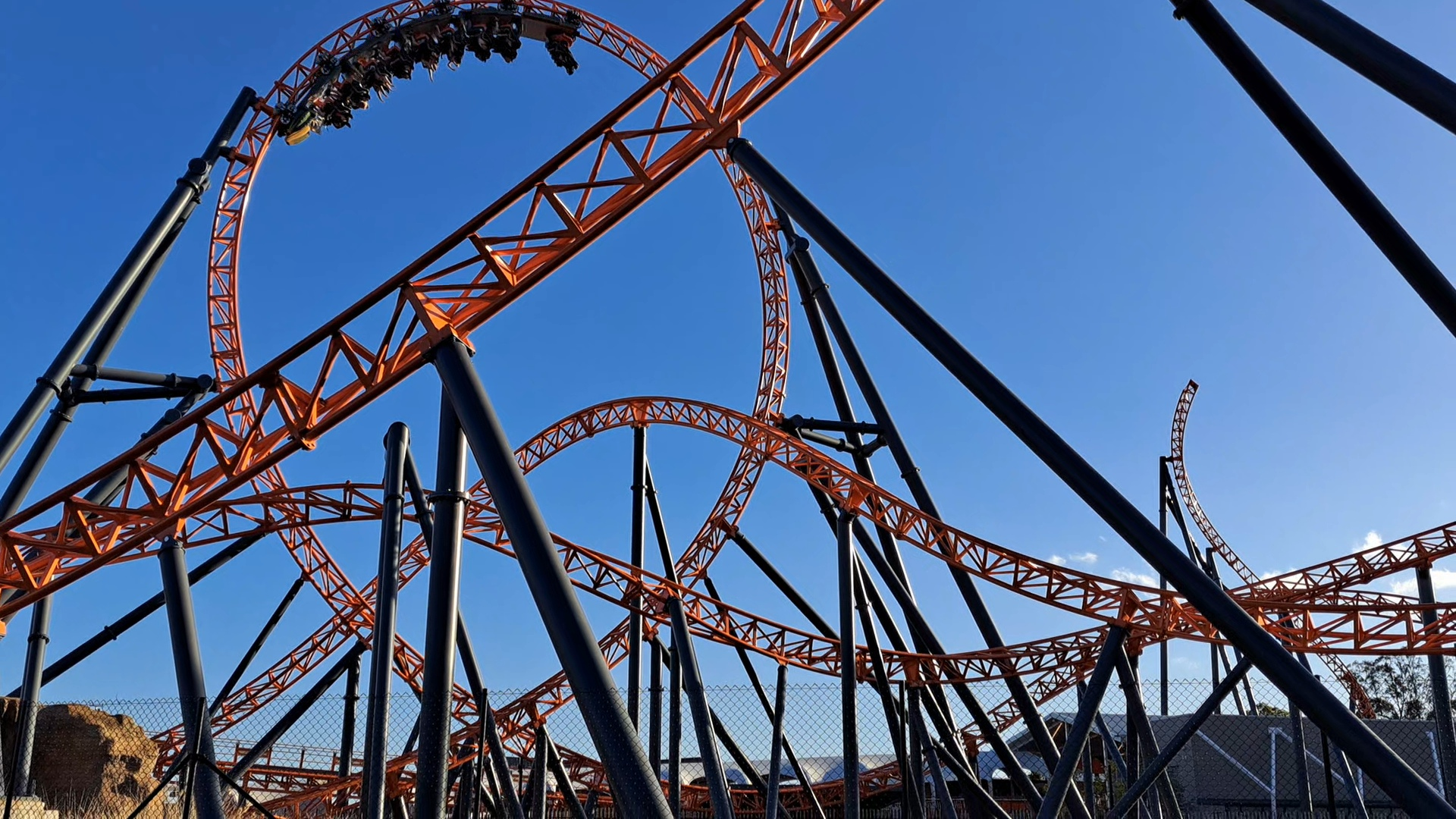
Steel Taipan in 2023

=== Similarities to other attractions ===
Blue Fire opened in 2009 at Europa Park in Rust, Germany, which was also run by Mack Rides themselves. It was their first coaster to utilize a Linear Synchronous Motor launch, and proved to be very successful for the company. During the 2010s, the ride was heavily cloned and installed at parks in China, Russia, and the UAE.

Blue Fire, since it was custom-built for Europa Park, includes an extended turn into the launch room, which makes up the ride's dark ride section, and also has the ability to run up to 5 trains at a time. All the clones installed since then possess the same extended turnaround, although they feature a reduced number of trains. Steel Taipan's beginning and launch area differ greatly from these attractions, as the following modifications were made to the attraction;

- The extended turn into the launch section was removed and instead replaced with a hairpin turn and switch track to the launch area.
- The launch hardware and programming was reconfigured so that the train could be launched in both directions along the track.
- The twisted spike shuttle track was added to the back end of the launch.
- The maximum speed was increased from 62.1 mph (99.9 km/h) to 65.2 mph (104.9 km/h), the length increased from 3,464.5 feet (1,056.0 m) to 3,937 feet (1,200 m), and with the twisted spike, the model's total height was increased slightly from 124.7 feet (38.0 m) to 128 feet (39 m).

== Ride experience ==
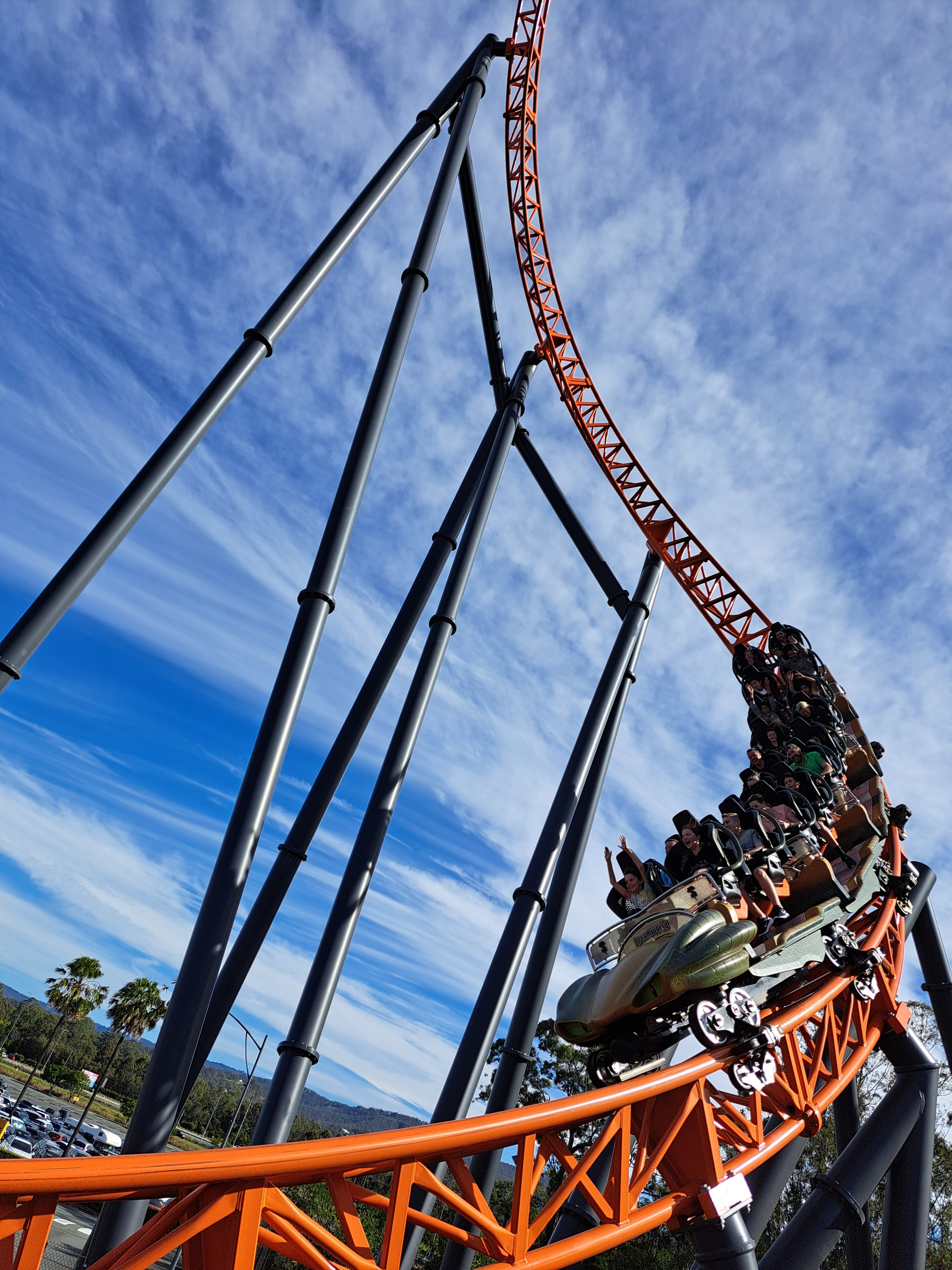
The ride's twisted spike

The ride begins with a left hand turnaround out of the station and onto the launch track, parallel to the former BuzzSaw roller coaster and car park. The train launches up the attraction's signature 124.7-foot (38.0 m) tall wave turn, but ultimately does not gain enough speed to crest it, thus rolling back into the launch. The train is blasted backwards into a 128-foot (39 m) curved spike overtop the Dreamworld Express train ride; its one distinguishing feature from the standard Blue Fire layout. Rolling forwards once again, the train hits the launch track for the third and final time, where it reaches speeds of approximately 65.2 mph (104.9 km/h) and tops the wave turn, leading into the first of four inversions on the ride; a 105 feet (32 m) vertical loop. Exiting such, it twists around and up into a mid-course brake run, which then leads into a pair of back-to-back twisted horseshoe rolls and an airtime hill through the centre of the loop. Riders enter another slow turnaround and ride through the final inversion on the ride, a heartline roll, before making a final right-hand turn into the brake run.

== See also ==
- 2021 in amusement parks
