= SkyPoint Observation Deck =

Observation deck in Gold Coast, Australia

SkyPoint

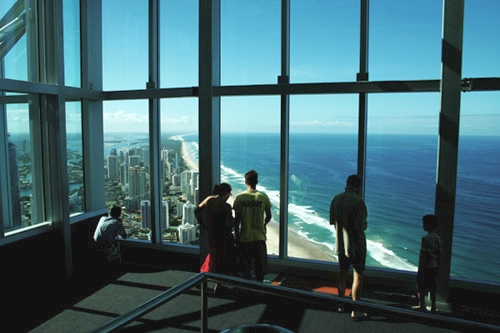
- View looking north from SkyPoint

Q1
- Area: Floor 77 & 78
- Coordinates: 28°00′22″S 153°25′46″E
- Status: Operating
- Opening date: 26 October 2005
- Replaced: Q1 Observation Tower; QDeck

Ride statistics
- Attraction type: Observation tower
- Owner: Ardent Leisure
- Height: 230 m (750 ft) (Observation Deck); 270 m (890 ft) (SkyPoint Climb)
- Website: Official website
- This is a pay-per-use attraction

SkyPoint (formerly Q1 Observation Deck and QDeck) is an observation deck located 230 metres (750 ft) off the ground at the top of the Q1 on the Gold Coast, Australia. The attraction is operated by Ardent Leisure.

== History ==
Over the course of a 3-year construction period from 2002 to 2005, Q1 was built. When the tower opened on 26 October 2005, it featured an observation deck known as the Q1 Observation Deck which was owned and operated by Sunland. In 2006 it was sold off to the MFS group. In the late 2000s it was renamed the QDeck. Following the receivership of the MFS group in 2009, Ardent Leisure purchased the observation deck for $13.5 million. As part of a $1 million refurbishment, it was rebranded as SkyPoint in 2010.

On 26 September 2011, the construction of the SkyPoint Climb began. In November 2011, Ardent Leisure began recruiting staff for the SkyPoint Climb with more than 100 people applying for the 12 available positions. The SkyPoint Climb officially opened on 14 January 2012.

Following the purchase of the observation deck, Ardent Leisure has reported that profits have increased from $1.7 million to $4.93 million in the 9 months to March 2011. This gained the company a 15.4% return on their capital in the 11 months to May 2011. In 2012, the company began combined ticketing options with their other Gold Coast attractions, Dreamworld and WhiteWater World.

== SkyPoint Observation Deck ==
The SkyPoint Observation Deck is located on level 77 and 78 of the Q1 building. It features a museum, weather station, theatrette and lounge bar across two levels. It is Australia's only beachside observation deck and has room enough for 400 people. It towers 230 metres above the Surfers Paradise beach, giving viewers a 360-degree view of Brisbane to the north, the Gold Coast hinterland to the west, Byron Bay to the south and the Pacific Ocean to the east. The express lift to the observation deck travels the 77 floors in 43 seconds.

== SkyPoint Climb ==
SkyPoint Climb is an external building walk available at SkyPoint. It requires guests to pay an additional fee. Guests are harnessed before walking up and around the top of the tower. The journey lasts 1.5 hours.

== See also ==
- Dreamworld
- WhiteWater World
