= Thunder River Rapids Ride =

Theme park ride

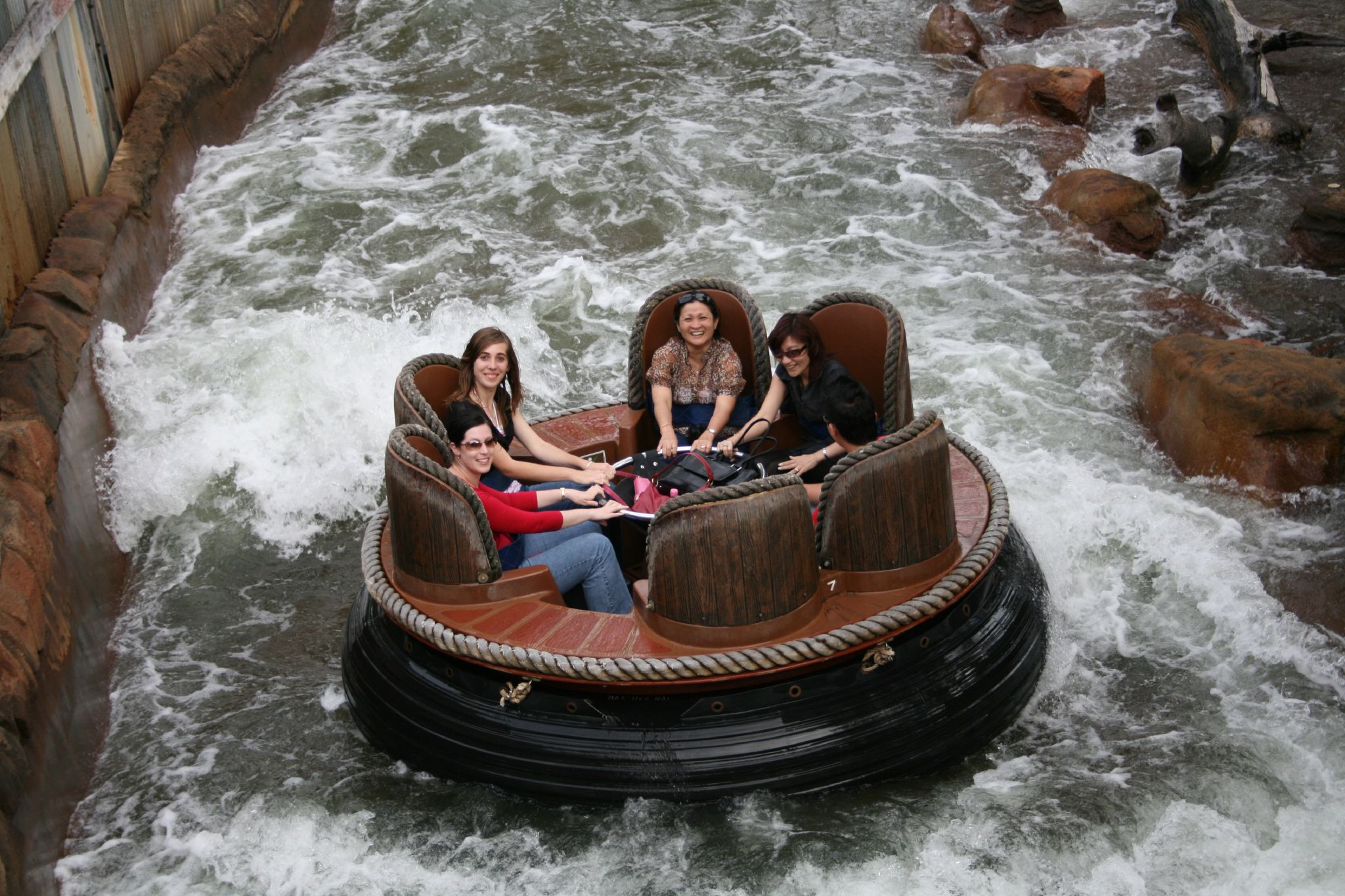
- The main rapids section of the Thunder River Rapids Ride.

Dreamworld
- Area: Town of Gold Rush
- Coordinates: 27°51′44.44″S 153°18′54.85″E
- Status: Removed
- Opening date: 11 December 1986
- Closing date: 25 October 2016 (Note: Although the ride was temporarily closed after the incident on 25 October 2016, it was later deemed to be closed indefinitely. On 9 November 2016 it was shut permanently and later demolished, in a mark of respect for the families involved.)
- Replaced by: Steel Taipan

General statistics
- Type: River rafting ride
- Model: Custom
- Length: 410 m (1,350 ft)
- Speed: 45 km/h (28 mph)
- Duration: 4:10
- Height restriction: 120 cm (3 ft 11 in)
- Website: Thunder River Rapids
- Ride Express was available

The Thunder River Rapids Ride was a river rapid type water ride located in the Town of Gold Rush section of the Dreamworld theme park on the Gold Coast, Queensland, Australia.

After four riders were killed on it on 25 October 2016, the ride was closed. On 9 November 2016, Ardent Leisures' CEO announced that the ride would not reopen, and was to be demolished. In October 2017, police recommended that no criminal charges be laid against any person in relation to the deaths.

== History ==
Gold Rush Country (now known as the Town of Gold Rush) opened on 11 December 1986. The area featured the Eureka Mountain Mine Ride and the Thunder River Rapids Ride. Although resembling an Intamin River rapids ride, Thunder River Rapids was neither built nor supplied by Intamin. A Sydney-based company was commissioned to supply the vessels in 1983. The Thunder River Rapids Ride was among the most popular rides at Dreamworld until its closure.

== Characteristics ==
At the time of closure, Thunder River Rapids Ride was one of Dreamworld’s nine family rides alongside Dreamworld Express, Escape from Madagascar, Gingy’s Glider, MAD Jungle Jam, Rocky Hollow Log Ride, Shockwave, Skadoosh Bumper Cars, Vintage Car Adventure. The ride consisted of several circular rafts which can carry up to 6 riders each.

The ride was 410 metres (1,350 ft) long and had a maximum speed of 45 kilometres per hour (28 mph). An entire cycle on the Thunder River Rapids Ride lasted approximately 4 minutes.

== Ride experience ==
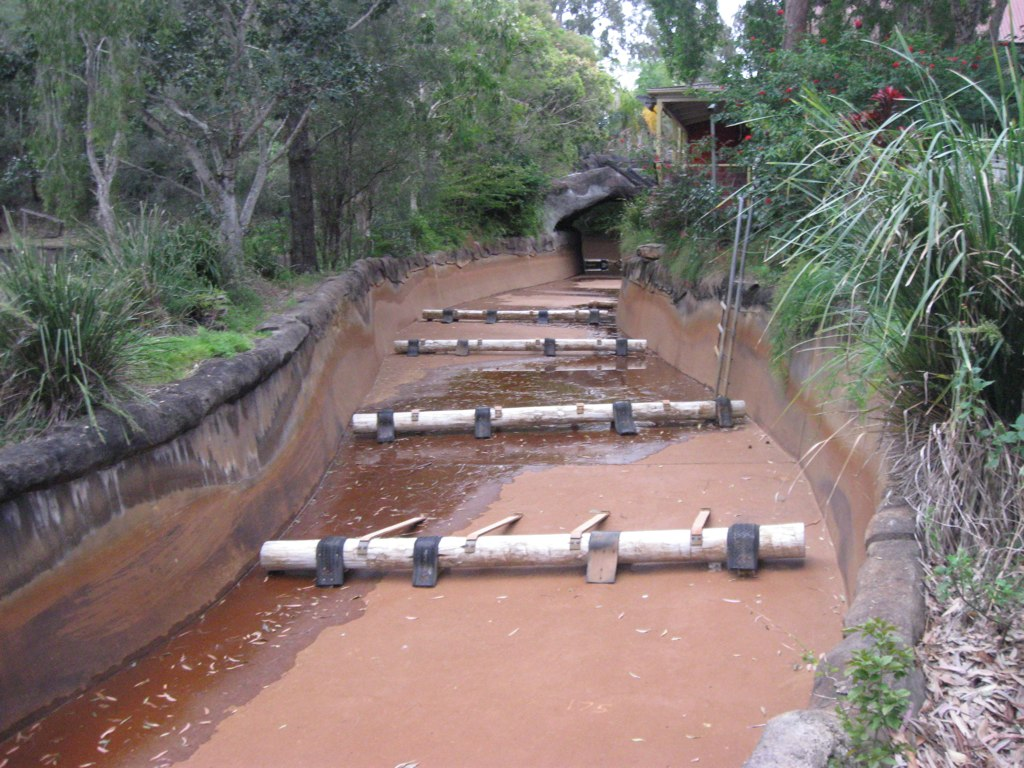
The rapids were achieved by logs attached to the base of a river channel.

=== Queue ===
Riders entered a long indoor queue with several switchbacks. The queue then bridged across part of the ride's water storage area before reaching the circular station. This station originally featured a rotating platform which allowed riders to mount and dismount the boats without the need for the boats to stop.

=== Ride ===
Riders would board one of several six-person circular rafts. The raft was dispatched and the riders travelled back past the ride's queue and into a cave. Upon exiting the cave, riders experienced the main rapids section of the ride. This section ran alongside a large water catchment which contained the water storage for the Thunder River Rapids Ride. The raft then went under the Eureka Mountain Mine Ride's station and headed back towards its own station. Before departing the ride, guests were brought back up to the level of the station by a conveyor belt.

== 2016 fatal accident ==
2016 Thunder River Rapids Ride accident
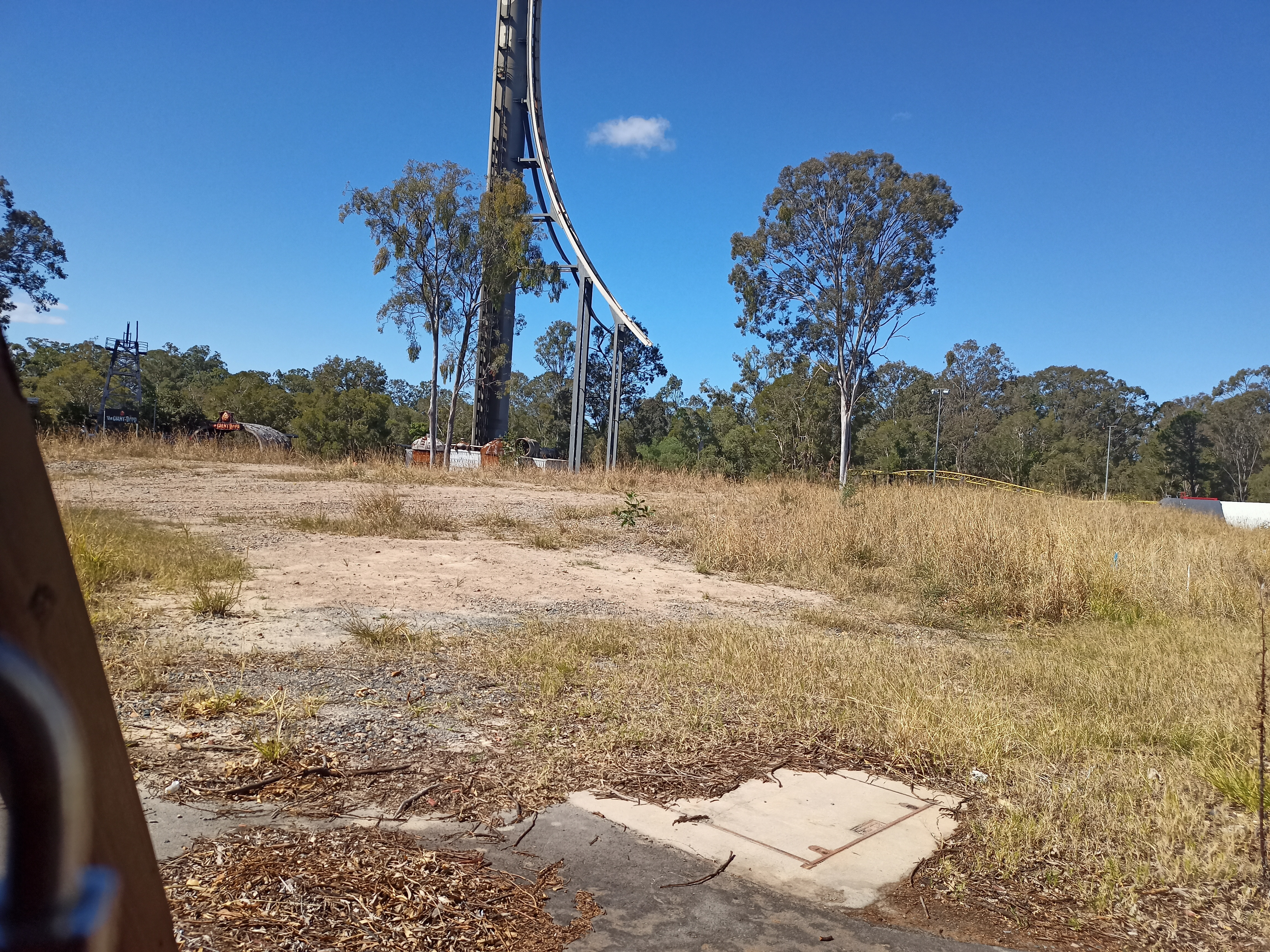
- The site of the river rapids ride in October 2020, now the site of Steel Taipan.
- Date: 25 October 2016
- Location: Dreamworld, Gold Coast, Australia
- Type: Amusement ride accident
- Cause: Improper maintenance and lack of staff training
- Deaths: 4
- Coroner: James McDougall
- Arrests: None
- Charges: 3
- Verdict: Ardent Leisure fined A$3,600,000 for the breach of the Work Health and Safety Act

On 25 October 2016, a malfunction of the Thunder River Rapids Ride resulted in the deaths of four people. It is regarded as the 4th worst accident in the world by Coasterpedia.

Due to the failure of both large water pumps essential for the ride's operation, the water level in the ride dropped quickly, causing a raft, which was also occupied, to become stranded on its support rails near the end of the raft conveyor, meaning that it was unable to reach the unloading area. Approximately one minute later, another raft, carrying six passengers, moved down the conveyor and collided with the stranded raft. Both rafts pivoted upwards, driven by movement of the conveyor, before the first raft fell back to a level position, resting on the support rails. The second raft was forced into a vertical position by the conveyor, and its passengers either fell out of the raft or became trapped close to the conveyor mechanism, resulting in fatal injuries to four passengers.

Once the conveyor had been shut down by park staff, the surviving passengers, both of whom were children, were able to climb out of the second raft, still in a vertical position, on to nearby platforms. The two survivors were reported to be physically unharmed, but were sent to hospital and offered counselling.

More than seven paramedic crews had responded to the 000 call, along with firefighters and police. They recovered the bodies of the deceased, which were badly disfigured from crush and compression injuries.

Dreamworld released a statement on its website and Facebook page stating:

Dreamworld is currently closed until further notice due to an incident at the park. We are deeply shocked and saddened by the tragic incident; our hearts and thoughts go out to the families involved and their loved ones.

Dreamworld announced that the park would reopen on 28 October for a special memorial service for the victims. However, the reopening to the public was subject to discussions with Queensland police as the ride was being treated as a crime scene. The 28 October reopening was cancelled on 27 October.

Gold Coast mayor, Tom Tate, offered his condolences to the families of those affected and promised support, financially and emotionally, to all those involved. The Australian prime minister, Malcolm Turnbull, offered his condolences and support, releasing a statement via Twitter: "I'm very saddened by the tragedy at Dreamworld today. Our thoughts and prayers are with the families."

On 29 October, the Queensland Government announced a "blitz" of safety inspections and an audit of state workplace health and safety laws.

The Busch Gardens Tampa theme park in Florida, United States, shut its Congo River Rapids ride in response to the incident, until the cause of the Dreamworld accident had been determined. It was reopened on 26 October, after a review and safety check had been completed.

=== Permanent closure ===
On 9 November, Ardent Leisure chief executive, Deborah Thomas, announced that the Thunder River Rapids Ride would be permanently closed, out of respect to the victims and their families, and that they would be invited to help create a memorial in its place. The ride was dismantled and the location fenced off.

In a report to the Queensland Coroner in October 2017, police recommended that no criminal charges be laid against any person.

=== Coroner's report ===
The Queensland Coroner, James McDougall, released a report on 24 February 2020, detailing "irresponsible", "dangerous" and "inadequate" safety practices at the theme park that contributed to the four deaths, and recommending the Queensland office of industrial relations consider a prosecution. The ride had endured frequent breakdowns in the days leading up to the accident, and had several design and construction problems which contributed to the accident.

Mr McDougall told a Brisbane court Dreamworld had a reputation as a "modern, world-class theme park" yet its safety and maintenance systems were "rudimentary at best".

and that:

... he would refer Dreamworld's parent company, Ardent Leisure, to the Queensland Office of Industrial Relations. He said Ardent Leisure "may have committed an offence under workplace laws".

=== Charges ===
On 21 July 2020, it was announced that three charges had been laid against Ardent Leisure, Dreamworld's parent company. The charges were filed by the Work Health and Safety prosecutor, under the Work Health and Safety Act, at the Brisbane Magistrates Court. The matter was first heard on July 29 in the Southport Magistrates Court. On the day before the scheduled trial, on 28 July 2020, Ardent Leisure pleaded guilty to the charges. Subsequently, in September 2020, they were fined $3.6 million (US$2.8 million) for the breach of the Work Health and Safety Act. In addition, a settlement amount for $2.1 million was paid to the family of one of the victims.

== Aftermath ==
Thunder River Rapids' remaining structures were demolished in 2018. On 23 August 2019, the park announced that a new roller coaster, Steel Taipan, would take its place in 2021 and also consume a portion of the area in use by the former Eureka Mountain Mine Ride. In total, Ardent Leisure reportedly paid out more than $5 million in compensation to the families of the victims as well as to emergency responders and witnesses. A memorial garden for the victims was built near the site of the Thunder River Rapids Ride. The husband of one of the adult victims was declared missing on 15 July 2021 when his car was found ditched at Uriarra Crossing. Authorities searched the area during the perilous winter weather but never recovered any possible evidence.
