= Deborah Thomas (businesswoman) =

Australian businesswoman

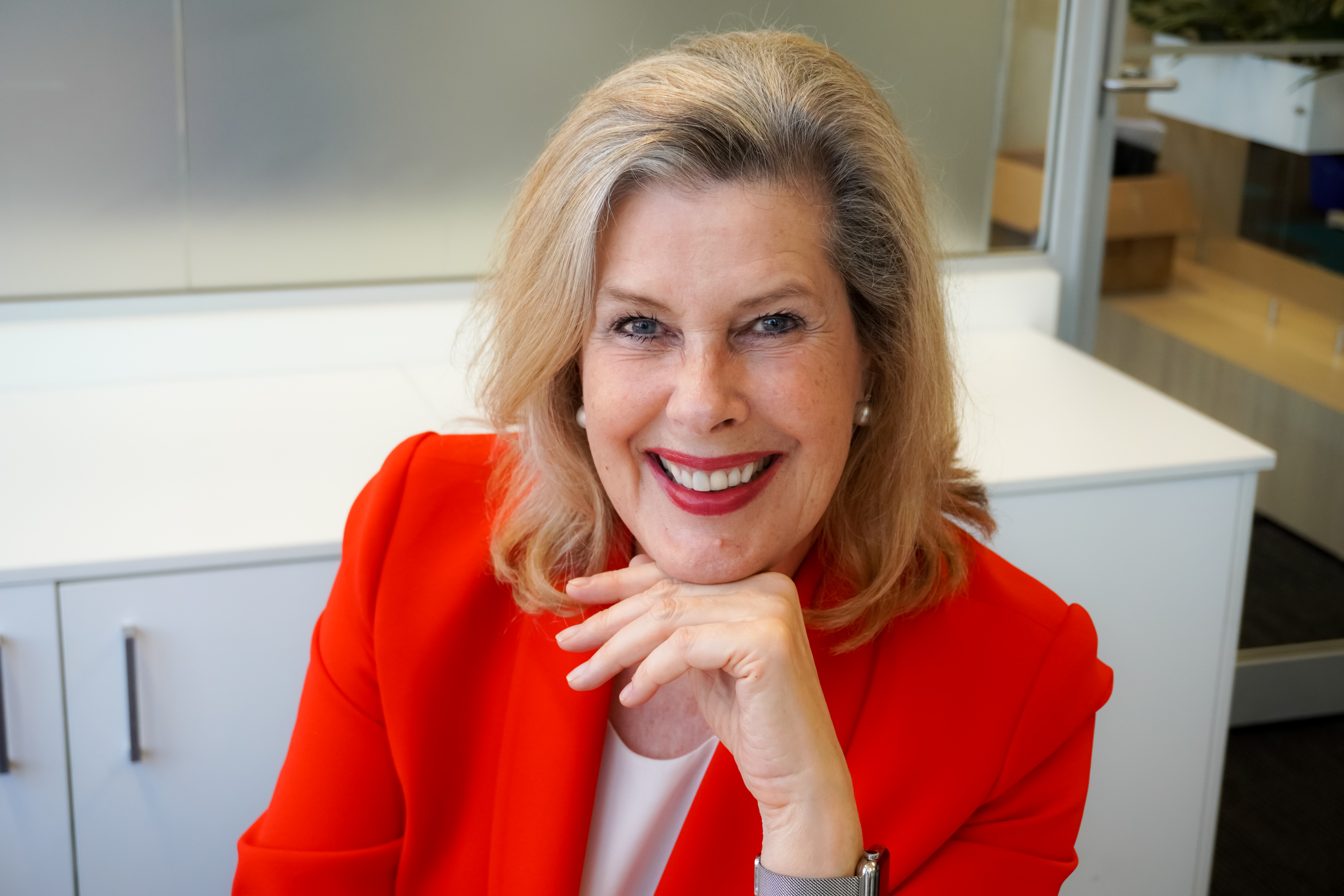
- Occupation: Businesswoman

Deborah Thomas is an Australian magazine editor and businesswoman.

== Career ==
Deborah Thomas' career in magazine publishing started at Cleo magazine as beauty and lifestyle editor in 1987. She became deputy editor at Cleo in 1990, and was editor at Mode in 1992 (now Harper's Bazaar) followed by Elle magazine in 1994, until she took over the editorship at Cleo from 1997 to 1999.

Following Cleo, Thomas became editor-in-chief of The Australian Women's Weekly in 1999 and was awarded Magazine of the Year as well as Editor of the Year in 2002. After nearly 10 years at The Weekly, Thomas became the director of media, public affairs & brand development at Bauer Media. She was also executive director of the Bangkok Post Media /ACP joint venture in Thailand.

In April 2015, she was appointed as chief executive officer of Ardent Leisure. A few months after an accident that killed four people on the Thunder River Rapids Ride at Dreamworld, in 2017 Thomas resigned from her position as CEO of Ardent Leisure, and later left the company.

Thomas was appointed in her current role as CEO of national children's cancer charity, Camp Quality in January 2020.

Thomas was a non-executive director of the federal government's National Breast and Ovarian Cancer Centre. She has been involved in not-for-profit organisations such as the Royal Hospital for Women Foundation, Father Chris Riley's Youth Off The Streets and is a founding patron of the Taronga Conservation Foundation and was chair of the Ensemble Theatre Foundation.

In 2012, Thomas was elected to local government as a councillor for the Municipality of Woollahra, completing her five-year term in August 2017.

Thomas is a member of Chief Executive Women, and she founded "Gold Week" for the Sydney Children's Hospital, the signature fundraising event for the hospital with a telethon held annually.

== Selected publications ==
- Editor and co-author of Surrender: The Story of Gaia Retreat and Spa (2020). Publishers Olivia Newton-John and Gregg Cave
- Thomas, Deborah & Kirstie Clements (2014). The Australian Women's Weekly Fashion: The First 50 Years. Canberra: National Library of Australia.
- Thomas, Deborah (March 2014). "Fifty Years of Fashion : The Australian Women's Weekly". The National Library of Australia Magazine. 6 (1): 2–5. Archived from the original on 26 May 2015.
