= Dreamworld Express =

Railway line in Australia

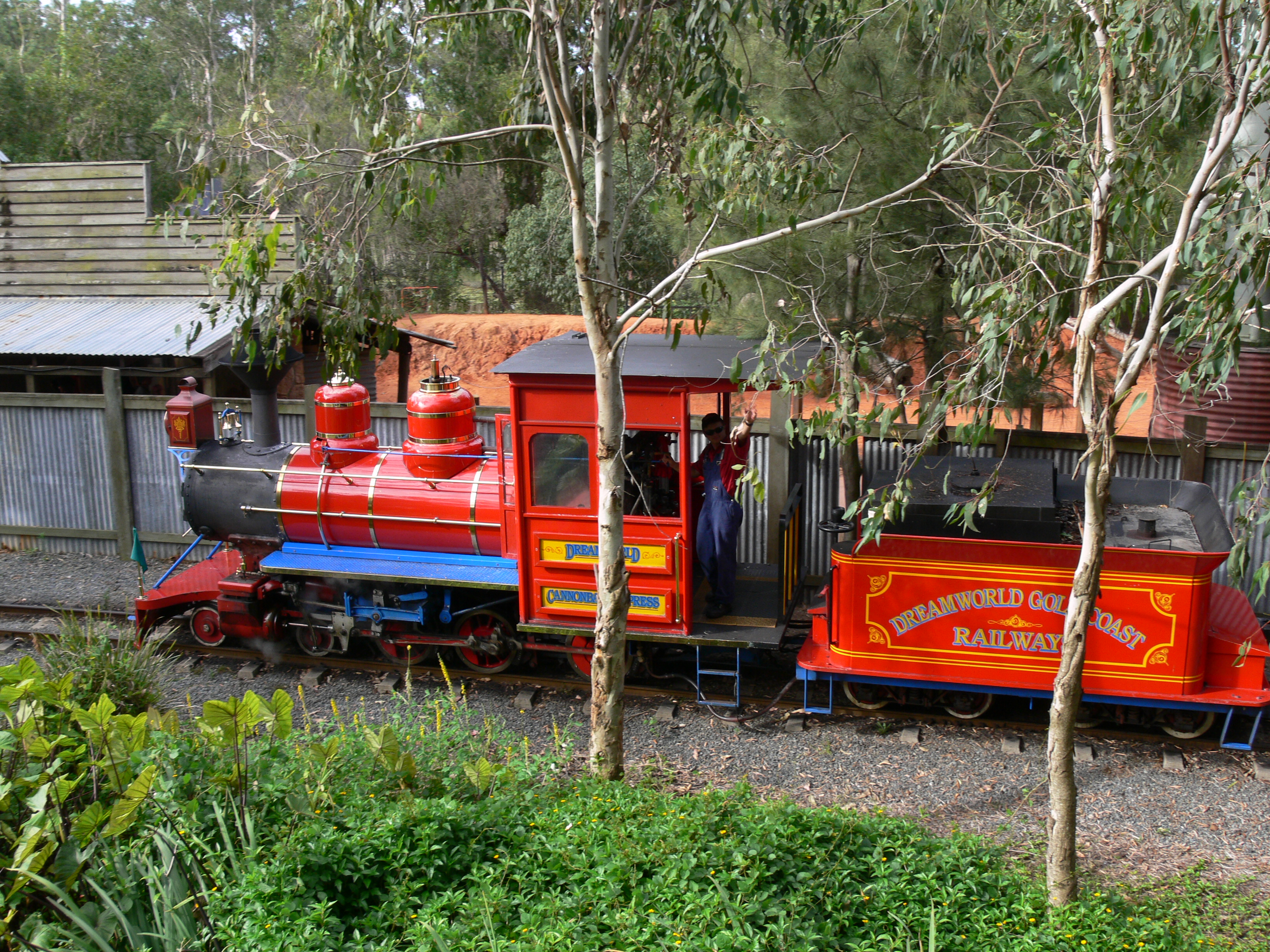
- The Dreamworld Express' Baldwin locomotive.

Dreamworld
- Area: Main Street, Corroboree, Gold Rush Country, Rivertown
- Coordinates: 27°51′46.78″S 153°18′59.91″E
- Status: Operating
- Opening date: 15 December 1981

Ride statistics
- Attraction type: 4-6-0 steam outline diesel hydrostatic locomotive
- Manufacturer: C&S
- Model: Train ride
- Length: 1,500 m (4,900 ft)
- Speed: 6 km/h (3.7 mph)
- Capacity: 320 riders per hour
- Vehicle type: Train
- Vehicles: 1 locomotive; 3 passenger carriages
- Duration: 20 minutes (full circuit)
- Stations: 2
- Riders per train: 108
- Previous name: Cannonball Express; Dreamworld Railway
- Wheelchair accessible

The Dreamworld Express is a 2 ft (610 mm) narrow gauge railway located at the Dreamworld theme park on the Gold Coast, Queensland in Australia.

== History ==
The Dreamworld Express opened with Dreamworld on 15 December 1981, as the Cannonball Express. At the time, the railway only featured a single stop in Main Street. A steam locomotive built by Baldwin Locomotive Works in 1917 was purchased and 3,000 metres (9,800 ft) of track was said to have been laid to develop the ride. This figure must relate to the quantity of rail used as reference to maps show that the line is only about 1.5 kilometres (0.93 mi) in length. The Baldwin locomotive was originally used during the First World War in France before being relocated to Queensland for use on the cane fields. At the time of its opening, the Cannonball Express was said to be the Longest privately owned railway in Australia. However, this was clearly incorrect. It is not even the longest privately owned passenger railway. A second steam locomotive, built by Perry Engineering in 1951, which had also seen service at a Queensland sugar mill, was purchased and put into service on the railway. Until the late 1990s, the railway operated with both steam locomotives in peak periods. The railway then shifted to operations on a rotational basis, with one train being serviced while the other would operate normally. The two locomotives could each tow carriages to cater for up to 160 passengers at a time. A set of covered cars were mostly used on the railway, with a set of uncovered carriages, now disposed of, being rarely used unless both trains were operating. A carriage with disabled access was always added to the end of at least one of the operating trains.

After Easter 2013, Dreamworld began operating the train only on weekends and school holidays. The park subsequently replaced the two steam locomotives with a diesel replacement. The diesel masquerades as a steam locomotive and was built by ride manufacturers C&S in Italy. The ride now operates as the Dreamworld Express.

On 26 January 2016, Dreamworld reintroduced the Baldwin locomotive as a one-off event. Subsequently, it was announced that the steam locomotive would operate on the first Saturday of every month and on other occasions.

During late 2020 and 2021, the Dreamworld Express was temporarily closed for a re-routing of the tracks in order to make way for Dreamworld's new Steel Taipan roller coaster. Tracks near The Giant Drop and Rocky Hollow Station and the train sheds were removed due to the close proximity to Steel Taipan's construction site. The ride was initially marked as temporarily closed due to restrictions related to the COVID-19 pandemic. On 17 July 2021, Dreamworld announced $1,000,000 refurbishment on the Dreamworld Express. The refurbishment included the acquisition of new custom train carriages built by a world-class train manufacturer. which feature fold-up seating to allow for better wheelchair and pram accessibility.

The ride reopened on 1 July 2022 and now runs in the opposite direction.

== Route and stations ==
Since reopening in July 2022, the railway has been modified with a shorter layout and a reversed (clockwise) travel direction. Currently, only two of the original four stations are inactive. The remaining stations have been modified to include raised platforms for enhanced accessibility.

There are four stations located throughout the park, however, only two stations are currently active. The first is Central Park Station located at the end of Main Street at the bottom of the hill. The railway then crosses between Steel Taipan, Motocoaster and The Giant Drop before passing the former Rocky Hollow Station located near the former Rocky Hollow Log Ride in Gold Rush Country. The railway then travels alongside the Murrissippi River and passes part of the Dreamworld Corroboree area before arriving at Corroboree Station with entry and exit via Prestos Training Cafe and Bunya Trading Gift Shop. The train then passes the rest of the Dreamworld Corroboree area and the Dreamworld Woolshed before passing a set of boom gates. The train then passes the former Billabong Station which is located between the Corroboree and ABC Kids World, next to the Billabong Buffet Restaurant. The train then navigates between Tiger Island, ABC Kids World and the former building for the Tower of Terror II before passing through another set of boom gates and arriving back at Central Park Station.

This railway is slightly based on the Disneyland Railroad, with the Baldwin locomotive resembling the #4 Ernest S. Marsh locomotive (appropriate enough, it also uses #4), the cars designed with the Excursion III design, and there being four station stops.

Dreamworld Express stations

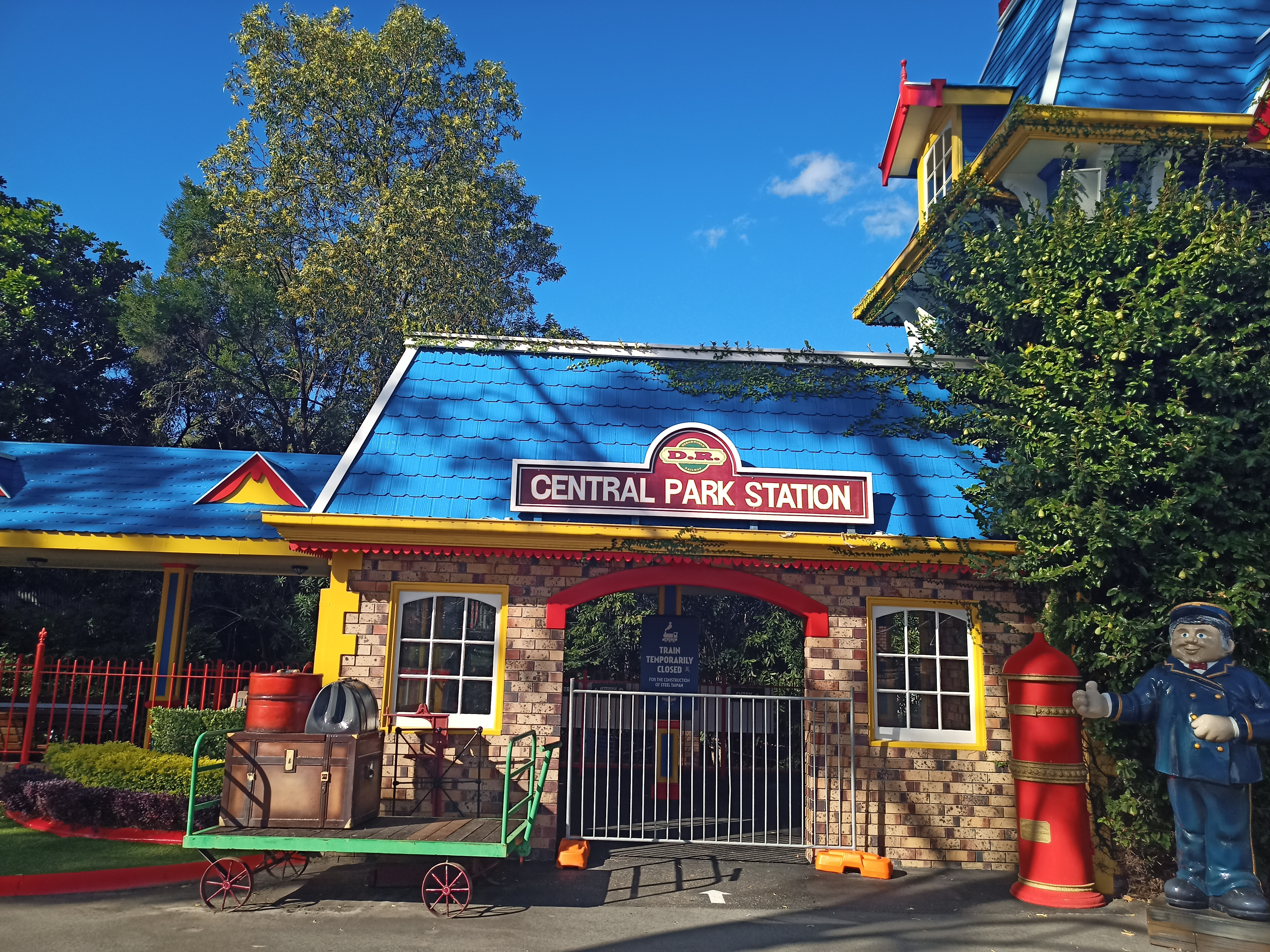
Central Park Station (Main Street)

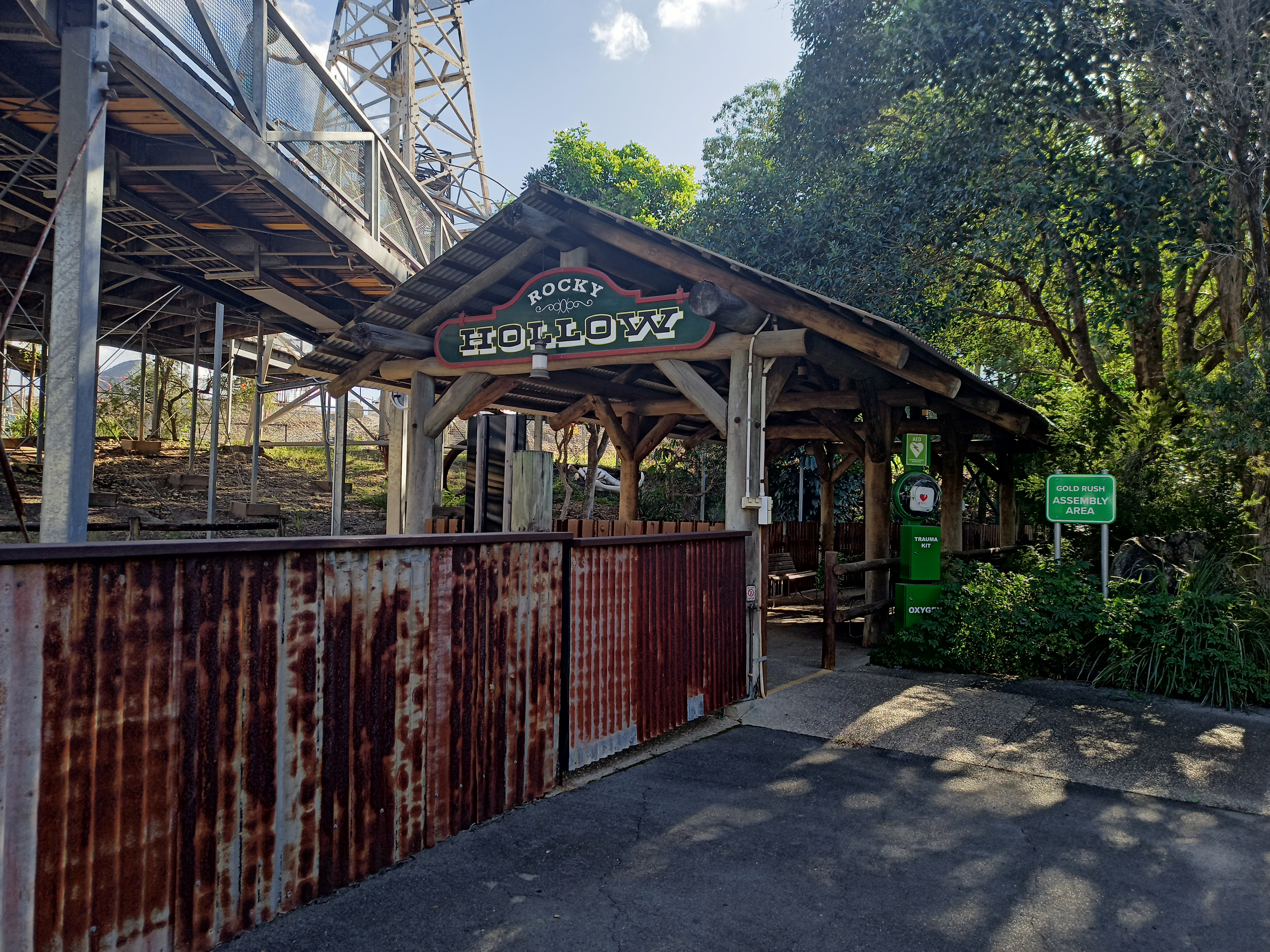
Rocky Hollow Station (Gold Rush Country) (Note: Station currently not in use.)

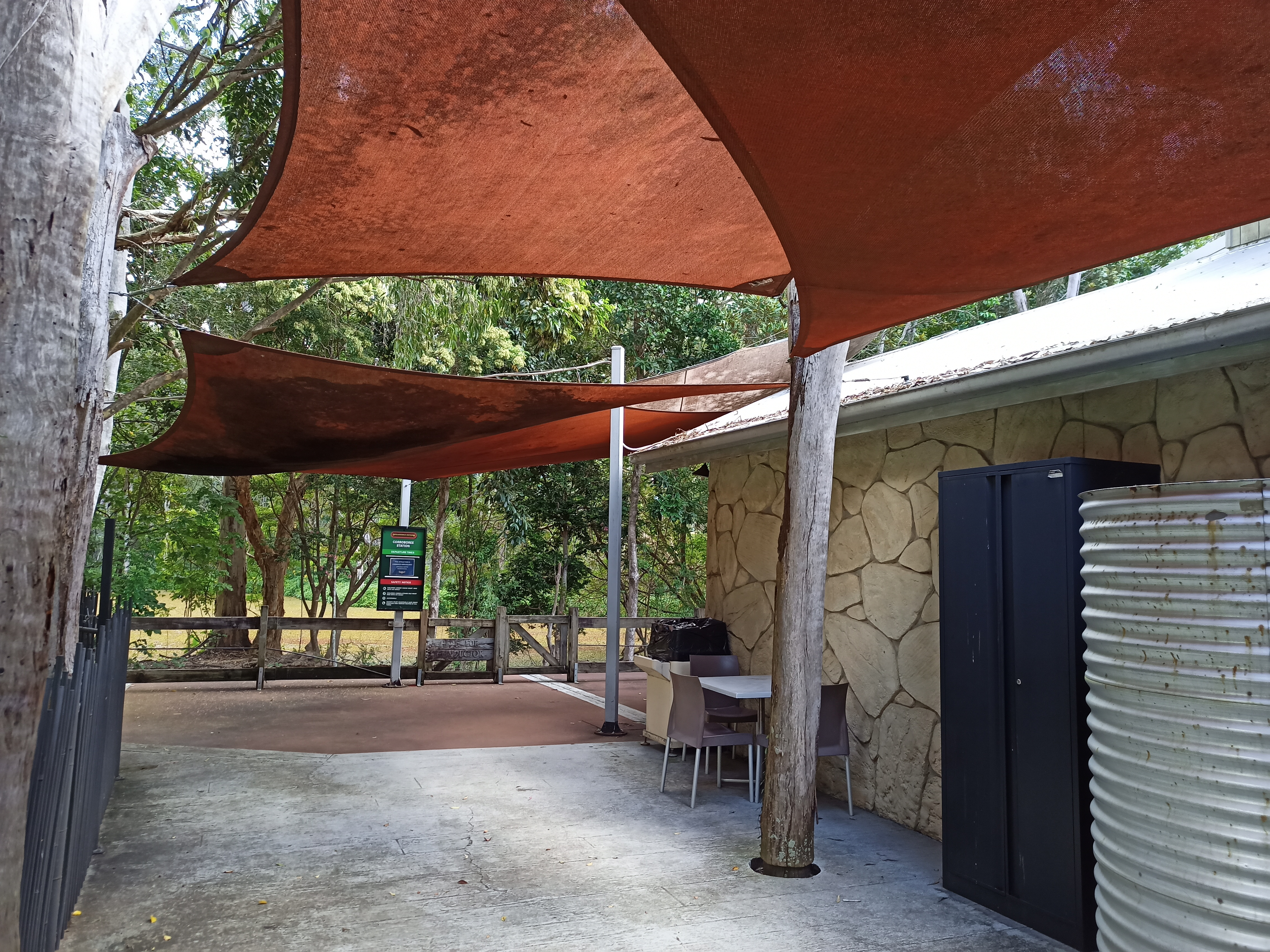
Corroboree Station (Corroboree)

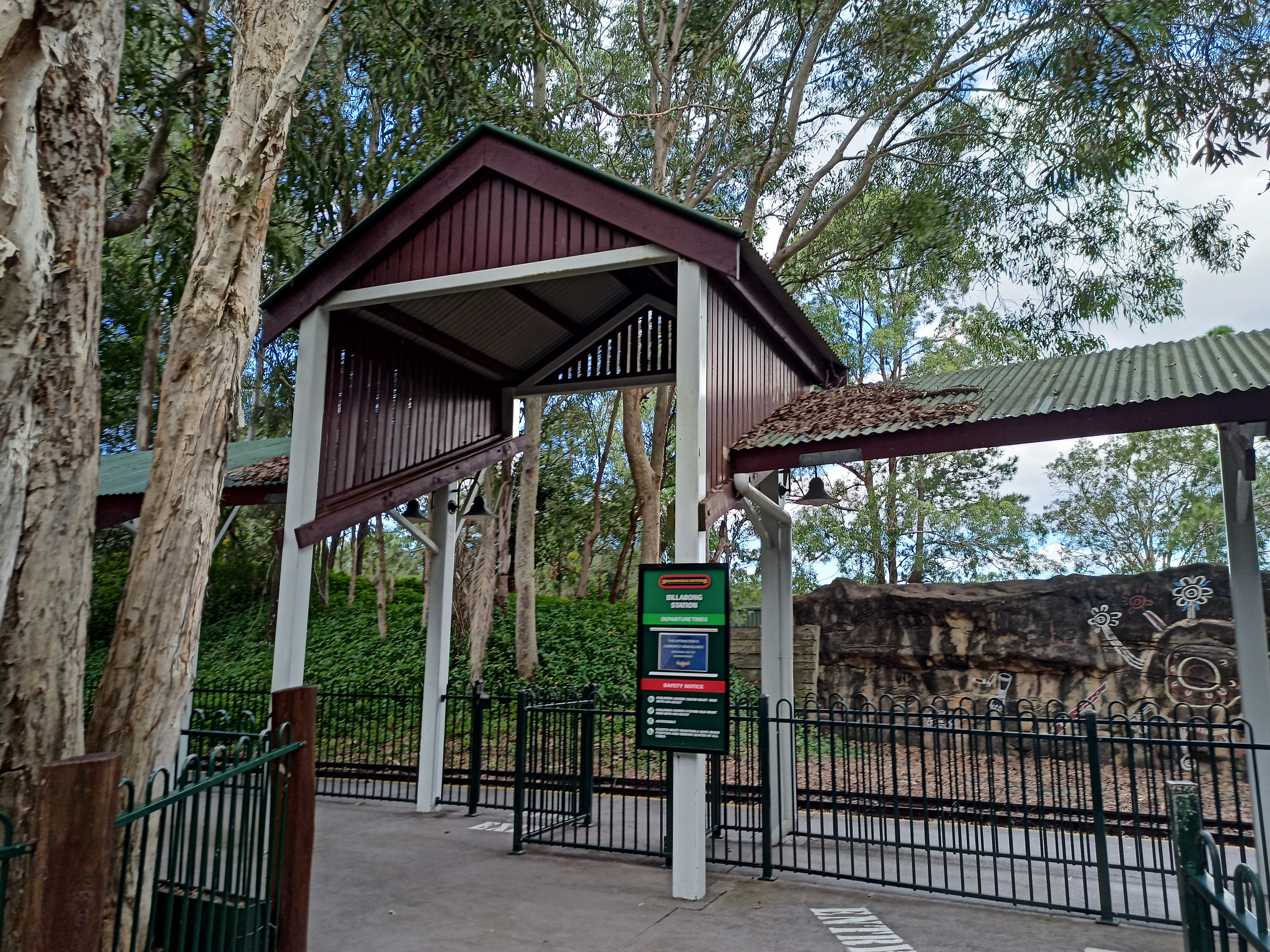
Billabong Station (ABC Kids World) (Note: Station currently not in use.)

=== Historical features ===
Prior to the 2021 refurbishment, the railway travelled in an anti-clockwise direction, servicing four stations (Central Park, Billabong, Corroboree and Rocky Hollow).

From Rocky Hollow Station, the track passed around the former location of the Blue Lagoon water park as well as Dreamworld Studios where Big Brother Australia was filmed. It then returned to Central Park Station in Main Street after passing the railway maintenance sheds.

The route also previously featured a tunnel and waterfall near the Billabong Station. Remnants of the tunnel are still in-situ and include indigenous-themed artwork.

At times, the ride also included various simulated hold-ups, in which comedic bushranger characters would attempt to hijack and rob the train before being arrested and detained by police.

== Rolling Stock ==
The Baldwin locomotive was originally used during the First World War in France before being relocated to Queensland for use on the cane fields.

A second steam locomotive, built by Perry Engineering in 1951, which had also seen service at a Queensland sugar mill, was purchased and put into service on the railway. Until the late 1990s, the railway operated with both steam locomotives in peak periods. The railway then shifted to operations on a rotational basis, with one train being serviced while the other would operate normally.

The two locomotives could each tow carriages to cater for up to 160 passengers at a time. A set of covered cars were mostly used on the railway, with a set of uncovered carriages, now disposed of, being rarely used unless both trains were operating. A carriage with disabled access was always added to the end of at least one of the operating trains.

The steam locomotives were replaced with a diesel replica in 2013. The Perry Locomotive was relocated to the Australian Narrow Gauge Railway Museum Society (ANGRMS) at Woodford, Queensland, where it remains under restoration. The Baldwin locomotive was retained by Dreamworld and is currently on display outside Central Park Station, albeit with the tender removed.

New passenger carriages with accessible seating were introduced in July 2022, following the refurbishment of the ride.

Class	Image	Type	Number in service	Wheel arrangements	Manufacturer	Carriages	Built	Notes
Locomotives
C&S Custom		Diesel Locomotive	1	2-Bo	C&S	—	2013	
Baldwin Class 10-12-D		Steam Locomotive	—	4-6-0	Baldwin Locomotive Works	—	1917	Retired from service in 2013. Preserved outside Central Park Station.
Perry Engineering	Perry Engineering Locomotive	Steam Locomotive	—	0-6-2T	Perry Engineering	—	1951	Retired from service in 2013. Obtained in 2014 by Australian Narrow Gauge Railway Museum Society (ANGRMS) in Woodford, Queensland. Currently under restoration.
Carriages
Severn Lamb custom		Passenger Carriage	3	Unknown	Severn Lamb	3	2021	

== See also ==
- Rail transport in Walt Disney Parks and Resorts
- Sea World Monorail System
