= Coast Entertainment =

Australian leisure venue operator

Coast Entertainment Holdings
- Formerly: Macquarie Leisure Trust; Ardent Leisure Group
- Type: Public
- Traded as: ASX: CEH
- Industry: Leisure and entertainment attraction operator
- Founded: 11 June 1998
- Headquarters: Milsons Point, New South Wales, Australia
- Area served: Australia
- Key people: Greg Yong (Group CEO) Gary Weiss (Chairman)
- Revenue: A$96.4m ▲ (2025)
- Operating income: A$(3.4m) ▲ (2025)
- Net income: A$(0.1m) ▲ (2025)
- Total assets: A$249.3m ▼ (2025)
- Number of employees: 850
- Subsidiaries: Dreamworld; WhiteWater World; SkyPoint Observation Deck
- Website: coastentertainment.com.au

Coast Entertainment Holdings Limited (formerly Ardent Leisure Group and Macquarie Leisure Trust) is an Australian leisure company. It operates Dreamworld, the largest theme park in Australia, WhiteWater World, a water park adjacent to Dreamworld, and the SkyPoint Observation Deck on the Gold Coast, Queensland, Australia.

== History ==
=== Macquarie Leisure Trust (1998–2009) ===
Coast Entertainment began in 1998 as Macquarie Leisure Trust, a listed trust managed by Macquarie Leisure Operations, a subsidiary of Macquarie Group. The trust acquired the existing Dreamworld theme park in July 1998 for A$100.3 million. In November 1999, it purchased d'Albora Marinas, a provider of berth and marina facilities, for A$36.3 million.

Macquarie Leisure acquired the Cabarita Point Marina for its D'Albora Marinas business in January 2004. In October 2004, Macquarie Leisure acquired AMF Bowling's Australian business for A$67.4 million. In August 2006, it announced that it would acquire the Texas-based family entertainment centre operator Main Event Entertainment. Later that year, it opened WhiteWater World, a new water park constructed on the Gold Coast.

In July 2007, Macquarie Leisure announced it would acquire Goodlife Health Clubs for $60 million. At the time, Goodlife had 18 health clubs across Queensland, Victoria and New South Wales.

=== Ardent Leisure (2009–2023) ===
In August 2009, management of Macquarie Leisure Trust was internalised and it was renamed Ardent Leisure Group, ending its connection with Macquarie Group. In November 2009, Ardent Leisure acquired the QDeck observation deck for A$13.3 million.

In April 2015, Deborah Thomas, former editor of Cleo and other magazines, was appointed as chief executive officer (CEO) of Ardent Leisure. Thomas was replaced on 9 June 2017 when Simon Kelly was appointed as CEO and Managing Director.

In August 2016, Ardent sold the Goodlife Health Clubs business to Quadrant Private Equity for $260 million. In December that year, Ardent Leisure sold its d'Albora Marinas division for A$126 million to a special purpose vehicle owned by Goldman Sachs and Balmain Corporation. In December 2017, Ardent sold its Australian bowling and arcade businesses (AMF, Kingpin and Playtime) to The Entertainment and Education Group for A$160 million.

In June 2020, RedBird Capital Partners acquired a 24.2% stake in Main Event. On 6 April 2022, competitor Dave & Buster's announced its intent to wholly acquire Main Event from Ardent and RedBird for US$835 million (A$1.1 billion); former Main Event CEO Chris Morris was retained, and was made the CEO of Dave and Buster's.

=== Coast Entertainment (2023–present) ===
Ardent Leisure changed its name to Coast Entertainment Holdings in December 2023.

Coast lodged an application with the Gold Coast City Council on 18 September 2023 to rezone and develop three parcels of land owned by Coast on which Dreamworld and WhiteWater World operate.

On 26 August 2025 the Planning Minister proposed to call in the development. On 26 October 2025, the Planning Minister called in the development. On 21 November 2025, the Planning Minister issued Coast with an Information Request.

== Portfolio ==
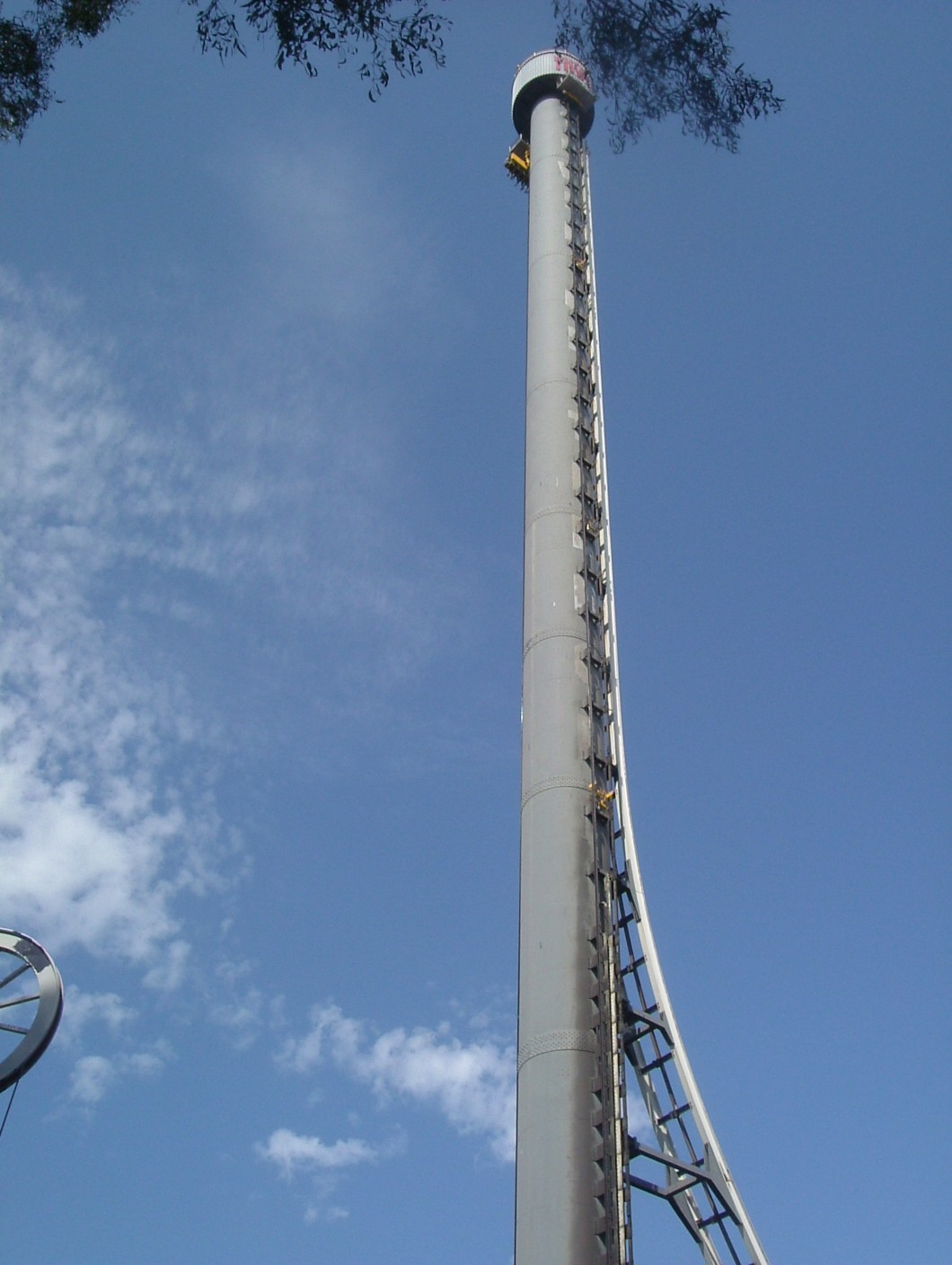
The Dreamworld Tower at Dreamworld which houses the Tower of Terror II and the Giant Drop.

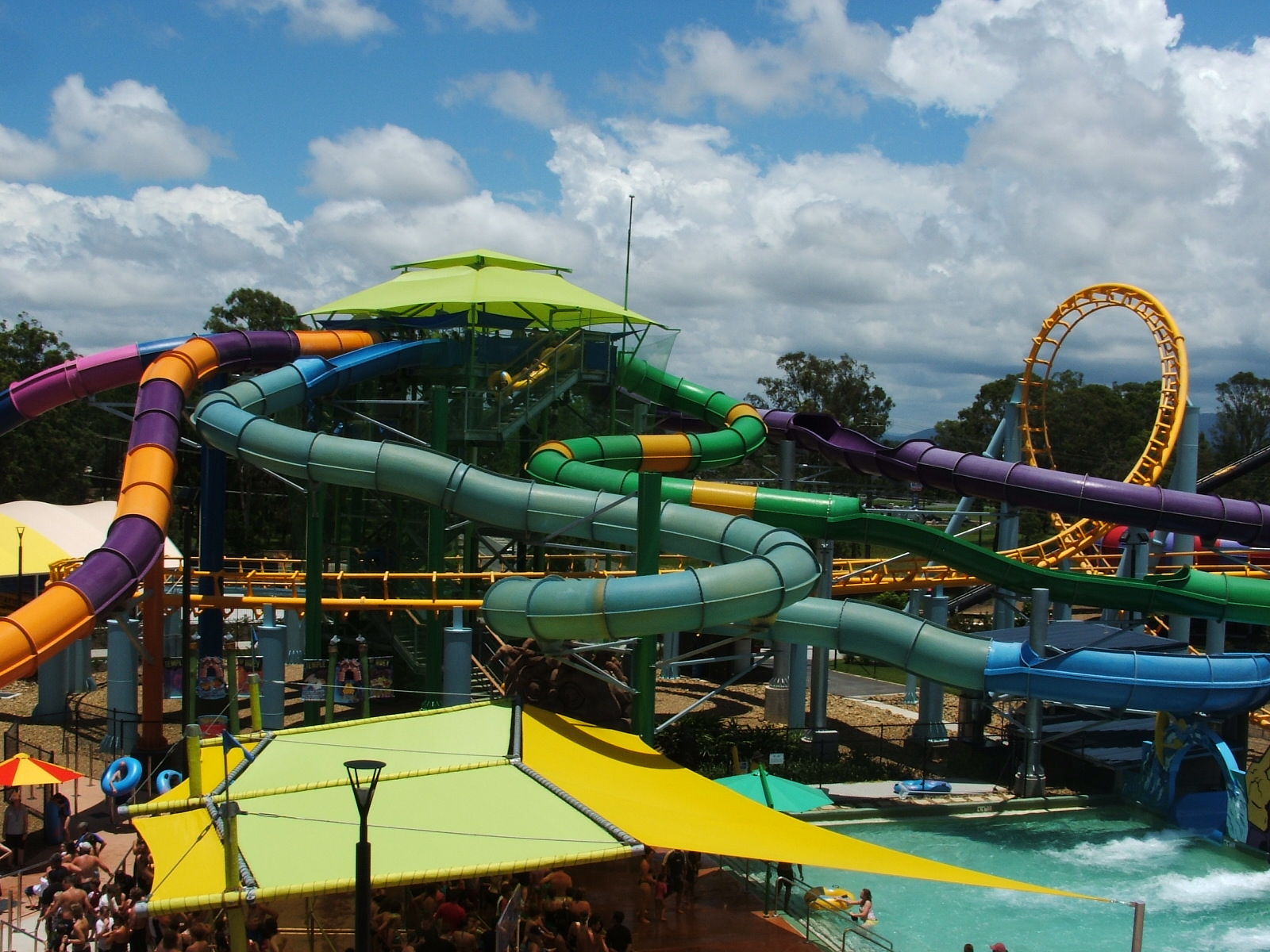
The Temple of Huey and Little Rippers at WhiteWater World interacting with Dreamworld's Cyclone.

=== Theme parks ===
Coast Entertainment owns and operates the Dreamworld theme park on the Gold Coast. Dreamworld has over 40 rides and attractions.

Coast also owns WhiteWater World (opened December 2006) as an adjacent water park and QDeck (acquired November 2009) which was renamed SkyPoint in 2010.

=== Attendance and Performance ===
Coast Entertainment's Theme Park division's financial performance and attendance since its acquisition in 1998. Note this does not include other categories of revenue such as the previously held Main Entertainment business.

FY	Theme park revenue (A$m)	EBITDA (A$m)	Total attendance	Notes
1998	52.1	11.7	1,114,401	
1999	54.2	16.3	1,099,521	
2000	55.1	16.0	1,036,513	
2001				
2002	56.7	14.9	1,059,000	EBITDA and attendance in FY2003 Annual Financial Report
2003	59.1	17.2	1,093,300	
2004	67.7	21.7	1,234,611	
2005	77.7	27.4	1,352,803	
2006	84.0	31.0	1,400,000	
2007	96.7	37.6		WhiteWater World opened
2008	107.9			
2009			1,919,630	Attendance from the FY10 Full Year Results Presentation
2010	98.6		2,103,276	SkyPoint purchased
2011	101.6	32.3	2,220,334*	EBITDA from FY2012 Annual Report. *Estimate based on FY2012 attendance falling 21.8% (per FY2012 Annual Report)
2012	93.7	28.9	1,736,301	Revenue, EBITDA and attendance from FY2013 Annual Report
2013	97.1	30.5	1,874,951	
2014	100.1	32.8	2,042,164	
2015	99.6	32.0	2,281,606	
2016	107.6	34.7	2,413,937	
2017	70.9	−3.4	1,662,992	Thunder River Rapids Ride incident
2018	69.9	−91.1	1,657,969	
2019	67.1	−19.8	1,459,621	
2020	54.5	−33.9	1,153,296	Covid-19
2021	36.0	−11.1	743,860	Covid-19
2022	49.5	−14.4	880,833	
2023	83.9	3.1	1,220,933	
2024	87.0	2.3	1,395,650	
2025	96.4	13.9	1,551,964	

== Amusement Park Licence ==
In response to the Thunder River Rapids Ride incident, the Queensland Government introduced the Work Health and Safety (Amusement Devices—Public Safety) Amendment Regulation 2019 requiring major theme parks, including Dreamworld, to have a major amusement park licence.

The legislation required the regulator to be satisfied that the operator is able to ensure that amusement devices at the major amusement park do not expose, or potentially expose, a person to a serious risk to health or safety.

Coast Entertainment (then Ardent Leisure) was granted Queensland's first Major Amusement Park Licence by Workplace Health and Safety Queensland in August 2022.

== See also ==
- Dreamworld
- SkyPoint Observation Deck
- WhiteWater World
