= Sky Princess =

Sky Princess may refer to:

- Kingdom Coaster, a wooden roller coaster in Dutch Wonderland near Lancaster, Pennsylvania, opened in 1992 and called the Sky Princess before 2007
- Atlantic Star (cruise ship), an Australian cruise ship formerly known as Sky Princess, built in 1984, laid up in 2010, sold to shipbreaker in Aliağa, Turkey, and renamed Antic
- Sky Princess (2019), a Royal-class cruise ship operating for Princess Cruises since October 2019
