= S&S – Sansei Technologies =

American themed entertainment company

S&S – Worldwide
- Industry: Manufacturing
- Predecessor: Arrow Development; Arrow HUSS; Arrow Dynamics; S&S Sports Inc. S&S Power
- Founded: 1994
- Founder: Stan Checketts
- Headquarters: Logan, Utah, United States
- Area served: Worldwide
- Products: Amusement rides, roller coasters
- Parent: Sansei Technologies
- Website: s-s.com

The former S&S Worldwide logo

S&S Worldwide (formerly S&S Sports Power, S&S Original Amusements, S&S Power, and S&S – Sansei Technologies) is an American company known for its pneumatically powered amusement rides and roller coaster designing.

== History ==
=== Establishment ===
Stan Checketts with his wife Sandy (Stan & Sandy) founded S&S Sports Power, Inc in 1994 in Logan, Utah. This was a side project from their main business, Sports Tower, Inc., which had been founded in the late 1980s. Sports Tower had manufactured bungee jumping and trampoline equipment. S&S Sports Power was founded to manufacture air-powered drop towers, which became the main stay of the company. S&S Sports was sold in 1996.

In 2002, S&S began looking for opportunities to expand their business, citing acquisitions as the best method to do so. Following the bankruptcy filing of wooden roller coaster manufacturer Custom Coasters International (CCI), S&S hired founder Denise Dinn-Larrick and several other former CCI employees to start a new wooden coaster division for the company. The division was shut down two years later after manufacturing only four wooden coasters.

In October 2002, S&S founded S&S Arrow, a limited liability company which purchased the assets of the bankrupt Arrow Dynamics.

In 2006, S&S Power opened Celebration Centre, a Family Entertainment Center featuring a number of S&S rides and prototypes. The facility was later sold and is currently no longer operating.

=== Company ownership ===
On August 25, 2006, S&S Power, Inc. announced that Stan Checketts and Gene Mulvihill, both original founding partners of S&S, had formed a group to purchase a controlling interest of S&S. The negotiations took several months. CEO Checketts was to direct the company based on the same principles upon which it was founded: "...to provide the amusement industry with thrilling, high-quality rides the entire family can enjoy." Checketts also announced that the business operations of S&S would remain under the direction of Rich Allen, who would continue in his role as chief operating officer.

In February 2009, Larsen MacColl Partners acquired a significant equity interest in S&S, including all shares previously owned by Checketts. The Koffman family and affiliated shareholders were to maintain their ownership interest. Checketts ended his consulting relationship with the company in order to pursue business interests with Soaring Eagle Zipline Inc., of Logan Utah. More than a decade later, Stan Checketts, aged 80, died on January 2, 2022, at his home in Providence, Utah.

In November 2012, S&S Worldwide Inc., entered into a binding agreement with Sansei Technologies Co., Ltd., of Osaka, Japan, whereby Sansei acquired 77.3% interest in S&S. Signage at the 2012 and 2013 IAAPA Attractions Expos promoted the new company as S&S – Sansei Technologies, with Sansei becoming its sole owner by late 2014. On March 30, 2018, it was announced that Sansei Technologies had also acquired amusement ride manufacturer Vekoma.

=== Portfolio ===
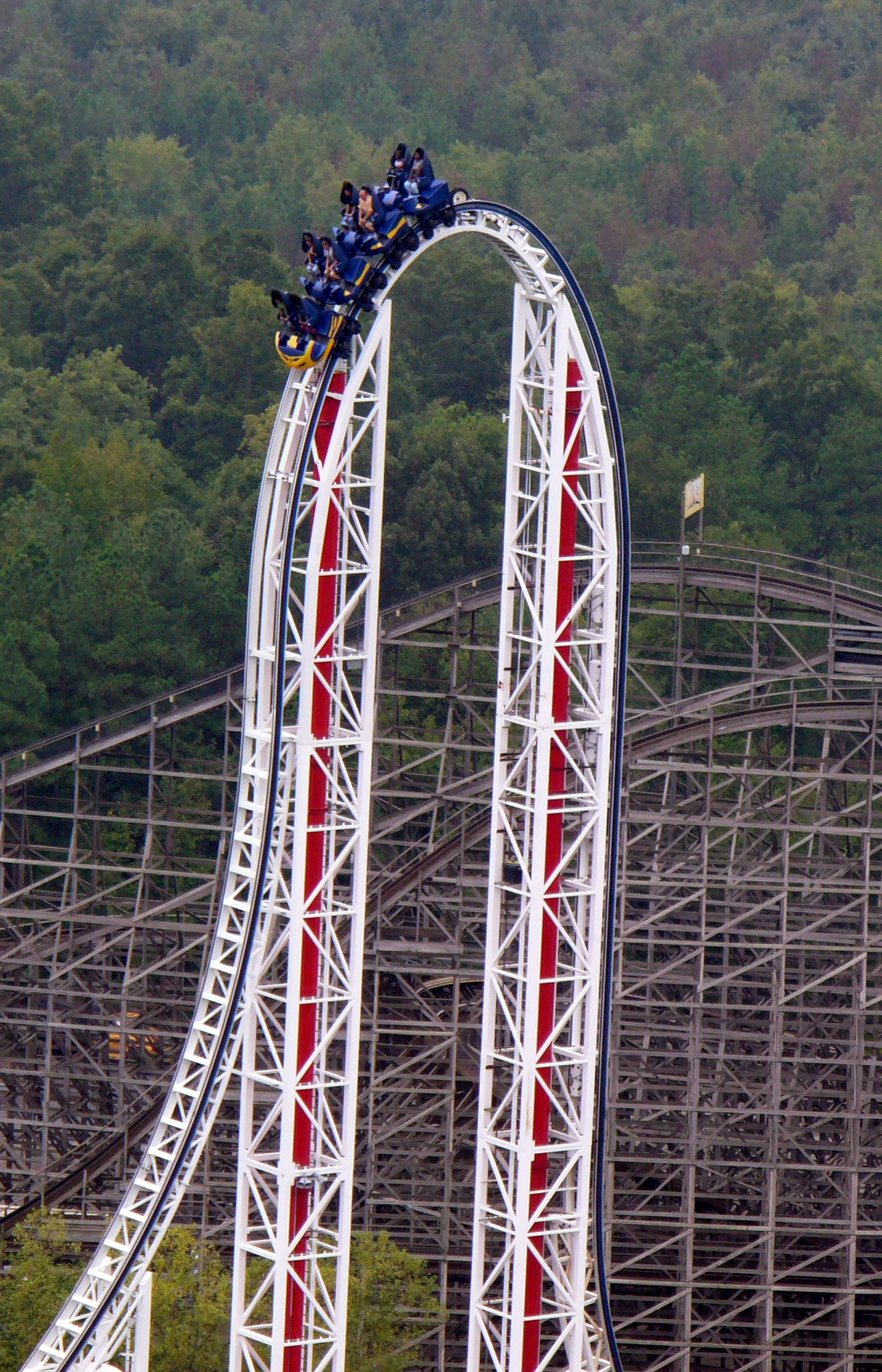
Hypersonic XLC at Kings Dominion, which operated from 2001 to 2007

Pneumatically powered attractions quickly became the company's trademark offering. The Space Shot was introduced in 1995, using compressed air cylinders to accelerate riders up the tower at high speed. Prototypes were sold to Reino Aventura and D&D Amusements before the model was refined and sold in mass supply. Subsequent ride models — the Turbo Drop tower and Screamin' Swing – were respectively introduced in 1996 and 2004.

The company moved to utilize their pneumatic technology on roller coaster launches with the Thrust Air 2000, which used refrigerated, compressed air to achieve a high-acceleration launch. A pair opened in 2001 in the form of Hypersonic XLC at Kings Dominion and Do-Dodonpa at Fuji-Q Highland, the latter of which achieved a world-best coaster acceleration of 172 km/h (107 mph) at the time. Hypersonic XLC was be retired and put up for sale in 2007, while Do-Dodonpa was partially rebuilt in 2017 before closing in 2021. A newer pneumatic launch coaster model was rolled out at the end of the decade. The first was Ring Racer at the Nürburgring race track, which operated for four days in 2013 before being declared economically unviable.

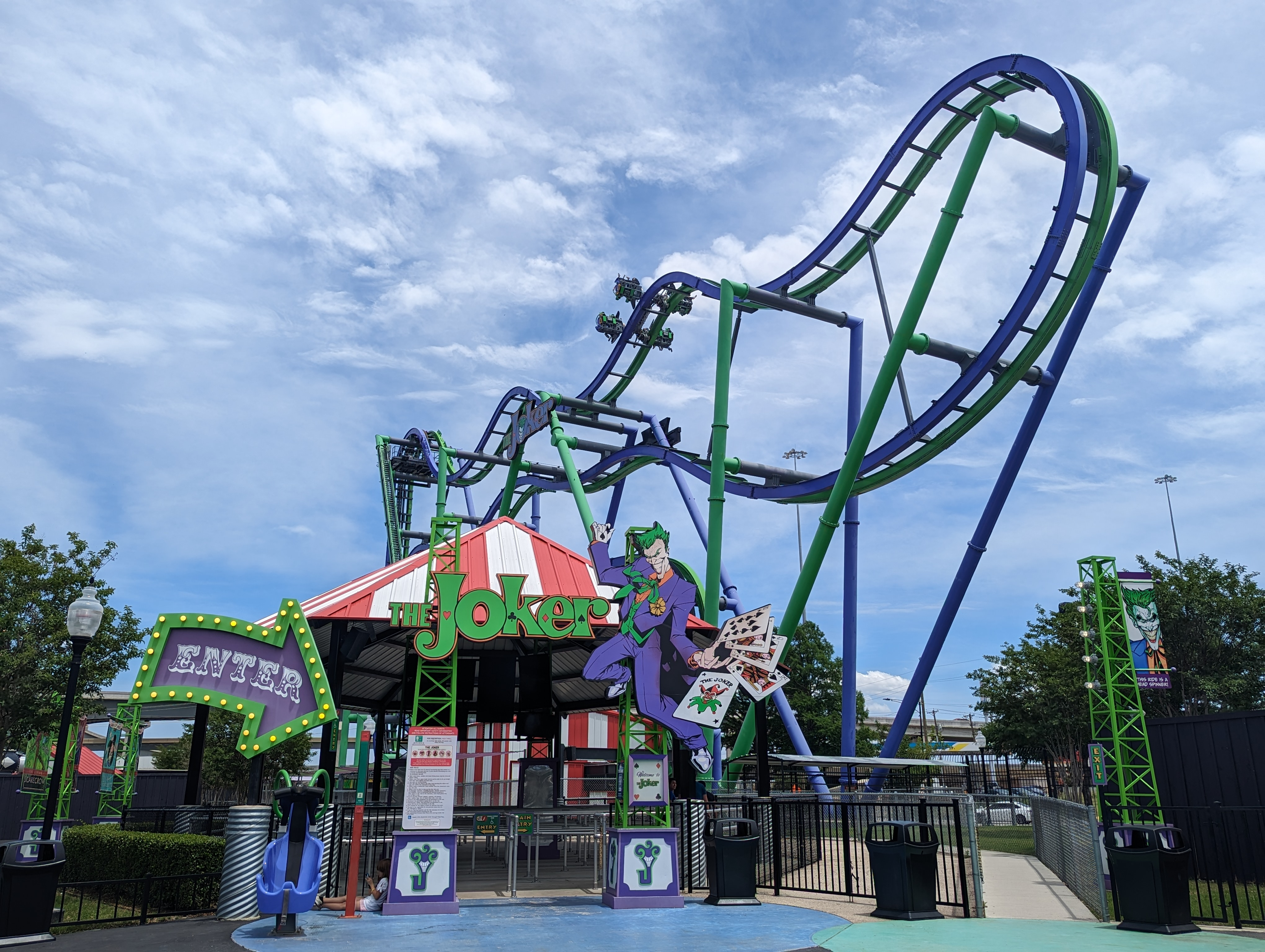
Joker at Six Flags Over Texas, one of many 4-D Free Spins rolled out to Six Flags parks

Outside of their pneumatic products, S&S continued to introduce new designs. In 2008 the company introduced El Loco, a coaster design capable of packing an extreme layout into a compact footprint. Beginning with Steel Hawg at Indiana Beach, a new El Loco was built almost annually until 2014, with each ride seemingly modified to include a steeper drop than the one before it. At that time, S&S introduced the 4-D Free Spin, a smaller and vertically stacked version of previous 4th Dimension coasters. The first installation — Batman: The Ride at Six Flags Fiesta Texas — made its debut in 2015 and generated high demand for the model, with production capabilities fully booked several years in advance.

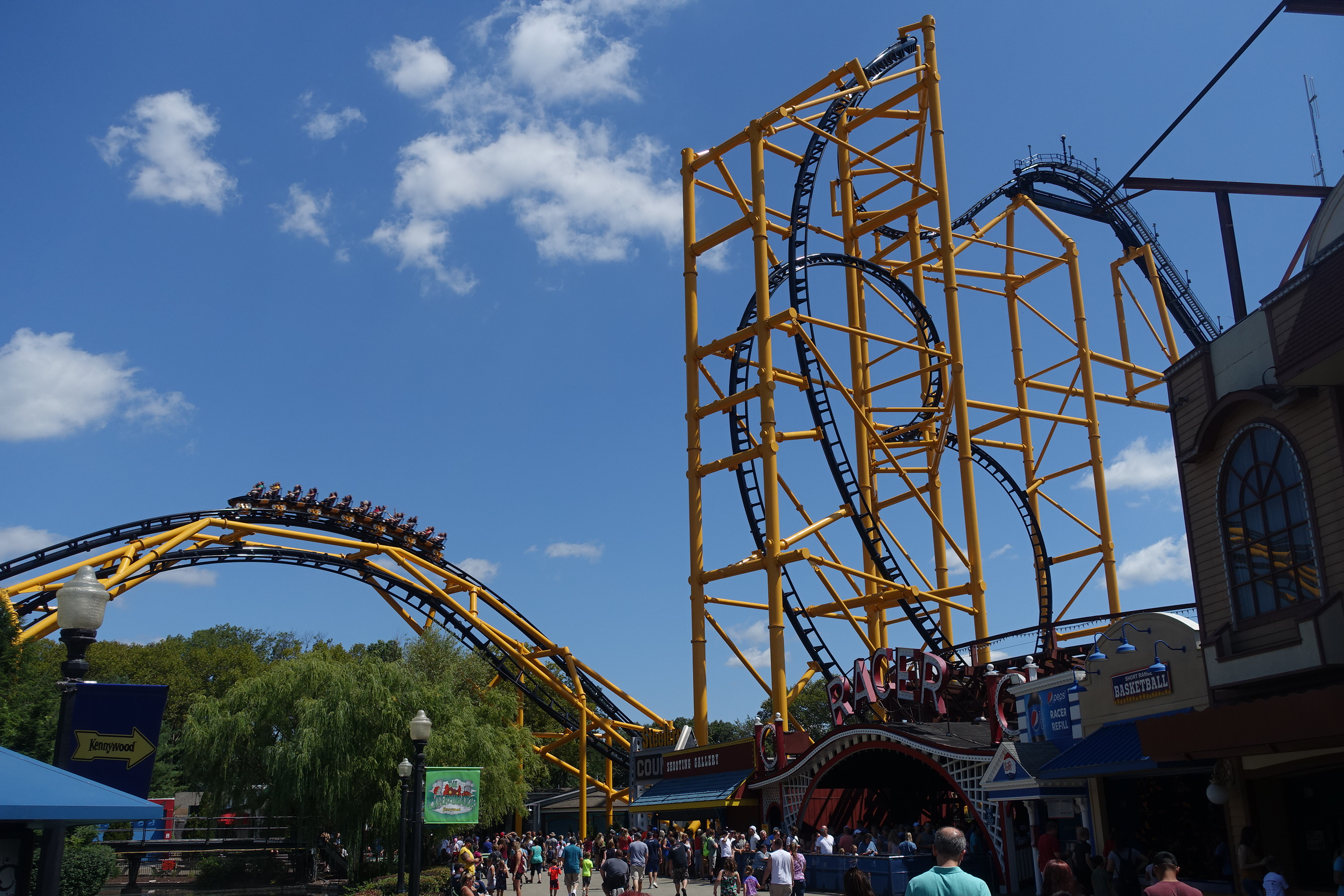
Steel Curtain at Kennywood, a looping hypercoaster that has been plagued with mechanical and structural issues

Some roller coasters produced by S&S have faced issues leading to delays or later modifications. Merlin's Mayhem, a family suspended coaster, was built in 2017 at Dutch Wonderland but ultimately wasn't ready until 2018 due to construction delays. GaleForce, a compact launched coaster at Playland's Castaway Cove, was unable to open in 2016 as intended due to misaligned track pieces not allowing the car to line up with the launch stators. Although GaleForce opened in 2017 following adjustments, all of the track was replaced the following winter at the expense of S&S. In 2019, S&S built Steel Curtain at Kennywood, a 220-foot (67 m) tall looping coaster. Throughout its lifetime the coaster has operated sporadically due to structural problems. Steel Curtain was eventually closed for the 2023 season as the park sought to address these issues. In addition to this, China's 2019 tariffs on ride parts and the economic impact of the COVID-19 pandemic resulted in a slowdown of sales for S&S.

S&S introduced the Axis Coaster concept in 2019, where riders are seated on an elevated swivel that can swing riders above or below the track, regardless of its banking. This hence allows for layouts and track elements not feasible on more conventional attractions. A prototype was set up at S&S' testing facility in Utah and three were eventually purchased by Saudi Entertainment Ventures, a subsidiary of Saudi Arabia's Public Investment Fund. Opening in 2025/26, each will have a separate design and be located at Transformers entertainment centers in Riyadh, Dammam, and Jeddah.

== Types of amusement rides ==
=== Roller coasters ===
Model	First produced	Description
4th Dimension	2006	Variation of a wing coaster in which seats are able to rotate along the pitch axis at 360 degrees. The track is laid out like a traditional sit-down roller coaster with additional rails to control seat rotation.
4-D Free Spin	2015	Variation of a wing coaster in which seats are able to rotate along the pitch axis at 360 degrees. The track does not veer off or bank in any way, as opposed to S&S' other 4th Dimension model.
Air Launch Coaster	2010	Name given to a variety of roller coasters utilizing compressed air launch systems.
Axis Coaster	2019 (prototype)	Steel roller coaster utilising unique trains which rotate freely (although regulated by magnets) through a layout with multiple inversions. This coaster model currently only exists at S&S' testing facility in Utah.
El Loco	2008	Slower-paced roller coaster containing a beyond-vertical drop and thin rails.
Family Inverted Coaster	2018	An inverted roller coaster with seating below the rails.
Free Fly	2009	Inverted roller coaster with track inversions that are made obsolete due to a revolving carriage.
RailRyder	2023	A new single rail roller coaster offering, first presented to prospective clients at the IAAPA Orlando Expo.
Screaming Squirrel	2005 (discontinued)	Variation of the wild mouse roller coaster where there is no defined primary drop, consisting of several "hairpins" and saxophone inversions.
Steeplechase	2017	A family roller coaster with various vehicle theme options; revival of an Arrow coaster of the same name.
Thrust Air 2000	2001 (discontinued)	Extreme launched roller coaster using refrigerated, compressed air.
Wooden Coaster	2003 (discontinued)	Standard wooden roller coaster with several variations in track layout.

=== Towers ===
- Space Shot
- Turbo Drop
- Double Shot
- Combo Tower Ride
- Multi-Tower (two to four Turbo Drop, Space Shot, and/or Combo Tower rides in a single complex)
- Rotating Tower
- Spin Shot
- Sky Sling (no longer available)
- Choose Your Thrill Tower (One tower is small, another is medium-sized, and last tower is the tallest.)
- Sonic Boom (prototype)

=== Flat rides ===
- Sky Swatter (no longer available)
- Screamin' Swing
- Frog Hopper
- Jungle Swing
- Monkey Madness

== List of roller coasters ==
As of 2023, S&S – Sansei Technologies has built 42 roller coasters around the world.

Name	Model	Park	Country	Opened	Status	Ref
Hypersonic XLC	Thrust Air 2000	Kings Dominion	United States	2001	Removed	
Do-Dodonpa; Formerly Dodonpa	Thrust Air 2000	Fuji-Q Highland	Japan	2001	Removed	
Timberhawk: Ride of Prey	Wooden Coaster	Wild Waves Theme & Water Park	United States	2003	Operating	
Falken	Wooden Coaster	Fårup Sommerland	Denmark	2004	Operating	
Avalanche	Wooden Coaster	Timber Falls Adventure Park	United States	2004	Removed	
Hell Cat; Formerly J2; Formerly Tsunami	Wooden Coaster	Clementon Park	United States	2004	Closed	
Powder Keg: A Blast into the Wilderness; Formerly BuzzSaw Falls	Air Launch Coaster	Silver Dollar City	United States	2005	Operating	
Sequoia Magic Loop; Formerly Sequoia Adventure	Screaming Squirrel	Gardaland	Italy	2005	Removed	
Man-O-War; Formerly Screamin Squirrel	Screaming Squirrel	Mysterious Island	China	2006	Operating	
Eejanaika	4th Dimension	Fuji-Q Highland	Japan	2006	Operating	
Afterburner	Screaming Squirrel	Wonder Island	Russia	2007	Removed	
Steel Hawg	El Loco	Indiana Beach	United States	2008	Operating	
Tranan	Free Fly	Skara Sommarland	Sweden	2009	Operating	
Mumbo Jumbo	El Loco	Flamingo Land	United Kingdom	2009	Operating	
Extreme Rusher	Air Launch Coaster	Happy Valley Beijing	China	2011	Closed	
Timber Drop	El Loco	Fraispertuis City	France	2011	Operating	
Green Lantern Coaster	El Loco	Warner Bros. Movie World	Australia	2011	Operating	
Dinoconda	4th Dimension	China Dinosaurs Park	China	2012	Operating	
Bullet Coaster	Air Launch Coaster	Happy Valley Shenzhen	China	2012	Closed	
Eldorado	Family Coaster	Etnaland	Italy	2013	Operating	
Ring Racer	Air Launch Coaster	Nürburgring	Germany	2013	Removed	
Crazy Bird	El Loco	Happy Valley Tianjin	China	2013	Operating	
El Loco	El Loco	Adventuredome	United States	2014	Operating	
OCT Thrust SSC1000	Air Launch Coaster	Happy Valley Wuhan	China	2014	Closed	
Batman: The Ride	4D Free Spin	Six Flags Fiesta Texas	United States	2015	Operating	
The Joker	4D Free Spin	Six Flags Great Adventure	United States	2016	Operating	
The Joker	4D Free Spin	Six Flags Great America	United States	2017	Operating	
The Joker	4D Free Spin	Six Flags New England	United States	2017	Operating	
The Joker	4D Free Spin	Six Flags Over Texas	United States	2017	Operating	
Arashi	4D Free Spin	Nagashima Spa Land	Japan	2017	Operating	
GaleForce	Launch Coaster	Playland's Castaway Cove	United States	2017	Operating	
Merlin's Mayhem	Family Inverted Coaster	Dutch Wonderland	United States	2018	Operating	
Wonder Woman Coaster	4D Free Spin	Six Flags Mexico	Mexico	2018	Operating	
Steel Curtain	Looping Coaster	Kennywood	United States	2019	Operating	
Maxx Force	Air Launch Coaster	Six Flags Great America	United States	2019	Operating	
Batman: The Ride	4D Free Spin	Six Flags Discovery Kingdom	United States	2019	Operating	
Shooting Roller Coaster	Air Launch Coaster	Sun Tzu Cultural Park	China	2020	Closed	
Dragon Slayer	4D Free Spin	Adventureland (Iowa)	United States	2021	Operating	
John Wick: Open Contract	4D Free Spin	Motiongate Dubai	United Arab Emirates	2022	Operating	
Tumbili	4D Free Spin	Kings Dominion	United States	2022	Operating	
Unknown	Air Launch Coaster	Colorful World	China	2023	Closed	
Unknown	4D Free Spin	Ocean Flower Island Fairyland	China	2023	Closed	
Transformers	Axis Coaster	SEVEN Al Madha	Saudi Arabia	TBD	Under construction	
Transformers	Axis Coaster	SEVEN Jeddah	Saudi Arabia	TBD	Under construction	
Transformers	Axis Coaster	SEVEN Damman	Saudi Arabia	TBD	Under construction	

== List of other attractions ==
Name	Model	Park	Country	Opened	Status	Ref
Space Shot	Space Shot Prototype (8 seats)	Reino Aventura	(Mexico) México	1995	Removed	
Moon Shot	Space Shot	U.S. Space & Rocket Center	United States	1996	Operating	
Big Shot	Space Shot	Stratosphere Las Vegas	United States	1996	Operating	
Detonator	Multi-Tower (2 towers, Space Shot)	Worlds of Fun	United States	1996	Operating	
Uppskjutet	Space Shot	Liseberg	Sweden	1996	Removed	
Columbia & Discovery	Multi-Tower (2 towers, Space Shot and Turbo Drop)	Mirabilandia	Italy	1997	Operating	
Launch Pad	Space Shot	Blackpool Pleasure Beach	United Kingdom	1997	Operating	
SpaceShot (formerly known as Japp'en or Japp SpaceShot)	Space Shot	TusenFryd	Norway	1998	Operating	
Space Shot	Multi-Tower (3 towers, Space Shot)	Nagashima Spa Land	Japan	1997	Operating	
Uppskjutet	Space Shot	Liseberg	Sweden	1996	Removed	
Double Shot	Double Shot	Indiana Beach	United States	1999	Operating	
Power Tower	Multi-Tower (4 towers, Space Shot and Turbo Drop)	Cedar Point	United States	1998	Operating	
Scream!	Multi-Tower (3 towers, Space Shot and Turbo Drop)	Six Flags New England	United States	1998	Operating	
Sky Jet	Multi-Tower (2 towers, Space Shot and Turbo Drop)	Janfusun Fancyworld	Taiwan	1998	Operating	
Space Shot	Space Shot	Happy Valley Shenzhen	China	1998	Operating	
Space Shot	Space Shot	Walibi Holland	Netherlands	1998	Operating	
Supreme Scream	Multi-Tower (3 towers, Turbo Drop)	Knott's Berry Farm	United States	1998	Operating	
The Volcano	Space Shot	Fantasy Island	United Kingdom	1998	Operating	
Totem; Formerly Totem Infernal and SkunX Tower	Space Shot	Walibi Rhône-Alpes	France	1998	Operating	
Det Gyldne Tårn	Turbo Drop	Tivoli Gardens	Denmark	1999	Operating	
Doctor Doom's Fearfall	Multi-Tower (2 towers, Space Shot)	Islands of Adventure	United States	1999	Operating	
Dominator	Multi-Tower (2 towers, Space Shot and Turbo Drop)	Dorney Park	United States	1999	Operating	
Orbite; Formerly Space Shot	Space Shot	La Ronde; Action Park	Canada	1999; 1996 to 1998	Operating	
Raketti	Space Shot	Linnanmäki	Finland	1999	Operating	
Scream!	Multi-Tower (3 towers, Combo)	Six Flags Fiesta Texas	United States	1999	Operating	
Space Shot	Space Shot	Adventureland	United States	1999	Operating	
The Rocket	Multi-Tower (3 towers, Space Shot and Turbo Drop)	Lagoon	United States	1999	Operating	
Hellevator	Combo Tower Ride	Playland	Canada	2000	Operating	
Höjdskräcken	Turbo Drop	Liseberg	Sweden	2000	Removed	
Kilauea	Multi-Tower (3 towers, Combo)	Six Flags México	(Mexico) México	2000	Operating	
Power Tower	Multi-Tower (3 towers, Space Shot and Turbo Drop)	Valleyfair	United States	2000	Operating	
Maliboomer	Multi-Tower (3 towers, Space Shot)	Disney California Adventure Park	United States	2001	Removed	
Space Shot	Space Shot	Genting Theme Park	Malaysia	2001	Removed	
The Abyss	Turbo Drop	Ocean Park Hong Kong	Hong Kong	2001	Removed	
VertiGo	Sky Sling	Cedar Point	United States	2001	Removed	
VertiGo	Sky Sling	Knott's Berry Farm	United States	2001	Removed	
Cliff Hanger	Combo Tower Ride	Flamingo Land Resort	United Kingdom	2002	Operating	
La Venganza del Enigma	Multi-Tower (3 towers, Space Shot, Turbo Drop, and Combo)	Parque Warner Madrid	Spain	2002	Operating	
Space Blast	Space Shot Prototype (8 seats)	Magical Midway; D&D Amusements	United States	2002; 1995	SBNO	
Starblaster	Double Shot	Canobie Lake Park	United States	2002	Operating	
Superman: Tower of Power	Multi Tower (3 towers, Combo)	Six Flags Over Texas	United States	2003	Operating	
Liberty Launch; Cobra	Double Shot	Holiday World; Cobra Adventure Park	United States	2003; 2001 to 2002	Operating	
Down Time; Formerly StratosFear Screamer - Re-Entry	Turbo Drop	Lake Compounce; Alabama Adventure	United States	2004; 2001 to 2003	Operating	
Sky Screamer	Multi-Tower (3 towers, Combo)	Marineland	Canada	2004	SBNO	
Screamin' Swing	Screamin' Swing	Knott's Berry Farm	United States	2004	Removed	
Double Shot	Double Shot	Santa Cruz Beach Boardwalk	United States	2005	Operating	
Screamin' Swing	Screamin' Swing	Dorney Park & Wildwater Kingdom	United States	2005	Removed	
Screamin' Swing	Screamin' Swing	Family Fun Center	United States	2005	Operating	
Screamin' Swing	Screamin' Swing	Morey's Piers	United States	2005	Operating	
Rush	Screamin' Swing	Thorpe Park	United Kingdom	2005	Operating	
Slammer	Sky Swatter	Thorpe Park	United Kingdom	2005	Removed	
Catapult; Formerly SWAT	Sky Swatter	Six Flags New England; Six Flags AstroWorld	United States	2006; 2003 to 2005	Removed	
Batwing Spaceshot	Space Shot	Warner Bros. Movie World	Australia	2006	Operating	
Skyhawk	Screamin' Swing	Cedar Point	United States	2006	Operating	
Thunder and Lightning	Screamin' Swing	Lake Compounce	United States	2006	Operating	
Xtreme Swing	Screamin' Swing	Valleyfair	United States	2006	Operating	
Apollo's Swing	Screamin' Swing	Mt. Olympus Water & Theme Park	United States	2007	Operating	
Giant Barn Swing	Screamin' Swing	Silver Dollar City	United States	2007	Operating	
Screamin' Swing	Screamin' Swing	Fun Spot Atlanta	United States	2007	Operating	
Uppswinget	Screamin' Swing	Liseberg	Sweden	2007	Operating	
Sasquatch; Formerly Bayou Blaster and Sonic Slam	Multi-Tower (2 towers, Space Shot and Turbo Drop)	Great Escape; Six Flags New Orleans	United States	2009; 2000 to 2005	Operating	
Black Mamba	Space Shot	Luna Park, Tel Aviv	Israel	2009	Operating	
Giant Canyon Swing	Screamin' Swing	Glenwood Caverns Adventure Park	United States	2010	Operating	
Barnstormer	Screamin' Swing	Dollywood	United States	2011	Operating	
Hot Seat; Formerly Gauntlet	Screamin' Swing	Fun Spot Kissimmee; Wild Adventures	United States	≤ 2011; 2005 to 2007	Operating	
Swedish Swing	Screamin' Swing	Scandia Amusement Park	United States	2012	Removed	
Blast Off; Formerly StratosFear Screamer - Launch	Space Shot	Six Flags Darien Lake; Alabama Adventure	United States	2013; 2001 to 2011	Operating	
Oozora Tengoku	Screamin' Swing	Lake Sagami Pleasure Forest	Japan	2014	Operating	
Hot Seat; Formerly Gauntlet	Screamin' Swing	Fun Spot Orlando; Wild Adventures	United States	2015; 2005 to 2007	Operating	
Hershey Triple Tower	Choose Your Thrill Tower (Double Shot and Combo)	Hersheypark	United States	2017	Operating	
Finnegan's Flyer	Screamin' Swing	Busch Gardens Williamsburg	United States	2019	Operating	
Drop Tower; Formerly Hyper Blaster	Double Shot	Navy Pier; Pleasure Island	United States	2021; 2000 to 2016	Operating	
Space Mission Orbit; Formerly Hot Shot; Formerly O2 Tower	Combo Tower Ride	Movieland Park; Blue Bayou and Dixie Landin'; Miracle Strip Amusement Park	Italy	2021; 2006 to 2019; 2002 to 2004	Operating	
Harpoon	Combo Tower Ride	Hainan Ocean Paradise	China	2021	Operating	
Terraform Tower Challenge	Combo Tower Ride	Genting SkyWorlds	Malaysia	2022	Operating	
Tidal Surge	Screamin' Swing	SeaWorld San Antonio	United States	2022	Operating	
Skyborne; Formerly Turbo Drop	Turbo Drop	Lost Island Theme Park; Buffalo Bill's	United States	2022; 1997 to 2017	Operating	
Serengeti Flyer	Screamin' Swing	Busch Gardens Tampa Bay	United States	2023	Operating	
Twizzlers Twisted Gravity	Screamin' Swing	Hersheypark	United States	2025	Operating	
Sirocco Tower	Strata Tower	Six Flags Qiddiya City	Saudi Arabia	2025	Operating	
Nutcracker	Screamin’ Swing	Lagoon	United States	2026	Operating	
Unknown	Screamin' Swing	COTALAND	United States	2026	Under construction	
Unknown	Combo Tower Ride	Sunac Cultural Tourism City	China	TBD	Under construction	
Unknown	Combo Tower Ride	World Fairytale Land	China	TBD	Under construction	
Unknown	Space Shot	Chongqing Wanda Theme Park	China	TBD	Under construction	

== Gallery ==
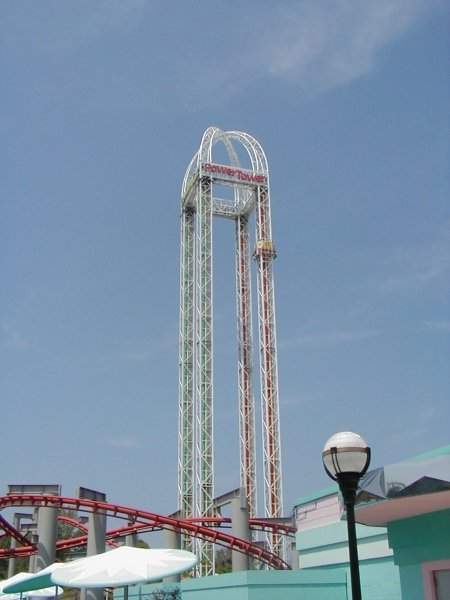
Power Tower at Cedar Point

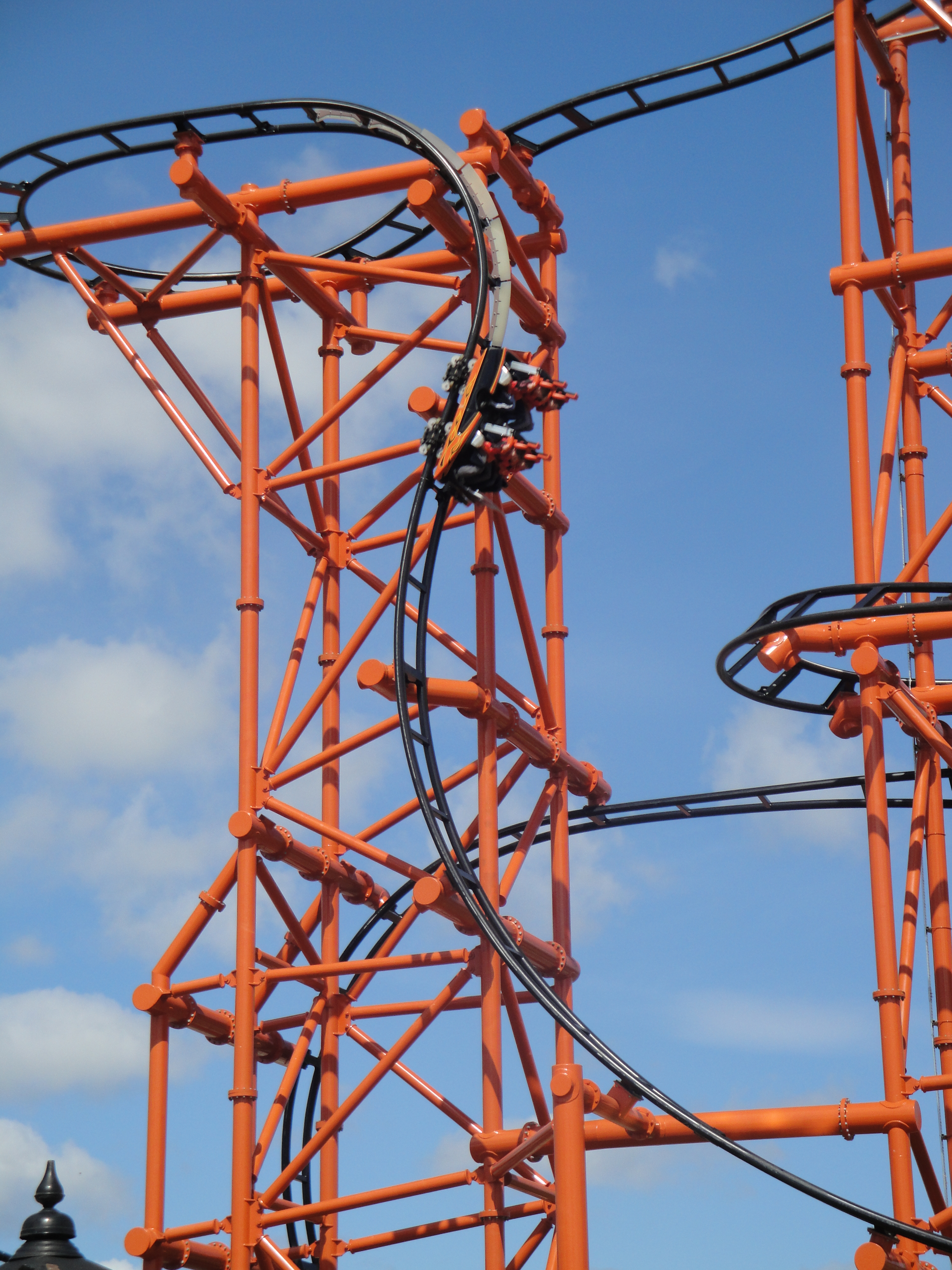
Mumbo Jumbo at Flamingo Land

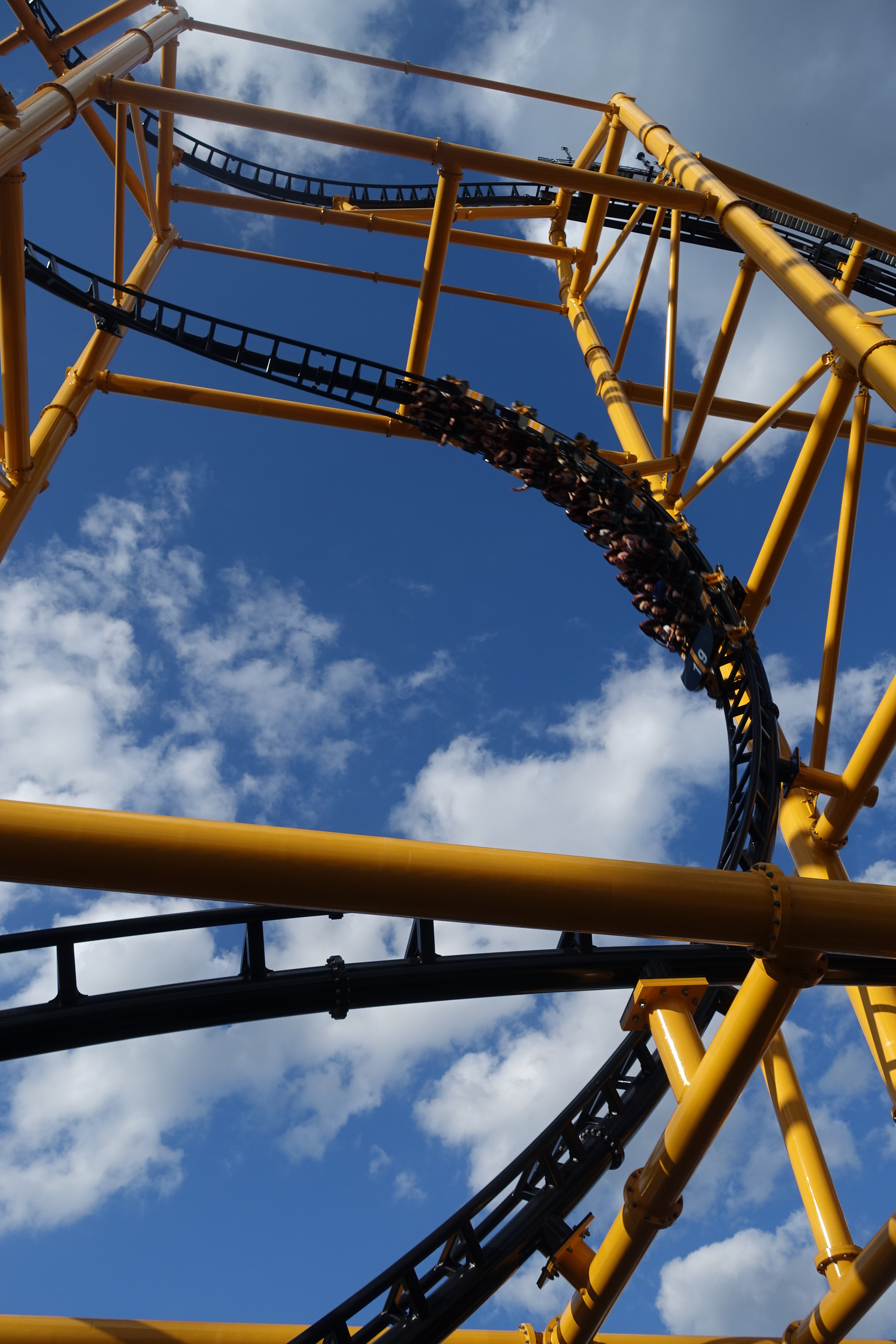
Steel Curtain at Kennywood

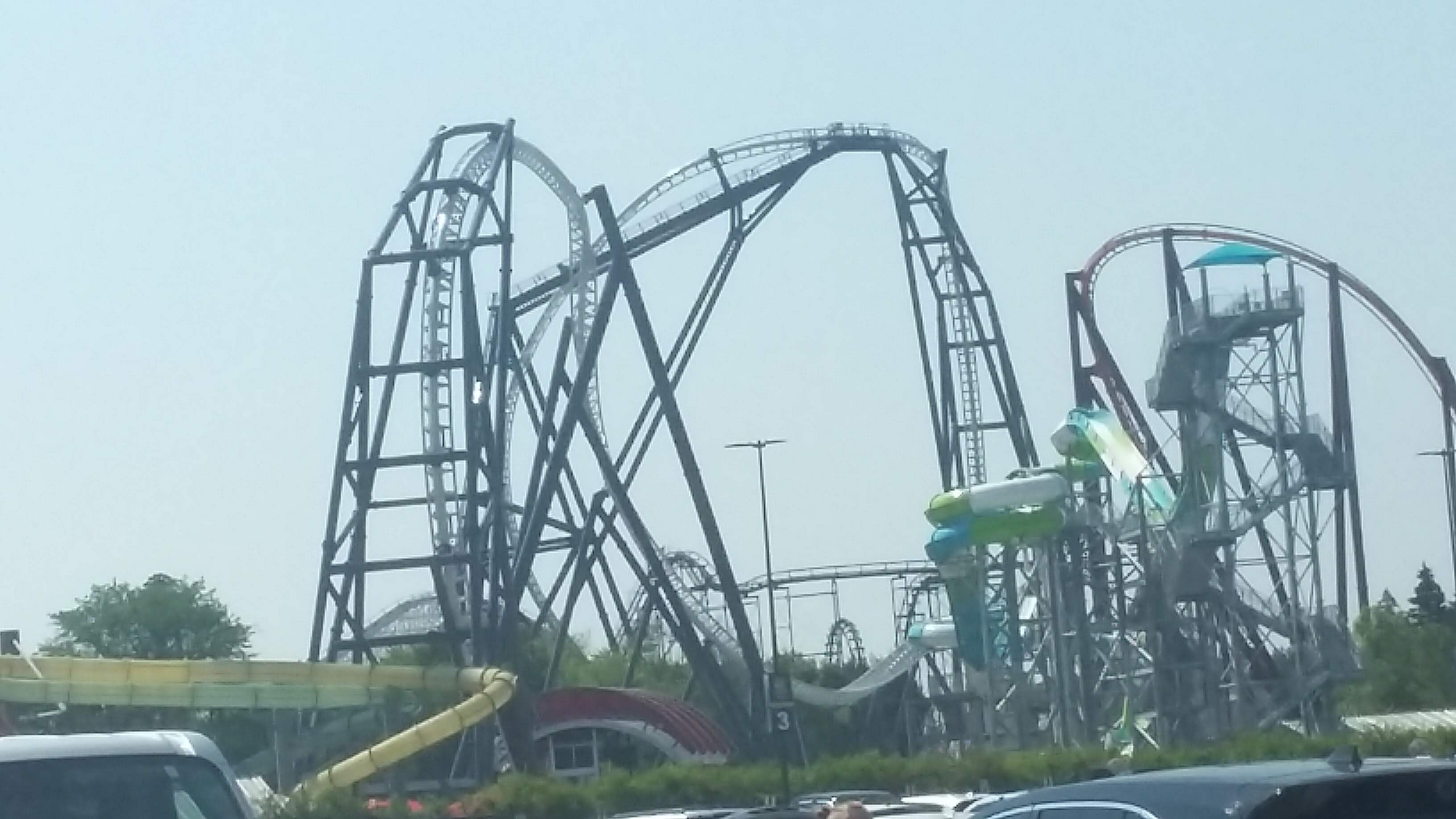
Maxx Force at Six Flags Great America

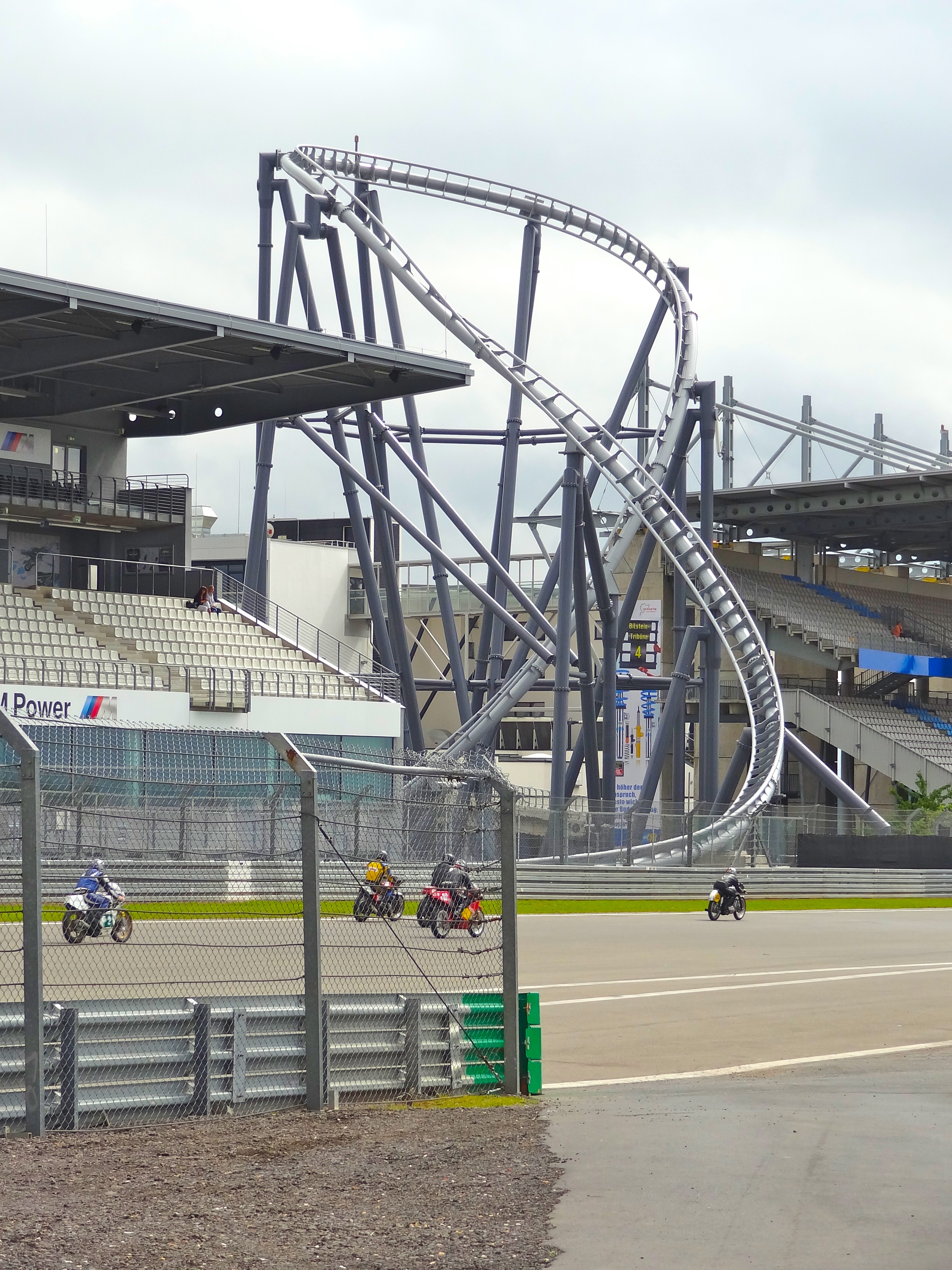
Ring Racer at Nürburgring

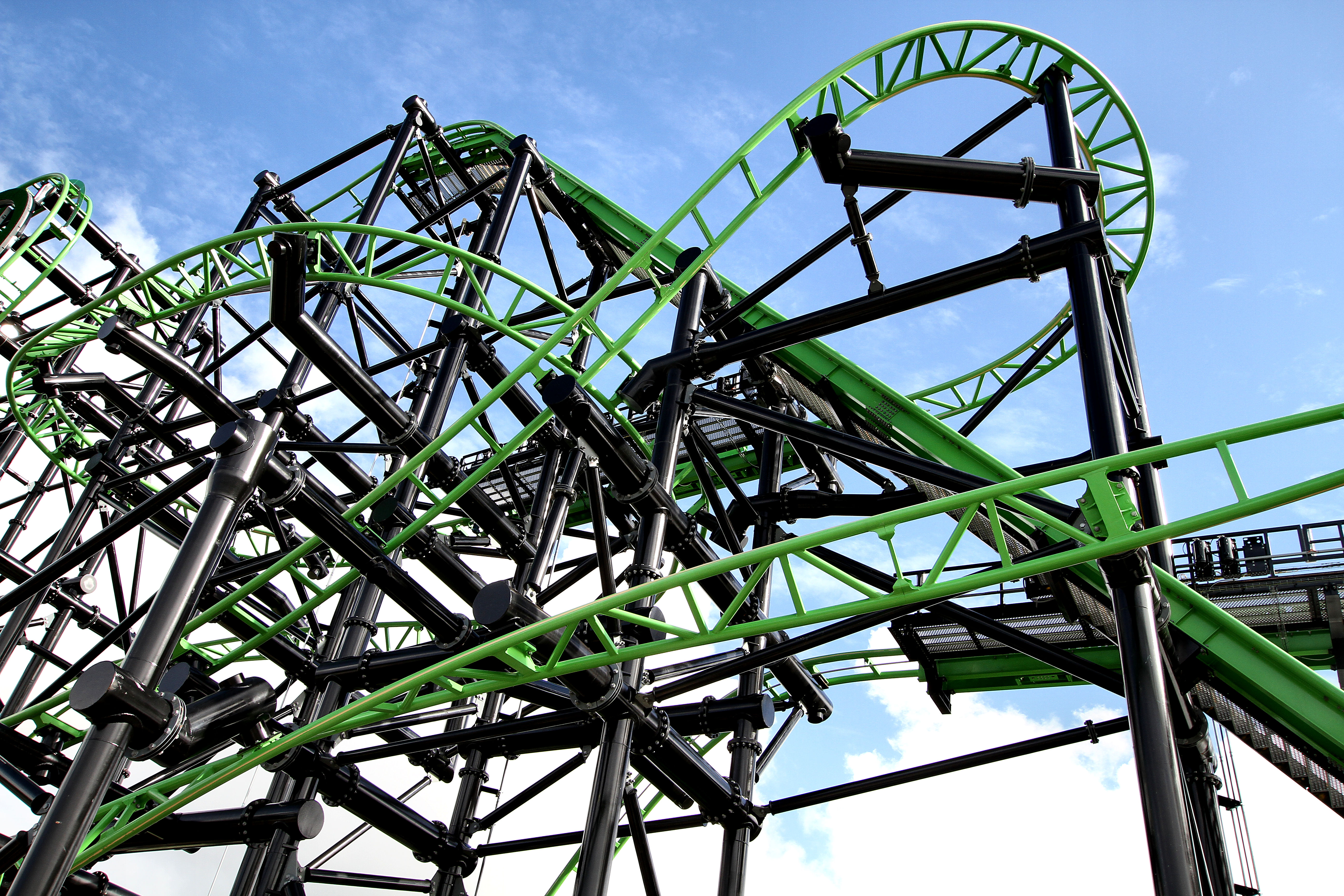
Green Lantern Coaster at Warner Bros Movie World

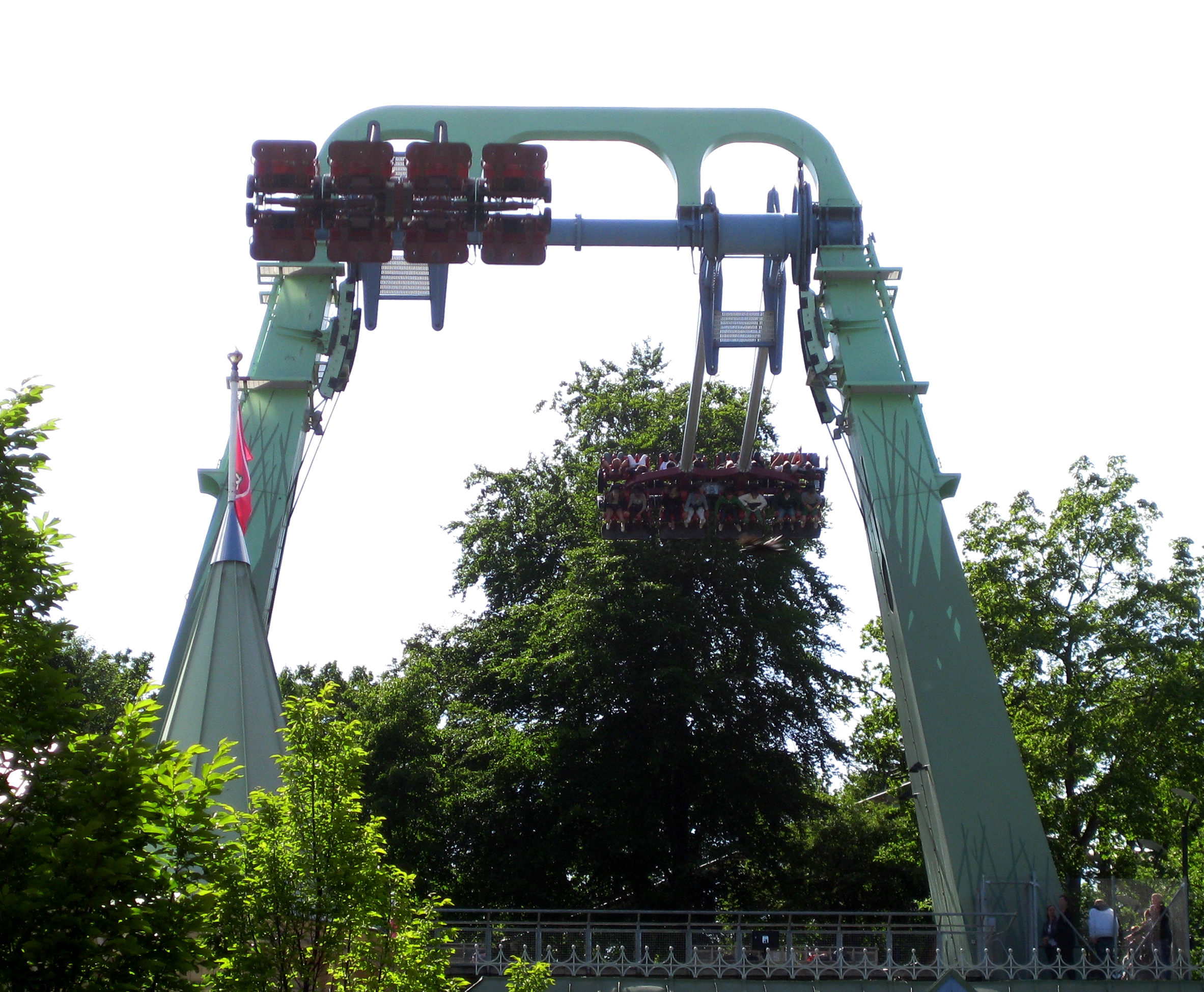
Uppswinget at Liseberg

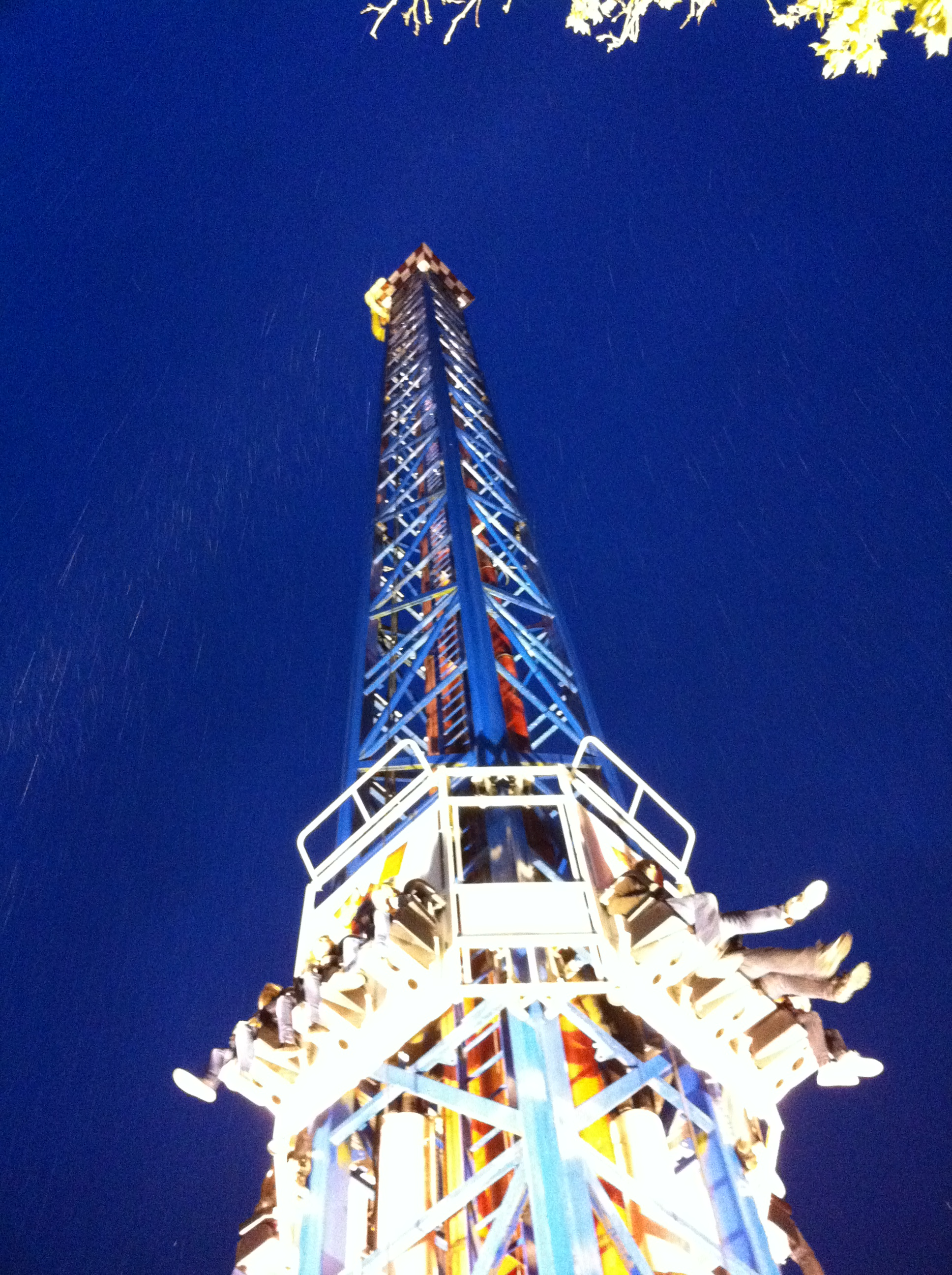
Space Shot at Walibi Holland
