= XLC =

XLC or xlc may refer to:

- Hypersonic XLC, a defunct roller coaster located at Kings Dominion in Doswell, Virginia
- xlc, the ISO 639-3 code for the Lycian language, an extinct language from the Anatolian peninsula
