= Merlin's Mayhem =

Suspended family roller coaster at Dutch Wonderland

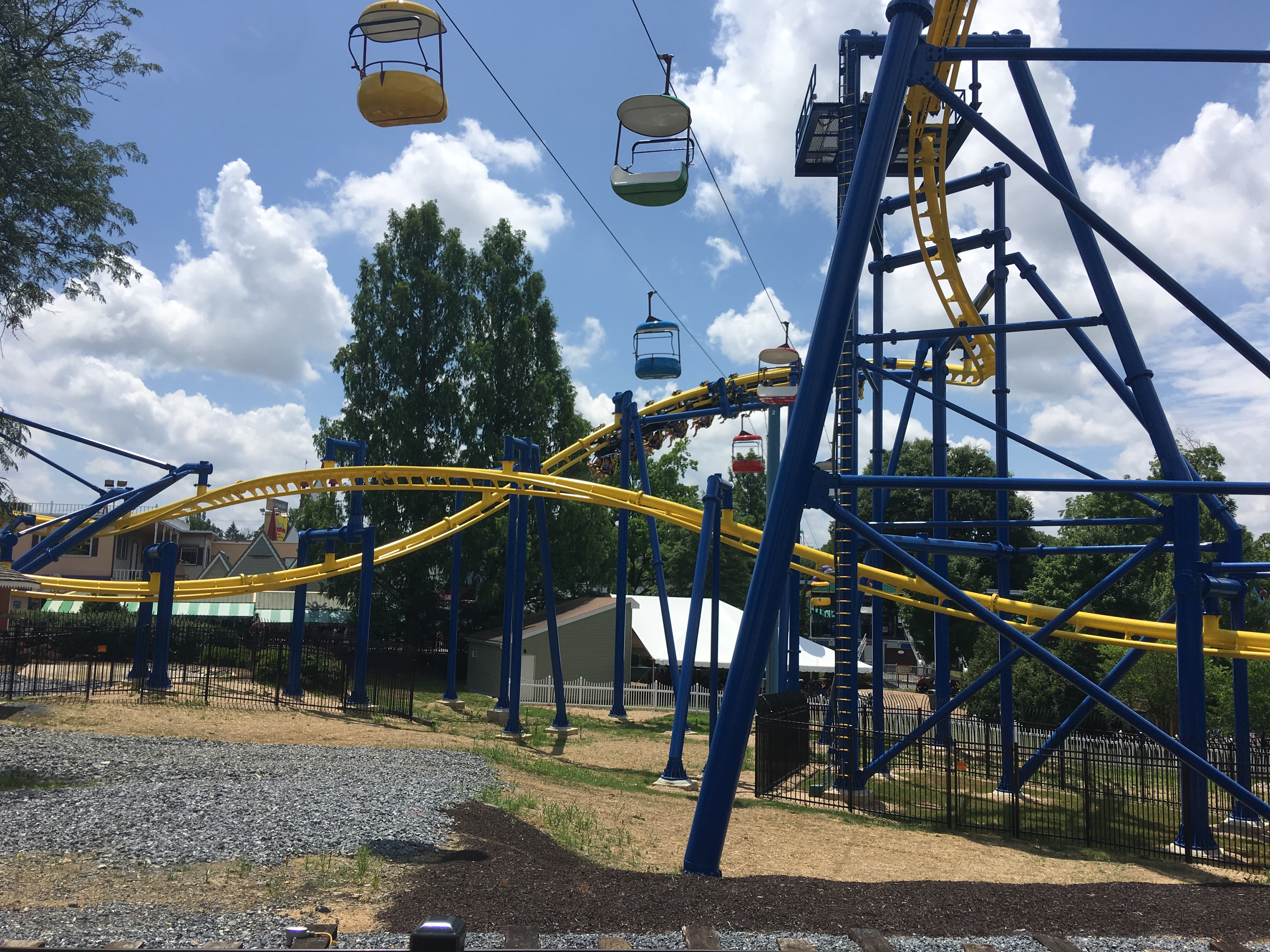

Dutch Wonderland
- Location: Dutch Wonderland
- Coordinates: 40.028651°N 76.218628°W
- Status: Operating
- Opening date: April 28, 2018
- Cost: $7,500,000
- Replaced: Turnpike

General statistics
- Type: Steel – Family – Inverted
- Manufacturer: S&S – Sansei Technologies
- Designer: Joe Draves
- Model: Family Inverted Coaster
- Track layout: Twister
- Lift/launch system: Chain lift hill
- Height: 60 ft (18 m)
- Length: 1,300 ft (400 m)
- Inversions: 0
- Duration: 1:00
- Height restriction: 39 in (99 cm)
- Trains: Single train with 10 cars; riders arranged 2 across in a single row for a total of 20 riders per train
- Website: Official website
- Merlin's Mayhem at RCDB

Merlin's Mayhem is an S&S Sansei family inverted roller coaster at Dutch Wonderland in East Lampeter Township, just east of Lancaster, Pennsylvania. The coaster opened on land formerly occupied by the original Turnpike attraction. It was originally slated to open for the 2017 season, but numerous construction setbacks and a longer than anticipated approval process resulted in the ride's opening getting pushed back a year, to 2018.

== History ==
For the 2014 season, Dutch Wonderland opened the new prehistoric-themed Exploration Island park area, which cost in excess of $1 million to construct and saw the addition of 15 animatronic dinosaurs and various activities associated with them. Alongside this development, the park's classic Turnpike attraction, which was built in 1963 by Arrow Dynamics, was reconstructed along the perimeter of the Exploration Island. This was said to be doubled in length, rendering the original obsolete and leaving space in the centre of the park for future development.

On October 24, 2016, the park began to release teasers that were soon connected to the addition of a new ride. On November 1, 2016, Merlin's Mayhem was officially announced, in the form of a high-flying family inverted coaster that would take guests on a quest to find Merlin's mischievous pet dragon Mayhem. Built on the old Turnpike site, it would become the park's first coaster in nearly two decades as well as the largest and tallest ride in the park. Two weeks later, on November 16, 2016, the Merlin's Mayhem ride vehicle was revealed by the ride manufacturer, Utah-based S&S – Sansei Technologies, at the IAAPA 2016 Expo in Orlando, Florida.

Track pieces would begin to arrive in April 2017, and the ride would go vertical soon after. Despite a fast construction pace, Merlin's Mayhem missed its projected summer opening, and on December 20, 2017, the park announced that the attraction's grand opening had been delayed to 2018. This was attributed to various construction setbacks and a longer-than-anticipated approval process, reportedly due to the coaster's interactions with the park's Sky Ride and other attractions. Following the delays, Merlin's Mayhem was officially opened to the public on April 28, 2018.

== Characteristics ==
=== Ride experience ===
Leaving the station, the train immediately enters the 60-foot (18 m) tall lift hill. At the peak of the lift, the ride descends into a pre-drop gradual left hand turn over the Sky Ride before hitting the main drop. Riders immediately navigate a turnaround over a pond and speed through a gradual S-bend, before hitting the ride's helix. The train dives into a tunnel under the Wonderland Special Narrow-gauge railway, hits a final right-hand turnaround, and enters the brake run into the station.

=== Statistics ===
Merlin's Mayhem is 1,300 feet (400 m) long and stands 60 feet (18 m) tall. It is the first Inverted roller coaster to be manufactured by S&S – Sansei Technologies from Logan, Utah. It was designed by former GCI engineer Joe Draves, who had also worked on projects such as Steel Curtain at Kennywood and Lightning Run at Kentucky Kingdom. The coaster utilizes a single open-air 20 passenger train with lap bars, onboard audio, and a Chain lift hill. Merlin's Mayhem also interacts with the park's Sky Ride and Wonderland Special railroad.
