= Sky Swatter =

Defunct flat ride

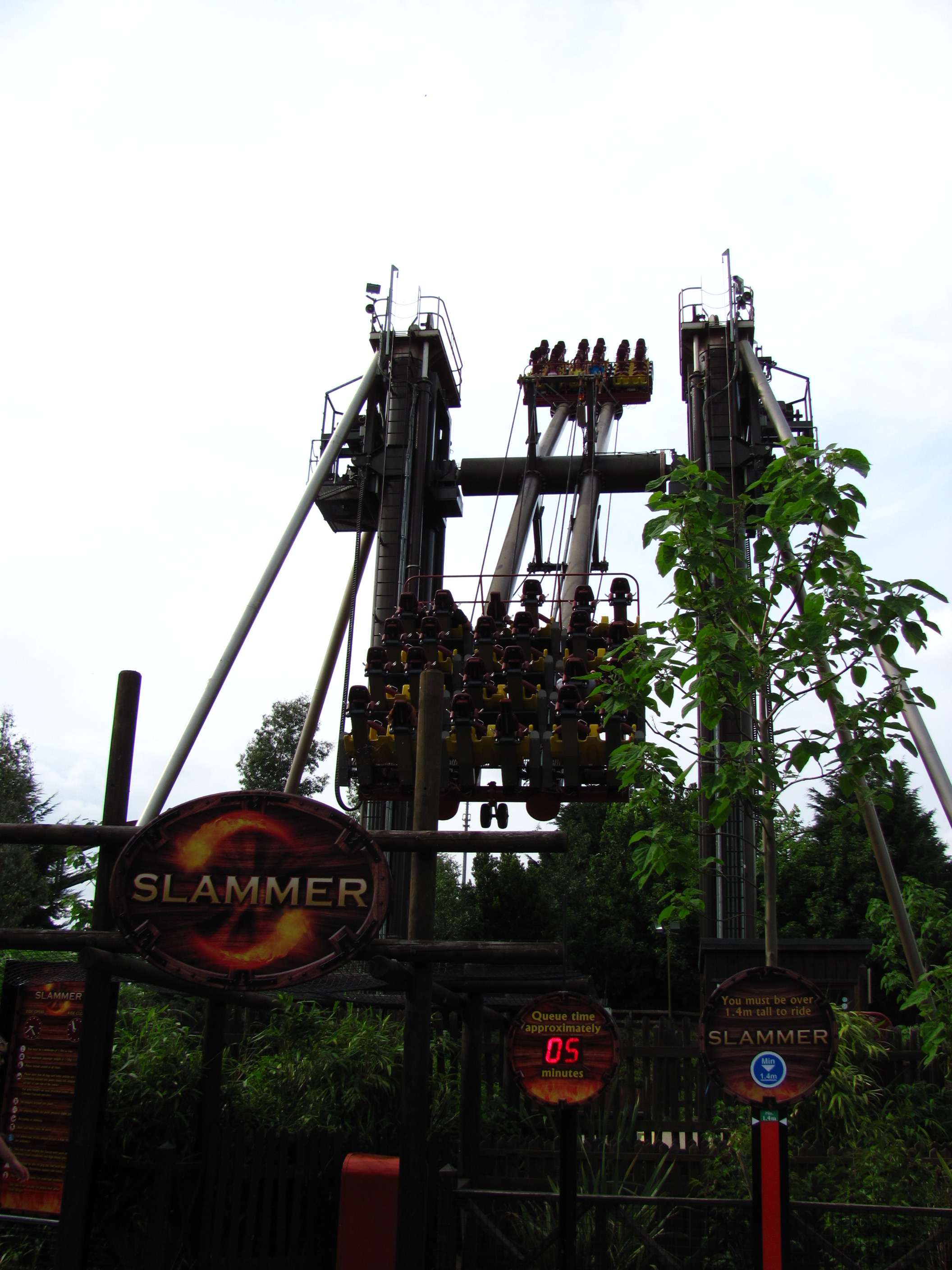
- Slammer at Thorpe Park
- Status: Discontinued
- First manufactured: 2003
- No. of installations: 2
- Manufacturer: S&S Power
- Height: 105 ft (32 m)
- Speed: 30 mph (48 km/h)
- G force: 4
- Capacity: 500 riders per hour
- Vehicles: 2
- Riders per vehicle: 24
- Rows: 8
- Riders per row: 6
- Duration: 2-3 mins

The Sky Swatter (sometimes Sky Swat) was a thrill ride which was built by S&S Power of Logan, Utah. It was marketed from 2003 to 2010; only two Sky Swatters were manufactured. The first installation of a Sky Swatter was as SWAT at Six Flags AstroWorld in Houston, Texas, which operated from 2003 until the park permanently closed at the end of the 2005 season. The ride then was moved to Six Flags New England and operated from 2006 through 2012 as Catapult. The other Sky Swatter operated as Slammer at Thorpe Park from 2005 until the ride closed permanently in May 2017.

== History ==
S&S Worldwide (then S&S Power) introduced the Sky Swatter at its Logan factory on October 3, 2002, as the company's first true flat ride. The ride made its debut at Six Flags AstroWorld as SWAT for the 2003 season. On 28 March 2005, Thorpe Park, near London, England, introduced a Sky Swatter as Slammer, which was the second and final Sky Swatter to be manufactured.

At the end of its operating season, Six Flags AstroWorld closed permanently on October 30, 2005. Several AstroWorld rides were relocated to other Six Flags parks between 2006 and 2010. Six Flags New England received two, both of which began operation for the 2006 season: SWAT (renamed to Catapult) and Diablo Falls (a spinning river rapids ride, renamed to Splash Water Falls).

In 2010, Larsen MacColl acquired a majority share of the company from Stan Checketts, and S&S Worldwide discontinued the Sky Swatter. Following the loss of support, Catapult at Six Flags New England was removed in March 2013, prior to its 2013 operating season, leaving Slammer at Thorpe Park as the only operating Sky Swatter. On May 4, 2017, Thorpe Park announced the immediate closure of Slammer after its prolonged period of downtime.

== Design and ride experience ==
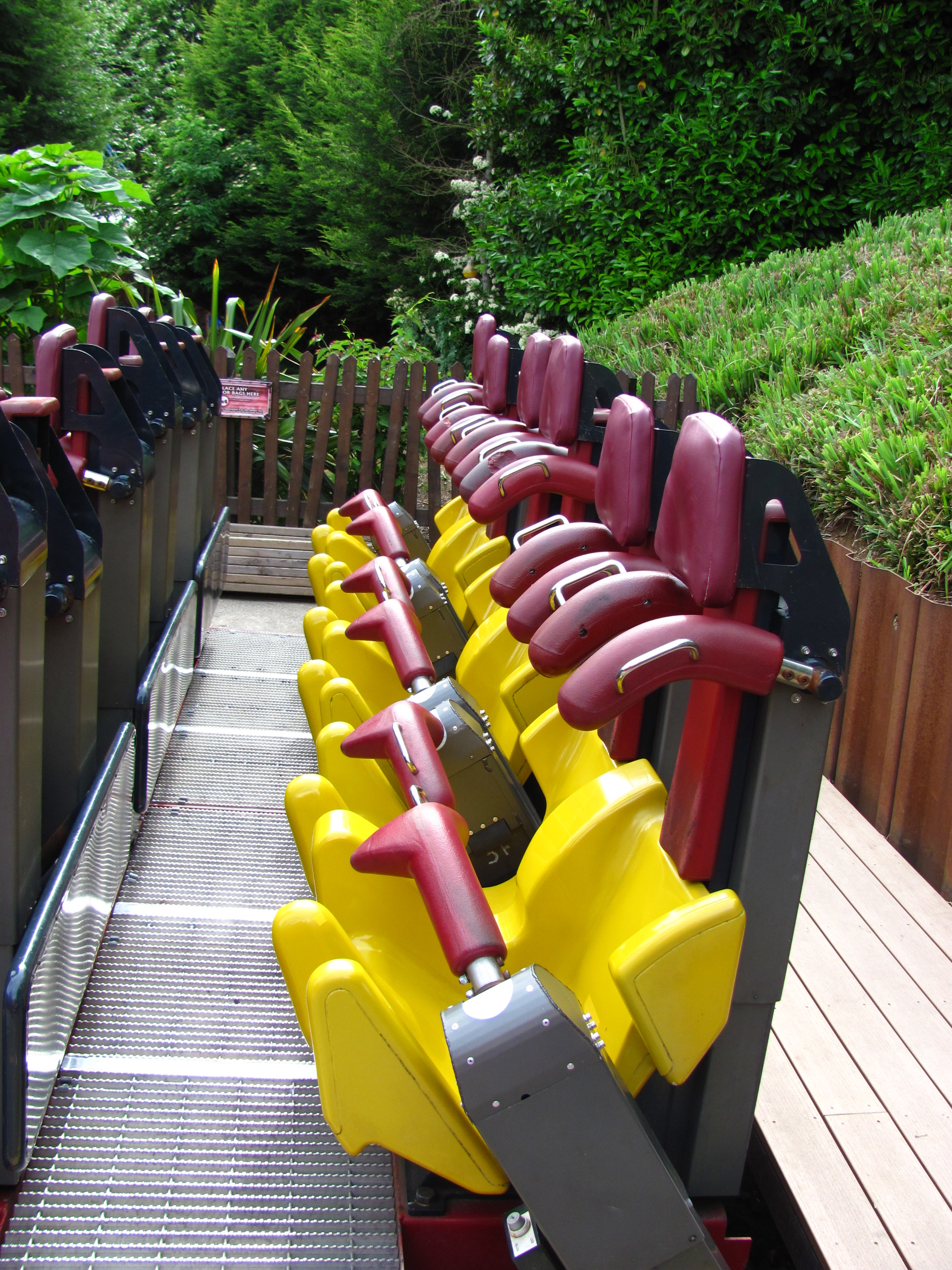
One row of seats on Slammer, showing restraints and grid flooring (2010)

The concept for the Sky Swatter was developed by S&S CEO Stan Checketts in 1993. The design of the ride's restraints took approximately one year to complete, while the structural and mechanical components were developed over a five-month period. The ride featured a long arm suspended between two towers, with each end of the arm accommodating four rows of six seats, resulting in an estimated throughput of 800 to 900 riders per hour. The restraint system combined side-lowering lap bars with partial over-the-shoulder restraints, a configuration also used on other S&S attractions, including Screamin' Swing and Sky Sling. The ride's floor was ventilated, allowing air and small objects to pass through.

During operation, the arm was raised to the top of the towers and then set into motion. As it rotated between the towers, riders moved in an orbital motion, either upward or downward around the arm's center. After completing several rotations in one direction, the ride reversed, flipping riders in the opposite direction. Riders could reach speeds exceeding 30 mph (48 km/h).

== Installations ==
Name	Park	Location	Opened	Status
Slammer	Thorpe Park	United Kingdom	2005	Removed
Catapult; Formerly SWAT	Six Flags New England; Six Flags AstroWorld	United States	2006; 2003 to 2005	Removed

=== Slammer ===
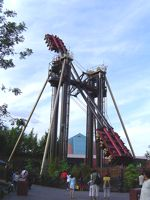
Slammer (Thorpe Park)

Slammer was the second and final S&S Power Sky Swatter to be built, and the only in Europe. It debuted on 28 March 2005 at Thorpe Park.

Slammer was plagued with reliability issues starting from its opening in 2005; the ride would get stuck with the arm locked at the top of the tower. The opening of the ride was delayed from the start of season by two days, and shut for more than two weeks following a fault on its second day of operation. On March 18, 2006, the levelling mechanism failed, leaving riders trapped at a 45-degree angle. In 2010, Slammer closed before the end of the season and experienced faults preventing the full lift of the arm at the start of 2011.

Between 2012 and 2014, Slammer suffered prolonged downtime. For 2012, Slammer did not open until October. All signage for the ride was removed at the end of 2012, suggesting that Thorpe Park had no immediate plans to reopen it. By the 2013 Fright Nights event, the ride had also been omitted from the park map. However, at the start of the 2014 season, the ride could be seen testing again.

Slammer reopened for the 2015 season in May and operated for the majority of the season. The ride was closed daily at 3:00 p.m. for a 15-minute inspection and remained closed for portions of that year’s Fright Nights Halloween event. It then had a successful 2016 season.

It April 2017, after a brief period of operation, Thorpe Park announced Slammer would remain closed for the rest the season. On May 4, after 12 years service at the resort, Thorpe Park stated Slammer had closed permanently and would be removed to make way for future attractions. However, the ride remained in place, nonoperational, for several years.

From 2021 to 2023, the Black Mirror Labyrinth attraction utilised Slammer's disused queue line.

As of February 2025, the removal of Slammer had begun, with large sections of the ride’s structure being cut on site and lifted away using a crane. The dismantling was completed prior to the start of the 2025 season in late March.

=== Catapult (SWAT) ===
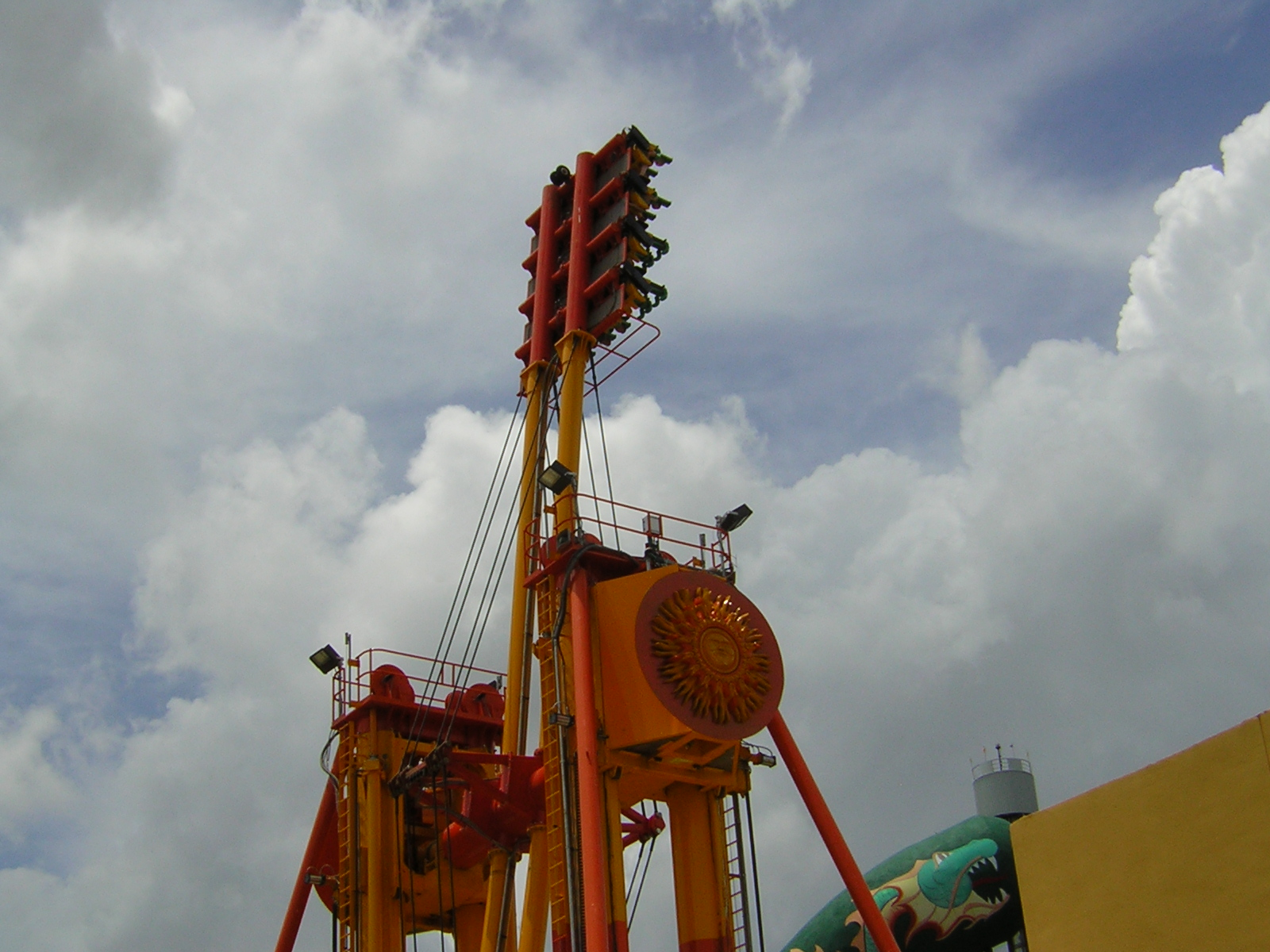
SWAT at Six Flags AstroWorld (2004)

SWAT was one of two new rides added to Six Flags AstroWorld for the 2003 season; a press release from February touted the unique installation.

SWAT was moved to Six Flags New England from AstroWorld after that park closed on October 30, 2005; at New England, the ride was renamed Catapult, and opened for the 2006 season. It operated sporadically through 2006 and 2007 due to maintenance issues, and the park announced it would not return for the 2008 season; however, the restraint system was rehabilitated and it operated with greater reliability from 2008 until it was removed in March 2013, prior to the 2013 season.
