= Dutch Wonderland =

Amusement park in Pennsylvania

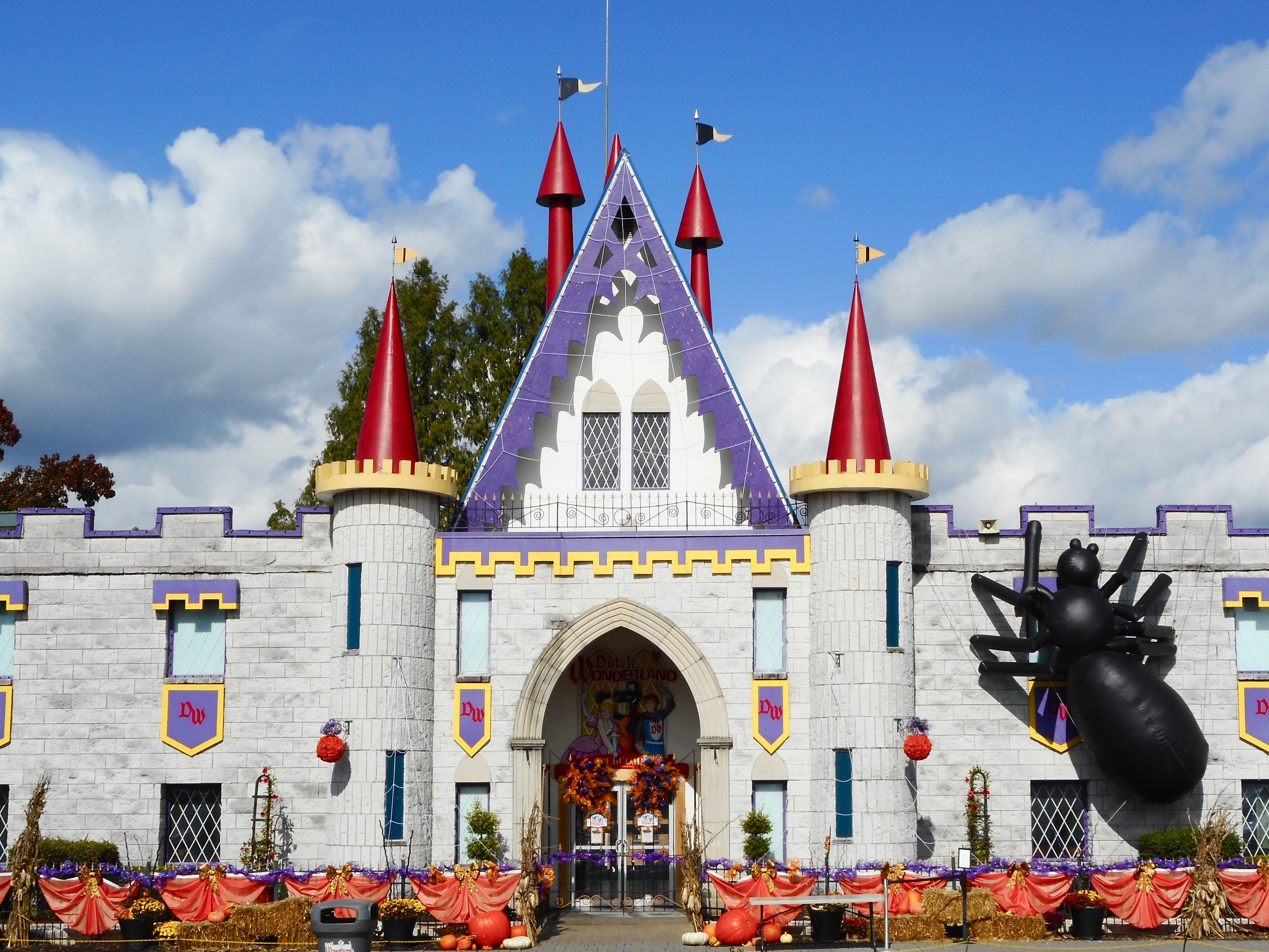
- Dutch Wonderland entrance decorated for Halloween in 2018.
- Interactive map of Dutch Wonderland
- Location: East Lampeter Township, Pennsylvania, U.S.
- Coordinates: 40.0277°N 76.2184°W
- Opened: May 20, 1963; 63 years ago
- Owner: Herschend
- Slogan: "A Kingdom for Kids"
- Area: 48 acres (19 ha)

Attractions
- Total: 34
- Roller coasters: 3
- Water rides: 1 (Plus 2 Boat Based Rides)
- Website: www.dutchwonderland.com

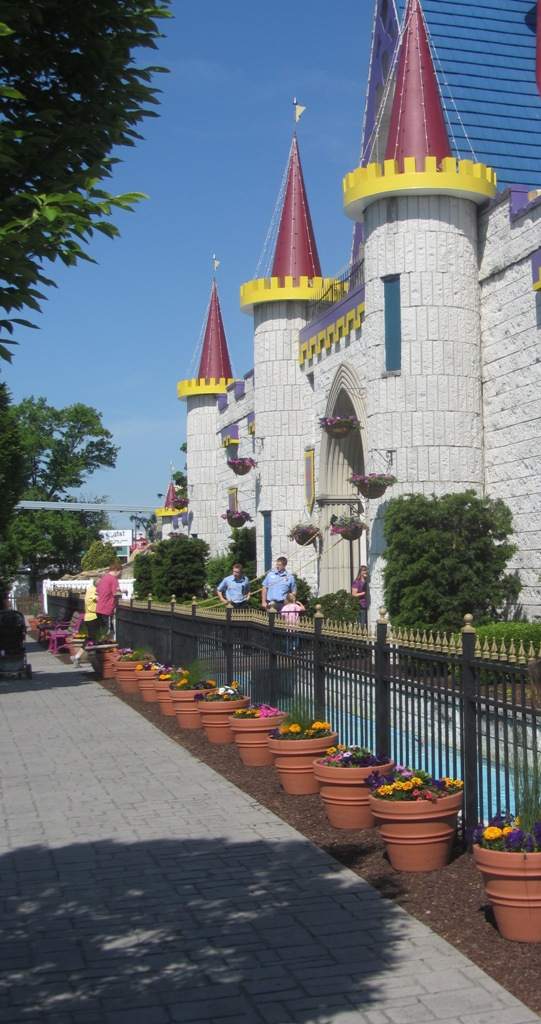
Dutch Wonderland Entrance at normal state in 2012.

Dutch Wonderland is a 48-acre (19 ha) theme park just east of Lancaster, Pennsylvania in East Lampeter Township, appealing primarily to families with small children.

The park's theme is a "Kingdom for Kids". Its entrance has a stone imitation castle façade, which was built by Earl Clark, a potato farmer, before he opened the park in 1963.

== Overview ==
The park has 30 rides, plus a tropical-themed interactive water play area called Duke's Lagoon, and live entertainment. It also has an extended season, open for "Eggcellent Celebration," "Happy Hauntings," and "Dutch Winter Wonderland" events for Easter, Halloween, and Christmas. The park is part of a larger area in Lancaster zoned for entertainment, dining, lodging, and conferences.

The Clark family sold Dutch Wonderland in 2001 to Hershey Entertainment and Resorts Company. They also operate Old Mill Stream Campground and Dutch Wonderland Inn (formerly Cartoon Network Hotel) at the same location, as well as the Gift Shop at Kitchen Kettle Village in nearby Intercourse, Pennsylvania.

Next to the park, they used to operate Wonderland Mini-Golf and Wonderland Cinema, which were demolished to make room for parking in 2014 and 2015, respectively. On November 12, 2010, Hershey Entertainment announced that they sold Dutch Wonderland to Palace Entertainment.

In early 2025, the park was sold to Herschend.

== Attractions ==
Dutch Wonderland features 32 rides, a water park called Duke's Lagoon (named for a purple dragon costumed character), along with shows and games for children. In addition to Duke the Dragon, the park also features costumed characters Princess Brooke, Merlin the Wizard and Sir Brandon, the Knight of Safety.

A five-acre island at the back of the park, "Exploration Island", includes a Prehistoric Path featuring more than 20 animatronic dinosaurs, the Turnpike, and Gondola Cruise.

=== Current roller coasters ===
Dutch Wonderland has three rollercoasters.

Ride	Opened	Manufacture	Notes
Merlin's Mayhem	2018	S&S Worldwide	A steel inverted rollercoaster, manufactured by S&S Worldwide, which passes over the Skyride and stands on the land the Turnpike once stood.
Kingdom Coaster	1992	Custom Coasters International (CCI)	A wooden rollercoaster, the first coaster ever built by Custom Coasters International. Uses a single Philadelphia Toboggan Company train with buzz bars. The park's monorail runs through the structure of the ride. The ride was once painted white, and is currently painted blue. It was named the Sky Princess until the 2007 season.
Joust	1998	Chance Rides	A steel "Big Dipper" style rollercoaster, manufactured by Chance Rides. It sits where the Flying Trapeeze once stood, in front of the Kingdom Coaster. Chance's prototype Big Dipper Coaster.

=== Other attractions ===
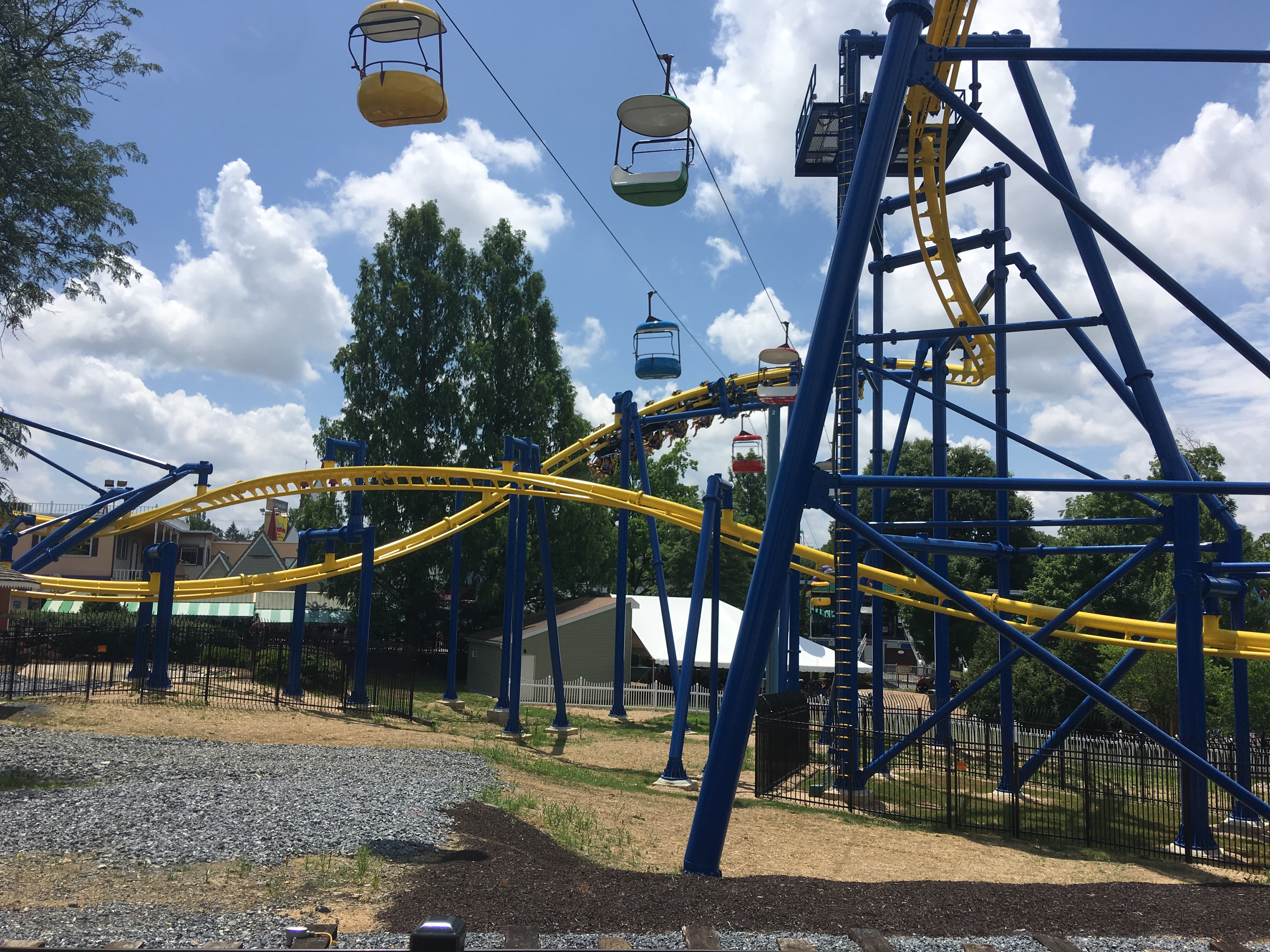
Merlin's Mayhem

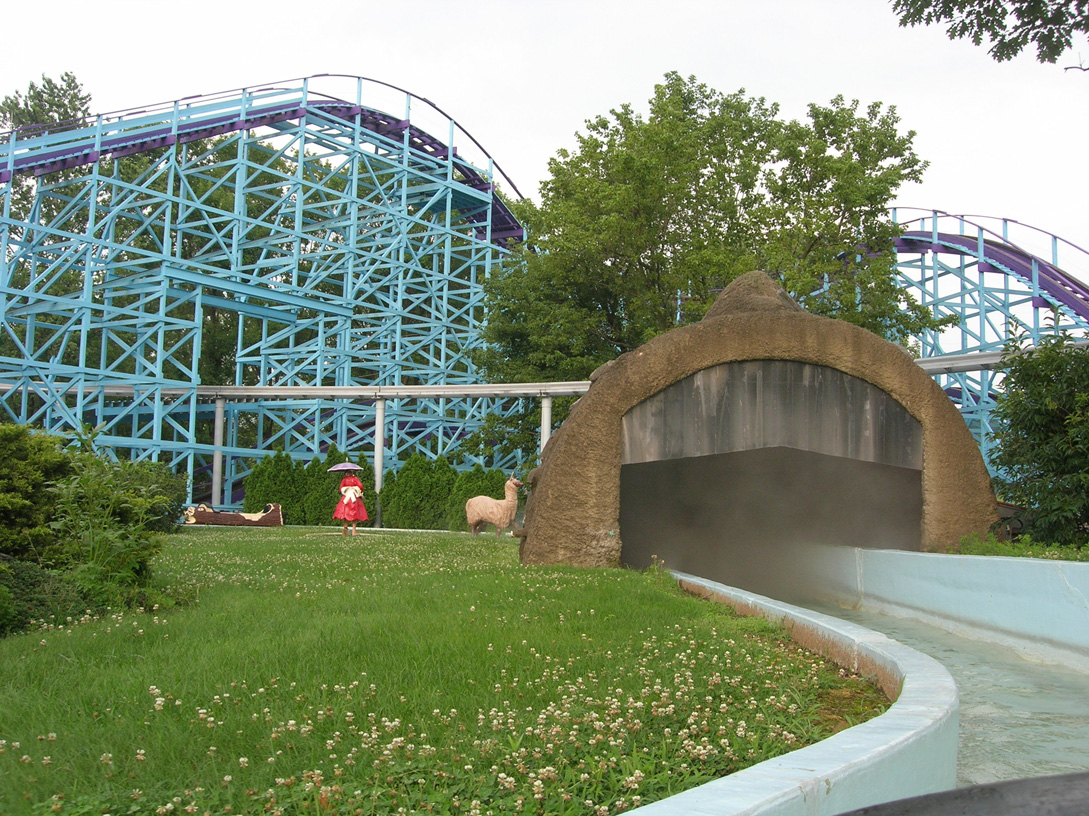
Kingdom Coaster and Double Splash Flume

Ride	Opened	Manufacturer	Description
Balloon Chase	2002	Zamperla	A Samba Balloon ride
Bumper Cars	1962	Lusse	A classic Lusse bumper car ride
Choo Choo Charlie	1992	Alter Ride Company	A manual-powered Crank 'N' Roll style ride.
Double Splash Flume	1977	Arrow Development	A double drop log flume (the lower drop at the beginning of the ride, the higher drop at the end) with a mist tunnel.
Dragon's Lair	2001	Arrow Dynamics	A boat ride, visible from outside the park. 1 of the 4 original rides in the park that before switching to log style boats were Whale Boats as well as Swan Boats
Duke's Dozers	2003	Allan Herschell Company	A kiddie ride where children ride in bulldozers, moved from Hersheypark where it had been called Earthmovers.
Wonder House	1964	In-House	A rare "haunted swing" ride, where the entire house revolves around the riders, described in a newspaper article as "an extremely disorienting effect" No longer has Dutch in the name.
Wonderland Special	1963 (DW opened with Allan Hershel Iron Horse ) 1974 (CP Huntington Train #123 Added to the park's lineup) 1985 (Original Iron Horse Train Removed) 1986 (The CP Huntington Train #206 was added) Although not all in operation, as of 2025, Dutch Wonderland houses CP Huntington Trains #123, #153, #202, #206 and #285.	Chance Rides	A 2-foot narrow-gauge railroad featuring a C.P. Huntington gasoline-powered locomotive built by Chance Rides, previously an Allan Hershel Iron Horse Train.
Flying Trapeze	1986	Chance Rides	A Yo-Yo chair swing ride
Frog Hopper	2003	S&S - Sansei Technologies	A Frog Hopper drop tower
Fun Slide	2000s	Unknown	A giant fun slide, relocated from Hersheypark.
Gondola Cruise	1970s	Arrow Dynamics	Part of the larger Exploration Island area
Honey Hop	Unveiled in 2025 but same ride unit since 1970	Hampton Amusements	Panda Party with a makeover
Kite Flight	2009	Zamperla	A Kite Flyer ride
Leapin' Frogs	2000s	Zamperla	A Frog-themed Jump Around ride
Monorail	1968	Universal Mobility	A monorail ride which takes a tour of the park
Merry-Go-Round	1999	Chance Rides	A family carousel ride
Off-Road Rally	2003	Venture Manufacturing	A family carousel ride
Panda Party	1970	Hampton Amusements	A bee ride, no longer in operation.
Pit Stop'	2000s	Outback Toys	A pedal car ride, no longer in operation.
Sky Fighter	1979	Molina & Son’s	A plane ride
Sky Ride	1969	Universal Design Ltd.	A station-to-station sky ride
Topsy Turvy Tea Party	Unknown	Unknown	A spinning tea cup ride
Turnpike Cars 2.0	1979	Gould Manufacturing	A reconstruction of the original Turnpike Cars formerly located in the middle of the park, it opened in 2014 on Exploration Island and is nearly double the length of the original.
Turtle Whirl	2007	Sellner Manufacturing	A classic tilt-a-whirl ride with a turtle theme purchased from Clementon Lake Park
The Twister	2009	Chance Rides	A family ride moved from Hersheypark (1978–2008)
Wonder Whip	2003	Mangles Company	A kiddie whip ride moved from Hersheypark, formerly called Wells Cargo (1964–2003)

- Dino Dig – Part of the larger Exploration Island area.
- Prehistoric Path – Features many animatronic dinosaurs. Part of the larger Exploration Island area.

=== Removed rides ===
- Wally the Whale Boats (1963–1967) – One of the original rides for the park. It was replaced by the Swan boats. .
- Swan train ride (1965–1967) – The "Gliding Swans" was a ride that drove through the path of the park, it only lasted for three seasons until it was removed due to increased foot traffic.
- Swan Boats (1968–1974) – A swan paddle boat ride that was replaced by log boats (now "Dragon's Lair"). .
- Original Iron Horse Train (1963–1985) – In 1974 the park added a second train, CP Huntington #123, which ran with the Iron Horse train. The Iron Horse train was removed after 1985 and replaced with CP Huntington #206 in 1986.
- Old 99 (1974–2002) – An electric train ride that went around a track by itself made by Chance Rides. The ride was eventually replaced with a theater.
- Giant Slide (1968–2007) – Replaced with two portable slides.
- Ripcord (1990–2010) – A parachute ride made by Venture Manufacturing, it was replaced with a Zamperla Kite Flyer.
- Ferris Windmill (1981–2012) – A kiddie Ferris wheel ride with a windmill theme, built by International amusements, the ride was removed for Exploration Island.
- Crazy Plane (1994–2014) – A Crazy Plane prototype made by Zamperla, the ride was removed after the 2014 season and was replaced by Bon Voyage Balloon Chase.
- Silo slide (1963–2015) – A slide that went down the exterior of a silo, its final year was 2015, the silo still stands today without the slide pieces.
- Lady Gay Riverboat (1963–2016) – An original ride from the park, it was modified many times since it opened, and the ride and the dock were eventually removed due to maintenance upkeep.
- Tug Boat (1967–2016) – A similar boat ride that came after the Lady Gay, the Tug Boat and Lady Gay would switch which boat was being used from time to time, until they both ceased operation in the park.
- Turnpike Cars 1.0 (1963–2013) – An Arrow Dynamics antique car ride that was located in the centre of the park, where Merlin's Mayhem is today. The attraction was reconstructed on Exploration Island for the 2014 season.
- Wiggle Racers – A ride where self-propelled scooters race around a track that includes a maze and a cave. This ride replaced the miniature train display which had replaced the indoor miniature circus display. The Wiggle Racers were then moved to a spot closer to the stream in the back of the park, and Huck Finn's Leapin' Frogs now resides in the footprint of the old miniature circus building.
- Astroliner (1978–2020) – an older space simulator that was added to the park in 1978, built by Wisdom Manufacturing, and removed in 2020.
- VR Voyager – a modern motion simulator removed in 2020.
- Space Shuttle (1985–2021) – A swinging ship ride built by Morgan. Removed in 2022.
- Panda Party (1970-2025) A bee ride by Hampton Amusements remade into Honey Hop.

=== Shows ===
- The Adventures of the Frog Prince – a high-dive show
- A Dragon's Tale – a high-dive show
- Storytime Corner – Princess of Dutch Wonderland and the Dutch Wonderland Knight read stories to children
- PBS KIDS Daniel Tiger Stage Show - based on the Mister Rogers' Neighborhood franchise.

=== Previous shows ===
- Bubba and the Badland Band (1989–2024) – A Sally Corporation animatronic stage show featuring six animal characters which performed popular country songs. The Dutch Wonderland show has since been preserved by the American Amusement Park Museum in Newville.
- The Star Girls From Planet Groove Rock This World!-A mid-2000s music show with an ARIA-nominated girls' group and kids' band from Sydney, Australia.
- Garfield the Great & Friends – A magic show based on the Garfield franchise.
- Thomas & Friends Live – based on the Thomas & Friends franchise.
- Danger Rangers Live in Safety Rules! – based on the Danger Rangers cartoon.

== See also ==
- Incidents at independent amusement parks
