= Tranan =

Swedish roller coaster

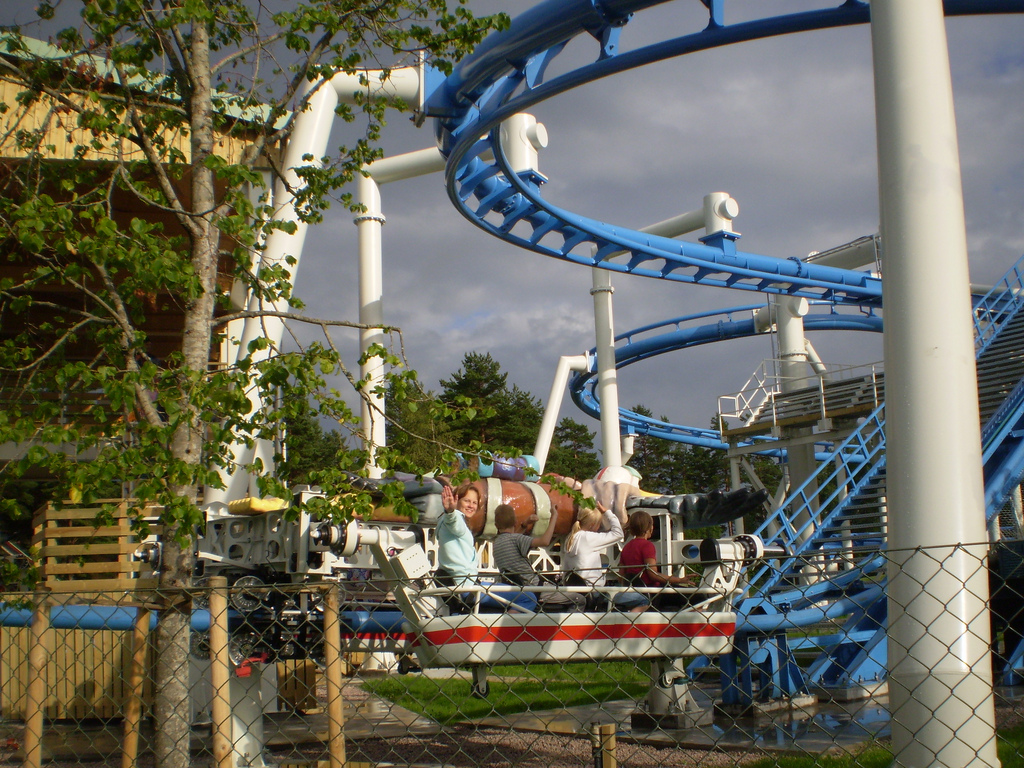
- One of Tranan's trains leaving the station

Skara Sommarland
- Location: Skara Sommarland
- Coordinates: 58.41°N 13.55°E
- Status: Operating
- Opening date: May 29, 2009
- Cost: SEK35 million

General statistics
- Type: Steel – Suspended
- Manufacturer: S&S – Sansei Technologies
- Model: Free Fly
- Lift/launch system: Chain lift hill
- Height: 65.6 ft (20.0 m)
- Length: 1,640.4 ft (500.0 m)
- Speed: 24.9 mph (40.1 km/h)
- Inversions: 0
- Duration: 64 seconds
- Capacity: 900 riders per hour
- G-force: 2.5
- Height restriction: 110 cm (3 ft 7 in)
- Trains: Several trains with a single car; riders arranged 2 across in 4 rows for a total of 8 riders per train
- Tranan at RCDB

Tranan (English: The Crane) is a suspended roller coaster located at Skara Sommarland amusement park in Sweden. The ride was manufactured by S&S Worldwide (now S&S – Sansei Technologies) as the company's only Free Fly model, and it opened to the public in May 2009.

== History ==
On 1 July 2008, a patent was filed by Timothy R. Jacobi and Stanley J. Checketts for a "Longitudinally Spinning Suspension Roller Coaster". This concept was later revealed to be a new model of roller coaster by S&S Worldwide named the Free Fly.

Shortly after the filing of the patent, Parks & Resorts Scandinavia announced their plans to add new roller coasters at three of their parks in 2009. This announcement included Tranan at Skara Sommarland which was the world's first Free Fly roller coaster. After a period of construction from late 2008 through to early 2009, Tranan officially opened to the public on 29 May 2009.

== Ride experience ==
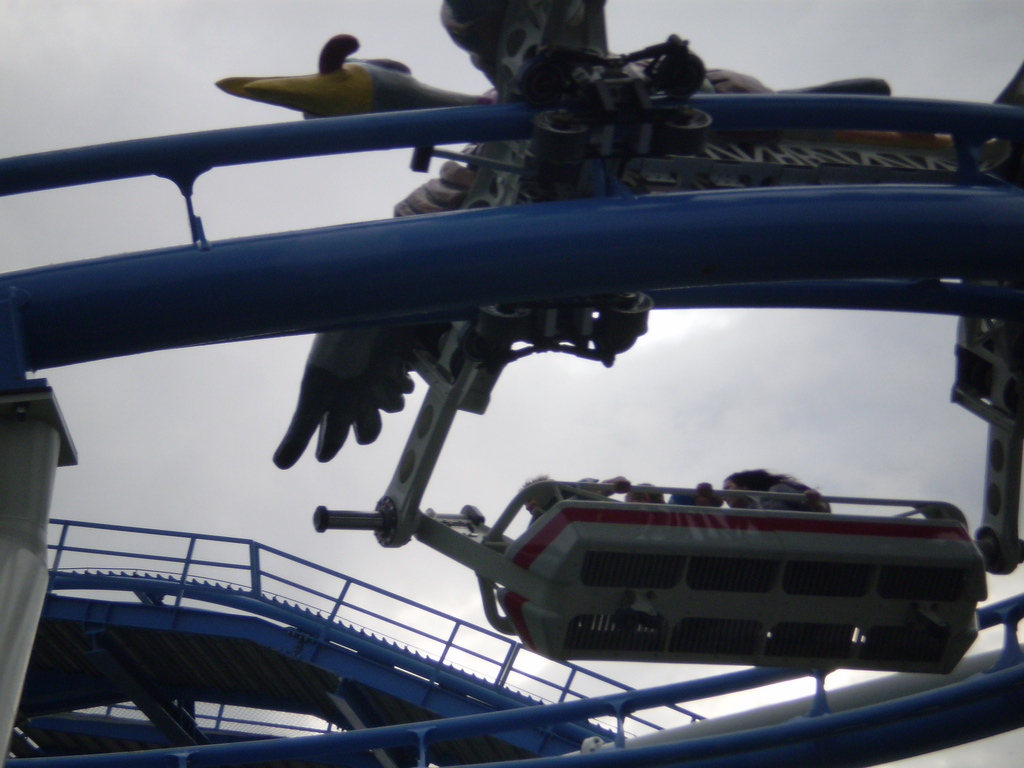
One of Tranan's trains passing overhead

The ride begins with a left turn out of the station. Upon reaching the top of the 57-foot-tall (17 m) chain lift hill, the train descends down a small dip into a series of helices and track inversions (one clockwise and one anti-clockwise). For the majority of the ride, the vehicles remain vertical with only slight banking occurring on various turns. Riders therefore do not experience traditional roller coaster inversions. On-ride photos can be purchased following the ride.

== Ride system ==
Tranan features four trains, each consisting of two, bobsleigh-style vehicles. These vehicles each seat four people inline and are suspended from a central, cantilevered support structure. The two vehicles, which rest on either side of a roller coaster track, feature an air suspension system which allows for smooth, longitudinal rotations. The ride was installed by Ride Entertainment Group.

== Reception ==
Tranan and the wider Free Fly concept was well received by park guests and the amusement industry alike. In late 2009, the Free Fly concept won the International Association of Amusement Parks and Attractions Best New Product Award in the Major Theme/Amusement Park Ride/Attraction category as well as the Impact Award. During 2010, S&S Worldwide was in discussions with several amusement parks about the opening of their own Free Fly rides the following year. However, as of January 2013, no other Free Fly rides have been built. S&S – Sansei Technologies have cited the ride's relatively low operating capacity of 480 to 600 riders per hour as a contributing factor as to why the ride didn't take off. As a potential market replacement, S&S Worldwide unveiled a new concept in 2012 which features trains seating between 24 and 32 riders. Seats would face both backwards and forwards with the ride experience featuring the same longitudinal rotations performed by the Free Fly.
