= Skara Sommarland =

Amusement park in Sweden

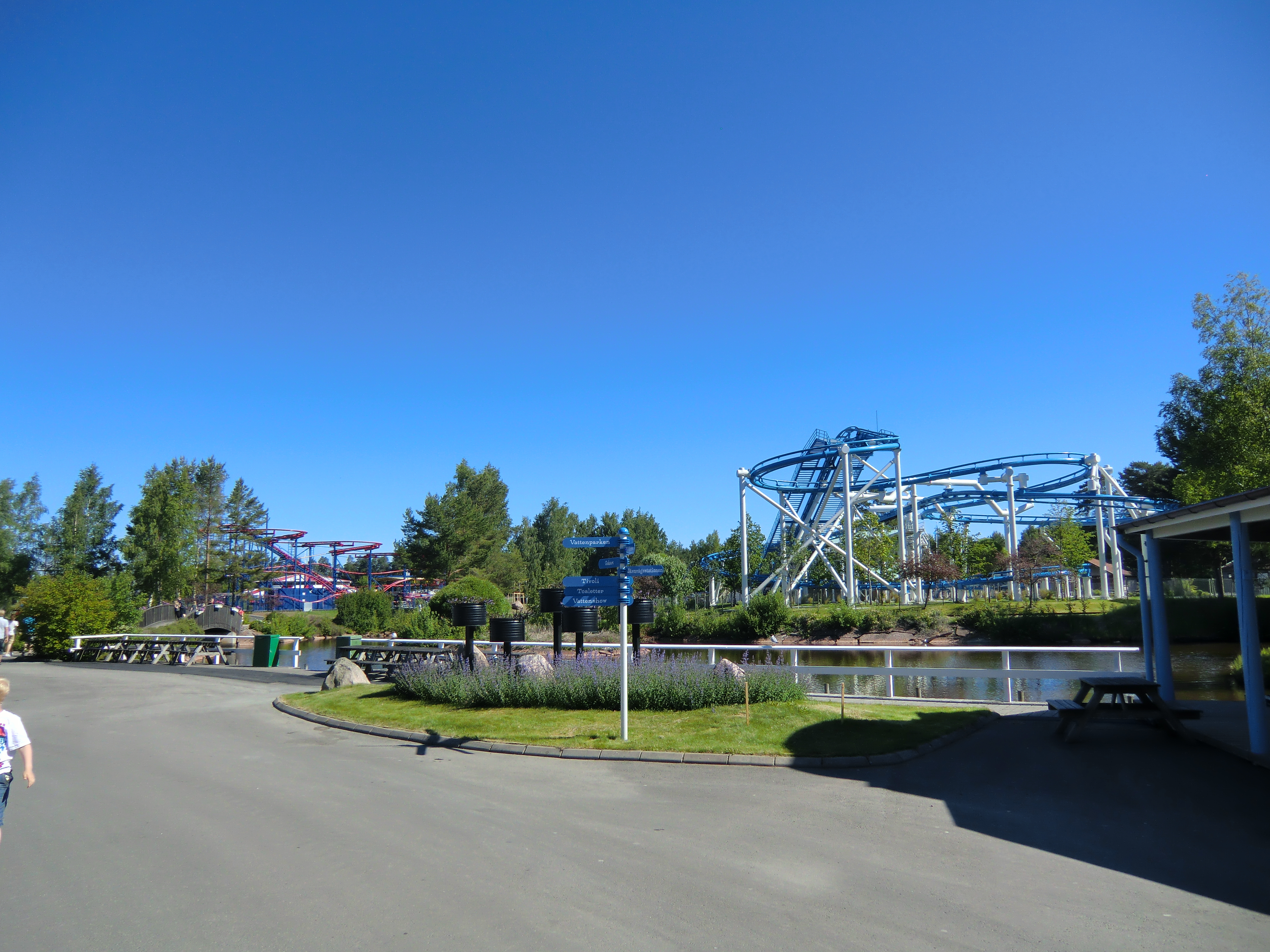
- Skara Sommarland
- Interactive map of Skara Sommarland
- Location: Skara, Västra Götaland County, Sweden
- Coordinates: 58.40423°N 13.552322°E
- Opened: 7 May 1984
- Owner: Parks & Resorts Scandinavia AB
- Operating season: June - August

Attractions
- Roller coasters: 3
- Website: www.sommarland.se

Skara Sommarland is a summer park located 8 km east of Skara. It was founded in 1984 by Swedish entrepreneur Bert Karlsson. The park attracts 350,000 visitors annually. During the 1980s, it once attracted circa 800 000 people within one year.

== Attractions ==
=== Roller coasters ===
Name	Manufacturer	Type	Opening date
Gruvbanan	Mack Rides	Powered roller coaster	1987
Spinner	Maurer Söhne	Spinning roller coaster	2011
Tranan	S&S Worldwide	Free Fly	2009

=== Former attractions ===
Name	Manufacturer	Operating Years	Replaced by
Stand Up	Intamin	1988-1994 (Relocated to La Ronde, in Montreal)
