= Thrust Air 2000 =

Air-launched roller coaster type

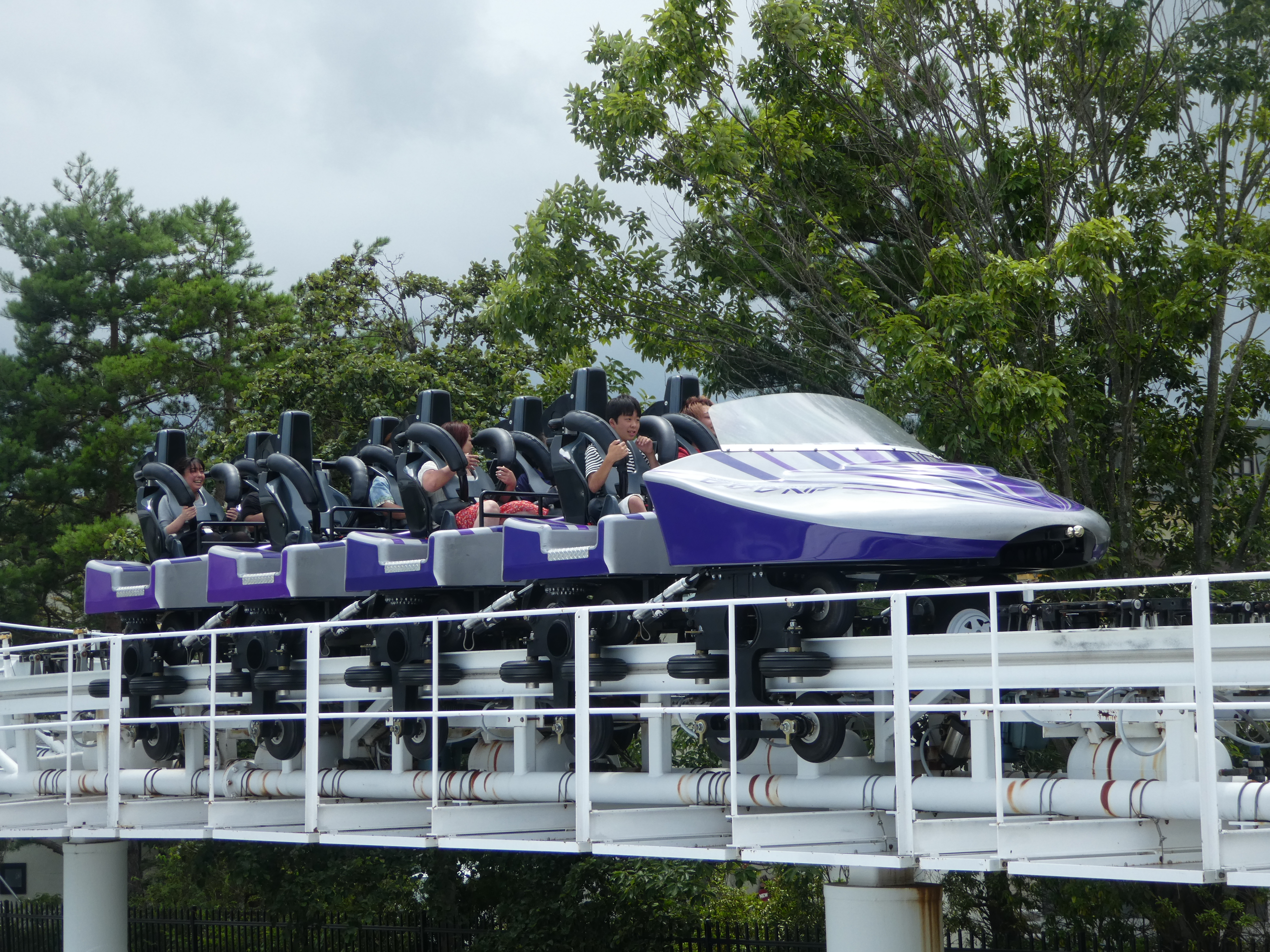
- Dodonpa at Fuji-Q Highland
- Status: Discontinued
- First manufactured: 1999
- No. of installations: 2
- Manufacturer: S&S Worldwide
- Restraint Style: Lap bar (HyperSonic XLC); Over-the-shoulder (Do-Dodonpa)

A Thrust Air 2000 (commonly known as a thrust air coaster) was a model of launched roller coaster made by S&S Worldwide that used refrigerated, compressed air to shoot a rubber-tired train down a steel track. A prototype model was created at the manufacturer's factory in 1999, then sold to Kings Dominion as Hypersonic XLC, which opened in 2001. Do-Dodonpa, located at Fuji-Q Highland, was the only production model in existence, opening in 2001 as well. It was once the fastest roller coaster in the world and held the record of the world's fastest acceleration on a roller coaster throughout its existence. Both models have since closed, and were originally fabricated by Intermountain Lift, Inc.

== Prototype ==
The prototype Thrust Air 2000 was made in 1999 at the S&S Power plant in Utah. That prototype was bought by Paramount directly from the plant and then built at Kings Dominion.

== List of Thrust Air 2000 coasters ==
Name	Height	Speed	Park, Location	Year opened	Status
HyperSonic XLC	165 ft (50 m)	80 mph (130 km/h)	Kings Dominion, Virginia	2001-2007	Removed
Do-Dodonpa	161 ft (49 m)	110 mph (180 km/h)	Fuji-Q Highland, Japan	2001-2021	Removed

=== Stats ===
- Height: 165 ft (50 m).
- Climb: 90 degrees
- Drop: 90 degrees
- Acceleration: 0-80 mph (0-128.7 km/h) in 1.8 sec
- Top Speed: about 80 mph (130 km/h)
- Launch System: Ingersoll-Rand screw type compressor
- Track layout: Out-and-back roller coaster
- Track type: I-beam
