= Hypersonic XLC =

Defunct roller coaster at Kings Dominion

- Hypersonic XLC in July 2001

Kings Dominion
- Location: Kings Dominion
- Park section: Candy Apple Grove
- Coordinates: 37.837155°N 77.445974°W
- Status: Removed
- Opening date: March 24, 2001
- Closing date: October 28, 2007
- Cost: $15,000,000 USD
- Replaced by: El Dorado (2009-2011); WindSeeker

General statistics
- Type: Steel – Launched
- Manufacturer: S&S – Sansei Technologies
- Designer: S&S – Sansei Technologies
- Model: Thrust Air 2000
- Track layout: Out-and-Back
- Lift/launch system: Pneumatic
- Height: 165 ft (50 m)
- Drop: 133 ft (41 m)
- Length: 1,560 ft (480 m)
- Speed: 80 mph (130 km/h)
- Inversions: 0
- Duration: 16 seconds
- Max vertical angle: 90°
- Capacity: 1,380 riders per hour
- Acceleration: 0-80 in 1.8 seconds
- G-force: 4.0
- Height restriction: 54 in (137 cm)
- Hypersonic XLC at RCDB

Hypersonic XLC was a roller coaster located at Kings Dominion in Doswell, Virginia. Hypersonic was built by S&S Worldwide (now S&S – Sansei Technologies), a company specializing in air-powered rides, and was the first compressed air launch coaster in the world. Hypersonic was S&S Worldwide's actual prototype for an air-launched coaster, called Thrust Air 2000.

The ride was originally fabricated by Intermountain Lift, Inc. It was reconstructed at Kings Dominion after being moved from its original location in Utah. S&S Worldwide also greatly modified the section following the 90° drop to accommodate Kings Dominion's landscape and to properly bank the turn.

In 2007, Hypersonic XLC was closed and later dismantled.

== History ==
In 1999, S&S Worldwide built a prototype roller coaster at their testing facility in Logan, Utah. It was called the Thrust Air 2000 and featured a unique one-of-a-kind launch system known as a compressed air launch. The prototype featured an oval layout with a 170-foot (52 m) top hat. The trains featured over-the-shoulder restraints and rubber tires instead of polyurethane wheels. The polyurethane wheels would cause a lot of noise during the launch. Originally, the coaster was supposed to be built at California's Great America, but those plans were scrapped.

On August 1, 2000, it was announced that Hypersonic XLC would be coming to Kings Dominion for the 2001 season. It would be one of the park's three launched roller coasters, with the others being Flight of Fear and Volcano: The Blast Coaster. To save on costs, the park decided to buy the Thrust Air 2000 prototype from the S&S Worldwide testing facility. The ride would have some differences from when it was originally built. These changes included lap bar restraints and a longer layout. Over 60 trucks carried the track and other components on a 2,200-mile (3,500 km) journey across the United States. Construction of Hypersonic XLC began in October 2000 when track pieces arrived at Kings Dominion.

Hypersonic XLC officially opened to the general public on time on March 24, the first day of the 2001 season.

The attraction suffered from constant downtime, since it was a prototype. Hypersonic XLC was closed for three months during the 2002 season to undergo modifications. On June 20, 2002, the ride reopened with a few minor changes.

During the 2006-2007 off-season, Kings Dominion put Hypersonic XLC up for sale. The attraction would operate for the final time in 2007. In January 2008, the park removed Hypersonic from its web site. On the park's opening day on March 22, 2008, Hypersonic XLC had been disassembled and was placed in its current laydown yard, along part of the park's back road.

In 2009, El Dorado took the spot of where Hypersonic XLC once stood. After its removal two years later, WindSeeker opened in its place in 2012. The platform is all that remains at the ride's former location between Grizzly and Twisted Timbers.

== Ride experience ==
After a launch from 0 to 80 mph (130 km/h) in 1.8 seconds up a 90° incline, the ride crested a 165-foot (50 m) hill, and without fully slowing, plummeted down a 90° dive. Next, the coaster performed a banked left turn, went through a smaller banked right turn, and skirted a small hill before heading into the brake run.

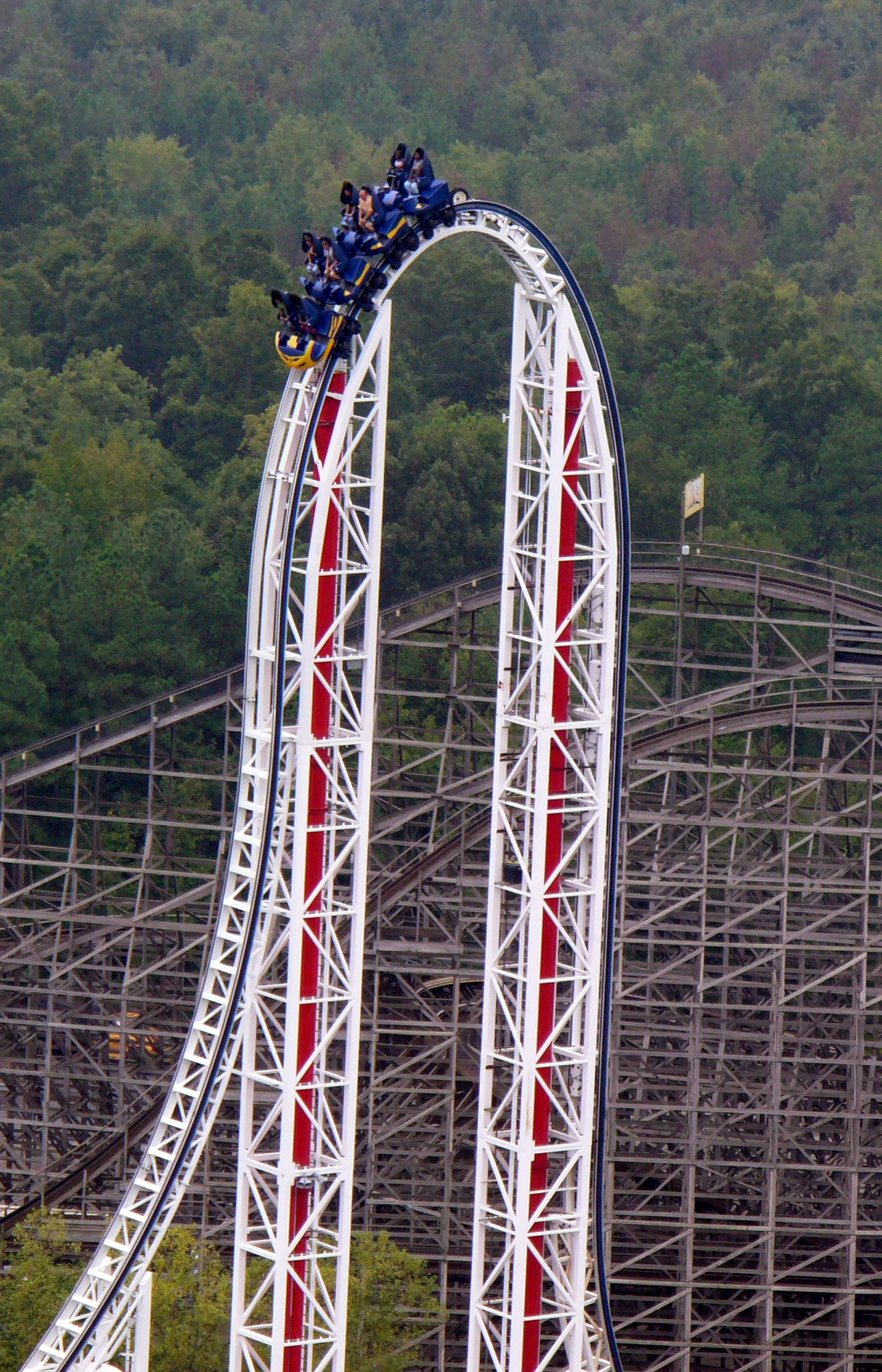
Riders face the 90° dive in front of the now defunct Hurler.

== Launch system ==
Hypersonic XLC's launch system was comparatively new technology utilizing compressed air to launch the ride train. It is very similar to the launch system used to launch Space Shot rides, also developed by S&S – Sansei Technologies. Characteristics of compressed air launches are shorter runways and quicker acceleration, when compared to hydraulic and LIM/LSM launch platforms.

The compressed air launch system was used on Do-Dodonpa, the world's fastest-accelerating ride prior to closing in 2024, which accelerated to 112 mph (180 km/h) in just 1.56 seconds. It was also used on Ring Racer and Maxx Force.
