= Cobra (La Ronde) =

Defunct roller coaster

- Previously known as Stand Up (1988-1994)
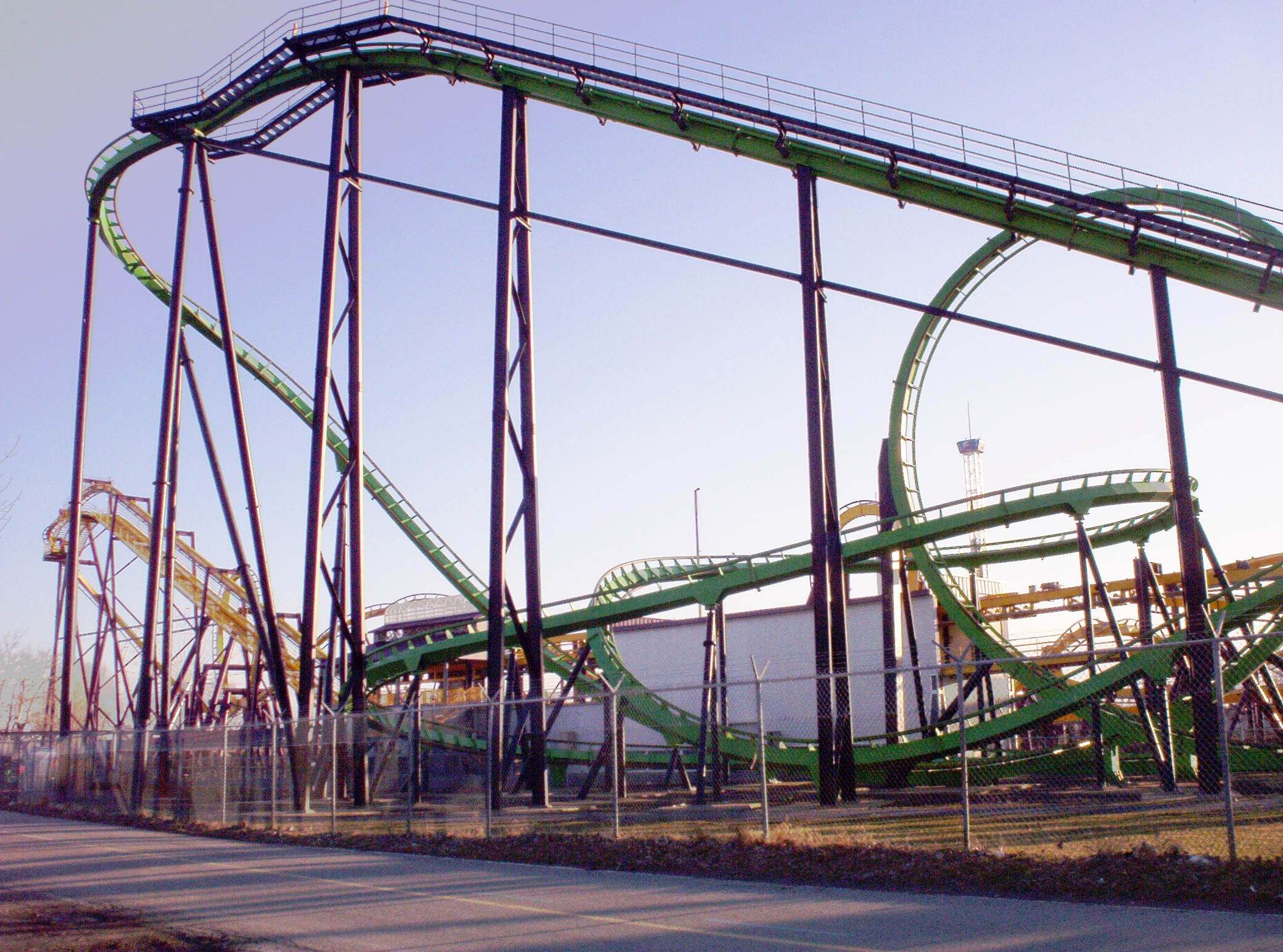

La Ronde
- Coordinates: 45.5219°N 73.5382°W
- Status: Removed
- Opening date: 1995
- Closing date: 2016

Skara Sommarland
- Coordinates: 58.404°N 13.552°E
- Status: Removed
- Opening date: 1988
- Closing date: 1994

General statistics
- Type: Steel – Stand-up
- Manufacturer: Intamin
- Model: Stand-up roller coaster
- Lift/launch system: Chain lift hill
- Height: 87 ft (27 m)
- Drop: 87 ft (27 m)
- Length: 2,575 ft (785 m)
- Speed: 48 mph (77 km/h)
- Inversions: 1
- Height restriction: 54 in (137 cm)
- Trains: 2 trains with 6 cars. Riders are arranged 4 across in a single row for a total of 24 riders per train.
- Flash Pass Available
- Cobra at RCDB

Cobra was a stand-up roller coaster located at La Ronde amusement park in Montreal, Quebec, Canada. Built by Intamin, Cobra opened to the public in 1988 at Skara Sommarland amusement park, where it operated until 1994. It reopened at La Ronde the following season in 1995 and was one of only three stand-up roller coasters manufactured by Intamin. Cobra was removed from the park's website in 2016 and then demolished in 2018.

== History ==
The roller coaster was relocated in 1994 from the Skara Sommarland amusement park in Sweden, where it was known as the Stand Up. In 2007, it was announced that a colony of Townsend's big-eared bats had settled in the ride's engine room. Le Cobra was a clone of the Shockwave coaster that was at Six Flags Magic Mountain, Six Flags Great Adventure and later at Six Flags AstroWorld as Batman The Escape. Cobra only had one inversion (a vertical loop), a turnaround dive hill and a helix through the only loop.
