= Lake Sagami Pleasure Forest =

Amusement park in Sagamihara, Japan

Coordinates: 35°36′17.53″N 139°12′22.08″E

Lake Sagami Pleasure Forest or Sagamiko Resort Pleasure Forest (さがみ湖リゾート プレジャーフォレスト) formerly known as Sagamiko Picnic Land (さがみ湖ピクニックランドss) is an amusement park in Sagamihara, Japan.

== See also ==
- Lake Sagami
