= Ring Racer =

Roller coaster at the Nürburgring

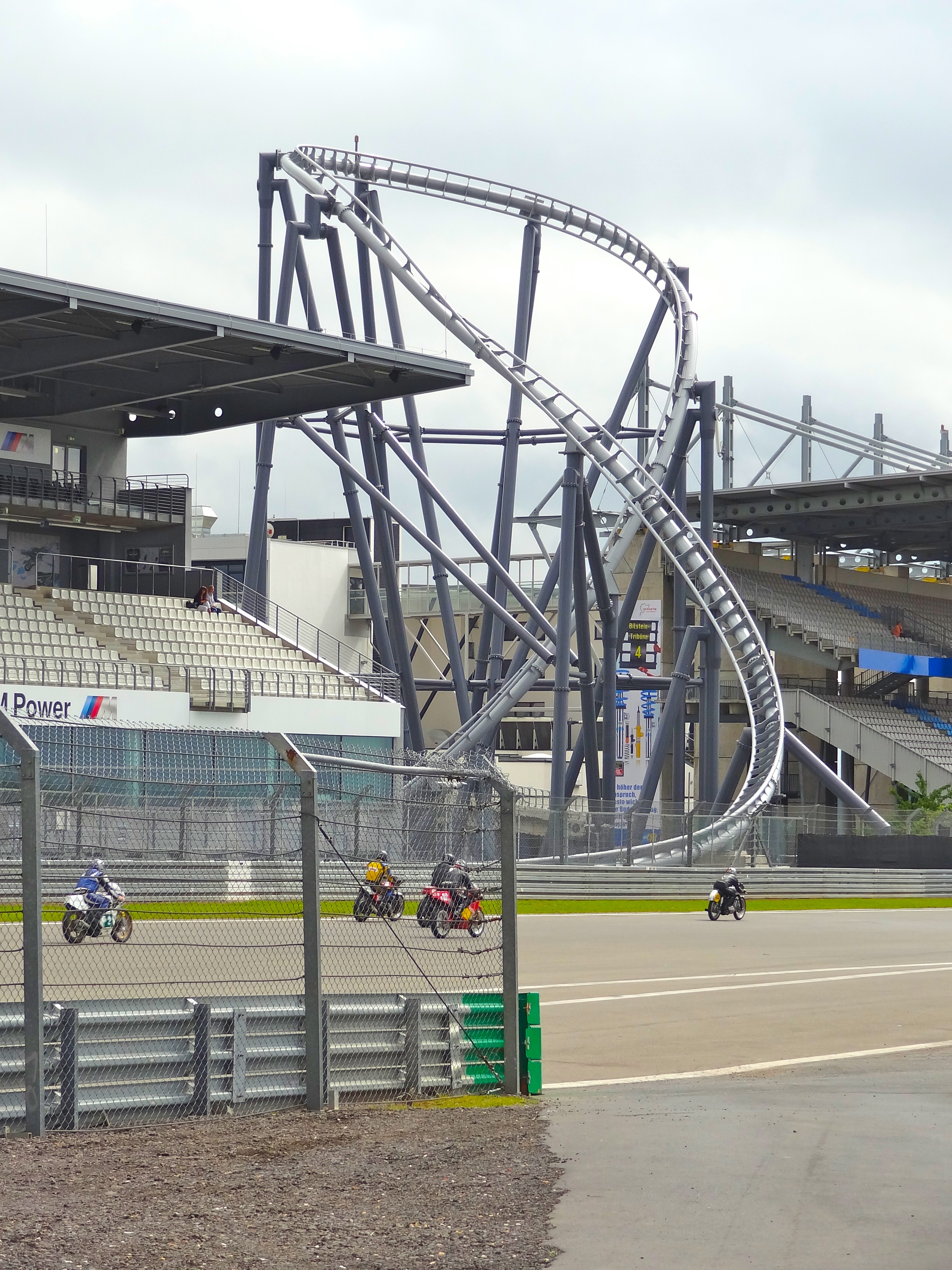
- Part of the Ring Racer's turnaround.

Nürburgring
- Location: Nürburgring
- Coordinates: 50°20′10″N 6°56′57″E
- Status: Removed
- Opening date: 31 October 2013
- Closing date: 4 November 2013

General statistics
- Type: Steel – Launched
- Manufacturer: S&S – Sansei Technologies
- Model: High-Thrill coaster
- Track layout: Raceway-style oval layout
- Lift/launch system: Pneumatic launch
- Height: 37.5 m (123 ft)
- Length: 1,212 m (3,976 ft)
- Speed: 160.0 km/h (99.4 mph)
- Duration: 85 seconds
- Capacity: 400 riders per hour
- Acceleration: 0 to 99.4 mph (0 to 160 km/h) in 2 seconds
- G-force: 5.6
- Height restriction: 55 in (140 cm)
- Ring Racer at RCDB

Ring Racer, stylized as Ring°racer, was a Formula One-themed roller coaster which was due to open on August 15, 2009 at the Nürburgring race course as part of the Nürburgring 2009 project.

It was originally planned to accelerate from 0 to 217 kilometres per hour (135 mph) in 2.5 seconds, parallel to the grand prix track. However, two defects in the launch system delayed its opening until 2013. On 3 September 2009, engineers attempted to raise the ride to its full and intended speed as it had been testing at a lower power, however this caused a series of explosions in the pneumatic system and caused injuries to seven people, and shattered multiple windows in the nearby buildings.

It was manufactured by S&S - Sansei and features a pneumatic launch. This accelerates the coaster from 0–99.4 miles per hour (160.0 km/h) in less than 2 seconds, double the acceleration of a Formula 1 driver in the same period of time.

According to the local state, Rhineland-Palatinate, the cost of Ring Racer accumulated to a total of 12.3 million Euro.

In 2014, it was announced by Nürburgring that Ring Racer wouldn't start running again as the ride is not economically viable.

In late July 2025 the coaster, after sitting standing but not operating for almost 12 years, was finally scrapped.

== See also ==
- 2013 in amusement parks
