= Kingdom Coaster =

Rollercoaster

- Previously known as Sky Princess
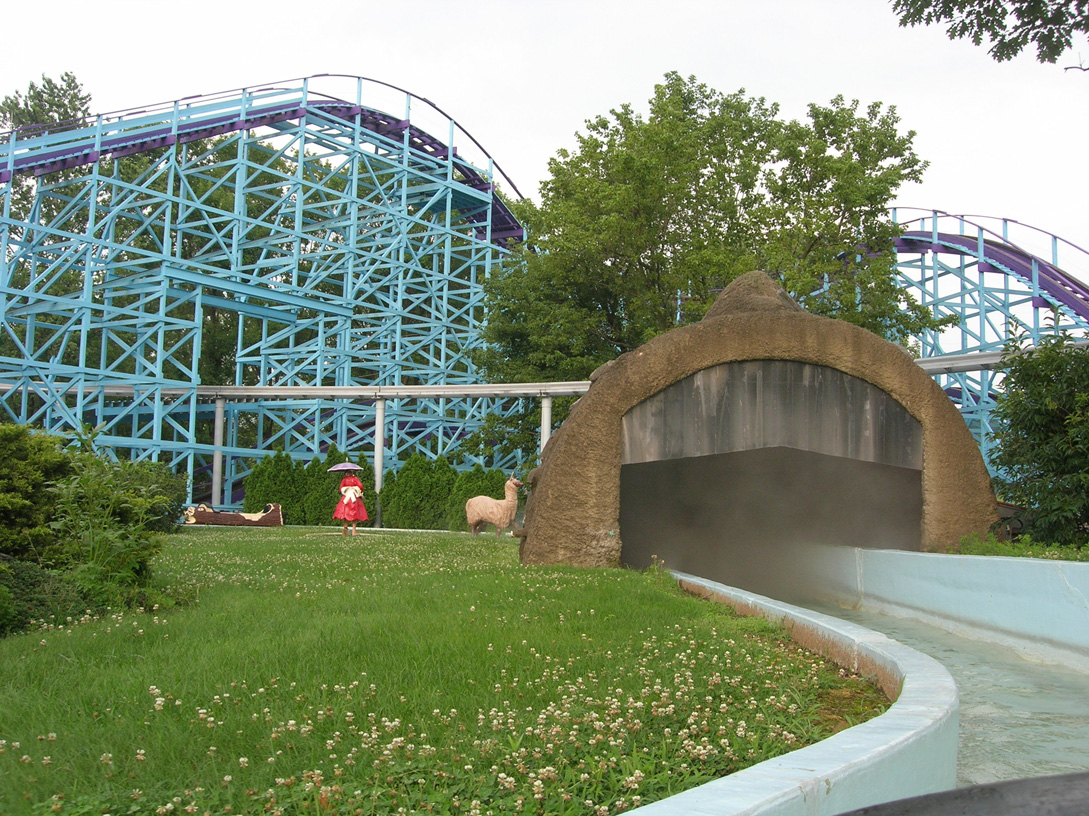
- Kingdom Coaster from the Double Splash Flume

Dutch Wonderland
- Location: Dutch Wonderland
- Coordinates: 40.02949°N 76.21735°W
- Status: Operating
- Opening date: May 16, 1992

General statistics
- Type: Wood – Family
- Manufacturer: Custom Coasters International
- Height: 55 ft (17 m)
- Length: 2,200 ft (670 m)
- Speed: 40 mph (64 km/h)
- Duration: 1:30
- Height restriction: 46 in (117 cm)
- Trains: Single train with 6 cars; riders arranged 2 across in 2 rows for a total of 24 riders per train
- Kingdom Coaster at RCDB

Kingdom Coaster (previously known as Sky Princess) is the name of a wooden roller coaster located at Dutch Wonderland near Lancaster, Pennsylvania. The first coaster ever built by Custom Coasters International, it uses a single Philadelphia Toboggan Company train with buzz bars. The park's monorail runs through the structure of the ride.

The coaster opened on May 16, 1992 under the name Sky Princess. It quickly developed a reputation as a fun, but relatively tame, ride befitting of the park's family oriented nature, while also attracting coaster enthusiasts from around the world, especially those who favored wooden coasters over the more popular metal coasters of the era. As the first coaster by Custom Coasters International, some have argued that the Sky Princess's debut in 1992 marked an important shift towards a trend of innovation and artistry in wooden coasters and a renewed interest in them.

The name was changed from Sky Princess to Kingdom Coaster prior to the 2007 season.

As of the 2017 season, the minimum height went from Amber (42"-47") level to 46". Anyone at that height or at the Sapphire (48"-53") Level need to go with a responsible rider of the Ruby (54" and up) level.

== Ride experience ==
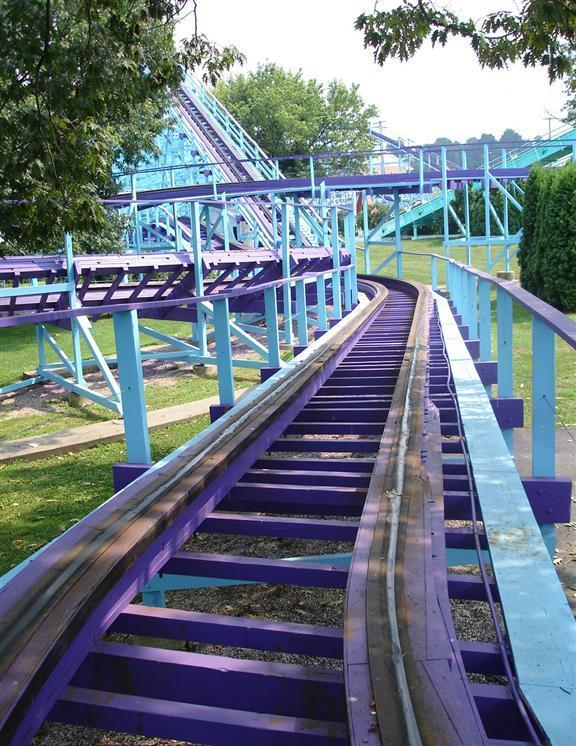
On-ride picture

After the train leaves the station, the ride makes two turns before riders climb the 55-foot (17 m) lift hill. After the 50-foot (15 m) drop, the ride turns and goes up a bunny hill. It is followed by many bunny hills, a tunnel, and even banked turns. Shortly after, the ride hits the brakes and returns the train back to the station.
