= Steel First =

Roller coaster

- Previously known as Snowball Express at Santa's Village AZoosment Park
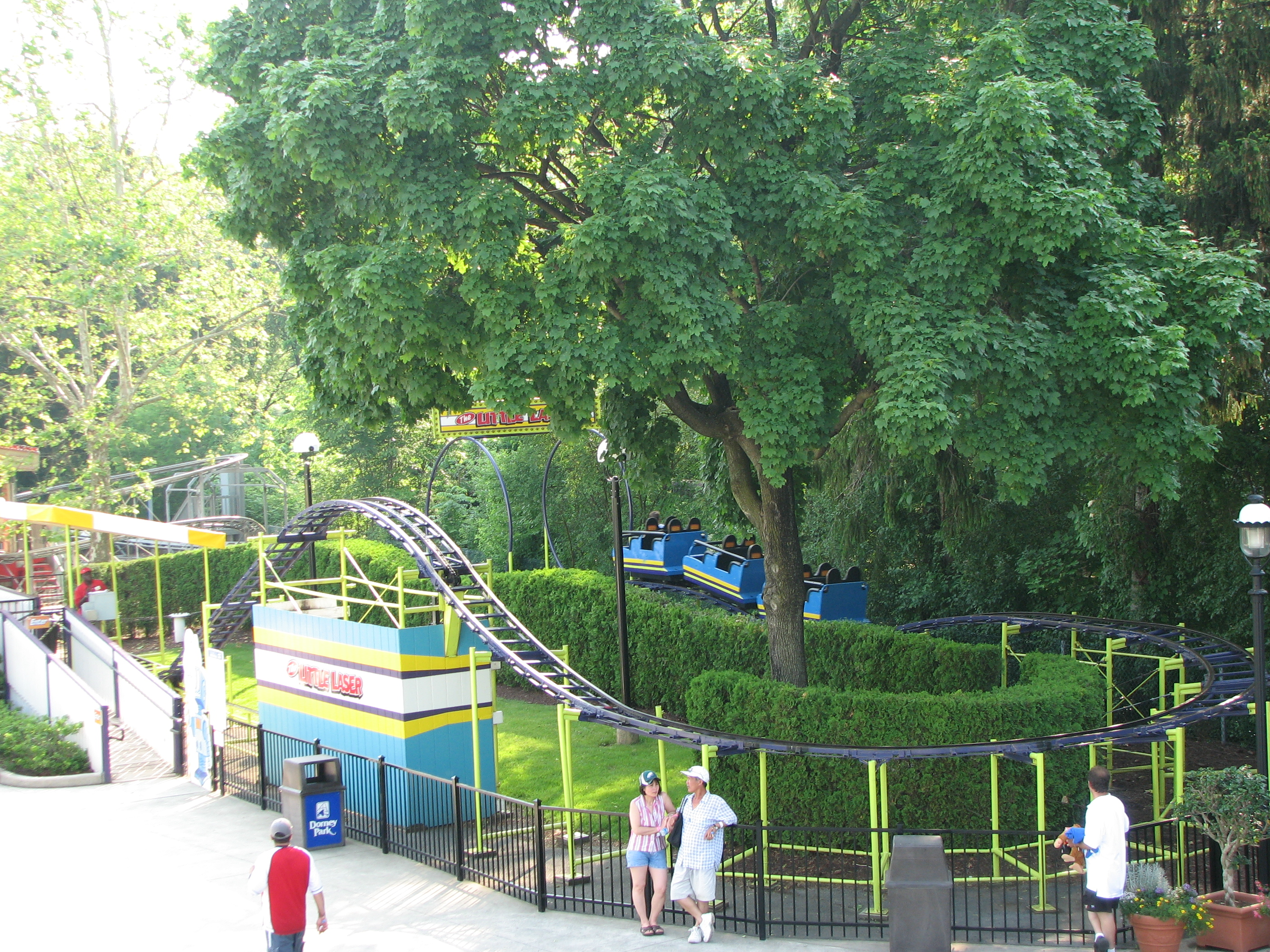

Dorney Park & Wildwater Kingdom
- Coordinates: 40.57776°N 75.53735°W
- Status: Removed
- Opening date: 1985
- Closing date: 2010
- Replaced by: Dragon Coaster

Santa's Village AZoosment Park
- Coordinates: 42.091°N 88.256°W
- Status: Removed
- Closing date: 1985

General statistics
- Type: Steel – Junior
- Manufacturer: Allan Herschell Company
- Model: Little Dipper
- Track layout: Oval
- Height restriction: 54 in (137 cm)
- Trains: Single train with 3 cars. Riders are arranged 2 across in 2 rows for a total of 12 riders per train.
- Steel First at RCDB

Steel First was a junior steel roller coaster located at Dorney Park & Wildwater Kingdom in Allentown, Pennsylvania. Manufactured by the Allan Herschell Company, the ride opened to the public in 1985.

The coaster was originally located at Santa's Village in East Dundee, Illinois, where it was known as Snowball Express. It was removed in 1985 and placed in storage, until it was bought and moved to Dorney Park. Its maximum rider height was 54".

It was originally named Colossus Junior & Little Laser after the defunct Laser coaster, but its name was changed to Steel First for the 2009 season, instead named for the Steel Force coaster. Steel First operated until the 2010 season, and has since been removed.
