= Dragon Coaster =

Dragon Coaster is the name of several amusement park roller coasters:

- Dragon Coaster (Dorney Park), built by Zamperla, Dorney Park & Wildwater Kingdom near Allentown, Pennsylvania
- Dragon Coaster (Playland), Playland in Rye, New York
- Dragon Coaster (Everland), Everland, Yongin, South Korea
