= White Water Landing =

White Water Landing may refer to:

- White Water Landing (Cedar Point), a water ride at Cedar Point in Ohio
- White Water Landing (Dorney Park), a water ride at Dorney Park in Pennsylvania
