= Thunder Canyon =

River rapids ride at Cedar Fair parks

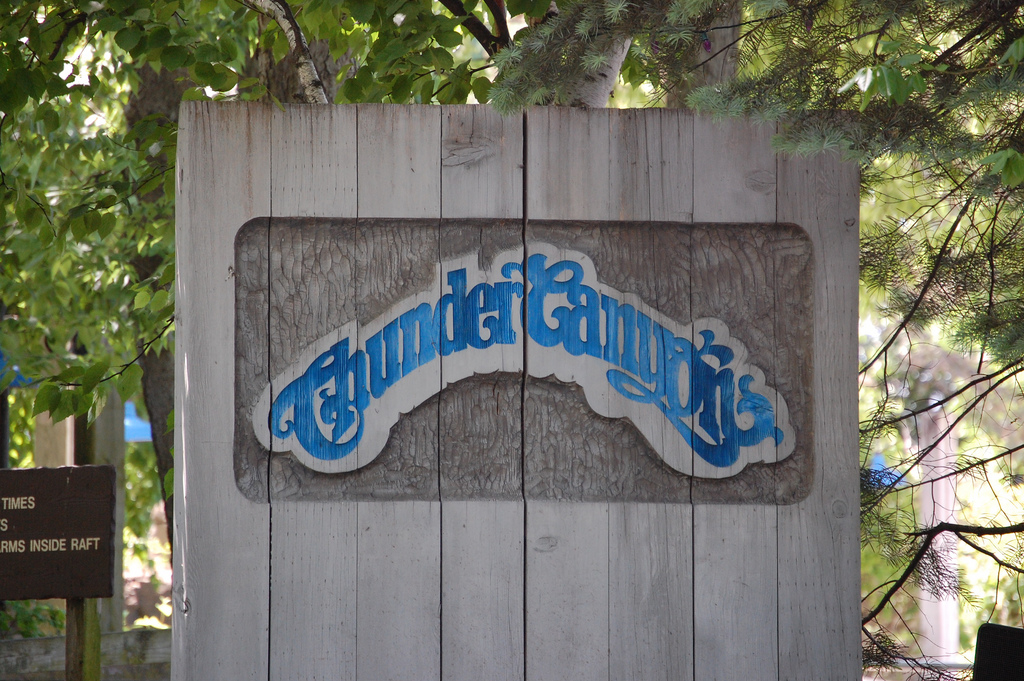
- Sign for the ride at Cedar Point

Cedar Point
- Area: Frontier Trail
- Coordinates: 41°29′1.66″N 82°41′30.80″W
- Status: Operating
- Opening date: 1986

Dorney Park & Wildwater Kingdom
- Status: Operating
- Opening date: 1995

Valleyfair
- Status: Operating
- Opening date: 1987

General statistics
- Type: River rapids ride
- Model: River Raft
- Length: 1,600 ft (490 m)
- Boats: Several boats. Riders are arranged 1 across in 6 rows for a total of 6 riders per boat.
- Restraint style: Ring in center of boat and seat belt
- Height restriction: 46 in (117 cm)
- Manufacturer: Intamin (Cedar Point); Barr Engineering (Dorney Park and Valleyfair)
- Fast Lane available at Dorney Park & Valleyfair

Thunder Canyon is a river rapids ride located at two Six Flags amusement parks and one Enchanted Parks and were installed when the parks were owned by Cedar Fair, Cedar Point in Sandusky, Ohio, Dorney Park & Wildwater Kingdom in Allentown, Pennsylvania and Valleyfair in Shakopee, Minnesota. All of the rides include water falls and water shoots.

== Information ==
=== Cedar Point ===
Thunder Canyon uses water pumped in from Sandusky Bay every morning instead of a closed water system on many other water rides. The ride closes every year in late August to be transformed into Cornstalkers 2.0: Revenge of the Pumpkin Heads, an attraction for HalloWeekends.

=== Dorney Park & Wildwater Kingdom ===
Thunder Canyon is located towards the back of the park. It can be found along the back path leading to Wildwater Kingdom while the ride itself is placed on four acres of land within the track of the Cedar Creek Cannonball. The attraction is 1,640 feet long, uses 200 horsepower pumps to generate the river using one million gallons of water at a rate of 112,000 gallons per minute, and was designed by Barr Engineering for the cost of $3.8 Million. This ride is unique compared to other rides of the same type for a few reasons. The ride is known for being one of the wettest version of its type. It is also known for its special use of its water reservoir, which instead of being hidden back stage, is used as a dramatic million gallon backdrop for the ride. Thunder Canyon is one of three water rides at Dorney Park, the other two being White Water Landing and Thunder Creek Mountain.

=== Valleyfair ===
Thunder Canyon is one of two water rides at Valleyfair, the other one being The Wave.

== See also ==
- White Water Canyon - River Raft ride located at other Six Flags parks.
- Thunder Canyon at Silverwood Theme Park is a river rapids ride with the same name.
