= Santa's Village Amusement & Water Park =

American amusement park

- Previously known as Santa's Village (1959–2005); Worlds of Fun (1972); Santa's Village Azoosment Park (2011)

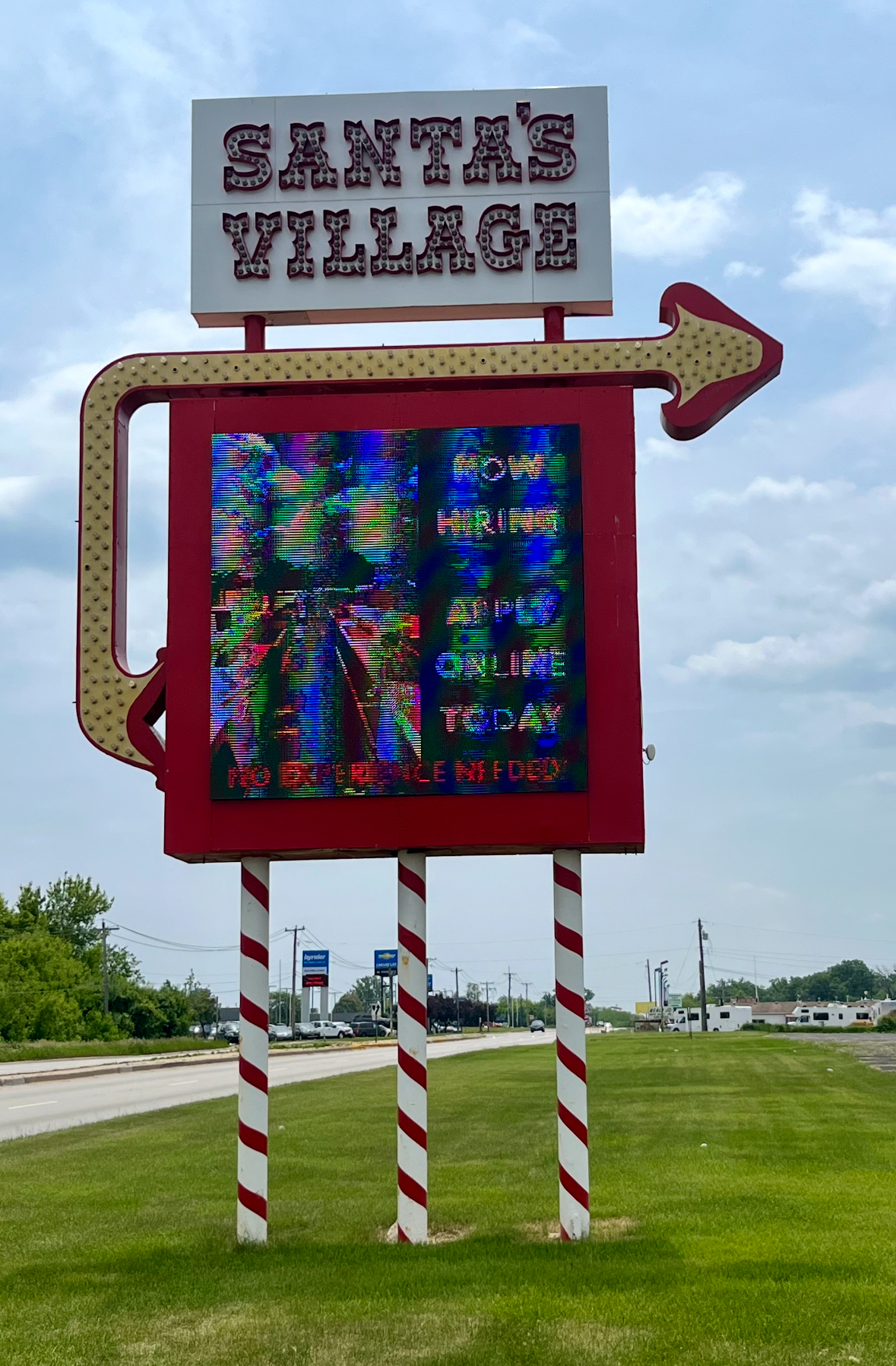
- Entrance sign
- Interactive map of Santa's Village Amusement & Water Park
- Location: 601 Dundee Ave; East Dundee, Illinois, U.S.
- Coordinates: 42.0907°N 88.2598°W
- Opened: May 30, 1959 (as Santa's Village); May 27, 2011 (as Azoosment Park); Santa's Village Amusement & Water Park (2021)
- Owner: Santa's Village LLC
- Slogan: Discover exciting rides, slides, animal attractions and more at Santa’s Village Amusement & Water Park, the place for FUN. FAMILY. MEMORIES.
- Operating season: Santa's Village Amusement & Water Park: May to August; Santa's Village Pumpkin Patch & Fall Festival: September to October; Santa's Village Magical Christmas Drive-Thru Experience: November to December

Attractions
- Total: 22 (as of 2026)
- Roller coasters: 3
- Water rides: 4
- Website: santasvillagedundee.com

Santa's Village Amusement & Water Park (formerly known and colloquially referred to as simply Santa's Village) is a theme park in East Dundee, Illinois. It was originally built by Glenn Holland, who also built two other Santa's Villages, in California; one located in San Bernardino County and the other in Santa Cruz County. The Illinois park, the third to be built, was intended to be the flagship of a chain of Santa's Villages across the country. However, parks planned for Richmond, Virginia, and Cherry Hill, New Jersey, were never built, and the park in East Dundee became the last of its kind.

The park operated as Santa's Village from 1959 until 2006, when it closed. Five years later, after extensive rehabilitation, the park reopened under new ownership. Renamed Santa's Village Azoosment Park because of the shared focus on both rides and animals, the Azoosment Park has nearly twenty rides and attractions, and hundreds of exotic and farm animals in an interactive environment. For a short time in 1972 the park was named Worlds of Fun. To avert legal feuds with other parks with similar names, the name was changed again to Three Worlds of Santa's Village. In 2021, the park updated its name to Santa's Village Amusement & Water Park.

== About the park ==
The buildings were modeled on what an average child might imagine Santa's Village would look like. When it opened, it was a very prominent theme park. Over the park's history more than 20 million people passed through the front gates.

Initially, admission to the park was free, and rides were purchased individually with colored coins which allowed riders a specific amount of time on the attractions. This model was eventually abandoned for a one-price admission policy with access to all rides, a model that continued until the end of the park's life.

== History ==
=== 1959–2006 ===
The park opened on May 30, 1959. One addition to the park, opened in 1963, was the "Polar Dome" which provided an ice skating and hockey venue under a forced-air supported dome. On November 28, 1966, a strong wind caused the "Polar Dome" to collapse. The dome was then replaced by a flat cedar roof, although the name of the venue was not changed.

During the 1960s, the park featured short Amphicar rides, which simply drove the riders about 100 feet (30 m) to the edge of a small lake, then out about another 100 feet, circled a pier and returned.

=== Three worlds (1972–2006) ===
In 1972, the park was purchased by the Medina Investors, who renamed it Worlds of Fun. However, to preclude involvement in trademark-infringing lawsuits with amusement parks employing the exact name, they renamed it again to the Three Worlds of Santa's Village.

- Santa's World: this was the original area and focal point of the park. It was located north of the Polar Dome. It had attractions such as Santa's House, where visitors could get a picture with Santa, the North Pole, a live theater, Frog Hopper, Balloon Ride, Snowball Ride, Giant Slide, Convoy, Train, and the Dragon Coaster.
- Old McDonald's Farm; this replaced the Reindeer Barn and consolidated all of the roaming animals to one spot in the park. It had attractions such as the Pony Ride, Petting Zoo, and Animal Pens where the animals were stored at night. The animals were sold before the park closed in 2006.
- Coney Island: this was the southern area of the park and last to be developed. It had many attractions such as Tilt-a-whirl, The Yo-yo, Himalaya, Galleon Ship, Bumble bee, and the Magic Show. This area is now occupied by Paintball Explosion.

In 1983, the park owners added Racing Rapids Action Park to the north end of Santa's Village.

Although the parks were connected, there were separate admission gates to either one. A combination ticket was available at either park that would permit visitors to enter both parks that day. Both parks had separate parking lots.

=== Water park (1983–2006, 2021–current) ===
The water park Racing Rapids was the water park attached to the north side of Santa's Village AZoosment Park. When it opened, it was one of the first in the Midwest and the largest in Illinois. It was closed with the park in 2006. The water park reopened for its full season in 2021 under the name "Santa Springs".

=== Closure (2006) ===
The unsuccessful launch of the "Typhoon" roller coaster, decreased attention to the aesthetics of the park, and a decline of patrons eventually prompted the corporation to sell. The sale did not proceed as smoothly as hoped and, with many setbacks and unmet deadlines, the park had to shut its doors.

In August 2006, the park announced its permanent closure. Most of the rides and fixtures were auctioned in October 2006.

=== Reopening (2011) ===
Santa’s Village reopened on one side of the original property, while the other side was leased to Paintball Explosion, which opened on April 30, 2011. Paintball Explosion converted the existing Polar Dome ice rink into an indoor paintball field and built six outdoor fields within the park, reusing many of the existing outdoor structures.

On the other half of the original property, Santa's Village reopened on May 27. It features over 20 mechanical rides, a water park, and a petting zoo.

=== Polar Dome reopening (2025) ===
The Polar Dome, initially used by Paintball Explosion for laser tag, was reopened on January 17, 2025, as an ice rink, alongside the Alpine Room Bar and Restaurant.

== Lists of attractions ==
=== Roller coasters ===
Ride	Manufacturer	Model	Year opened	Details	Ref
Wacky Worm	Fajume	Wacky Worm	2015	A Wacky Worm-type roller coaster relocated from Old Town in Kissimmee, Florida (2008–2014)	
Super Cyclone Roller Coaster	Interpark	Super Cyclon	2017	A Zyklon/Galaxi-type roller coaster.	
Farmer's Fling	SBF Rides	SBF Visa	2023	An SBF Visa family roller coaster with cars designed to look like pigs and cows	

=== Rides ===
Ride	Manufacturer	Model	Year opened	Details	Ref
Balloon Race	Zamperla	Balloon Race	1992		
Blizzard	SBF Visa Group	Frisbee	2021		
Country Carousel		Carousel			
Enchanted Experience				Virtual reality sleigh ride through a winter wonderland	
Kringle's Convoy			1988	A Convoy Ride by Zamperla.	
Lil' Monster Rally	Arrow Dynamics		2025	A track car ride. Formerly located at Joyland Amusement Park	
Mega Velocity	Eli Bridge Company	Scrambler	2016	Fast, classic ride with whirling, twirling, and twisting	
Midge-O-Racers	Eyerly Aircraft Company		2011	A Carousel ride. Formerly located at Kiddieland Amusement Park as Race-A-Bouts	
North Pole Expedition			2024	Dark ride via jeep through the north pole	
Pirate's Revenge		Swinging Ship	2023	Swinging Ship ride. Replaced the Viking Sea Dragon	
Reindeer Rocker			May 17, 2025	Rock out on our brand-new Reindeer Rocker! This rocking bench ride is sure to thrill kids and adults alike.	
Roto-Whip		Roto-Whip	2011	Formerly located at Kiddieland Amusement Park as Whip	
Route 66 Cruisers	Arrow Development	Antique Cars			
Snowball Ride			1962	Twirl and spin ride inside a snowball	
Snowman Spin Out		Bumper Cars		Formerly Ding 'em Dodge 'em Bumper Cars.	
Space Invasion				Formerly located at Kiddieland Amusement Park	
SVFD Engine No. 4				Version 4 of the fire engine ride, where riders put out a fire on a working fire truck	
Tilt-A-Whirl	Sellner Manufacturing	Tilt-A-Whirl	2011	Formerly located at Fun Spot Amusement Park & Zoo	
Tri-Nado	HUSS	Troika	2015	Formerly located at Fun Spot Amusement Park & Zoo	

=== Attractions ===
Ride	Year opened	Description
Bernyard		Barn with farm animals.
Koi Pond		Formerly known as Silver Slipper Pond (1959?) and Magic Pond
Old MacDonald's Barn	2011	Petting zoo formerly known as Reindeer Barn (1959–1971), Old McDonald's Farm (1972–2006), and Petting Zoo.
Reindeer Retreat		Deer Feeding Area
Santa's House	1959	Where you can meet and take pictures with Santa
Santa's Tree House Slide	1959	Formerly known as Tree House Slide
Tortoise Island		Turtle enclosure.

=== Water park ===
Ride	Year opened	Description
Lighthouse Harbor		10,000 sq. ft. splash zone with an 8 in. deep wading pool, zero-depth entry, and a two story play structure. Kids can enjoy 9 water slides, 2 giant tipping buckets, and a 50 ft. four-lane racer slide
Caribbean Curl		Open top red and green 300-foot long body slide
Peppermist Twist		Red and white enclosed 300-foot long body slide
Spearmint Twist		Green and white 300-foot long body slide
Coconut Competition	2025	Four lane mat racer slide

=== Other venues ===
Venue	Year opened	Description
Aviary	1959	Formerly known as Christmas Around the World Post Office
Birthday Party		
Frozen North Pole	1959	Frozen Pole of ice located by Santa's House. Originally located in the North Pole Plaza
Midway Games		

=== Food and beverages ===
Venue	Year opened	Description
Picnic Area		Formerly known as Reindeer Glen Picnic Grove
Arctic Circle Ice Cream Shop	2011	Formerly known as Mrs. Claus's Candy Kitchen (1959–?)
Picnic Pavilion		
Ginger Bread Cafe	2011	Formerly known as The Gingerbread House (1959–?)
Reindeer Ridge / Beer Garden		Formerly known as Wee Puppet Theater/Hoffbrau House
Backyard BBW		Formerly known as Wee Puppet Theater/Hoffbrau House

== List of former attractions ==
Ride	Year opened	Year closed	Description
Alpine Room	1967		Lounge in the Polar Dome.
Amphicar			Amphibious Car that went through the pond.
Antique Cars	1962	2006	Antique car ride
Astro-liner			Motion Simulator by Wisdom Industries. A rocket ship that simulated a space mission.
Bumble Bee ride			
Bumper Cars			Had two types of Bumper Cars. In the 1970s, it was designed to resemble a racetrack and was known as the Dundee Zizzler 500 Raceway.
Burro Ride	1959		Children could ride on a live burro through the forest.
Candy Cane Coaster	1964	1966	
Candy Cane Slide			Circular slide.
Cannon Ball		1986	Roller Coaster replaced by the Dragon Coaster.
Chapel of the Little Shepard	1959		A small all faith chapel that reflected on children's bible stories through small exhibits.
Cinderella's Pumpkin Coach	1959		A life-size coach that guests could ride in that was pulled by miniature white ponies. The turn-a-round area contained a static display of Prince Charming's Castle.
Christmas Around the World Post Office	1959		A large building that housed many exhibits and services such as an actual post office, letter writing to Santa, exhibit windows of the celebrations of Christmas around the world, a souvenir counter, guest services, and rest rooms. Offices were located on the second floor.
The Christmas Tree ride	1959	1992	A giant whirling tree teacup ride where guests could ride in a Christmas ornament that would go up and down with the pull of a lever. Replaced by the Balloon Ride.
Circus Wagon			Trolley Ride
The Doll House	1959		Doll shop with dolls from around the world.
Dracor	1986	1994	Zamperla roller coaster
Dragon Coaster	1986	2006	A Powered roller coaster by Zamperla. Also known as Dracor, the Dragon Coaster (1986–1994). Now located at Vertical Endeavors in Warrenville, Illinois.
Dragon Coaster	2011	10/30/2016	A family coaster by Wisdom Rides. Relocated from Go Bonkers Now in Arlington Heights, Illinois at Rexo Coaster (2000–2010). Opening at Joyland Amusement Park in Lubbock, Texas in 2017
The Easter Bunny's Hut	1959		Large egg shaped house where kids could take pictures with the Easter Bunny.
English Rotor			Spinning Rotor Ride
Fire Truck Ride	197?	2006	Trolley pulled by a fire truck. Riders use working fire hoses to put out fires along the route.
Fire Chief		2006	Crazy Bus ride
Frog Hopper		2006	Drop Tower
Galaxi	1987	1996	Roller Coaster by S.D.C. Sold to a park in Mexico.
Galleon		2006	A pirate ship ride by Zamperla.
Gas powered tractors	1959		Actual small tractors that children could drive.
Giant Slide			
Gingerbread House	1959		An actual working bakery that featured gingerbread cookies and baked goods. Large windows allowed guests to watch as "Pixies" made the sweet treats. The Gingerbread House was also home to the "Good Witch" and the "Lollipop Lady". Right behind the outside fireplace, children could accompany the "Lollipop Lady" and pick a sucker from the lollipop tree.
Great Wheel	1995	2006	Ferris Wheel bought by Grizzly Jack's Grand Bear Resort.
Hampton Ride		2006	
The Himalaya		2006	
Igloo	1959		A small concrete igloo that originally served small ice cream novelties.
Jolly Trolly	2021	2022	Trolly dark ride by Majestic Rides. Replaced by North Pole Expedition.
Kiddie Kars		2006	
Jack in the Box	1959		A snow cone stand that looked like its name.
Lil' Stinger		2006	
The Magic Train	1959	1961	A small train ride around a fairy tale themed area. Removed for Antique Cars.
Merry-Go-Round	1966	2006	
Mill Wheel Workshop	1959		An artisan's shop that also sold manufactured toys.
Miner's Run	2011		Pedal Cars
Mrs. Claus’ Candy Kitchen	1959		A large building that was a candy shop that sold hand-dip chocolates and hard candies. Mrs. Claus was on hand each day to supervise.
Old Engine 99	1964	1966	
Paddle Boats			Paddle boats in the pond
Pixie Pantry	1959		The Park's largest eating facility that served sit down meals cafeteria style in the main section and hamburgers, hotdogs, and typical fast food through a walk-up window.
Pixie Press			Trained animals working a printing press. Children could subscribe to the news print and have it delivered to their homes.
Polar Dome	1963	2006	Ice Skating Rink. Originally had a forced-air dome roof that measured 87 feet from the ice surface. The dome was replaced by a flat roof in 1966 after a storm damaged it.
Pony Carts	1966	1987	Replaced by the Convoy Ride.
Reindeer Barn	1959		Santa's reindeer actually lived in the barn. There were eight stalls and at the north end of the barn, "Inky" the reindeer, along with his friends "Peck" the chicken and "Hunt" the duck printed the Park's official newspaper, The Pixie Press.
Rock Spin 'N Roll		2006	
Rollo Plane			A Roll-O-Plane by Eyerly Aircraft Company. Nicknamed the Salt and Pepper Shakers.
Santa's Express	1962	2006	Train ride added in 1962 to replace The Magic Train. Replaced the CP Huntington Train with a new Amtrak train in 1994.
Santa's Gift Shop	1959		One of the largest buildings in the Park, the shop was divided into three sections, toys for children, gifts for mom and dad, and a Christmas shop.
Silver Streak	1981	1981	Spillman Engineering.
Skyliner		2006	Chair lift
Snowball Express		1985	Roller Coaster by Allan Herschell Company. Located at Dorney Park & Wildwater Kingdom in Allentown, Pennsylvania, as Steel First until 2010.
Snowball Ride	1962	2006	Teacup ride now located at Grizzly Jack's Grand Bear Resort.
Space Ships		2006	
Star Jets		2024	Replaced by Lil' Monster Rally.
Storybook House	1959		A small shop that handled children's books and souvenirs.
Swiss Toboggan	1971		Roller Coaster by Chance Morgan.
Tarantula			Spider ride
The Toy Soldier	1959		A giant toy drum with a tall toy soldier on top that was actually a "duck pond game" with little toy boats instead of rubber ducks.
Typhoon	1997	2006	Roller Coaster by Top Fun. Bought by Ray Cammack Show company a traveling carnival operator based in Arizona for $250,000.
Viking Sea Dragon	2011	2022	A swinging ship ride by Chance Morgan. Formerly located at Fun Spot Amusement Park & Zoo. Replaced by Pirate's Revenge.
Wee Puppet Theatre	1959		Daily hand and marionette puppet shows in an indoor theatre.
WildCat	June 28, 2014	2015	Pinfari mini steel roller coaster. Sold to someone in Texas.
Wipeout	1992	2006	Spin ride
Wishing Well	1959		A small outdoor seated area where folks could relax and children could drop pennies into a well for a secret wish.
Woodanimals	1959		Large wood log sculptures that children can sit and climb on.
Worlds Largest Christmas Stocking	1959		A large stocking that was raffled off.
Xtreme Elevation	2015	2023	Drop Tower By ARM
The Yo-yo	1990	2006	Swing Ride by Chance Morgan.

== See also ==
- Santa's Village (Lake Arrowhead)
