= Thunderhawk (Dorney Park) =

Roller coaster at Dorney Park

- Previously known as The Coaster (1924–1989)
- Thunderhawk in July 2001

Dorney Park & Wildwater Kingdom
- Location: Dorney Park & Wildwater Kingdom
- Coordinates: 40.5798°N 75.5355°W
- Status: Operating
- Opening date: March 30, 1924; 102 years ago

General statistics
- Type: Wood
- Manufacturer: Philadelphia Toboggan Coasters
- Designer: Herbert Paul Schmeck
- Track layout: Out and Back / Twister
- Lift/launch system: Chain lift hill
- Height: 80 ft (24 m)
- Drop: 65 ft (20 m)
- Length: 2,767 ft (843 m)
- Speed: 45 mph (72 km/h)
- Inversions: 0
- Duration: 1:18
- Max vertical angle: 45°
- Height restriction: 48 in (122 cm)
- Trains: 2 trains with 4 cars; riders arranged 2 across in 3 rows for a total of 24 riders per train
- Fast Lane available
- Thunderhawk at RCDB

Thunderhawk is a wooden roller coaster with an out-and-back layout located at Dorney Park & Wildwater Kingdom in Allentown, Pennsylvania. Originally opening as The Coaster in 1924, Thunderhawk was the oldest operating roller coaster in the former Cedar Fair chain, and is one of the oldest in the world still in operation. It was manufactured by Philadelphia Toboggan Coasters (PTC) and designed by Herbert Paul Schmeck.

== History ==
Thunderhawk was designed by Herbert Paul Schmeck and built by PTC. When Thunderhawk opened on March 30,1924, it was known simply as "The Coaster". It was renamed Thunderhawk in 1989.

Originally, The Coaster was an out-and-back coaster, meaning it went straight out from the first drop, turned around, and came straight back through several smaller hills. The ride was reconfigured in 1930 to its present design with a figure-eight twister section in the middle of the ride. The ride also originally began with a tunneled section and ended with another tunneled section, as the train went under a portion of a pavilion which housed bumper cars.

For the 2016 season, Dorney Park announced major renovations to Thunderhawk. Among the changes were new trains designed by PTC, featuring an open-air design, with individual ratcheting lap bars (as opposed to the previous "buzz bars"). The ride also received a new coat of white paint, reminiscent of the coaster's original color, and a new white lighting package to outline the entire ride.

In 2021, the American Coaster Enthusiasts (ACE) gave Thunderhawk an ACE Coaster Landmark plaque. In 2024, Thunderhawk was given a new and refurbished train, decorated with a "100th Anniversary" insignia to commemorate its 100th year of operation.

== Incident ==
On July 21, 1990, two trains on Thunderhawk collided at the bottom of the lift hill. 17 people were taken to local hospitals to receive treatment for minor injuries. It is unknown what caused the accident, as certified ride operators tested the ride after the accident and found nothing mechanically or physically wrong with it; however, the parks spokeswomen said that operator error may have caused the accident. The ride was closed immediately after the accident happened and re-opened the next day.
