= Demon Drop =

Drop tower amusement ride

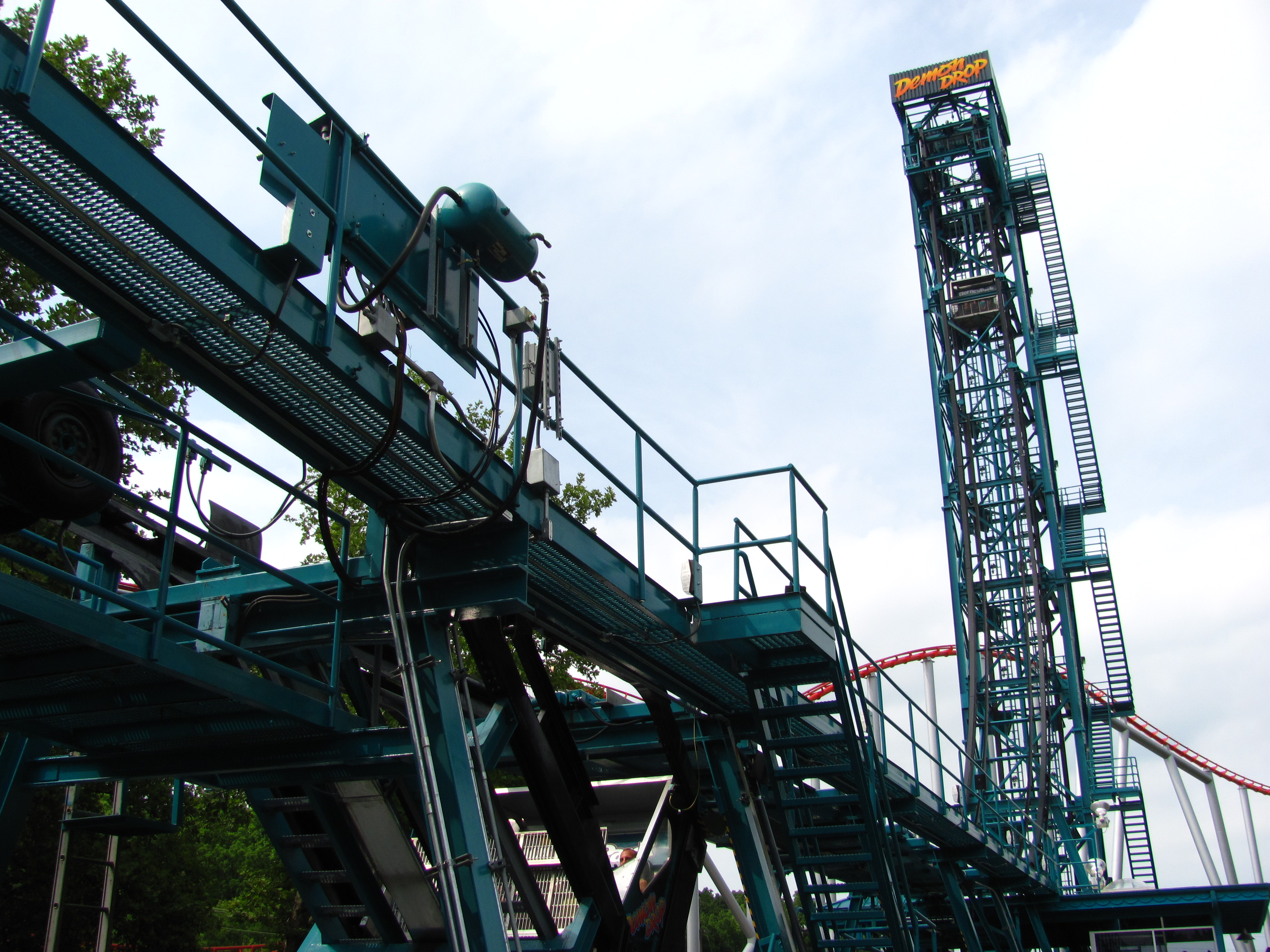
- Demon Drop at Dorney Park

Dorney Park & Wildwater Kingdom
- Status: Operating
- Opening date: July 8, 2010
- Replaced: Krazy Kars

Cedar Point
- Status: Relocated to Dorney Park & Wildwater Kingdom
- Opening date: 1983
- Closing date: November 1, 2009
- Replaced by: Ocean Motion - Relocation within park.

Ride statistics
- Attraction type: Freefall
- Manufacturer: Intamin
- Model: 1st Generation Freefall
- Height: 131 ft (40 m)
- Drop: 60 ft (18 m)
- Speed: 55 mph (89 km/h)
- Vehicles: 6
- Riders per vehicle: 4
- Height restriction: 48 in (122 cm)
- Restraints: Over-the-shoulder restraints

Demon Drop is a drop tower amusement ride located at Dorney Park & Wildwater Kingdom in Allentown, Pennsylvania. Designed by Intamin, it is a Freefall model that was originally located at Cedar Point that opened in 1983. It was relocated to Dorney Park following the 2009 season, where it reopened in 2010. It is one of the oldest rides of its kind still in operation.

== History ==
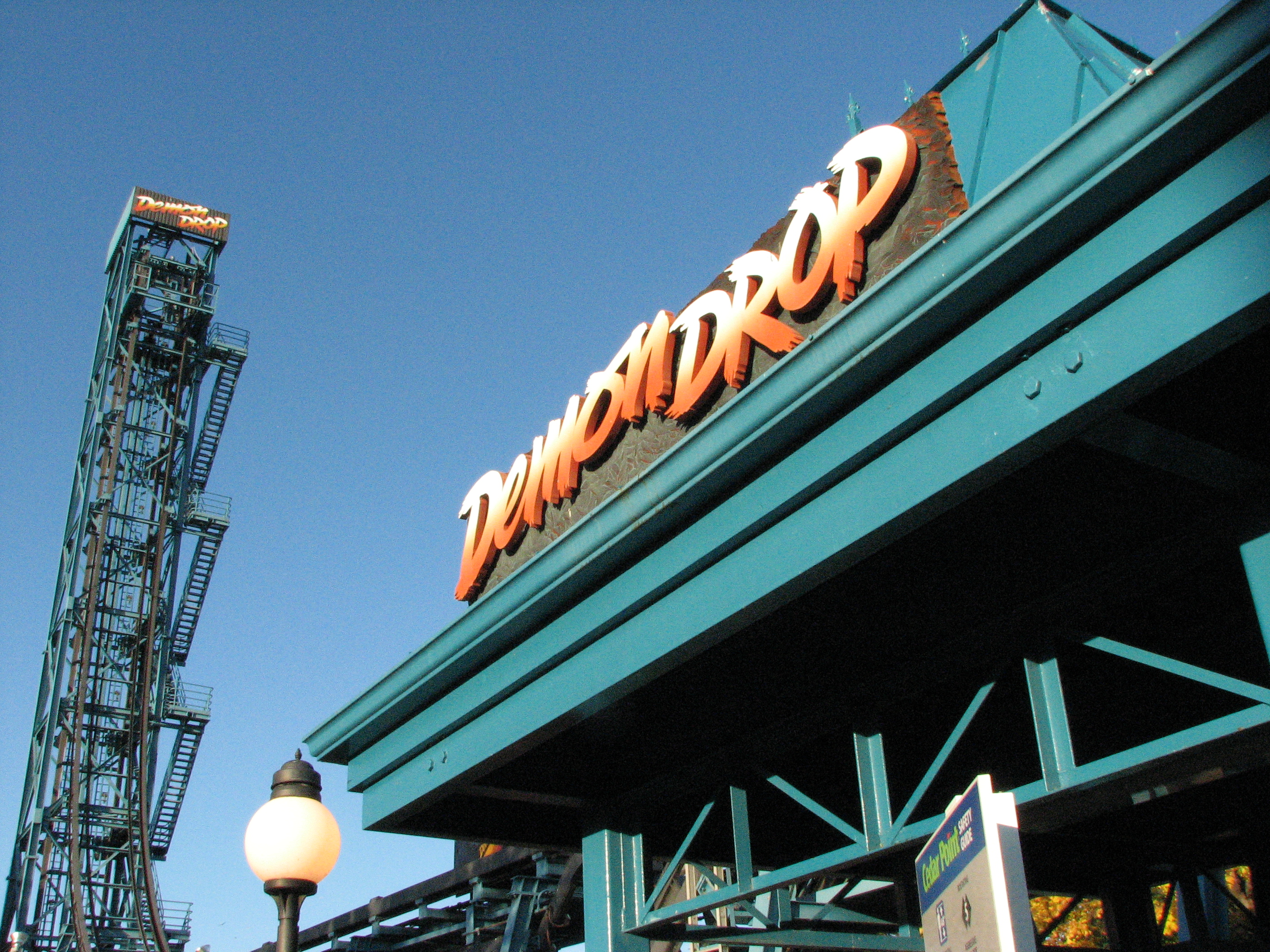
Demon Drop

Demon Drop debuted at Cedar Point in 1983.

On May 22, 1984, Demon Drop was shut down out of precaution when an incident occurred on a similar ride called The Edge at Six Flags Great America. Demon Drop reopened two days later.

On October 21, 2009, Cedar Point officials announced that Demon Drop would be relocated to Knott's Berry Farm for the 2010 season. In November of that year, ride pieces similar to Demon Drop were spotted at Dorney Park. On December 2, 2009, it was announced that Demon Drop would not be relocated to Knott's Berry Farm. Instead, it would be relocated to Dorney Park. It officially opened at Dorney Park on July 8, 2010.

== Ride description ==
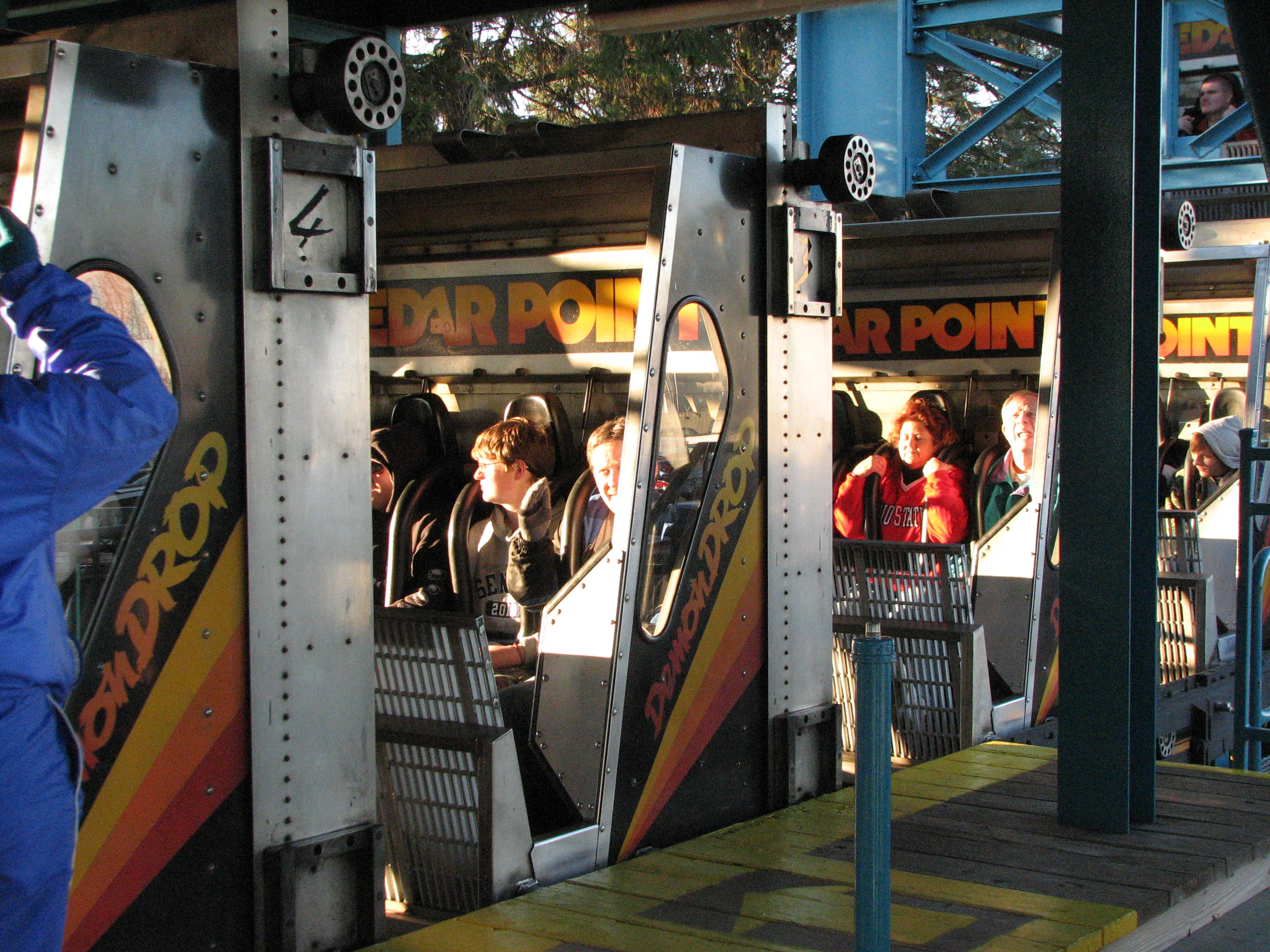
Demon Drop cars being loaded

The ride can accommodate up to four riders, and consists of three main sections: the boarding station, the lift tower, and the brake run. Riders are loaded into a gondola near ground level at the station and secured with an over the shoulder harness. The gondola then moves backwards horizontally to the rear base of the lift tower and climbs vertically to the top of the tower. After reaching the top, it slides forward and hangs over the drop track for a few moments until the car is suddenly released, dropping riders 60 feet (18 m). Riders experience g-forces from deceleration as the car enters a pull-out curve which transitions the vertical fall into a horizontal brake run. Riders face upward toward the sky as the gondola rolls through the brake run. After stopping, a mechanism swings the top of the car down, and the gondola moves in reverse at down a 45-degree angle to another track, where it returns to an upright position and returns to the station.

== See also ==
- Power Tower, an S&S Worldwide drop tower ride at Cedar Point
- Dominator, an S&S Worldwide drop ride at Dorney Park & Wildwater Kingdom
