= Iron Menace =

Roller coaster in Pennsylvania

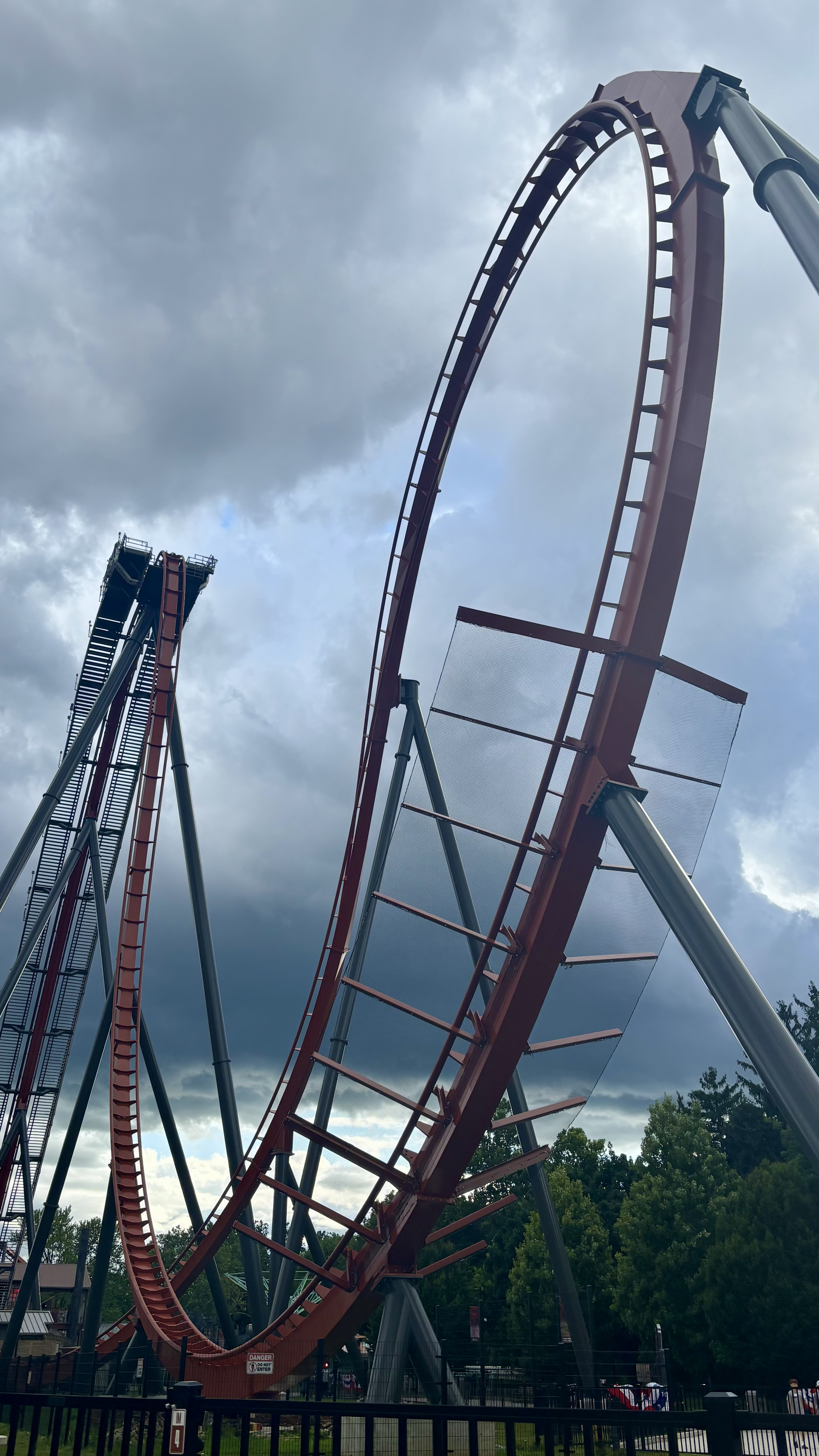
- The ride's first drop in 2026

Dorney Park & Wildwater Kingdom
- Location: Dorney Park & Wildwater Kingdom
- Park section: Steel Yard
- Coordinates: 40.5772°N 75.5373°W
- Status: Operating
- Soft opening date: April 17, 2024
- Opening date: May 10, 2024
- Replaced: Stinger

General statistics
- Type: Steel – Dive Coaster
- Manufacturer: Bolliger & Mabillard
- Model: Dive Coaster
- Lift/launch system: Chain lift hill
- Height: 160 ft (49 m)
- Drop: 152 ft (46 m)
- Length: 2,169 ft (661 m)
- Speed: 64 mph (103 km/h)
- Inversions: 4
- Duration: 1:30
- Max vertical angle: 95°
- Height restriction: 48–78 in (122–198 cm)
- Trains: 2 trains with 3 cars; riders arranged 7 across in a single row for a total of 21 riders per train
- Fast Lane available
- Iron Menace at RCDB

Iron Menace is a steel roller coaster located at Dorney Park & Wildwater Kingdom in Dorneyville, Pennsylvania. Manufactured by Bolliger & Mabillard, the Dive Coaster model opened on May 10, 2024. The ride is themed to an old steel mill that closed in the early 1900s following the mysterious disappearance of its owner. Iron Menace reaches a height of 160 feet (49 m), a maximum speed of 64 mph (103 km/h), and features four inversions.

== History ==
In February 2023, the South Whitehall Township Planning Commission approved a project submitted by Dorney Park & Wildwater Kingdom to build a new steel roller coaster on the site formerly occupied by Stinger, a coaster that was removed in 2018. Details were kept hidden from the public with the exception of the ride's maximum height, which was revealed to be 161.67 feet (49.28 m). The name of the new coaster, Iron Menace, was unveiled alongside its backstory on August 10, 2023. The new ride was described as "one of the largest capital investments in park history". The park frequently posted construction updates and marketed the ride as the first dive coaster in the Northeast, although Sarah Cassi of The Express-Times noted a larger dive coaster at Busch Gardens Williamsburg in Virginia called Griffon.

A soft opening media preview event was held on April 17, 2024, and season pass holders were given the opportunity to ride Iron Menace during one of several preseason preview weekends in advance of its official opening to the public on May 10, 2024.

== Ride characteristics ==
Iron Menace features two trains, each with three single-row cars that seat seven riders per row for a total of 21 riders per train. The ride reaches a maximum height of 160 feet (49 m) with a first drop of 152 feet (46 m) at a 95-degree angle. Its maximum speed is 64 mph (103 km/h), and there are four inversions throughout the 2,169-foot (661 m) track layout – an Immelmann loop, a zero-g roll, an inclined loop, and a corkscrew. One cycle of the ride lasts approximately 1 minute and 30 seconds.

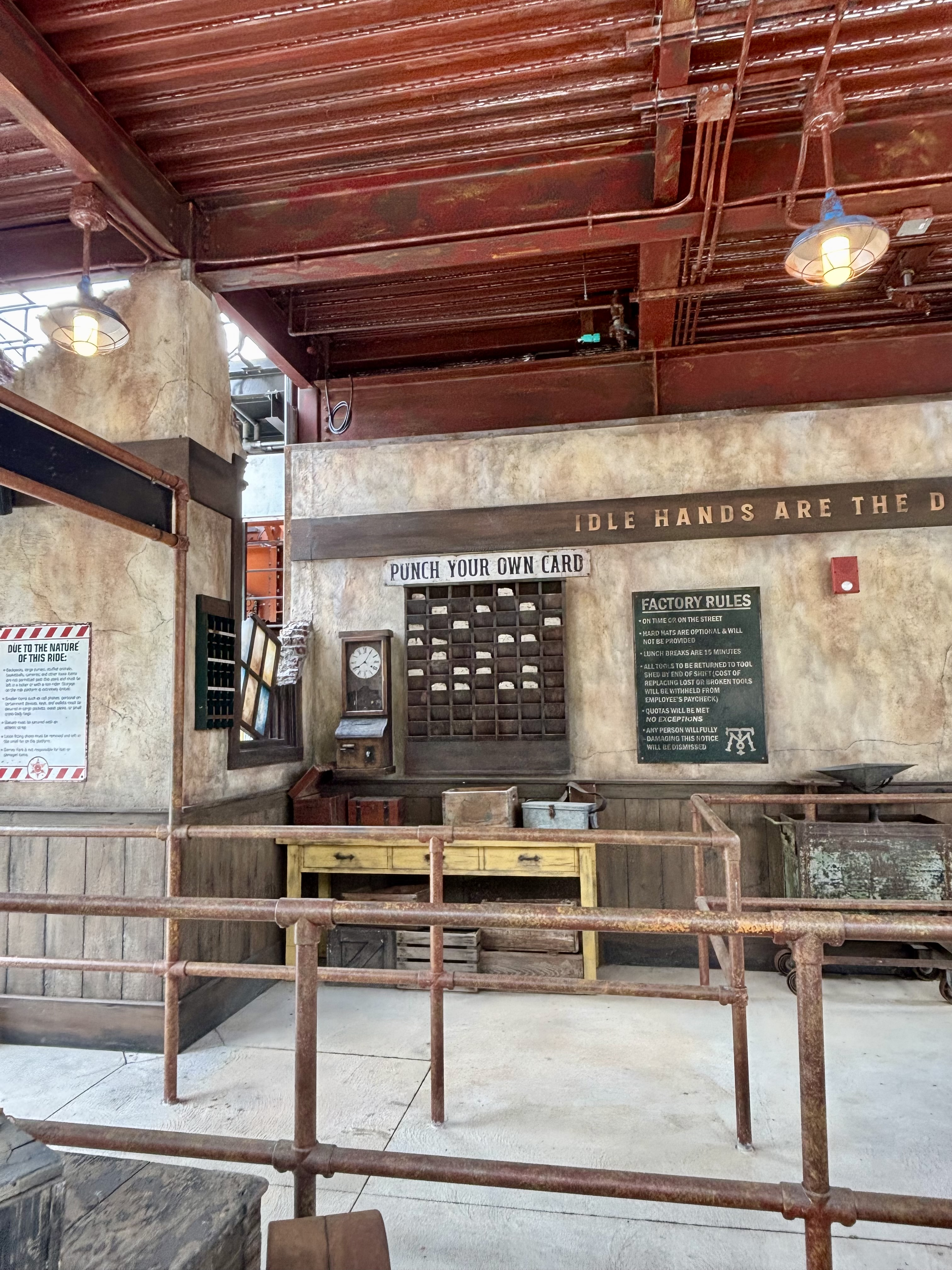
The queue of Iron Menace
