= Dominator (ride) =

Thrill ride

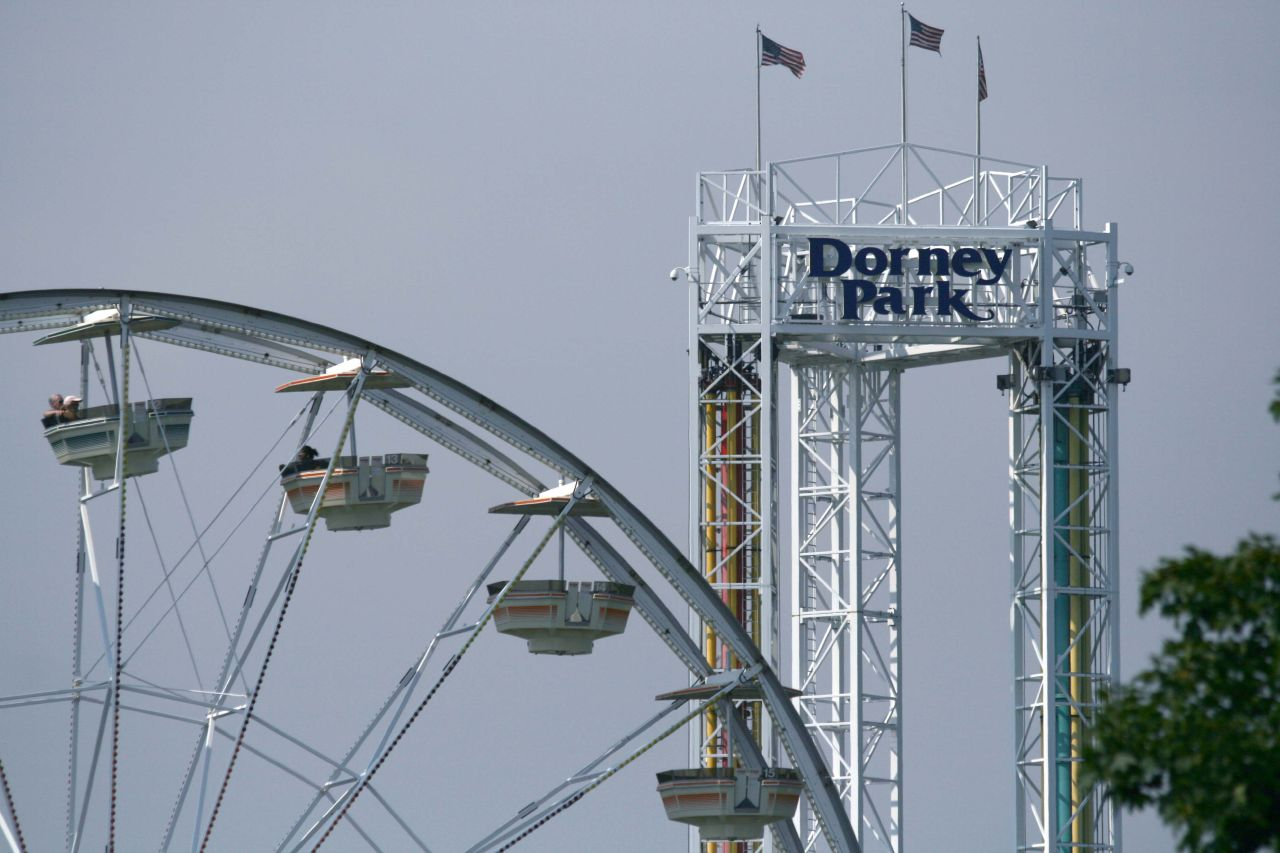
- View of Dominator and the Ferris wheel in the foreground

Dorney Park & Wildwater Kingdom
- Status: Operating
- Opening date: May 8, 1999

Ride statistics
- Manufacturer: S&S Power
- Model: Turbo Drop, Space Shot
- Height: 200 ft (61 m)
- Drop: 160 ft (49 m)
- Speed: 40 mph (64 km/h)
- Capacity: 900 riders per hour
- Vehicles: 2
- Riders per vehicle: 12
- Rows: 1
- Duration: 30-40 seconds
- Height restriction: 48 in (122 cm)
- Launch System: Pneumatic
- Fast Lane available

Dominator is a thrill ride located at Dorney Park & Wildwater Kingdom in Allentown, Pennsylvania. It was manufactured by S&S Power and opened on May 8, 1999.

== The ride ==
Dominator is a 200-foot tall, three-tower structure. One of the towers features a Space Shot ride, where 12 riders are blasted upwards to a height of 160 feet at speeds of up to 50 mph. The second tower is a Turbo Drop ride, where 12 riders are lifted up 175 feet then released downwards at speeds of up to 40 mph. Both rides use compressed air to power the attraction.

A total of twelve passengers may ride either of the attractions at one time. Riders sit in outward-facing, open-air seats with their backs to the towers and their legs left dangling.

== See also ==
- Power Tower, a similar ride at Cedar Point and Valleyfair.
- Demon Drop, another drop ride at Dorney Park.
