= Dorney Park & Wildwater Kingdom =

Amusement park in Dorneyville, Pennsylvania

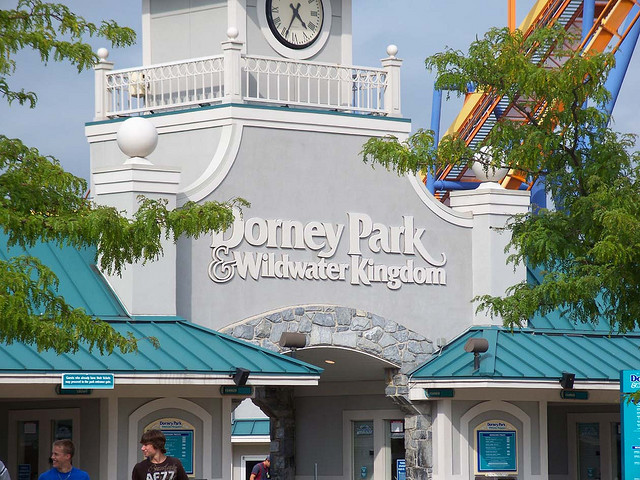
- Entrance to Dorney Park & Wildwater Kingdom in August 2007
- Interactive map of Dorney Park & Wildwater Kingdom
- Location: Dorneyville, Pennsylvania, U.S.
- Coordinates: 40°34′40.59″N 75°31′53.50″W
- Status: Operating
- Opened: 1884; 141 years ago
- Owner: Six Flags
- General manager: Jessica Naderman
- Slogan: "Lehigh Valley's premier destination for FUN!"
- Operating season: May through early November
- Area: 200 acres (0.81 km^{2})

Attractions
- Total: 44
- Roller coasters: 8
- Water rides: 3
- Website: sixflags.com/dorneypark

Dorney Park & Wildwater Kingdom is an amusement and water park located in Dorneyville, Pennsylvania, outside Allentown, in the United States. Owned and operated by Six Flags, the park features 64 rides, including eight roller coasters, several thrill rides and children's rides, and a water park, Wildwater Kingdom, with 26 water slides.

Dorney Park features some of the world's most prominent roller coasters, including Steel Force, the ninth-longest steel roller coaster in the world and the second-longest on the U.S. East Coast. Dorney Park is one of only fourteen trolley parks still operating in the United States.

Founded in 1884, Dorney Park & Wildwater Kingdom is the fifth-oldest amusement park in continuous operation in the nation.

== History ==
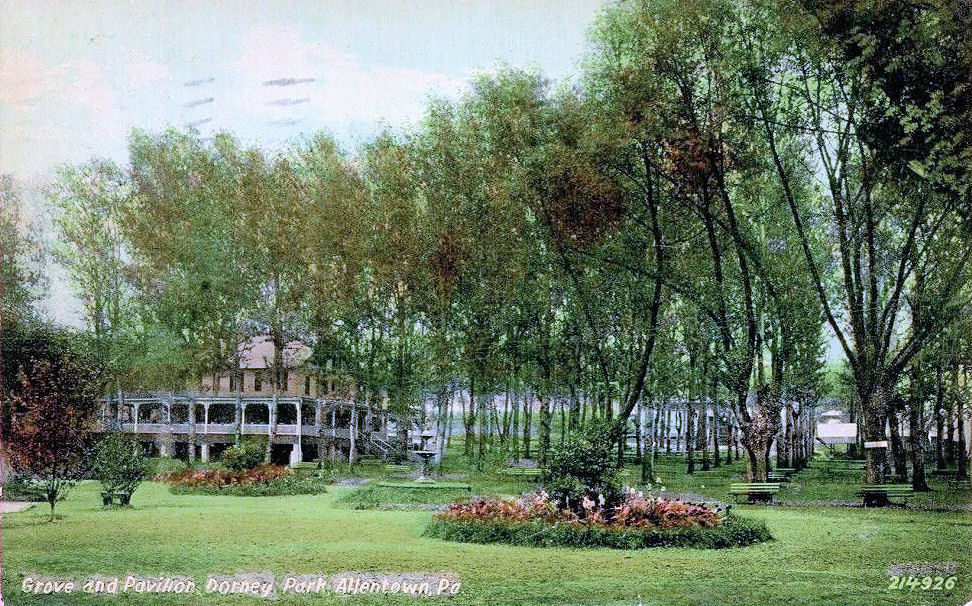
A 1910 postcard photograph of Dorney Park's picnic grove and pavilion

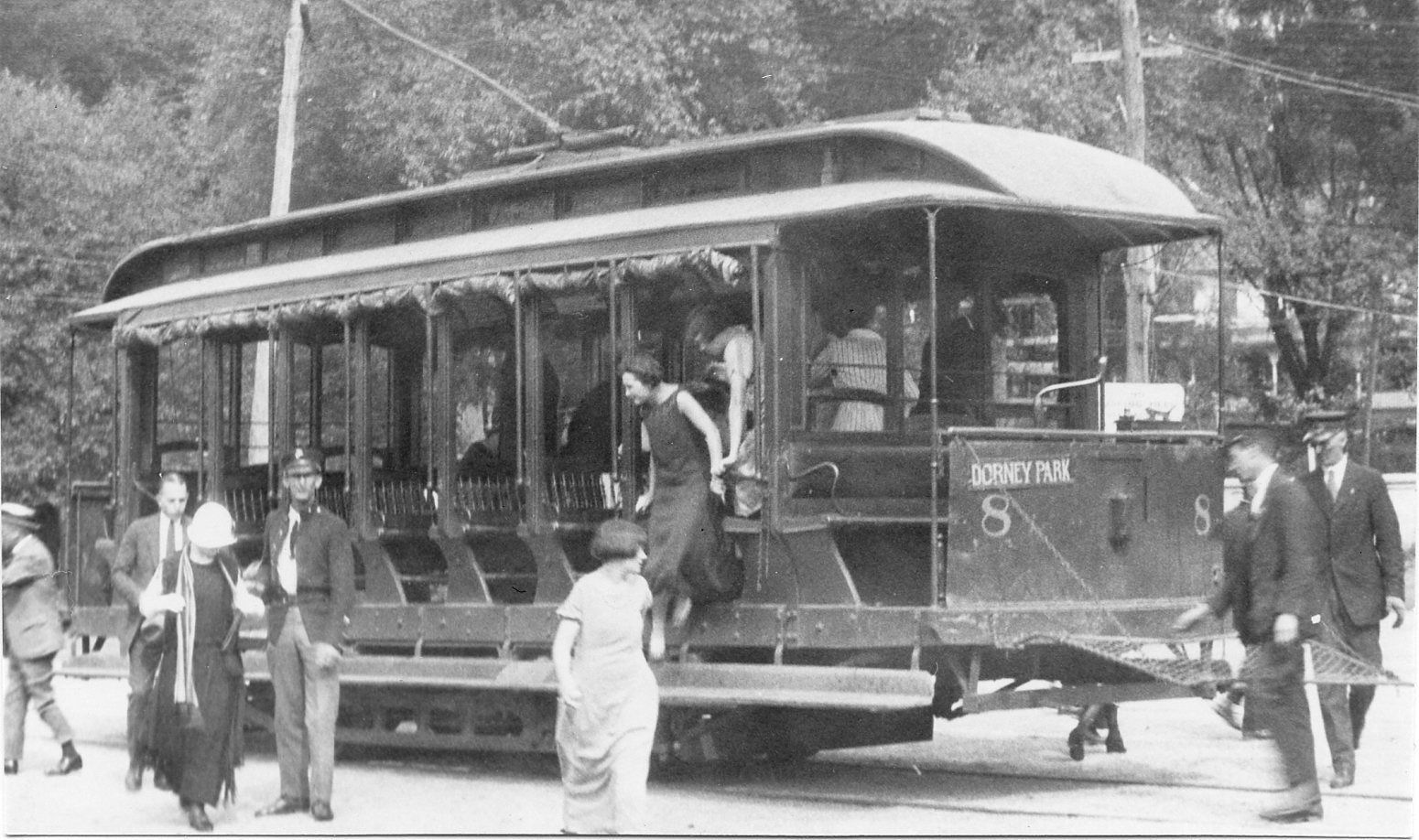
The Allentown-Kutztown trolley at Dorney Park in 1922

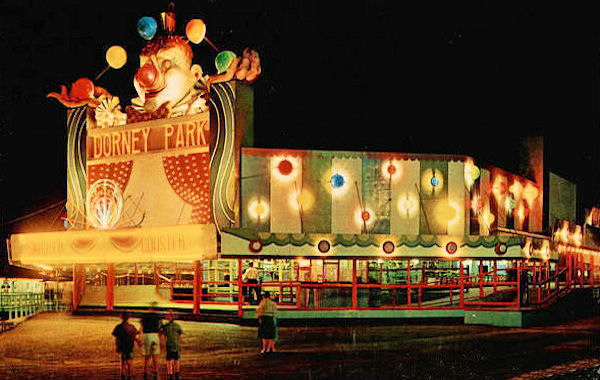
Main entrance to Dorney Park in 1950

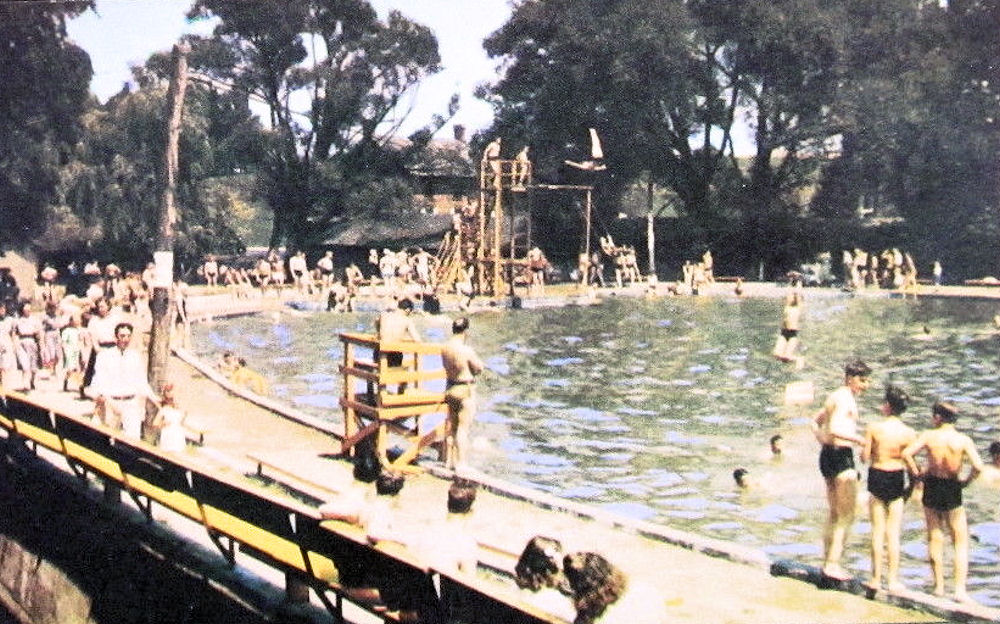
Dorney Park's swimming pool in 1950

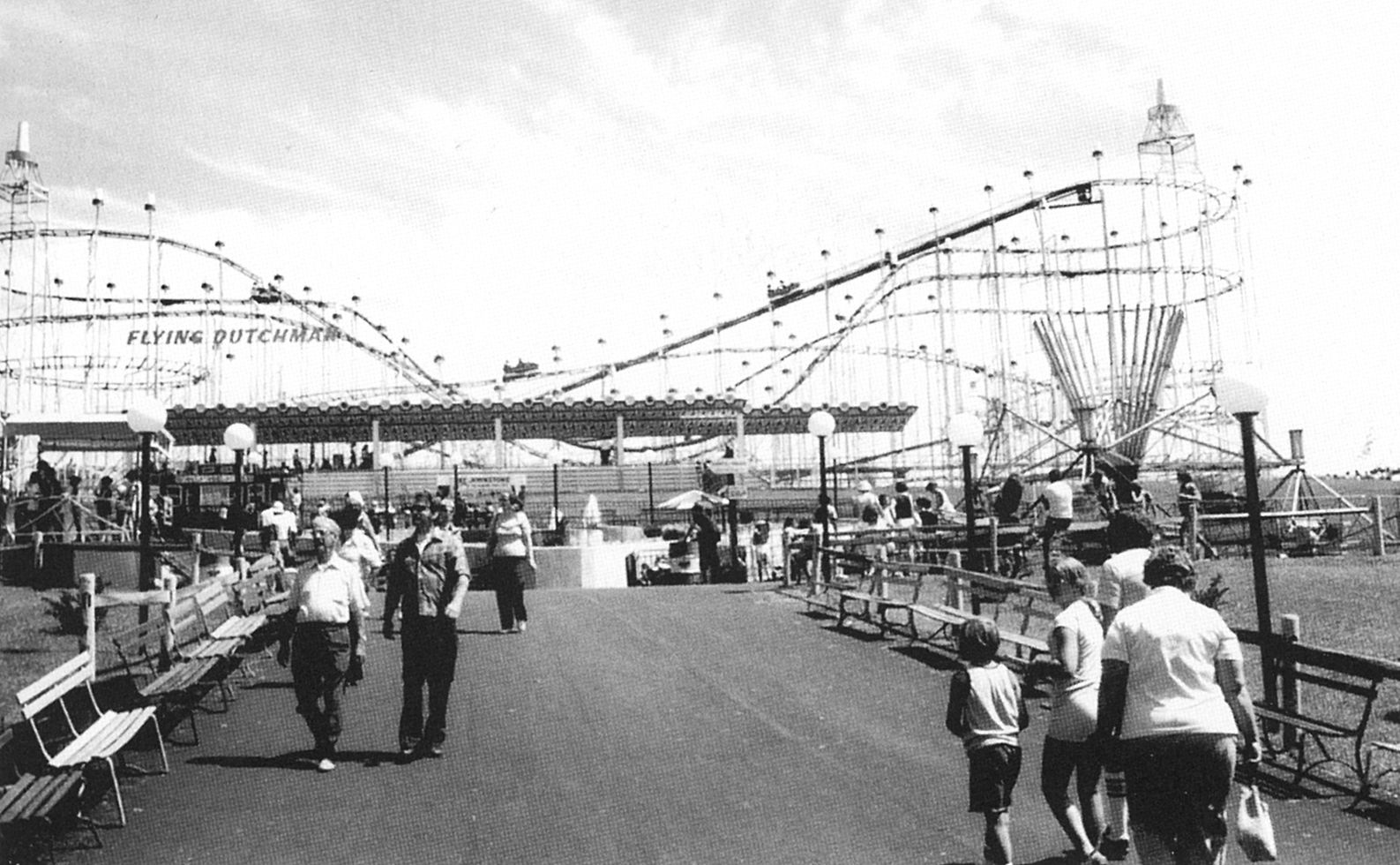
Dorney Park's Flying Dutchman roller coaster in 1972

=== 19th century ===
Dorney Park traces its history to 1860, when Solomon Dorney built a trout hatchery and summer resort on his estate outside of Allentown. In 1870, Dorney decided to convert the estate into a public attraction. The facility initially featured games, playground-style rides, refreshment stands, picnic groves, a hotel, and a restaurant. By the 1880s, Dorney had added a small zoo and garden. The Allentown-Kutztown Traction Company completed its trolley line from Allentown to Kutztown in 1899, and the company added a stop at Dorney's park. Two years later, in 1901, the traction company purchased the park.

=== 20th century ===
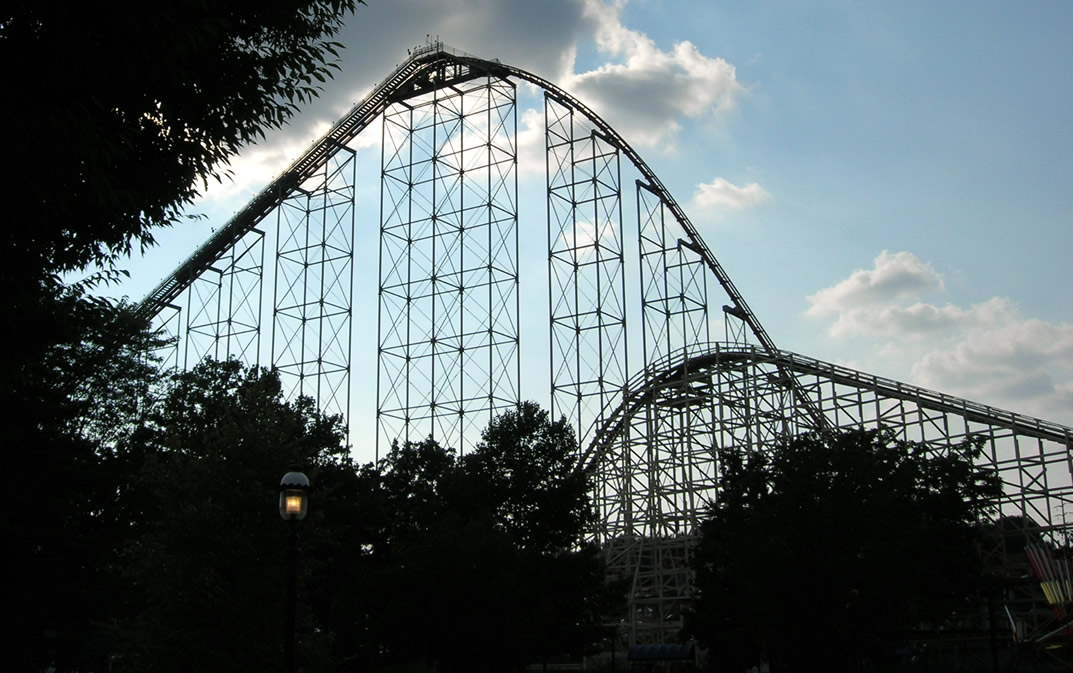
The first drops of the Steel Force and Thunderhawk roller coasters at Dorney Park

The Allentown-Kutztown Traction Company operated the park until 1923, when it was sold to Robert Plarr and two other partners. Plarr soon bought out his partners and ran Dorney Park independently until his death in 1966. Ownership then passed to Plarr's son, Stephen, who died within a year. Robert Ott, Plarr's son-in-law, took over as owner in 1967. In 1985, Ott sold Dorney Park to Harris Weinstein. Weinstein owned it until 1992, when he sold the park to Cedar Fair.

In 1932, the Philadelphia Toboggan Coasters (PTC) Grande Carousel debuted at Dorney Park. The Whip opened in 1918, and is still in operation today and is the park's oldest ride. Dorney Park also had a swimming pool from the early 1900s until 1963. The park's first roller coaster opened in 1923. It was originally known as "The Coaster" or "the yellow roller coaster" until 1989, when it was renamed Thunderhawk. It still operates today.

Near the lower entrance to the park was the Tunnel of Love, which later was rethemed as The Journey to the Center of the Earth. The ride was a Bill Tracy mill chute. It was razed following the 1992 season, after Cedar Fair acquired the park.

In the mid-1940s, PTC built a Cuddle-Up ride at the park, which was later enclosed and heavily air-conditioned in the late 1970s when it was rethemed as The Iceberg, featuring strobe lights and loud music. It was removed after the 1993 season. The Gold Mine was a dark walk-through located near The Iceberg until the former's closure in 1980. The Flying Dutchman was a Pinfari compact steel coaster located where the Ferris wheel is currently located. It was the largest of its kind, and was removed following the 1988 season due to mechanical problems.

In 1980, Dorney Park Road, a former two-lane state highway which cut through the park, was closed to traffic and converted to a midway. Dorney Park Road became a local street and the access road to the park. Prior to the road's closing, Dorney Park's narrow-gauge railroad crossed the road, which caused traffic stoppages every time the train crossed.

The road closing led to the enclosure of the park by fence and the introduction of a single-price admission fee, which eliminated individual ride tickets and free entrance to the park. The park previously maintained groves for family picnics. While the groves remained outside the park's fences, patrons were no longer allowed to bring outside food into the park.

In 1982, the park opened its log flume ride, Thunder Creek Mountain, which holds the record for the longest drop on a log flume ride at 210 feet.

In the fall of 1983, a major fire destroyed a large section of the park, including the Carousel, Bucket O' Blood dark ride, Flying Bobs, and several food stands. These rides were later replaced in 1984 for the 100th anniversary with the addition of Enterprise, Musik Express, Ranger, and Apollo. New skee-ball alleys, gift shops, and food stands were added.

In 1985, Dorney Park was sold to Harris Weinstein, who also bought a neighboring automobile racetrack, which was razed and replaced by a water park named Wildwater Kingdom. Its admission fee was separate from the amusement park, and its attractions included a wave pool, a family water raft ride, body slides, tube slides, and a children's water play area. Season passes were also introduced in the same year.

In 1986, a looping roller coaster designed by Anton Schwarzkopf called Laser, featuring two loops, was added to the park's lineup. It was originally designed as a portable ride for fairs, but Dorney Park used it as a permanent attraction. The coaster was named after a local Hot AC radio station known as Laser 104.1 at the time. In 1988, a kiddie coaster was added across from Laser and named Little Laser. Following Laser's removal in 2008, Little Laser was renamed Steel First, after Steel Force.

In 1989, the park further grew with debut of Hercules, a wooden terrain coaster, which was built on the top of the hill lining what was then the back of the park, near what was Wildwater Kingdom's parking lot. This coaster was the tallest wooden roller coaster in the world until Cedar Point's Mean Streak debuted in 1991. Hercules proved a big hit for Dorney Park in its first four seasons, but became known for its rough, often jarringly shaky ride, due in large part to significant modifications made to Hercules after the park was purchased by Cedar Fair in 1992. Hercules was removed in 2003 due to high maintenance costs and low ridership. A steel coaster, Hydra the Revenge, is located where Hercules once stood.

In 1992, Cedar Fair purchased the park for $48M.

In 1993, a new midway began construction, intending to connect Wildwater Kingdom directly to Dorney Park. Also in 1993, the park built White Water Landing, a shoot-the-chutes style ride that featured 20-passenger boats cascading down an 80-foot (24 m) drop.

In 1994, the midway was completed on the top of the hill near Hercules and White Water Landing. Several concession stands and a carousel were added to this new midway. The parking lot for Wildwater Kingdom was doubled in size and converted to serve both Dorney Park and Wildwater Kingdom. A new entrance was also built to Dorney Park. Dorney Park and Wildwater Kingdom were still separately gated until the end of the season.

In 1995, admission to both Dorney Park and Wildwater Kingdom was offered at a single price for the first time. That year also saw the addition of Thunder Canyon, a river rapids ride consisting of eight-passenger rafts that plunge and rock along a 16,400-foot (5,000 m) path through a canyon, propelled by approximately 1 million US gallons (3,800 m^{3}) of water.

In 1996, construction began on a steel hypercoaster known as Steel Force. It was designed by D.H. Morgan, a former employee of Arrow Dynamics. Morgan previously was involved with designing Magnum XL-200 at Cedar Point in 1988. Steel Force follows a similar out-and-back layout, but features a smoother braking system. It opened in 1997 as "the tallest and longest roller coaster on the east coast." Several new attractions were added to Wildwater Kingdom, including several waterslides and a second lazy river.

In 1998, Dorney Park added a top spin ride called Hang Time. At the end of the season, the Monster ride was relocated within the park. This was also the last year for the Sky Ride, which was removed at the end of the season. During the off-season, Laser was repainted.

In 1999, a 200-foot (61 m) combined turbo drop and space shot tower called Dominator was added. One tower blasts riders straight up 15 stories before dropping them back down, while another tower slowly lifts riders to 170 feet (52 m) before dropping them.

=== 21st century ===
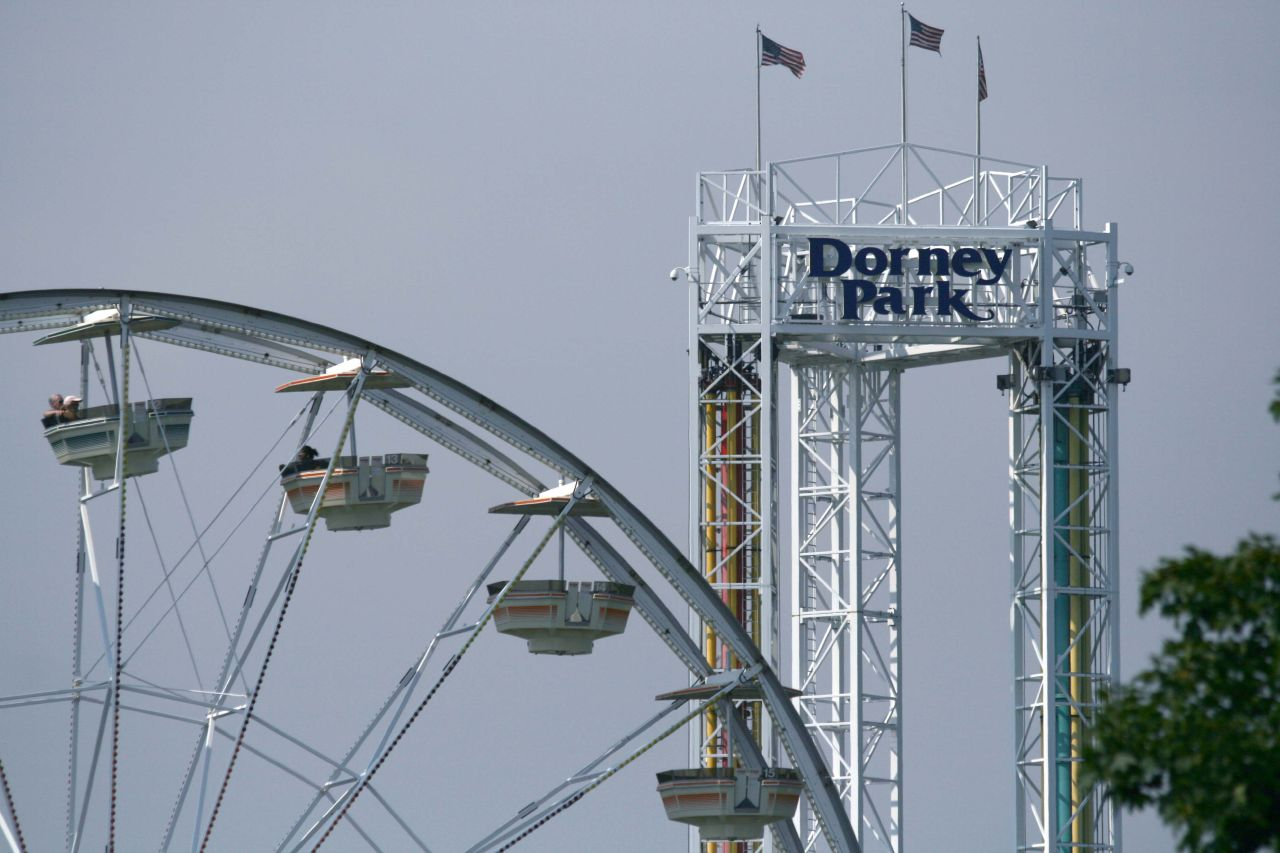
Dominator at Dorney Park & Wildwater Kingdom in September 2007

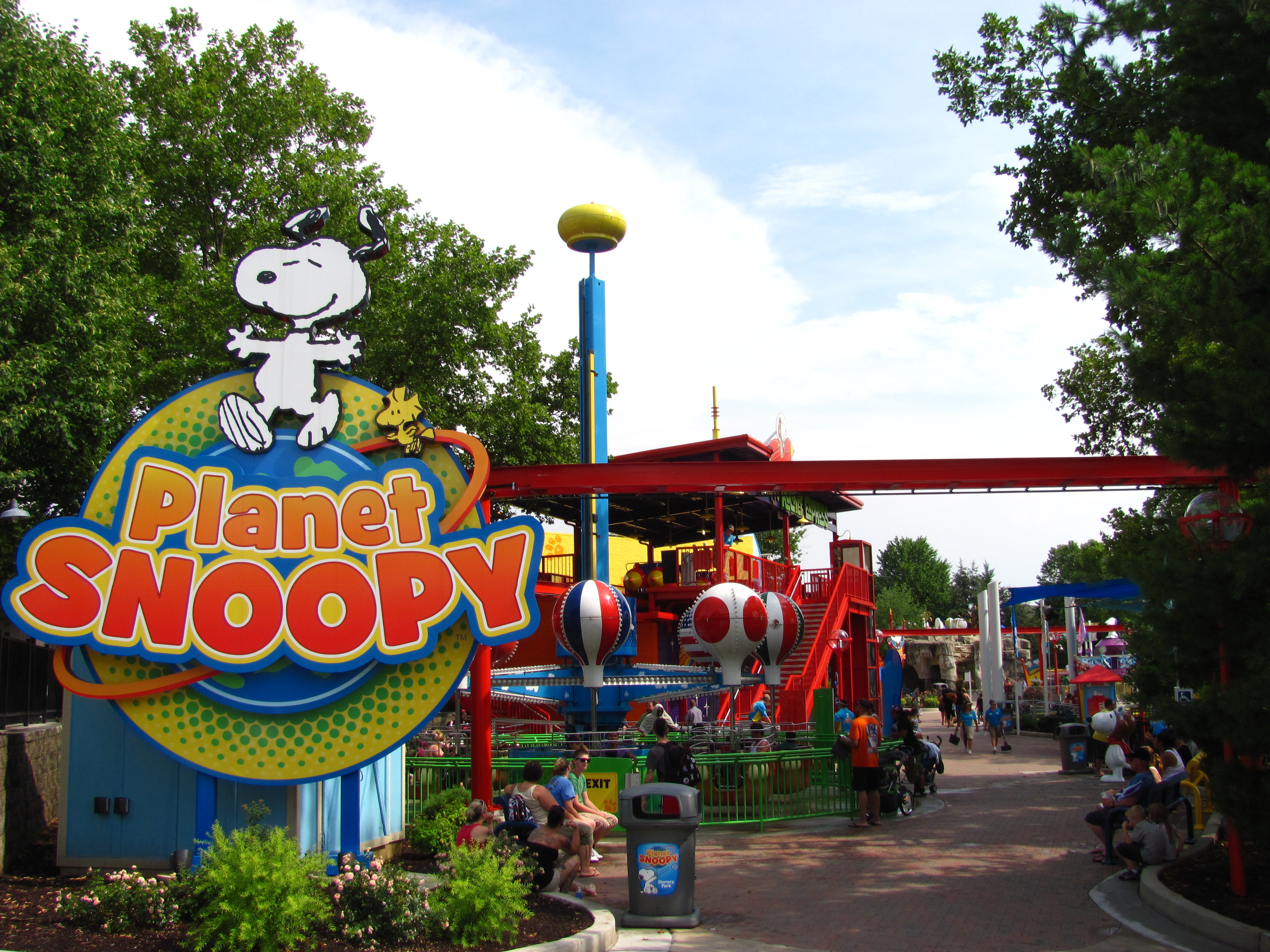
Planet Snoopy at Dorney Park & Wildwater Kingdom in July 2012

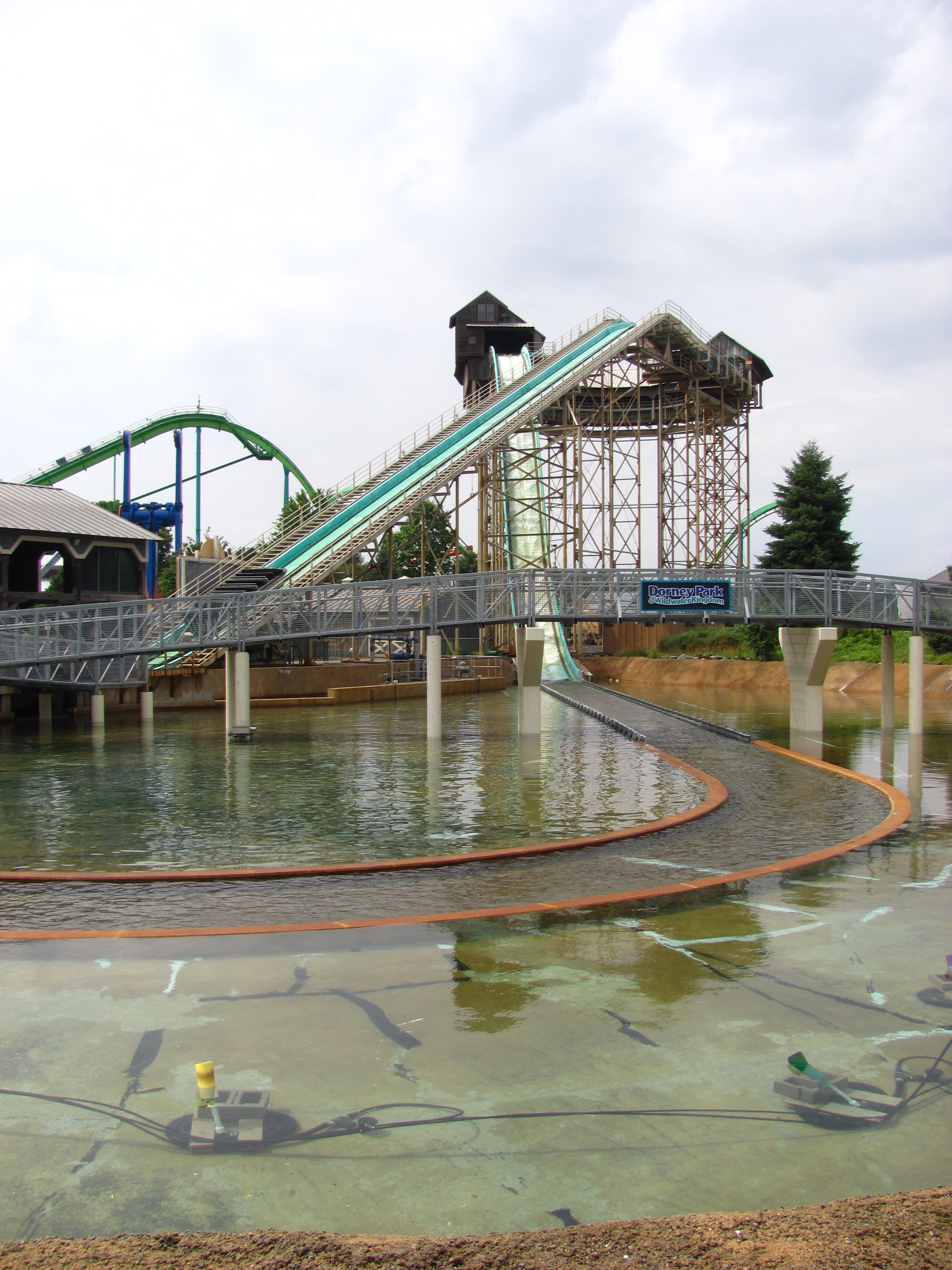
White Water Landing at Dorney Park & Wildwater Kingdom in July 2012

In 2000, Dorney Park debuted Camp Snoopy, a themed children's play area. A junior coaster called Woodstock Express was added that year, bringing the park's coaster count to eight. A Wild Mouse coaster was also added this year. Additionally, a new upcharge attraction, Skyscraper, a Booster thrill ride by Gravity Works, Inc., was installed.

In 2001, a coaster designed by Bolliger & Mabillard (B&M) called Talon was added near the front entrance of park. The ride is a steel inverted looping coaster. In 2002, the park added Meteor, a flat ride built by Zamperla.

In 2003, Wildwater Kingdom was overhauled. Several older body slides were removed and replaced with four modern colored body slides, two of which were open and two of which were enclosed tube slides. Three inflated tube slides were also added. A new children's water play area was also added. In July, the park announced that Hercules would close after the end of the season, and be replaced in 2005 by Hydra the Revenge, a $13 million steel floorless B&M coaster.

In 2004, construction on Hydra the Revenge began soon after the razing of Hercules. Around the same time, Skyscraper was relocated to Valleyfair, and operated there for two years before again being relocated to Cedar Point.

On May 7, 2005, Hydra the Revenge, a coaster half a mile in length and featuring a 105-foot (32 m) drop, opened. It is the first and only floorless roller coaster in Pennsylvania.

On September 22, 2007, Dorney Park announced it would be opening a twisted impulse coaster from Intamin. The coaster, previously located at Geauga Lake in Aurora, Ohio, debuted in 2000 as Superman: Ultimate Escape, and was renamed Steel Venom when the park was purchased by Cedar Fair in 2004. Steel Venom was removed from Geauga Lake in 2006 and opened as Voodoo at Dorney Park on May 17, 2008. The ride was renamed Possessed after the 2008 season to resolve a conflict with Six Flags, which held the rights to the name Voodoo.

In 2008, Dorney Park announced that Laser would be removed after end of the season. It now operates in Germany as Teststrecke, where it travels to various German fairs. In 2009, Dorney Park added the Good Time Theatre. This theatre was announced in February 2009 and broke ground in April 2009.

In 2010, the park removed its bumper car ride to make room for the Demon Drop freefall ride from Cedar Point. Additionally, the park announced that Planet Snoopy would open for the 2011 season.

In 2011, Dorney Park completed an $8M overhaul to the former Camp Snoopy children's area. The new area was named Planet Snoopy, and included seven new rides and an amphitheater.

In 2012, Dorney Park added Stinger, a Vekoma inverted shuttle coaster formerly located at California's Great America as Invertigo. The park also added the new Fast Lane virtual queue system, and the Dinosaurs Alive! walkthrough attraction that guests paid an additional fee to access. Dinosaurs Alive! featured life-sized animatronic dinosaurs that moved and produced sound effects.

In 2013, Dorney Park introduced a new Fast Pay wristband, allowing guests to add money to an RFID prepaid wristband, allowing them to pay for food and merchandise without carrying cash.

On August 28, 2013, Dorney Park announced a new 65-foot-tall (20 m) waterslide complex known as Snake Pit would be opened for the 2014 season. Snake Pit features six water slides.

Also new for 2014 was an in-park television channel called FUNtv. FUNtv is shown on television screens in the queue lines of many of the park's major attractions.

On November 17, 2014, Dorney Park announced a new attraction for 2015, Cedar Creek Flyers, manufactured by Larson International, Inc. In 2015, Hang Time was removed, and in 2016, Screamin' Swing was removed.

In 2017, Dorney Park reopened their Dodg'ems ride, as well as adding Kaleidoscope, a HUSS troika. This season would be the final operating season for Stinger.

In 2018, Dorney Park removed Stinger. Additionally, they retracked 150 feet on Thunderhawk. Both the amusement park and waterpark received various new concessions areas. In August, the park announced that Dinosaurs Alive! would close after the 2018 season.

The 2019 season held two large events: Grand Carnivale, a large international-themed festival which ran at the beginning of the season, and Monster Jam: Thunder Alley, a truck-themed event which ran in the fall. Halloween Haunt also ran in the fall.

On March 11, 2020, the park announced that it would open normally for the season, expecting the COVID-19 pandemic to be resolved by the summer. The park later announced on March 20, 2020, that it would not open as scheduled for the 2020 season, but would open later in the season.

On June 26, 2020, the park announced that it would be reopening with new safety protocols due to the COVID-19 pandemic. Dorney Park reopened to season pass holders on July 8, 2020, and to all guests on July 11, 2020. It was also announced that Wildwater Kingdom would not open with the park. New safety procedures included pre-arrival health screenings, temperature checks, social distancing, limited ride capacity, and mandatory masks. The opening of Seaside Splashworks was pushed back until 2021. Additionally, Halloween Haunt did not occur in 2020.

On March 12, 2021, the park announced another delayed opening for the 2021 season. Dorney Park opened on May 22, and Wildwater Kingdom opened a week later. Seaside Splashworks officially opened Memorial Day weekend. It was also announced that daily operations would begin on June 16. The park was closed on Mondays and Tuesdays throughout the duration of the summer due to staffing issues. Grand Carnivale returned in July. In July 2021, the park announced that Halloween Haunt and The Great Pumpkin Fest would return in fall 2021.

In 2022, The Whip underwent renovations. Daily operation returned for the first time since the 2019 season.

In 2023, general park upgrades and changes to the park's live entertainment and food and beverage options. Dorney Park saw the addition of a stage on the main midway, and several upgrades to Wildwater Kingdom. Dorney Park announced on July 21, 2023, that a new B&M steel dive coaster called Iron Menace would open the next year. The ride features four inversions, with a drop of 152 feet (46 m) and a track length of 2,169 feet (661 m). Iron Menace opened in May 2024.

On July 1, 2024, a merger of equals between Dorney Park owner Cedar Fair and Six Flags was completed, creating Six Flags Entertainment Corporation.

In February 2025, as the Philadelphia Eagles prepared to play in Super Bowl LIX, Dorney Park flew the team's flag from its most iconic rides and lit up much of the park in green, the team's color.

== Attractions ==
Dorney Park first added a Dentzel Carousel in 1901, and has since grown to include 44 rides as of the 2023 season.

=== Roller coasters ===
Intensity rating (out of 5)
1 (low) 2 (mild) 3 (moderate) 4 (high) 5 (aggressive)

Name	Picture	Opened	Manufacturer	Description	Thrill level
Hydra the Revenge		2005	Bolliger & Mabillard	A steel floorless roller coaster. It is notable for having an inversion before the lift hill.	5
Iron Menace		2024	Bolliger & Mabillard	A steel Dive Coaster with a 152-foot drop and four inversions	5
Possessed		2008	Intamin	A steel launched inverted roller coaster (Impulse). It was previously located at Geauga Lake as Steel Venom and Superman: Ultimate Escape.	5
Steel Force		1997	D. H. Morgan Manufacturing	A steel hyper roller coaster. It is over a mile long, making it the eighth-longest steel roller coaster in the world.	5
Talon		2001	Bolliger & Mabillard	A steel inverted roller coaster with four inversions	5
Thunderhawk		1924	Philadelphia Toboggan Coasters	A wooden roller coaster. One of the oldest operating roller coasters in the world.	4
Wild Mouse		2000	Maurer AG	A steel wild mouse roller coaster	4
Woodstock Express		2000	Zamperla	A steel children's roller coaster	2

=== Thrill rides ===
Name	Opened	Manufacturer	Description	Thrill level
Demon Drop	2010	Intamin	A first-generation Freefall ride. It was previously located at Cedar Point.	5
Dominator	1999	S&S Worldwide	A combination Turbo Drop and Space Shot tower	5
Enterprise	1984	HUSS Park Attractions	An Enterprise ride	4
Revolution	2004	Chance Morgan	A Revolution ride	5

=== Family rides ===
Name	Opened	Manufacturer	Description	Thrill level
Antique Carousel	1995	Dentzel Carousel Company	A 1921 Dentzel carousel featuring a 66 piece menagerie of animals and two chariots. It opened at Cedar Point in 1972 and was relocated to Dorney Park in 1995. A Wurlitzer style #153 Military Band Organ provides the carousel's music.	1
Cedar Creek Cannonball	1993	Crown Metal Products	A 2 ft 6 in (762 mm) narrow gauge replica steam engine train ride	1
Dodgem	2017	Soli	Bumper cars	4
Ferris Wheel	1991	Chance Rides	A classic Ferris wheel ride	2
Kaleidoscope	2017	HUSS Park Attractions	A troika featuring three arms of seven gondolas moving counterclockwise against the ride's main clockwise direction	3
MT Buckets	2015	Larson International	A Flying Scooters ride with eight carriages that each have a paddle, enabling guests to change the movement of their carriage. Formerly called Cedar Creek Flyers from 2015 to 2023.	3
Musik Express	1984	Mack Rides	A Music Express ride	3
Road Rally	1994	D. H. Morgan Manufacturing	A car ride with gasoline-powered vehicles that are modeled after classic sports cars	2
Scrambler	1970	Eli Bridge Company	A Twist ride	3
Sea Dragon	1984	Chance Rides	A swinging ship ride	3
Tilt-A-Whirl	2002	Sellner Manufacturing	A Tilt-A-Whirl ride	3
Wave Swinger	1985	Zierer	A swing ride	3
The Whip	1920	W.F. Mangels	Riders travel in carts through an oval that whips them around 180-degree turns. The Whip is the oldest ride in the park.	2
Zephyr Railroad	1935	Unknown	A gas/electric train that takes riders on a scenic trip around the park	1

=== Water rides ===
Name	Opened	Manufacturer	Description	Thrill level
Thunder Canyon	1994	Barr Engineering	A river rapids ride	4
Thunder Creek Mountain	1982	Barr Engineering	A log flume ride	4
White Water Landing	1993	Arrow Dynamics	A shoot the chutes ride	5

=== Kids' rides ===
Name	Opened	Manufacturer	Type	Thrill level
Camp Bus	2000	Zamperla	Miniature Ali Baba	2
Charlie Brown's Wind-Up	2000	Zamperla	Miniature swing ride	2
Flying Ace	2000	Zamperla	Miniature swinging ship	2
Flying Ace Balloon Race	2011	Zamperla	Balloon Race	2
Kite Eating Tree	2000	Zamperla	Miniature drop tower	2
Linus Launcher	2011	Zamperla	Kite Flyer	3
Peanuts 500	2011	Zamperla	Speedway	2
Peanuts Road Rally	2000	Zamperla	Miniature car ride	2
Sally's Swing Set	2011	Zamperla	Happy Swing	2
Snoopy's Cloud Climbers	2011	Zamperla	Aerial Carousel	2
Snoopy's Junction	2011	Zamperla	Rio Grande Train	1
Snoopy's Rocket Express	2011	Zamperla	Aerial Ride	2
Woodstock Whirlybirds	2011	Zamperla	Teacups	2
Woodstock's Wagon Wheel	2000	Zamperla	Ferris wheel	2

== Defunct roller coasters ==
Name	Manufacturer	Type	Year opened	Year closed	Description
Scenic Railway	Frederick Ingersoll	Wooden roller coaster	1903	1920	Demolished
Wild Mouse	B.A. Schiff & Associates	Steel spinning roller coaster (wild mouse)	1964	1965	Demolished
Flying Dutchman	Pinfari	Steel roller coaster	1972	1988	Demolished
Hercules	Dinn Corporation	Wooden roller coaster	1989	2003	Demolished
Laser	Schwarzkopf	Steel launched shuttle roller coaster (Shuttle Loop)	1986	2008	Sold to Meyer & Rosenzweig and now operates on the German fair circuit as Teststrecke
Steel First	Allan Herschell Company	Steel children's roller coaster	1990	2010	Demolished
Dragon Coaster	Zamperla	Steel powered children's roller coaster	1992	2010	Relocated to Valleyfair as Cosmic Coaster
Stinger	Vekoma	Steel inverted roller coaster (Invertigo)	2012	2017	Demolished

== Other retired attractions ==
Name	Manufacturer	Type	Year opened	Year closed
Berenstain Bear Country	N/A	Themed children's area	1995	1999
Care Bears: Care-A-Lot Castle	Sally Industries	Animatronic show	1988	1992
Hangtime	HUSS Park Attractions	Top Spin	1998	2014
Joker	Zamperla	Joker	1988	2004
Meteor	Zamperla	Ranger	2002	2024
Monster	Eyerly Aircraft Company	Monster ride	1995	2023
Paratrooper	Unknown	Paratrooper	1960s	2000
Screamin Swing	S&S – Sansei Technologies	Screamin' Swing	2005	2015
Skyscraper	Gravity Works Inc.	Booster	2000	2004
Sky Ride	Von Roll	Elevated gondola ride	Unknown	1998
Apollo	Moser's Rides	Swing Around	1984	2024

== Wildwater Kingdom ==
Wildwater Kingdom opened in 1985 and is located on the park grounds. It has many water attractions. Admission to the water park is included with admission to Dorney Park.

Wildwater Kingdom has 22 water slides, three aquatic play areas for children, a water funhouse, two tubing rivers, two wave pools, and other water rides. In the 2006 season, the park introduced an additional wave pool, called Wildwater Cove, to accommodate the immense popularity of the park's existing wave pool.

=== Attractions ===
Ride	Opened	Manufacturer	Description	Thrill level
Aquablast	1991	Fred Langford	Multi-person water slide	5
Aqua Racer	2007	WhiteWater West	Multi-lane mat racer water slide	4
Boa Blasters	2014	WhiteWater West	Two enclosed tube water slides featuring sharp drops	5
Cascade	1990	Fred Langford	Double tube water slides	4
Constrictor	2014	WhiteWater West	Enclosed water slide with four 360 degree turns	5
Jumpin' Jack Splash	2003	WhiteWater West	One open-air and two enclosed body water slides	2
Kids Cove	1992	Fred Langford	Children's splash play area	1
Lightning Falls	1990	Fred Langford	Two tube water slides	5
Lollipop Lagoon	1990s	Unknown	Children's splash play area	1
Patriot's Plunge	2003	WhiteWater West	Three water slides	5
Python Plummet	2014	WhiteWater West	Three trapdoor water slides	5
Runaway River	1987	Unknown	Lazy river	2
Seaside Splashworks	2021	WhiteWater West	Multi-level water play structure with six water slides	1
Splash Landing	2003	WhiteWater West	Children's splash play area	1
Wave Pool	1985	Unknown	Wave pool	4
Wildwater Cove	2006	ADG	Wave pool	4
Wildwater Rapids	2003	WhiteWater West	Two enclosed and two open-air body water slides	4
Wildwater River	1990	Unknown	Lazy river	2

== Fast Lane ==
Fast Lane is a secondary queue system available at amusement parks owned by Six Flags. For an additional cost separate from park admission, visitors can purchase Fast Lane passes in the form of a wrist band, which grants them access to a shorter queue available on many popular attractions.

== Halloween attractions ==
=== Halloween Haunt ===
Dorney Park's Halloween Haunt event was introduced in 1998 as HalloWeekends, but was overhauled and rebranded to Halloween Haunt in 2008. Halloween Haunt is intended for mature audiences and is not recommended for guests under the age of 13.

Halloween Haunt at Dorney Park is an annual event on weekends in September, October, and early November featuring haunted houses, scare zones, live shows, Halloween decorations, and seasonal food and drink offerings. Most of the park's rides and attractions are also open for night rides during the event.

=== Tricks and Treats ===
Dorney Park's family-friendly Halloween event, Boo! Blast, was introduced along with Halloween Haunt in 2008 as its daytime counterpart.

Since its introduction, the event has gone through several name changes and overhauls. The scare-free event was re-branded and upgraded as Snoopy's Halloween Party in 2015. It was rebranded again in 2016 as The Great Pumpkin Fest. In 2024, The Great Pumpkin Fest became Tricks and Treats, offering completely different games, experiences, and activities from the previous events.

== In popular culture ==
- In the 2022 Halloween episode of the ABC comedy Abbott Elementary, the janitor Mr. Johnson references a photograph taken at Dorney Park.
- In 2009, Dorney Park was featured in the TruTV show All Worked Up.
- In 2005, portions of the music video for "Dirty Little Secret" by The All-American Rejects were filmed at Dorney Park.
- In 1988, the film Hairspray, Dorney Park is featured as the backdrop for the fictitious "Tilted Acres" amusement park.
- In 1968, portions of the film Where Angels Go, Trouble Follows were filmed at Dorney Park.

== See also ==
- List of historic places in Allentown, Pennsylvania
- List of water parks
- Trolley park
