= Talon (roller coaster) =

Inverted roller coaster at Dorney Park

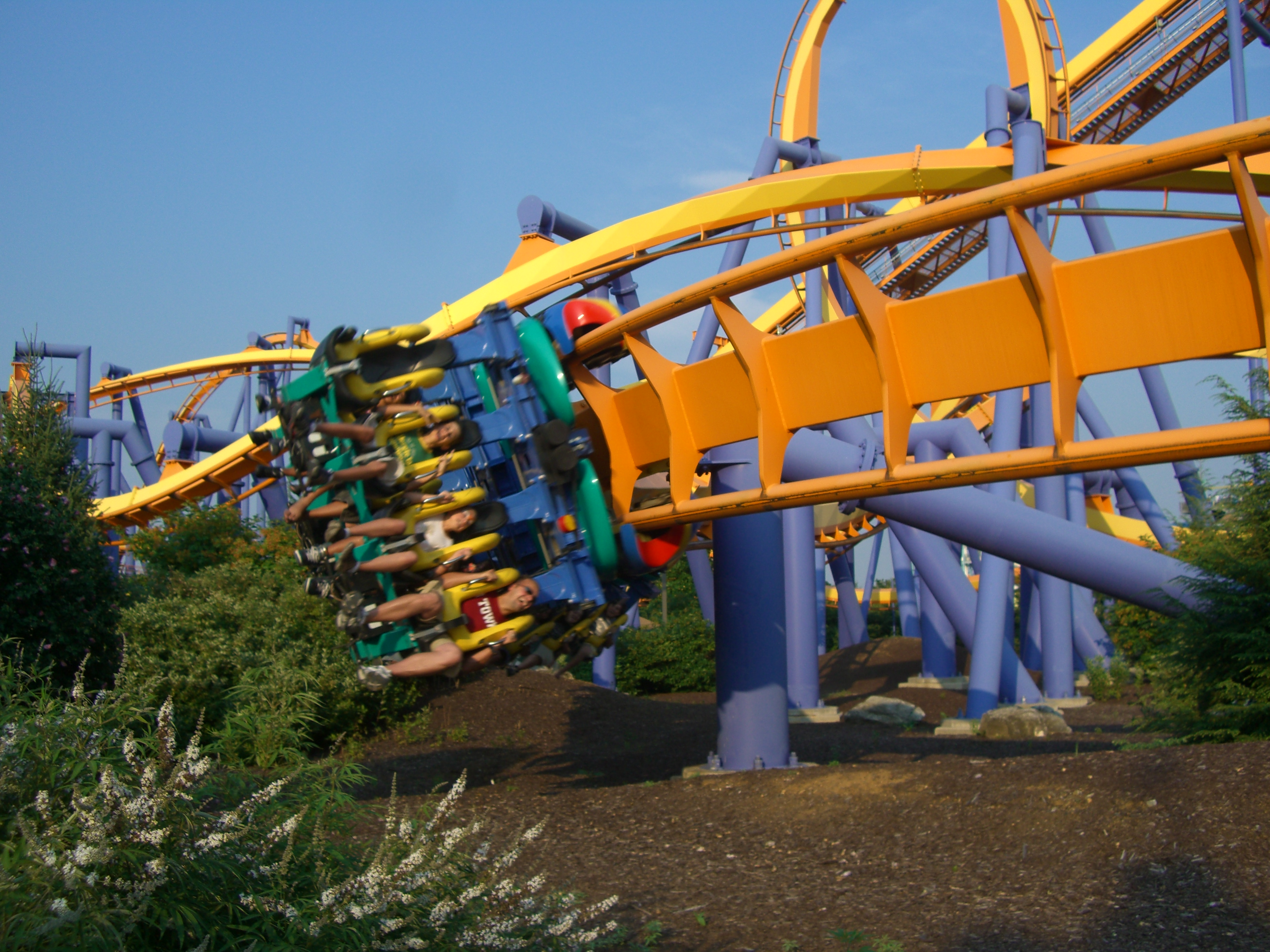
- Talon's steeply-banked, low-to-the-ground turn at Dorney Park & Wildwater Kingdom in Allentown, Pennsylvania

Dorney Park & Wildwater Kingdom
- Location: Dorney Park & Wildwater Kingdom
- Coordinates: 40.579°N 75.53°W
- Status: Operating
- Opening date: May 5, 2001
- Cost: US$13,000,000

General statistics
- Type: Steel – Inverted
- Manufacturer: Bolliger & Mabillard
- Designer: Werner Stengel
- Model: Inverted Coaster
- Lift/launch system: Chain lift hill
- Height: 135 ft (41 m)
- Drop: 120 ft (37 m)
- Length: 3,110 ft (950 m)
- Speed: 58 mph (93 km/h)
- Inversions: 4
- Duration: 2:00
- Max vertical angle: 50°
- Capacity: 1200 riders per hour
- G-force: 4.5
- Height restriction: 54 in (137 cm)
- Trains: 2 trains with 8 cars; riders arranged 4 across in a single row for a total of 32 riders per train
- Fast Lane available
- Talon at RCDB

Talon: The Grip of Fear, or simply Talon, is an inverted roller coaster located at Dorney Park & Wildwater Kingdom in Dorneyville, Pennsylvania. Manufactured by Bolliger & Mabillard (B&M) and designed by Werner Stengel at a cost of $13 million, Talon opened to the public in 2001 and was marketed as the tallest and longest inverted coaster in the Northeastern United States. It stands 135-foot (41 m) tall, reaches a maximum speed of 58 mph (93 km/h), and features four inversions.

== History ==
On April 28, 2000, Dorney Park announced that a 135-foot-tall (41 m) inverted roller coaster with four inversions would be built for the 2001 season. No further details were given until August 30, 2000, when Dorney Park fully announced the ride, including its name, Talon. The ride would be the Northeast's longest inverted roller coaster and would be built on a portion of land set aside for a major attraction by Cedar Fair when they purchased the park in 1992. Construction began on September 5, 2000 and continued through the winter. The first parts of Talon to be put into place were the brake run and transfer track in October 2000. The roller coaster was topped off on November 21, 2000, and the track was completed in early 2001. After testing was completed, Talon opened on May 5, 2001.

== Ride experience ==
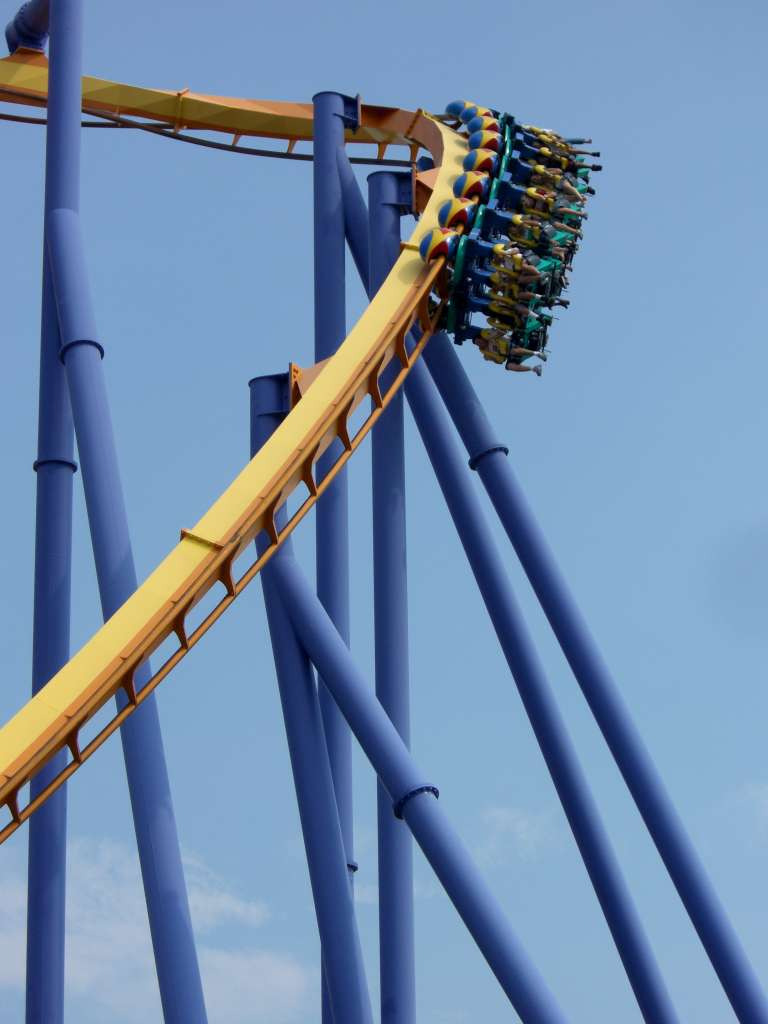
Talon's first drop

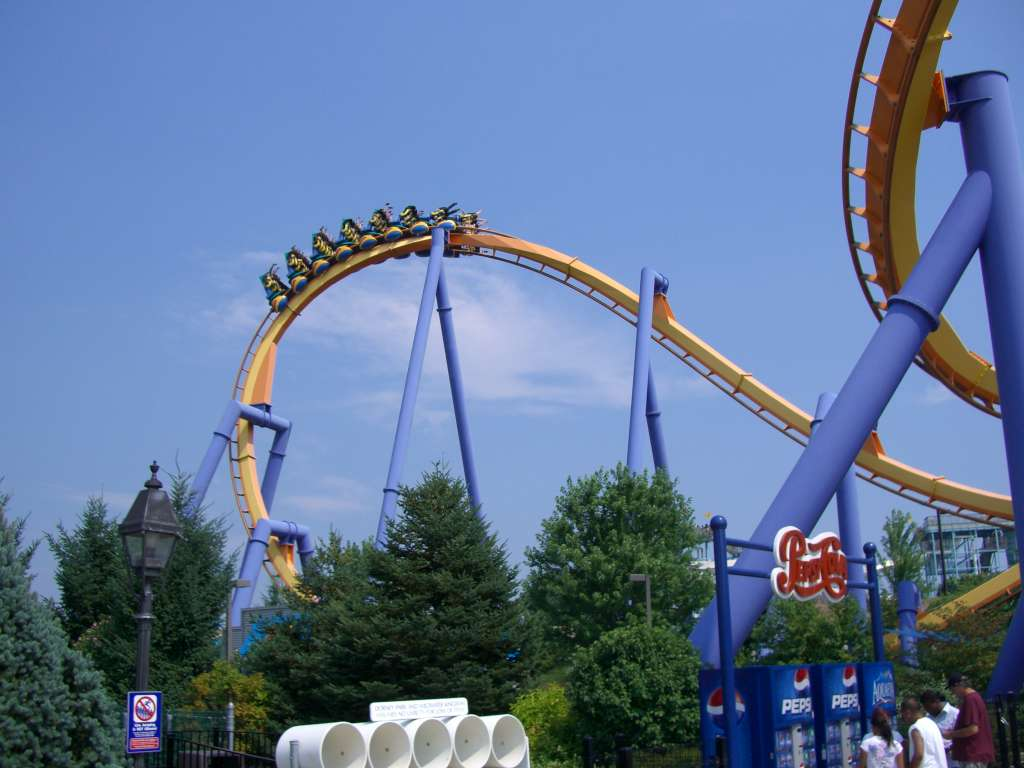
Talon's Immelmann loop

After dispatching from the station, the train begins to climb the 135-foot (41 m) lift hill. Once at the top, the train goes through a pre-drop before making a sharp 120-foot (37 m) downward right turn. The train then enters a 98-foot (30 m) tall vertical loop. After exiting the loop, the train goes through a zero-gravity roll before dropping back to the ground and entering an Immelmann loop. The train then makes a full 360-degree upward right turn followed by a left turn leading into another drop. After the drop, the train makes a highly banked right turn into a flat spin. Next, the train makes a left turn extremely close to the ground, before entering a moment of airtime going into the brake run. After exiting the brake run, the train makes a right turn into a second, shorter set of brakes before entering the station.

One cycle of the ride lasts about 2 minutes.

== Characteristics ==
=== Trains ===
Talon operates with two steel and fiberglass trains. Each train has eight cars that can seat four riders in a single row for a total of 32 riders per train. The train structure is colored blue and turquoise, the seats are black, and the over-the-shoulder restraints are yellow.

=== Track ===
The steel track of Talon is approximately 3,110 feet (950 m) long, the height of the lift is approximately 135 feet (41 m) high, and the entire track weighs just under 3,000,000 pounds (1,400,000 kg). It was manufactured by Clermont Steel Fabricators located in Batavia, Ohio. Unlike other B&M coasters, the track is filled with sand to reduce the noise produced by the trains. The tracks are painted orange and yellow while the supports are blue.

=== Slogan & theme ===
The ride's slogan is "The grip of fear." Its name, "Talon", comes from the claws found on birds of prey and mythical creatures. The ride is themed after birds of prey.

== Awards ==
Golden Ticket Awards: Top steel Roller Coasters
Year									1998	1999
Ranking									–	–
Year	2000	2001	2002	2003	2004	2005	2006	2007	2008	2009
Ranking	–	–	–	–	42	–	40 (tie)	–	–	–
Year	2010	2011	2012	2013	2014	2015	2016	2017	2018	2019
Ranking	–	–	–	–	–	–	–	–	–	–
Year	2020	2021	2022	2023	2024	2025	2026			
Ranking	N/A	–	–	–	–	–	–			

Mitch Hawker's Best Roller Coaster Poll: Best steel-Tracked Roller Coaster
Year	2001	2002	2003	2004	2005	2006	2007	2008	2009	2010	2011	2012	2013
Ranking	27	35	32	27	46	48	87	67	66	66	No poll	94	91
