= Teststrecke =

Steel roller coaster

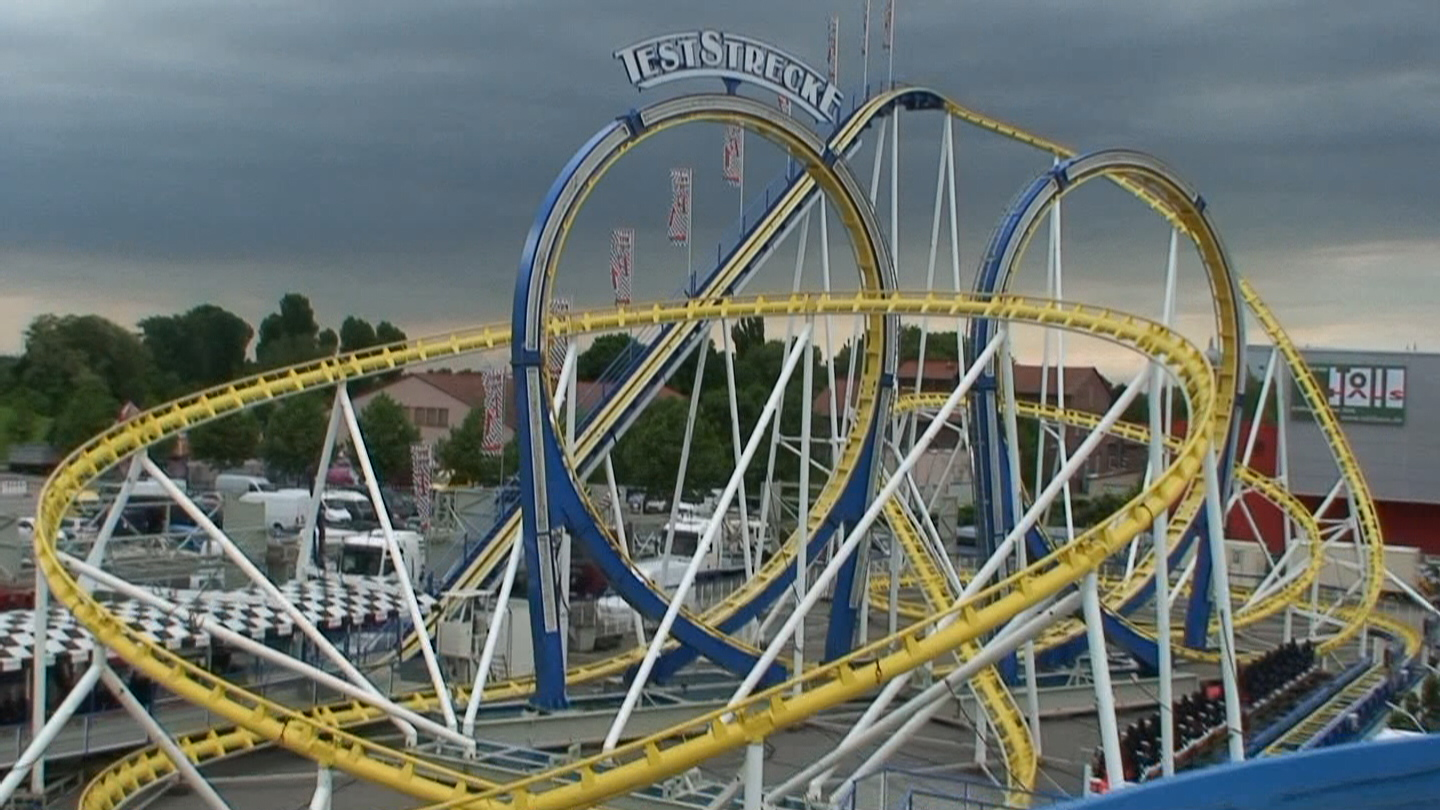
- Teststrecke at Karlsruhe

Germany
- Coordinates: 51°N 9°E
- Status: Operating
- Opening date: 2009

Dorney Park & Wildwater Kingdom
- Name: Laser
- Coordinates: 40.578°N 75.532°W
- Status: Removed
- Opening date: May 1986
- Closing date: November 1, 2008
- Replaced by: Stinger
- Laser at Dorney Park & Wildwater Kingdom at RCDB

Playcenter São Paulo
- Name: Colossus
- Coordinates: 21.867°S 48.175°W
- Status: Removed
- Opening date: Unknown
- Closing date: 1986
- Colossus at Playcenter São Paulo at RCDB

General statistics
- Type: Steel
- Manufacturer: Anton Schwarzkopf
- Designer: Werner Stengel
- Model: Double Looping
- Track layout: Custom
- Lift/launch system: Chain lift hill
- Height: 93 ft (28 m)
- Length: 2,200 ft (670 m)
- Speed: 52 mph (84 km/h)
- Inversions: 2
- Duration: 2:00
- Height restriction: 48 in (122 cm)

Teststrecke, meaning Test Track in German, is a portable steel roller coaster owned by the German showman partnership Meyer & Rosenzweig. It was imported from Dorney Park & Wildwater Kingdom in 2008 and mostly tours in Germany, with occasional visits to the Netherlands.

Designed by renowned ride engineer Anton Schwarzkopf, the ride was previously named Laser and Colossus.

== Characteristics ==
The trains on Teststrecke are themed to resemble racing cars and were designed by SAT Consulting. Each train has a single lap bar to secure riders in their seats. It can operate three trains at peak times, but runs with one when there are short queues. The coaster is portable in that it is not attached to the ground.

== Layout ==
The ride starts with a chain lift hill ascending 93 feet (28 m), leading to a right hand near-vertical curved first drop, followed by two consecutive vertical loops. The ride then turns into a left-hand helix, up and through the center of the second loop. Another left turn helix leads down and straight upward diagonally between the vertical loops, followed by a 360-degree helix, starting from the right, leading into a brake run that leads into two right turns and back into the station.

== Gallery ==
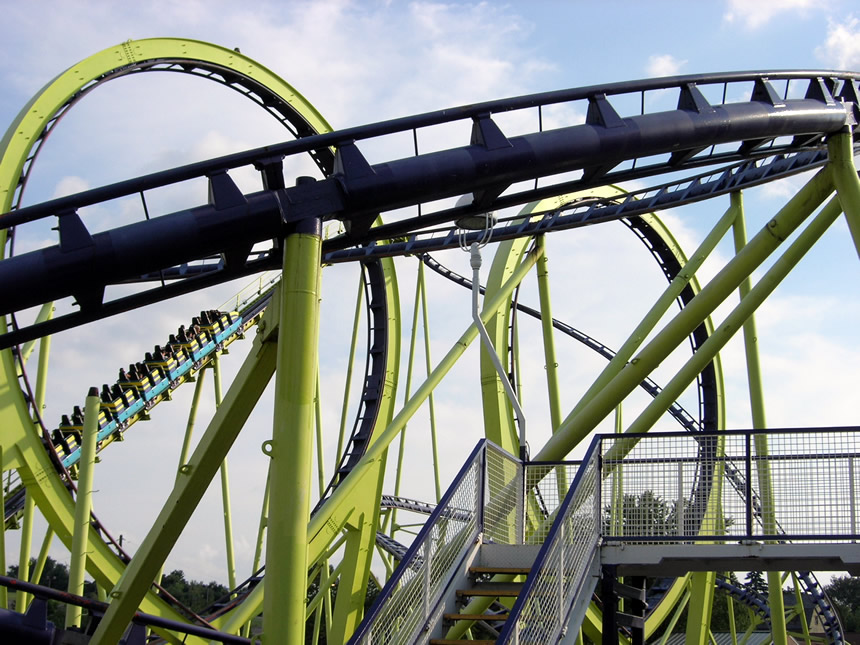
Teststrecke when it was Laser (previously Colossus) at Dorney Park & Wildwater Kingdom in Allentown, Pennsylvania
