= Cosmic Coaster (Valleyfair) =

Roller coaster in Shakopee, Minnesota

- Previously known as Dragon Coaster at Dorney Park & Wildwater Kingdom

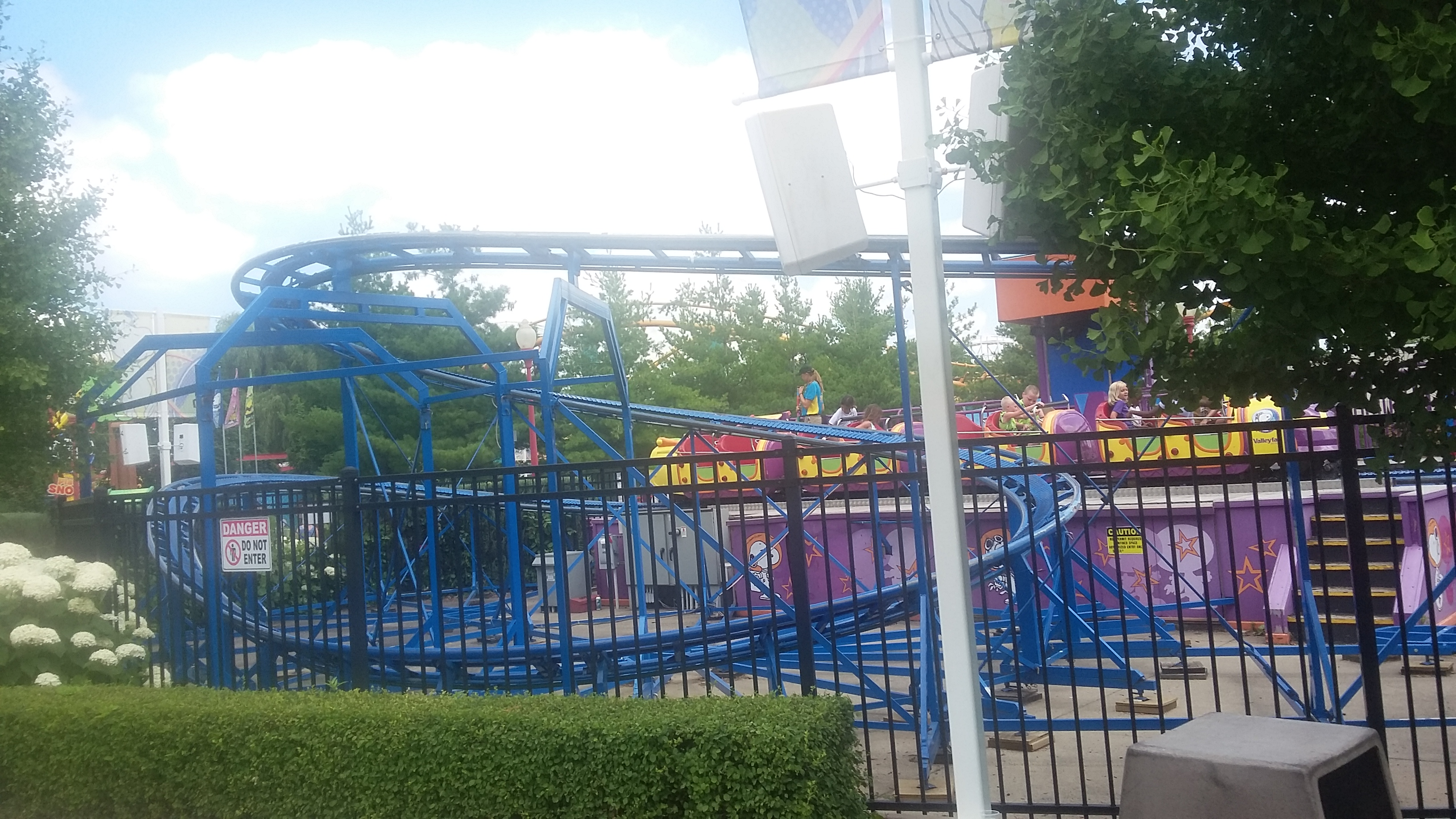
- Cosmic Coaster's helix

Valleyfair
- Park section: Planet Snoopy
- Coordinates: 44.799472°N 93.457757°W
- Status: Operating
- Opening date: May 14, 2011
- Cosmic Coaster at Valleyfair at RCDB

Dorney Park & Wildwater Kingdom
- Name: Dragon Coaster
- Coordinates: 40.577608°N 75.537689°W
- Status: Removed
- Opening date: 1992
- Closing date: 2010
- Dragon Coaster at Dorney Park & Wildwater Kingdom at RCDB

General statistics
- Type: Steel – Junior – Powered
- Manufacturer: Zamperla
- Model: Powered Coaster
- Height: 14 ft (4.3 m)
- Length: 215 ft (66 m)
- Speed: 15 mph (24 km/h)
- Inversions: 0
- Duration: 2:30
- Trains: Single train with 4 cars; riders arranged 2 across in 2 rows for a total of 16 riders per train

Cosmic Coaster is a steel junior roller coaster at Valleyfair.

The ride was originally known as Dragon Coaster when it was located at Dorney Park & Wildwater Kingdom in Allentown, Pennsylvania. It was built in 1986 and operated from 1992 through 2010. After the 2010 season, Dragon Coaster was removed from Dorney Park. It was relocated to Valleyfair where it has operated since 2011 as Cosmic Coaster.

Cosmic Coaster has a single train with four cars. Each car has two rows of two seats each for a total of 16 passengers.

== See also ==
- 2011 in amusement parks
