= White Water Landing (Dorney Park) =

Water ride

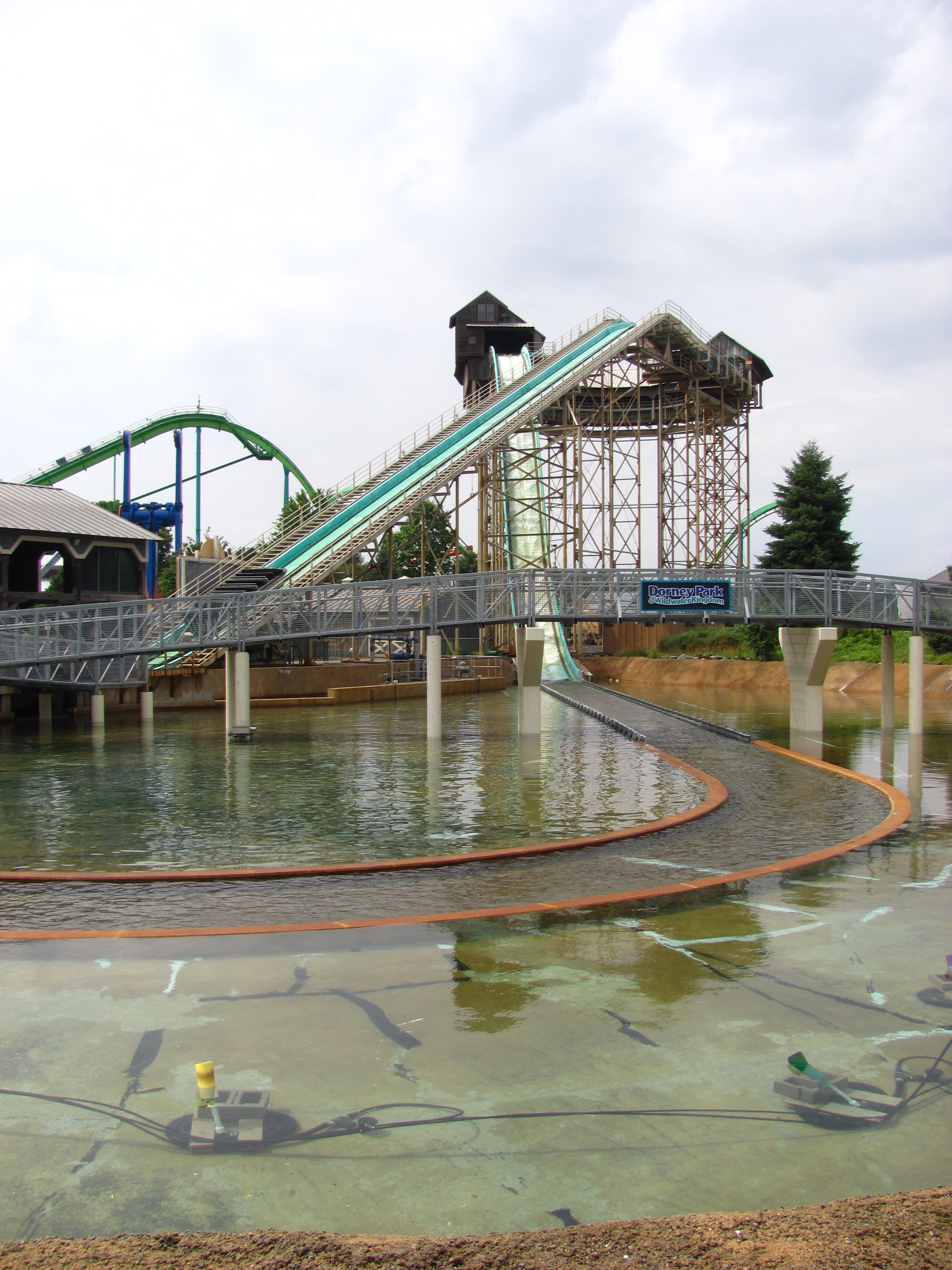

Dorney Park & Wildwater Kingdom
- Status: Operating
- Opening date: 1993

General statistics
- Type: Shoot the Chute
- Manufacturer: Arrow Dynamics
- Lift system: Chain
- Drop: 80 ft (24 m)
- Length: 445 ft (136 m)
- Speed: 42 mph (68 km/h)
- Max vertical angle: 50°
- Height restriction: 48 in (122 cm)
- Fast Lane available

White Water Landing is a Shoot-the-Chutes ride at Dorney Park & Wildwater Kingdom amusement park in Allentown, Pennsylvania. Manufactured by Arrow Dynamics, it opened in 1993, and is located near Hydra the Revenge. White Water Landing is identical to the defunct Snake River Falls at Cedar Point in Sandusky, Ohio.

== Experience ==
The ride uses a chain lift hill as opposed to a conveyor belt like most water rides. The boat rises 80 feet (24 m) and turns around under a tunnel at the top. It then drops 80 feet (24 m) at a 50-degree angle at a speed of 42 miles per hour (68 km/h). The ride ends with a giant wave that drenches riders and guests watching the ride. A bridge is located at the bottom of the hill where visitors can stand to get soaked by passing boats.
