= Powered roller coaster =

Type of roller coaster

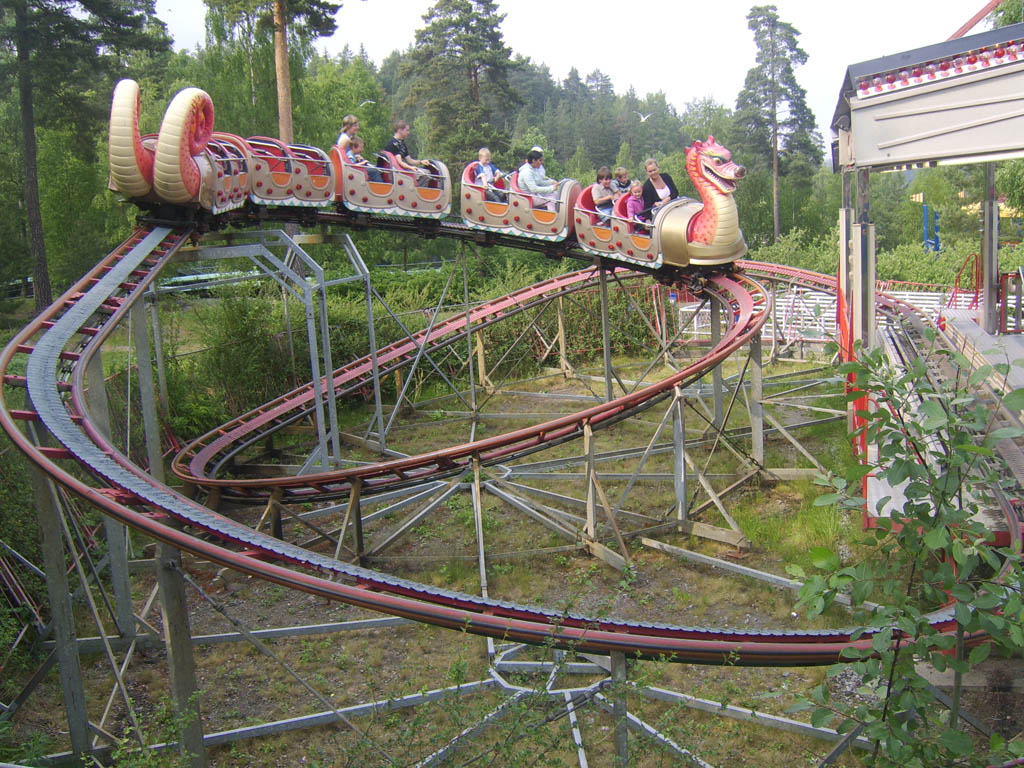
A powered coaster at TusenFryd

A powered roller coaster is a railed amusement ride similar to a standard roller coaster. Unlike a true roller coaster, the train is powered through the entire course, rather than being allowed to coast after an initial lift or launch. This allows for both compact layouts that start out with curving hills, or long, extended layouts that would need too many lifts to be feasible. The most common manufacturers of powered coasters are Mack, Wisdom Rides, and Zamperla. Due to the family-oriented nature of the rides, height restrictions can be as little as 36 inches or taller for someone to ride.

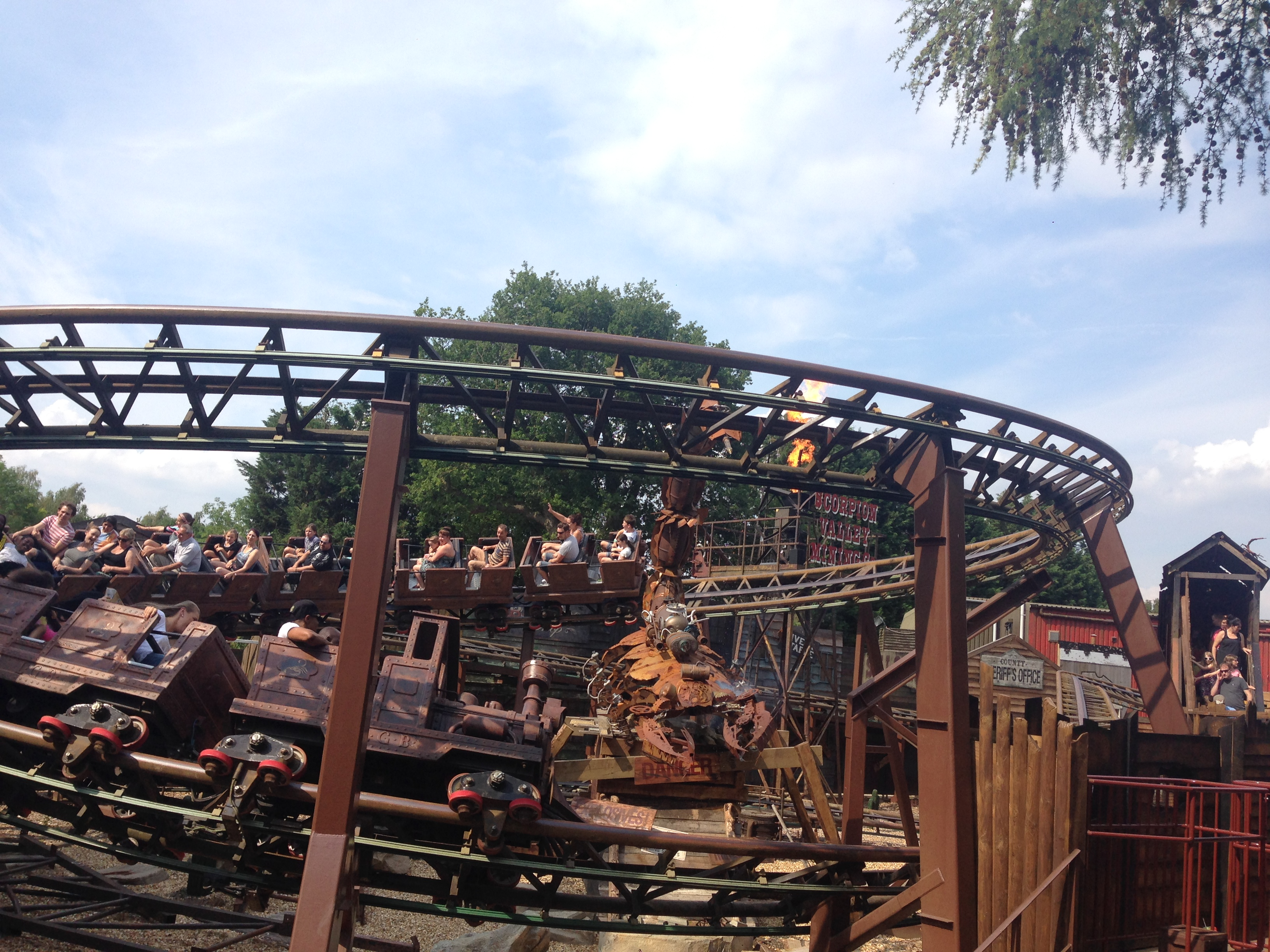
Former Mack powered roller coaster Scorpion Express at Chessington World of Adventures

The most common model of powered coasters is the Zamperla Dragon coasters (also called "Dragon Wagons," although there are non-powered versions of these coasters). Other installations include Casey Junior, Le Petit Train du Cirque at Disneyland Park (Paris) (built by Vekoma), Thunder Run at Canada's Wonderland and Runaway Mine Train at Alton Towers.

The train on a powered coaster usually picks up electricity from contacts in the rails (similar to an electric locomotive or a monorail) and may contain multiple motors. Some powered coasters are powered by a flexible cable connected to the train. Another component of powered coasters is an extra "track" in the center of the rails. This allows the tyres attached to the motor to "grip" the track and propel the train forward.

A powered coaster generally runs a single train and may traverse the circuit multiple times before stopping at the station.

In Genting highlands, The Flying Dragon was the world's longest powered roller coaster in terms of ride length but has been demolished.

A very rare Powered Coaster was at Camelot Theme Park in England. The "Dragon Flyer" ride had diesel engine in the front of the themed dragon and was driven around the track by the ride staff.

== Model types ==
- Larson International - Fire Ball
- Wisdom Rides - Orient Express
- Zamperla - Dragon Coaster

== Appearances ==
- Santa's Village AZoosment Park as "Dracor, the Dragon Coaster" (Zamperla - Dragon Coaster) (1986-2006) and "Dragon Coaster" (Wisdon Rides - DOrient Express) (2011-Present)
