= Roller coaster =

Rail-based amusement park ride

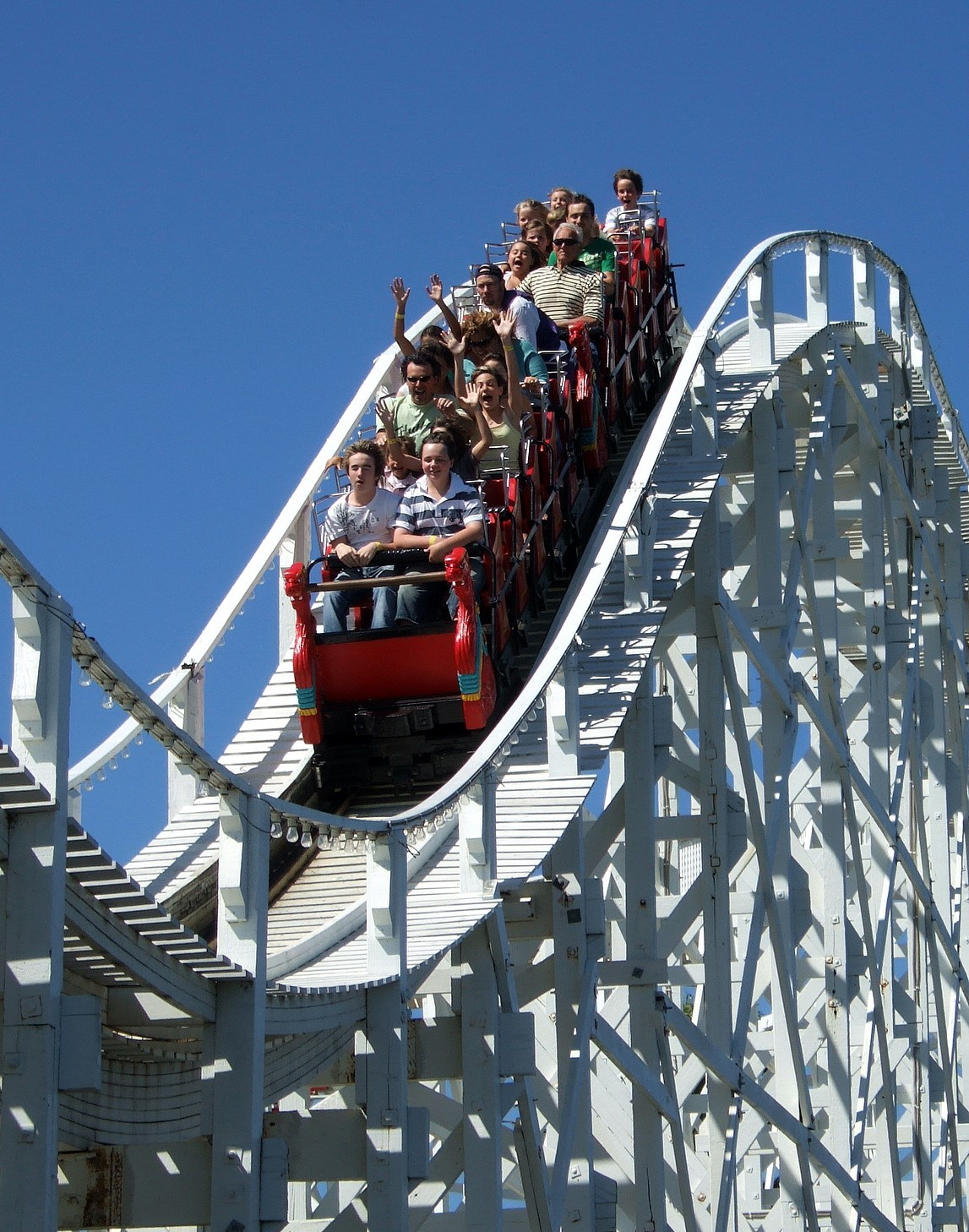
The Great Scenic Railway at Luna Park, Melbourne, is the world's oldest operating roller coaster, built in 1912.

A roller coaster is a type of amusement ride employing a form of elevated railway track that carries passengers on a train through hills, turns, valleys, and other elements, to exert abnormal g-forces on the body. Roller coasters are usually designed to produce a thrilling experience, though some roller coasters aim to provide a more gentle experience. Trains usually consist of open cars connected in a single line, and tracks are typically built and designed as a complete circuit in which trains depart from and return to the same loading station. The rides are typically found in amusement parks around the world but can also be located in zoos. The Roller Coaster DataBase records over 6,000 extant roller coasters as of January 2026.

The earliest progenitors to the modern roller coasters were the "Russian Mountains", which first appeared in the 17th century. LaMarcus Adna Thompson obtained one of the first known patents for a track-based roller coaster design in 1885, based on the Switchback Railway which opened a year earlier at Coney Island. Today, most roller coasters are built out of steel, which can allow for more intense forces and inversions, although modernized versions of wooden coasters still exist.

== History ==
=== The Russian Mountains and the Aerial Promenades ===
The oldest roller coasters are believed to have originated from the so-called "Russian Mountains"; specially constructed hills of ice located in the area that is now Saint Petersburg, Russia. Built in the 17th century, the slides were built to a height of between 70 and 80 feet (21 and 24 m), had a 50-degree drop, and were reinforced by wooden supports. Later, in 1784, Catherine the Great is said to have constructed a sledding hill in the gardens of her palace at Oranienbaum in St. Petersburg.

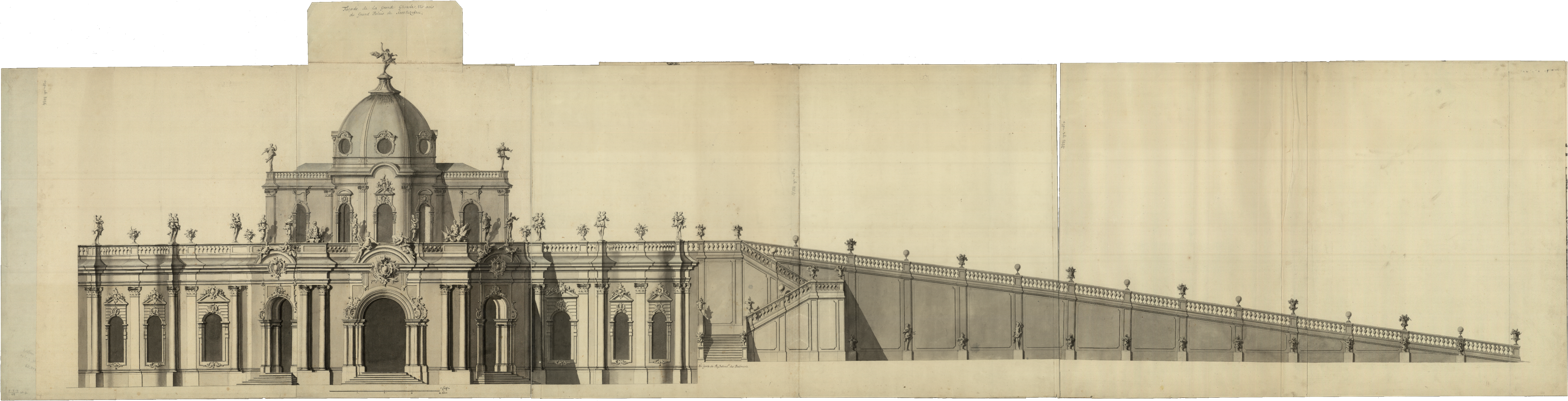
La Grande Glisade, Tsarskoye Selo

The Riding Mountain (aka La Grande Glisade) entertainment pavilion designed by Bartolomeo Francesco Rastrelli for Tsarskoye Selo royal residence was built in 1754–1757. In Russian it was known as Katalnaya gora (Катальная гора, literally "Mountain for riding") It was a huge building in the shape of rotunda. It had a trail with five hills, which could be covered with ice in winter. In the summertime, the trails used trolleys on wheels secured in the steel grooves mounted on the wooden trails. Due to a pendulum-like motion based on inertia, all five hills could be traversed in one ride. The ride was engineered by Russian scientist Andrey Nartov. Katalnaya gora was dismantled in 1792–1795. Currently in its place is the Granite Terrace in the Catherine Park.

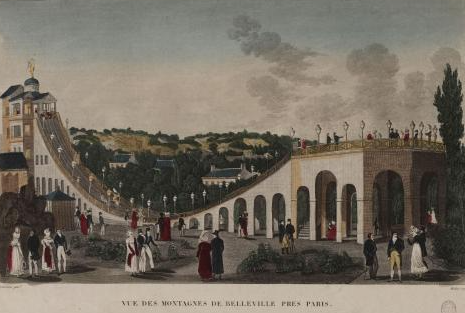
Les Montagnes de Belleville

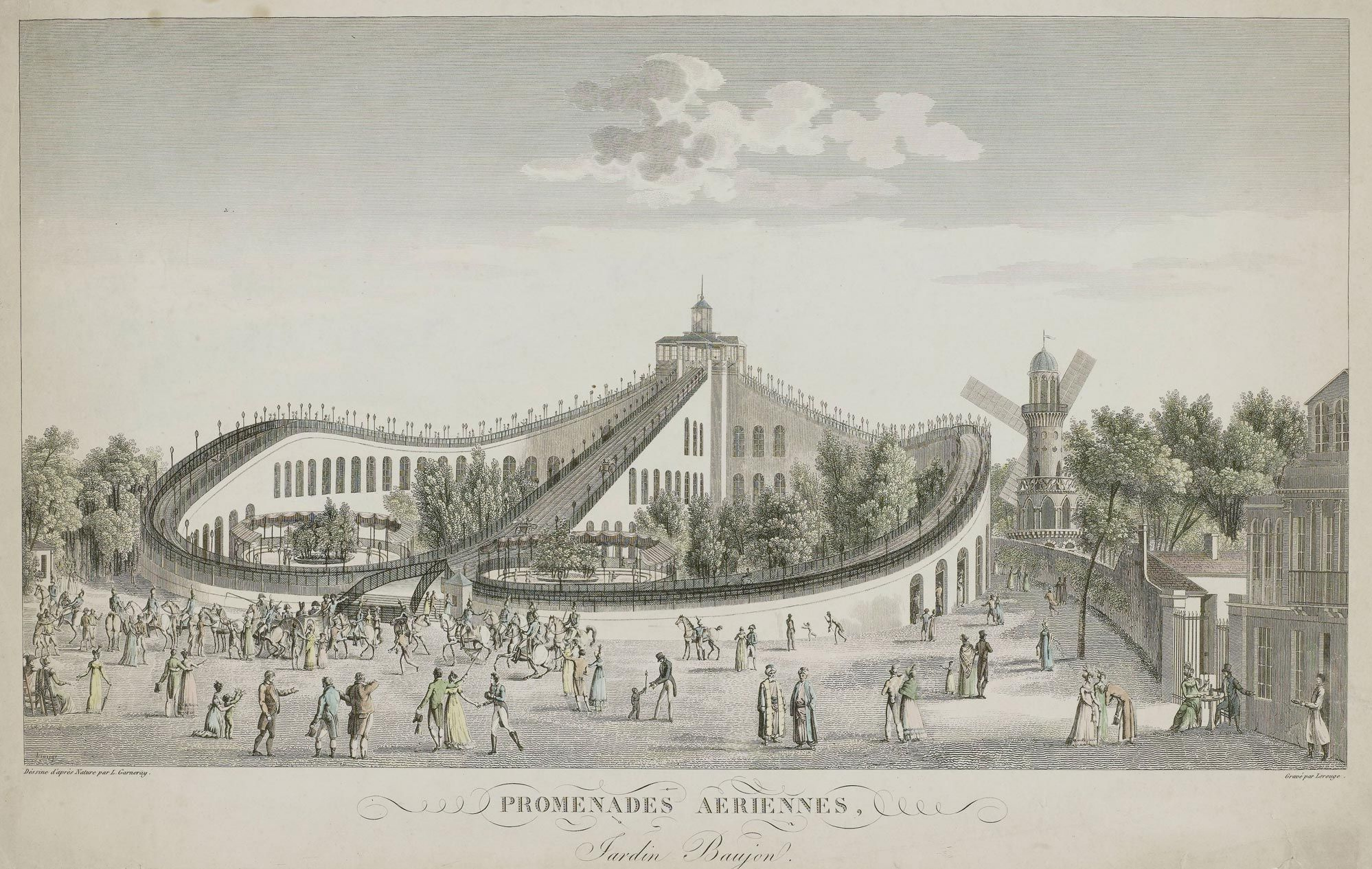
The Promenades-Aériennes in Paris, 1817

Two early forms of roller coaster were built in France in 1817. Les Montagnes de Belleville (Les Montagnes Russes à Belleville) in Belleville, Paris had wheels attached to carriages and locked on tracks. The Promenades Aériennes, opened in Parc Beaujon in Paris on July 8, 1817 had wheeled cars securely locked to the track, guide rails to keep them on course, and higher speeds. It spawned half a dozen imitators, but their popularity soon declined.

However, during the Belle Epoque they returned to fashion. In 1887, Catalan entrepreneur Joseph Oller, co-founder of the Moulin Rouge music hall, constructed the Montagnes Russes de Belleville, "Russian Mountains of Belleville" with 656 feet (200 m) of track laid out in a double-eight, later enlarged to four figure-eight-shaped loops.

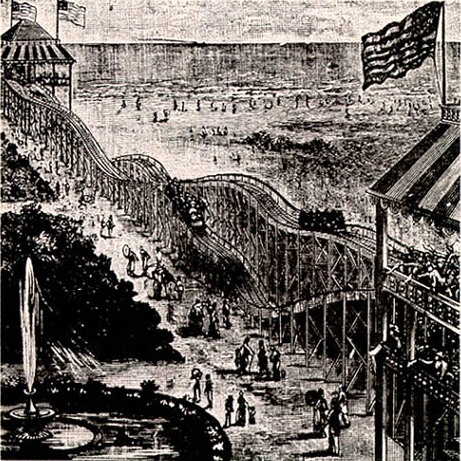
Thompson's Switchback Railway, 1884

=== Scenic railways ===
In 1827, a mining company in Summit Hill, Pennsylvania constructed the Mauch Chunk Switchback Railway, a downhill gravity railroad used to deliver coal to Mauch Chunk, Pennsylvania – now known as Jim Thorpe. By the 1850s, the "Gravity Road" (as it became known) was selling rides to thrill seekers. Railway companies used similar tracks to provide amusement on days when ridership was low.

Using this idea as a basis, LaMarcus Adna Thompson began work on a gravity Switchback Railway that opened in 1884 at Coney Island in Brooklyn, New York. Passengers climbed to the top of a platform and rode a bench-like car down the 600-foot (183 m) track up to the top of another tower where the vehicle was switched to a return track and the passengers took the return trip. This track design was soon replaced with an oval complete circuit. In 1885, Phillip Hinkle introduced the first full-circuit coaster with a lift hill, the Gravity Pleasure Road, which became the most popular attraction at Coney Island. Not to be outdone, in 1886 Thompson patented his design of roller coaster that included dark tunnels with painted scenery. "Scenic railways" were soon found in amusement parks across the county.

=== Popularity, decline, and revival ===
By 1919, the first underfriction roller coaster had been developed by John Miller. Over the next decade, roller coasters spread to amusement parks around the world and began an era in the industry often referred to as the "Golden Age". One of the most well known from the period is the historical Cyclone that opened at Coney Island in 1927. The onset of the Great Depression in the 1930s, however, significantly impacted the amusement park industry and brought an end to the rapid growth experienced during the Golden Age. This aside, roller coasters were still built with varying success from location to location. In May 1932, the Scene Railway witnessed somewhat of a revival in the UK, including the opening of the roller coaster at Great Yarmouth. Today it is the only scenic railway still in operation in the UK.

In 1959, Disneyland introduced a design breakthrough with Matterhorn Bobsleds, the first permanent roller coaster to use a tubular steel track. Designed by Arrow Development, the tubular track was unlike standard rail design on wooden coasters, allowing the track to bend in sharper angles in any direction, leading to the incorporation of loops, corkscrews, and inversion elements into track layouts. A little more than a decade later, the immediate success of The Racer at Kings Island in 1972 sparked a new era of roller coaster enthusiasm, which led to a resurgence across the amusement park industry over the next several decades.

In 1989 Cedar Point introduced Magnum XL-200, the first ever hyper coaster. This kicked off a so called roller coaster war that would push the limits of what could be done. This would last into the early 2000s with rides such as Millennium Force, Top Thrill Dragster, and Kingda Ka being constructed. Kingda Ka marked the end of this period as no park wanted to invest the amount of money needed to surpass the height of this 456-foot (139 m) ride.

== Etymology ==
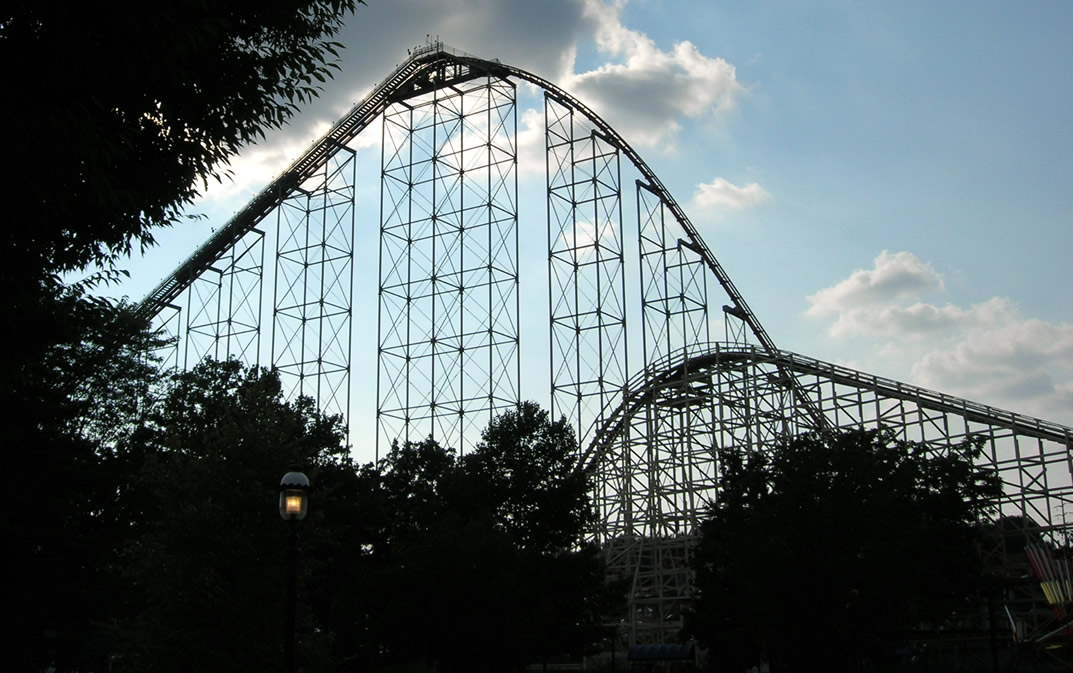
Steel Force (left) and Thunderhawk (right), two roller coasters at Dorney Park & Wildwater Kingdom in Allentown, Pennsylvania. Steel Force is the eighth longest steel roller coaster in the world.

There are several explanations for the name roller coaster. It is said to have originated from an early American design where slides or ramps were fitted with rollers over which a sled would coast. This design was abandoned in favor of fitting the wheels to the sled or other vehicles, but the name endured.

Another explanation is that the phrase originated from a ride located in a roller skating rink in Haverhill, Massachusetts, in 1887. A toboggan-like sled was raised to the top of a track which consisted of hundreds of rollers. This Roller Toboggan then took off down gently rolling hills to the floor. The inventors of this ride, Stephen E. Jackman and Byron B. Floyd, say they were the first to use the term "roller coaster".

The term jet coaster (ジェットコースター, jetto kōsutā) is used for roller coasters in Japan, where such amusement park rides are very popular.

In many languages, including most Romance languages, the name refers to "Russian mountains". Conversely, in Russian, they are called "American hills" (Американские горки, Amerikanskiye gorki). In the Scandinavian languages, the roller coaster is referred as "mountain-and-valley railway". German has the word Achterbahn, stemming from Figur-8-Bahn, relating to the form of the number 8 (acht in German). This is similar to the Dutch Achtbaan, in which acht also means "eight".

== Mechanics ==
Video from inside a roller coaster car (Helix at Liseberg in Gothenburg, Sweden)

Roller coaster trains are not typically powered. Most are pulled up a lift hill by a chain or cable and released downhill. The potential energy accumulated by the rise in height is transferred to kinetic energy, which is then converted back into potential energy as the train rises up the next hill. Changes in elevation become smaller throughout the track's course, as some mechanical energy is lost to friction and air drag. A properly-designed, outdoor track will result in a train having enough kinetic energy to complete the entire course under a variety of stressful weather conditions.

In lieu of a lift hill, a train may also be set into motion by a launch mechanism such as a flywheel, linear induction motor, linear synchronous motor, hydraulic launch, or drive tire. Some launched roller coasters are capable of reaching greater speeds using less track when compared to traditional coasters that rely on a conventional lift hill.

A brake run at the end of the circuit is the most common method of stopping a roller coaster train as it returns to the station. One notable exception is a powered roller coaster, which instead of relying on gravity uses one or more motors to propel the trains along the course.

== Safety ==
Roller coasters are statistically very safe, although accidents still occur. The International Association of Amusement Parks and Attractions (IAAPA) reports that a rider has one chance in 15.5 million of being injured on a ride. Also, "In a typical year, more than 385 million guests enjoyed in excess of 1.7 billion rides at approximately 400 North American fixed-site facilities". IAAPA is required to report annual ride incidents to the National Safety Council.

=== Safety mechanisms and technology ===
A variety of safety mechanisms protect riders on roller coasters.

==== Block system ====
Most large roller coasters have the ability to run two or more trains at once.

The block system prevents these trains from colliding. In this system, the track is divided into two or more sections known as blocks.

- Only one train is permitted in each block at any given time.
- There is a section of track at the end of each block where a train can be stopped if necessary.
  - Examples include block brakes, the top of a lift hill (that can stop) and the station (train will not dispatch until the next block is clear).
- Sensors detect when a train passes so that the system's computer is aware of which blocks are occupied. If a train attempts to enter an occupied block, the stopping mechanisms in all blocks are engaged.

==== Seat restraints ====
Seat restraints are used to ensure that riders stay in their seats throughout the ride.

===== Types of restraints =====
| Type of restraint | Description | Pros | Cons | Ref. |
|---|---|---|---|---|
| Over-the-shoulder | Secures riders' torsos using a harness that is pulled down over the rider before the ride starts. | Can feel more secure for scared riders | Can cause headbanging; Can remove some airtime; Can feel cramped or claustrophobic | |
| Lap bar | Secures riders' laps using either a bar that's pulled from in front of riders or pulled down from above like over-the-shoulder restraints | More airtime; No headbanging; More open feel | Can feel insecure or exposing for scared riders; Can cause misconceptions that roller coasters with inversions that use lap bars are dangerous | |
| Vest | Similar to over-the-shoulder restraints but uses a vest pulled tightly on the rider's torso to secure them | No headbanging; Less bulky than over the shoulder restraints | Tight; Can remove airtime | |
| Seatbelt | Uses a belt across the rider's waist to secure them, or can be used as a fallback for other restraints | Can be used in conjunction with other restraint types as a fall-back; Can make scared riders feel more secure when used in conjunction with other restraints; When used alone is very open and very unrestrictive | Not suitable for most types of intense roller coasters | |

===== Restraint locking mechanisms =====
| Locking mechanism | Description | Ref. |
|---|---|---|
| Hydraulic | Uses hydraulic piston and fluid to lock restraints. When the restraint is pulled down, it forces liquid through a one-way valve. This liquid cannot return and thus the restraint stays closed. When the restraints are unlocked by the ride operator, an electrical signal is sent to another valve, which opens, allowing the fluid to return to the start position and letting the restraint rise. | |
| Ratcheting | Uses a toothed gear and pawl to lock restraints. When the restraint is pulled down, the pawl clicks into the next tooth on the gear. The pawl cannot go in the opposite direction. When the restraint is unlocked by the ride operator, an electrical signal is sent to the pawl which moves it out of the way and lets the restraint go back up. | |

Restraints use proximity sensors to determine if they are locked. If not all of the restraints are locked, the train cannot leave the station.

==== Braking systems ====
Braking systems such as pivoting pawls are used on the bottom of the train and on the inclined lift hill. While the train goes up the lift hill, it is pulled by a chain. The pawl moves over bumps that are separated closely apart. In the event that the train ever becomes disconnected from the chain, the anti rollback system will engage and it will fall back into the nearest downhill stop preventing the train from falling down the lift hill. This system creates the loud "clicking" sound that is heard on the lift hill of roller coasters.

==== Programmable logic controller ====
Another key to safety is the programmable logic controller, an essential component of a roller coaster's computer system. Multiple controllers work together to detect faults associated with operation and automate decisions to engage various elements (e.g. lift, brakes, etc.). Periodic maintenance and visual inspection by ride engineers are also important to verify that structures and materials are within expected wear tolerances and functioning correctly. Effective operating procedures further enhance safety.

=== Roller coaster design and statistics ===
Roller coaster design is another important aspect that requires a working knowledge of basic physics to enhance ride comfort and avoid harmful strain to the rider. Ride designers must carefully analyze the movement a ride subjects its riders to, ensuring it is within a reasonable tolerance. The human body needs sufficient time to react to sudden changes in force in order to control muscle tension and avoid harmful consequences such as whiplash. Designers typically stay in the range of 4 to 6 g (40 to 60 m/s^{2}) as a maximum for positive g-force acceleration, which increases the feeling of weight and pushes riders downward into their seat. High positive g-forces can lead to the sensation of a greyout or a loss of consciousness. For negative g-force (which causes the sensation of weightlessness and airtime), the target is 1.5 to 2 g (15 to 20 m/s^{2}) as a maximum. These fall into a range considered safe to a majority of the population. Lateral acceleration is also typically kept under 2 g (20 m/s^{2}), using various techniques including the banking of curves, which increases vertical acceleration and reduces lateral acceleration.

Wheels are a critical part in roller coaster design. The purpose of wheels is to keep the train on the track and to prevent it from flying off. A majority of roller coaster wheels are made from polyurethane. There are three kinds of roller coaster wheels which include road wheels, side friction wheels, and up-stop wheels. Road wheels ride on top of the track. Side friction wheels ride on the side of the track to keep the train on the track throughout turns. Up-stop wheels ride below the track and prevent the train from lifting off the track.

=== Health concerns ===
Some sources have shown concern over the ability of roller coasters to cause head trauma and serious injury such as the tearing of axons and damaging of blood vessels.

== Types ==
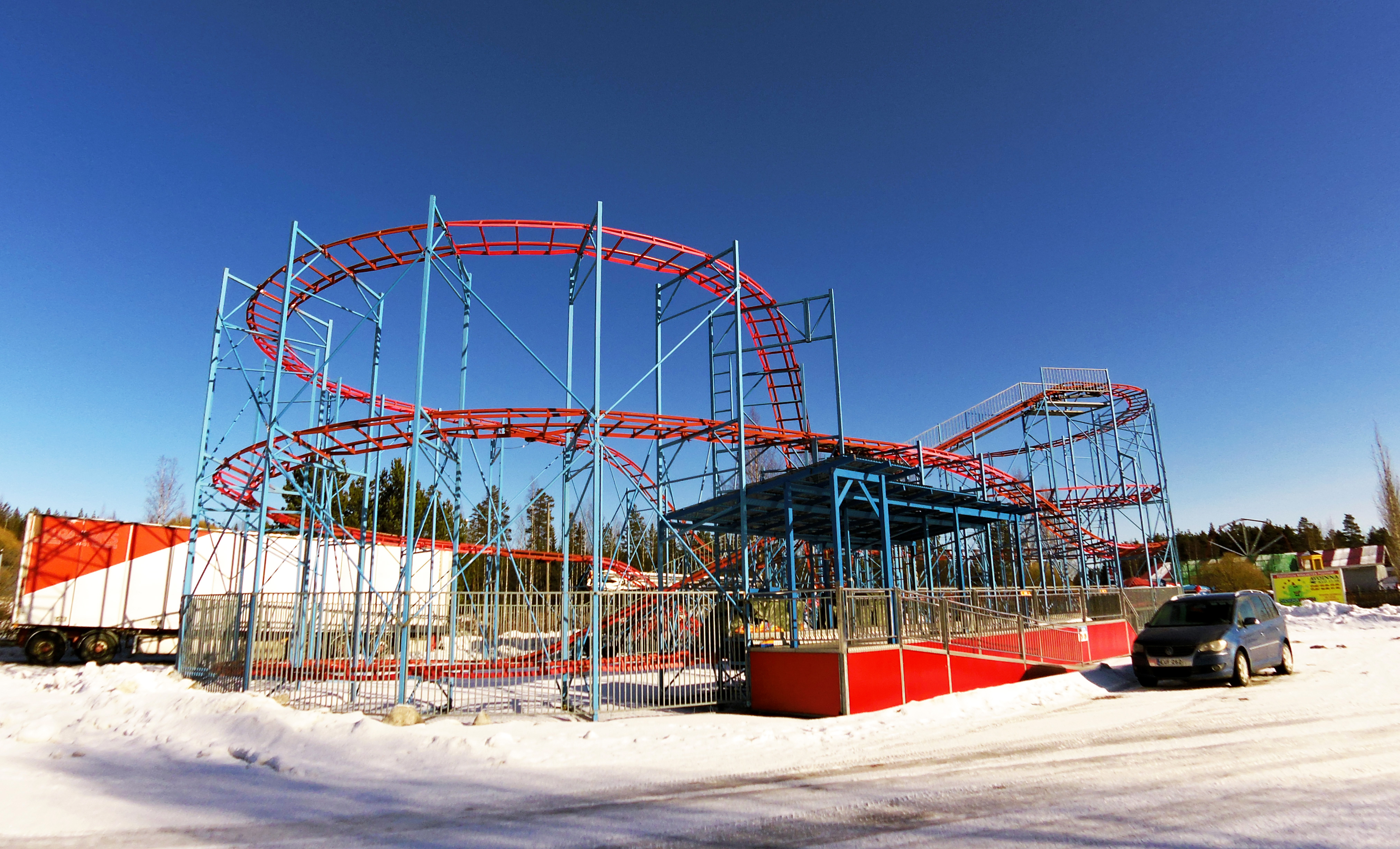
Cyclon roller coaster in the Nokkakivi amusement park in Laukaa, Finland

Roller coasters are divided into two main categories: steel roller coasters and wooden roller coasters. Steel coasters have tubular steel tracks, and compared to wooden coasters, they are typically known for offering a smoother ride and their ability to turn riders upside-down. Wooden coasters have flat steel tracks, and are usually supported with a lattice or truss. The vast majority of roller coasters operating today are made with steel. Newer types of track, such as I-Box and Topper introduced by Rocky Mountain Construction (RMC), improve the ride experience on wooden coasters, lower maintenance costs, and add the ability to invert riders.

Thunder Dolphin, a steel roller coaster in Tokyo, at dusk

A third classification type is often referred to as a hybrid roller coaster, which uses a mixture of wood and steel elements for the track and structure. Many, for example, have a track made out of steel and a support structure made from wood. RMC has notably redesigned wood coasters that have either deteriorated from age or been deemed by parks as too costly to maintain. RMC often replaces the wood track with their patented steel I-Box track design, while reusing much of the ride's wooden structure, resulting in a smoother ride with the incorporation of new design elements, such as inversions, sharper turns, and steeper drops.

Although the term "hybrid roller coaster" was not used until the 21st century, one of the oldest examples is Cyclone at Luna Park, which opened in 1927. It features a wood track and steel structure. Other older examples include mine train roller coasters, many of which were built by Arrow Dynamics. The term hybrid became more prominent after the introduction of New Texas Giant at Six Flags Over Texas in 2011. Many in the industry, however, continue to classify coasters strictly by their track type only, labeling them either steel or wood.

Modern roller coasters are constantly evolving to provide a variety of different experiences. More focus is being placed on the position of riders in relation to the overall experience. Traditionally, riders sit facing forward, but variations such as stand-up and flying models position the rider in different ways to change the experiences. A flying model, for example, places riders lying down and facing forward with their chests and feet strapped in. Other ways of enhancing the experience involve removing the floor beneath passengers riding above the track, as featured in floorless roller coasters. Unique track elements, such as new inversions, are often introduced to provide entirely new experiences. One variation, a shuttle roller coaster, reverses at some point throughout the course of the ride to traverse the same track backwards. Parks have also experimented with using virtual reality to augment the coaster experience.

=== By train type ===
- Bobsled
- Floorless
- Flying
- Fourth-dimension
- Inverted
- Mine train
- Motorbike
- Summer toboggan, also known as Mountain/Alpine coaster
- Pipeline
- Side friction
- Single-rail
- Spinning
  - Virginia Reel
- Stand-up
- Steeplechase
- Suspended
- Water coaster
- Wing
- Wild mouse

=== By model ===
- Accelerator Coaster
- Boomerang
- Dive Coaster
- El Loco
- Galaxi
- Euro-Fighter
- Giant Inverted Boomerang
- Impulse
- Infinity Coaster
- Invertigo
- Launched Loop
- Polercoaster
- SFX Coaster
- Shuttle Loop
- Sky Rocket II
- SkyLoop
- Suspended Family Coaster
- Suspended Looping Coaster
- Thrust Air 2000
- Toboggan
- Vekoma Junior Coaster

=== By track layout ===
- Dual-tracked
- Figure 8
- Out and back
- Shuttle
- Terrain
- Twister
- Wild mouse

=== By mechanics ===
- Lift hill
- Launched
- Powered

=== By height ===
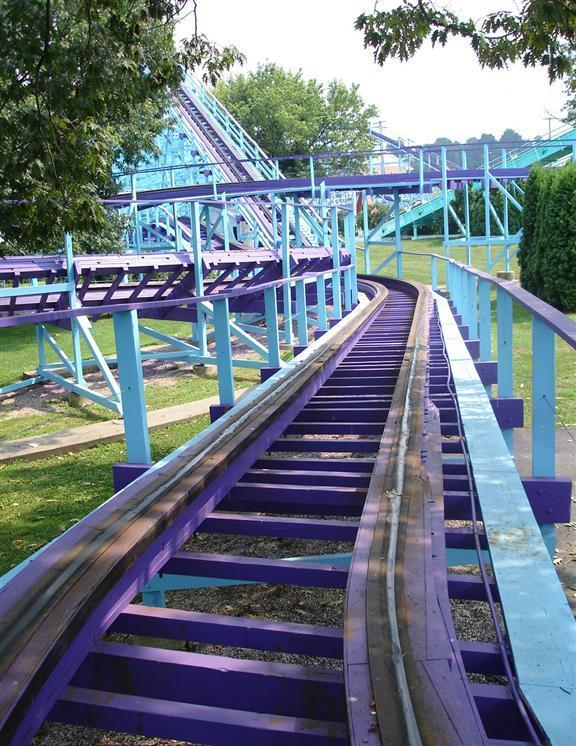
Family coaster: Kingdom Coaster at Dutch Wonderland in Lancaster, Pennsylvania, is a 55-foot-tall (17 m) coaster that reaches a top speed of 40 mph (64 km/h)

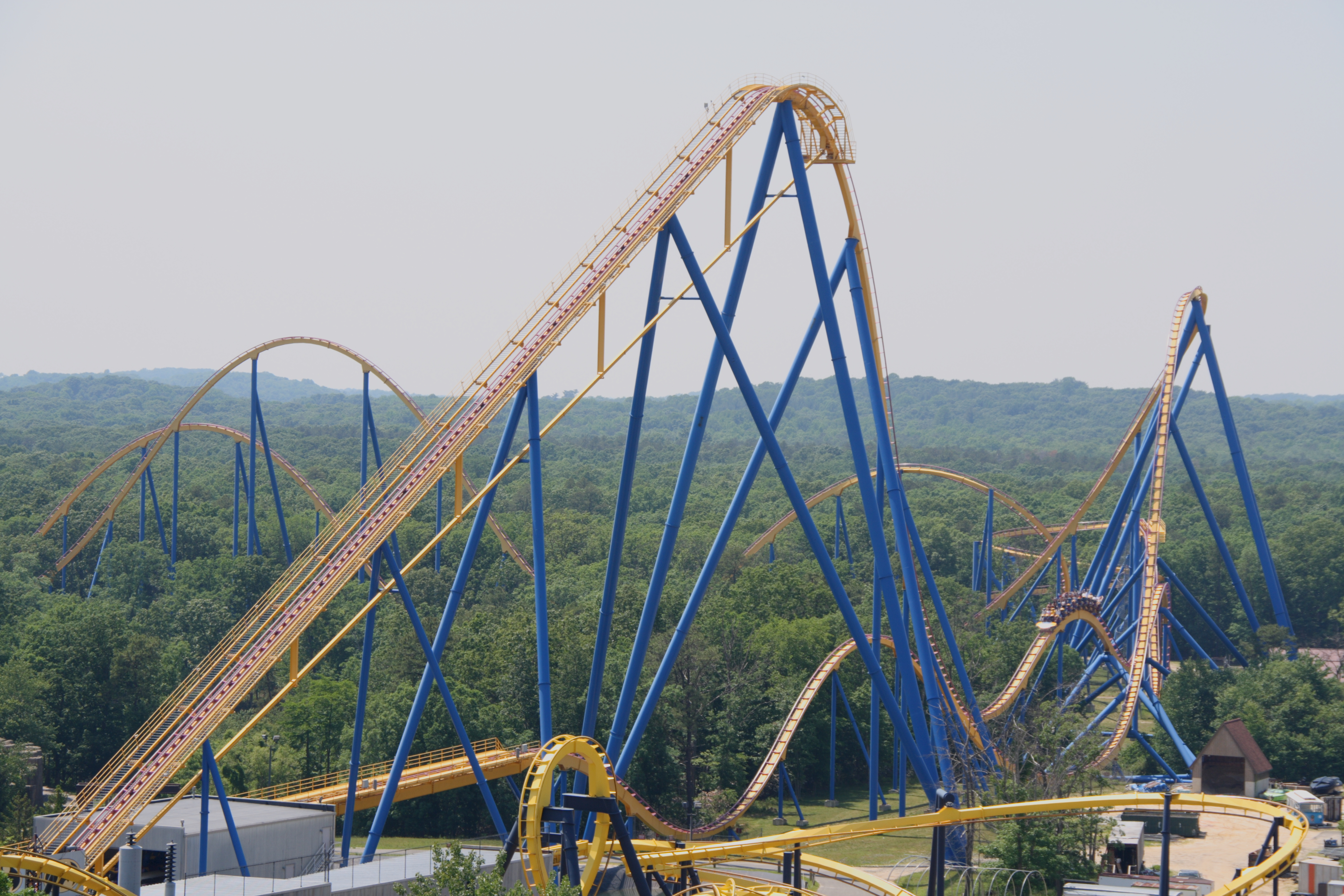
Mega/Hyper coaster: Nitro at Six Flags Great Adventure, a Bolliger & Mabillard out and back coaster.

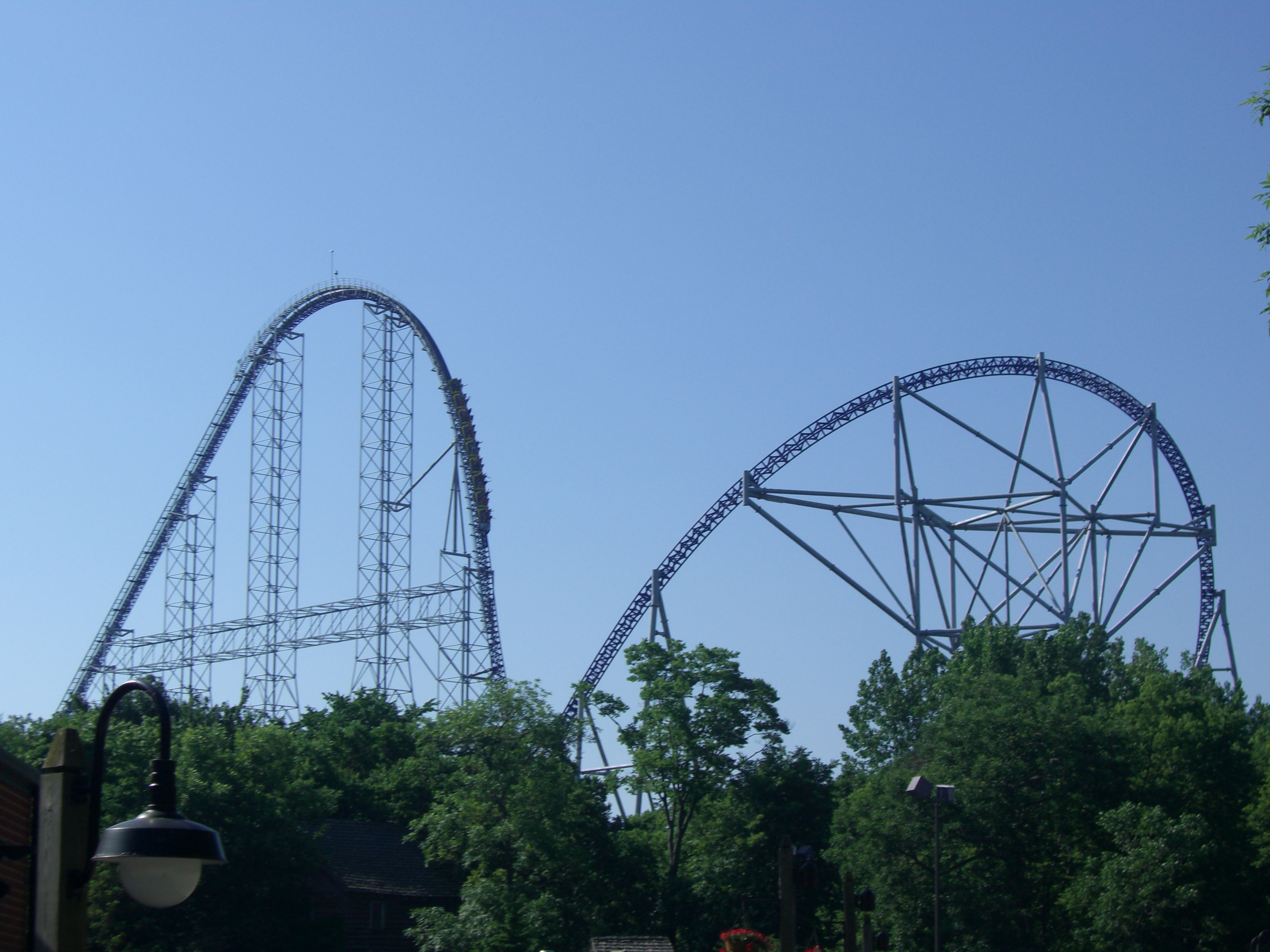
Giga coaster: Millennium Force is a Intamin designed roller coaster at Cedar Point in Sandusky, Ohio.

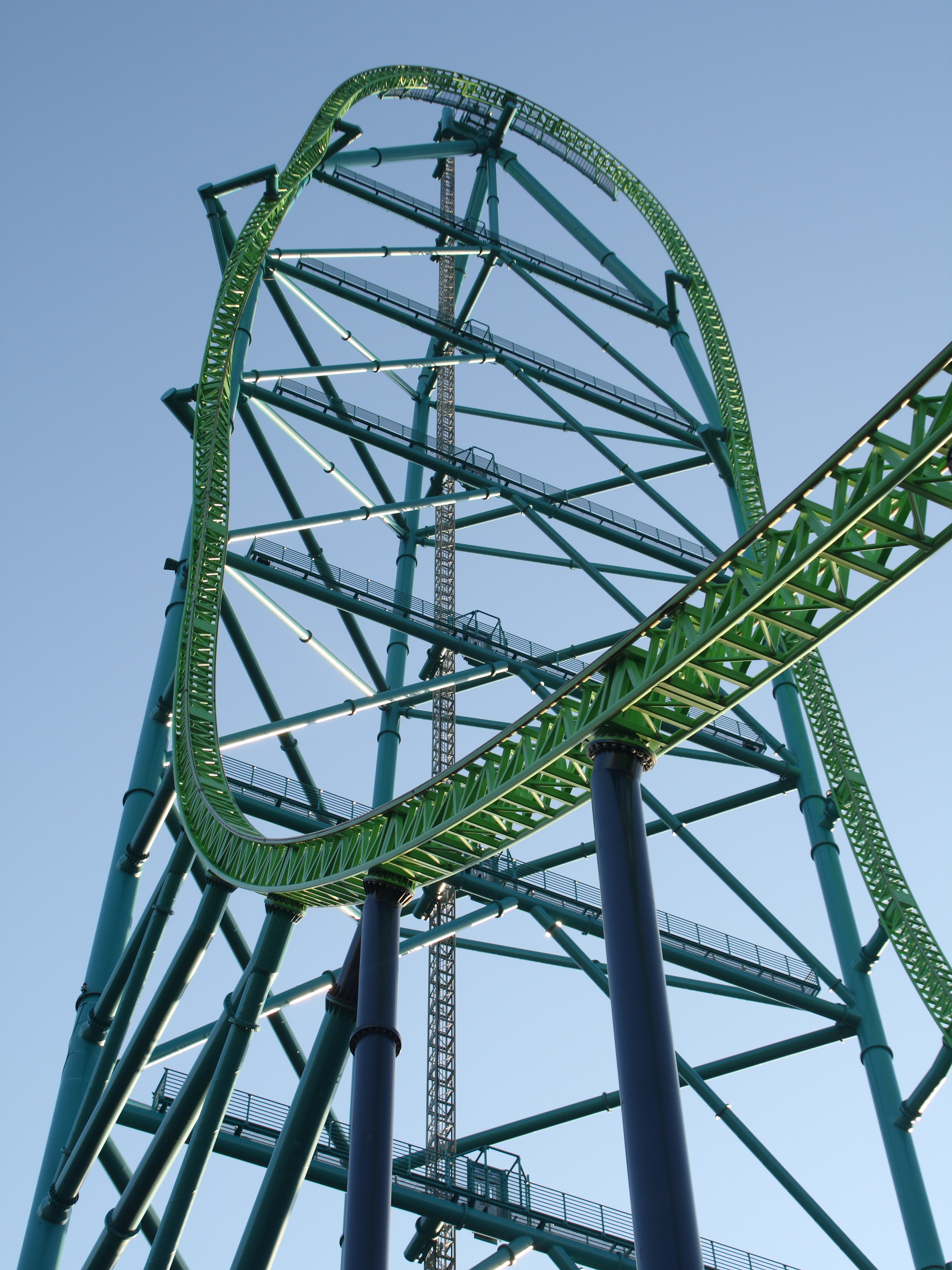
Strata coaster: Once the tallest coaster in the world, the 456-foot-tall (139 m) Kingda Ka at Six Flags Great Adventure closed in 2024.

Several height classifications have been used by parks and manufacturers in marketing their roller coasters, as well as enthusiasts within the industry. One classification, the kiddie coaster, or family coaster, is a roller coaster specifically designed for younger riders. Following World War II, parks began pushing for more of them to be built in contrast to the height and age restrictions of standard designs at the time. Companies like Philadelphia Toboggan Company (PTC) developed scaled-down versions of their larger models to accommodate the demand. These typically featured lift hills smaller than 25 feet (7.6 m), and still do today. The rise of kiddie coasters soon led to the development of "junior" models that had lift hills up to 45 feet (14 m). A notable example of a junior coaster is the Sea Dragon – the oldest operating roller coaster from PTC's designer John Allen – which opened at Wyandot Lake in 1956 near Powell, Ohio.

==== Hypercoaster ====
A hypercoaster, occasionally stylized as hyper coaster, is a type of roller coaster with a height or drop of at least 200 feet (61 m). Moonsault Scramble, which debuted at Fuji-Q Highland in 1984, was the first to break this barrier, though the term hypercoaster was coined by Cedar Point and Arrow Dynamics with the opening of Magnum XL-200 in 1989. Hypercoasters have become one of the most predominant types of roller coasters in the world, now led by manufacturers Bolliger & Mabillard and Intamin.

==== Giga coaster ====
A giga coaster is a type of roller coaster with a height or drop of at least 300 feet (91 m). The term was coined during the construction of the Millennium Force roller coaster built by Intamin on Cedar Point amusement park in 2000. Morgan and Bolliger & Mabillard have both also produced roller coasters in this class.

| Name | Park | Manufacturer | Status | Opened | Height | Drop | Ref. |
|---|---|---|---|---|---|---|---|
| Millennium Force | Cedar Point | Intamin | Operating | May 13, 2000 | 310 feet (94 m) | 300 feet (91 m) | |
| Steel Dragon 2000 | Nagashima Spa Land | Morgan | Operating | August 1, 2000 | 318.2 feet (97.0 m) | 306.8 feet (93.5 m) | |
| Pantherian | Kings Dominion | Intamin | Operating | April 2, 2010 | 305 feet (93 m) | 300 feet (91 m) | |
| Leviathan | Canada's Wonderland | Bolliger & Mabillard | Operating | May 6, 2012 | 306 feet (93 m) | 306 feet (93 m) | |
| Fury 325 | Carowinds | Bolliger & Mabillard | Operating | March 25, 2015 | 325 feet (99 m) | 320 feet (98 m) | |
| Red Force | Ferrari Land | Intamin | Operating | April 7, 2017 | 367 feet (112 m) | N/A | |
| Orion | Kings Island | Bolliger & Mabillard | Operating | July 2, 2020 | 287 feet (87 m) | 300 feet (91 m) | |
| Tormenta Rampaging Run | Six Flags Over Texas | Bolliger & Mabillard | Operating | July 9, 2026 | 309 feet (94 m) | 285 feet (87 m) | |

==== Strata coaster ====
A strata coaster is a type of roller coaster with a height or drop of at least 400 feet (120 m). As with the other two height classifications, the term strata was first introduced by Cedar Point with the release of Top Thrill Dragster, a 420-foot-tall (130 m) roller coaster that opened in 2003. Kingda Ka was the second strata coaster, and it opened at Six Flags Great Adventure in 2005 as the tallest roller coaster in the world with a height of 456 feet (139 m). Top Thrill Dragster closed in 2021 following an incident in which a guest was severely injured while standing in line. The ride was subsequently refurbished and modified, and it reopened in 2024 as Top Thrill 2. Kingda Ka was permanently closed on November 10, 2024, and was later demolished in late February 2025.

Superman: Escape From Krypton, a 415-foot (126 m) coaster, operated at Six Flags Magic Mountain from 1997 to 2024. It is not classified as a strata coaster due to it being a shuttle coaster, where the train does not travel a complete circuit.

| Name | Park | Manufacturer | Status | Opened | Modified | Height | Ref. |
|---|---|---|---|---|---|---|---|
| Top Thrill 2 | Cedar Point | Intamin/Zamperla (Note: Originally built in 2003 by Intamin and later renovated by Zamperla in 2024.) | Operating | May 4, 2003 | May 4, 2024 | 420 feet (130 m) | |
| Kingda Ka | Six Flags Great Adventure | Intamin | Removed | May 21, 2005 | —N/a | 456 feet (139 m) | |

==== Exa coaster ====
An exa coaster is a type of roller coaster with a height or drop of at least 600 feet (180 m). The term exa was first introduced by Intamin for Falcons Flight, a 640-foot (200 m) (Note: Falcons Flight has been advertised with a height of 640 feet (200 m). This is the difference from the highest point to lowest point. Its tallest freestanding element is the 534.8 feet (163.0 m) camelback hill.) coaster that opened at Six Flags Qiddiya City in December 2025. Upon opening, it became the tallest, fastest, and longest coaster in the world, surpassing the previous records once held by Top Thrill 2, Formula Rossa, and Steel Dragon 2000.

| Name | Park | Manufacturer | Status | Opened | Height | Ref. |
|---|---|---|---|---|---|---|
| Falcons Flight | Six Flags Qiddiya City | Intamin | Operating | December 31, 2025 | 640 feet (200 m) | |

== Major roller coaster manufacturers ==
- Allan Herschell Company (defunct, merged with Chance Rides)
- Arrow Development (acquired by Huss Trading Corporation, formed into Arrow-Huss)
- Arrow Dynamics (defunct, assets bought by S&S Arrow)
- ART Engineering
- Arrow-Huss (defunct, reformed as Arrow Dynamics)
- B.A. Schiff & Associates
- Bolliger & Mabillard
- Bradley and Kaye (defunct)
- Chance Morgan
- Chance Rides
- Custom Coasters International (defunct)
- D. H. Morgan Manufacturing (acquired by Michael Chance, formed into Chance Morgan)
- Dinn Corporation (defunct)
- Dynamic Structures
- E&F Miler Industries
- Fabbri Group
- Gerstlauer
- Giovanola (defunct)
- The Gravity Group
- Great Coasters International
- Hopkins Rides
- Intamin
- Mack Rides
- Maurer AG
- Martin & Vleminckx
- Philadelphia Toboggan Coasters
- Pinfari (defunct)
- Premier Rides
- Preston & Barbieri
- Reverchon SAMC (formerly known as Reverchon Industries)
- Rocky Mountain Construction
- Roller Coaster Corporation of America (defunct)
- Sansei Technologies
- S&S - Sansei Technologies (formerly known as S&S Worldwide)
- SBF Visa Group
- Schwarzkopf (defunct)
- TOGO (defunct)
- Vekoma
- Zamperla
- Zierer

== Gallery ==
Roller Coasters

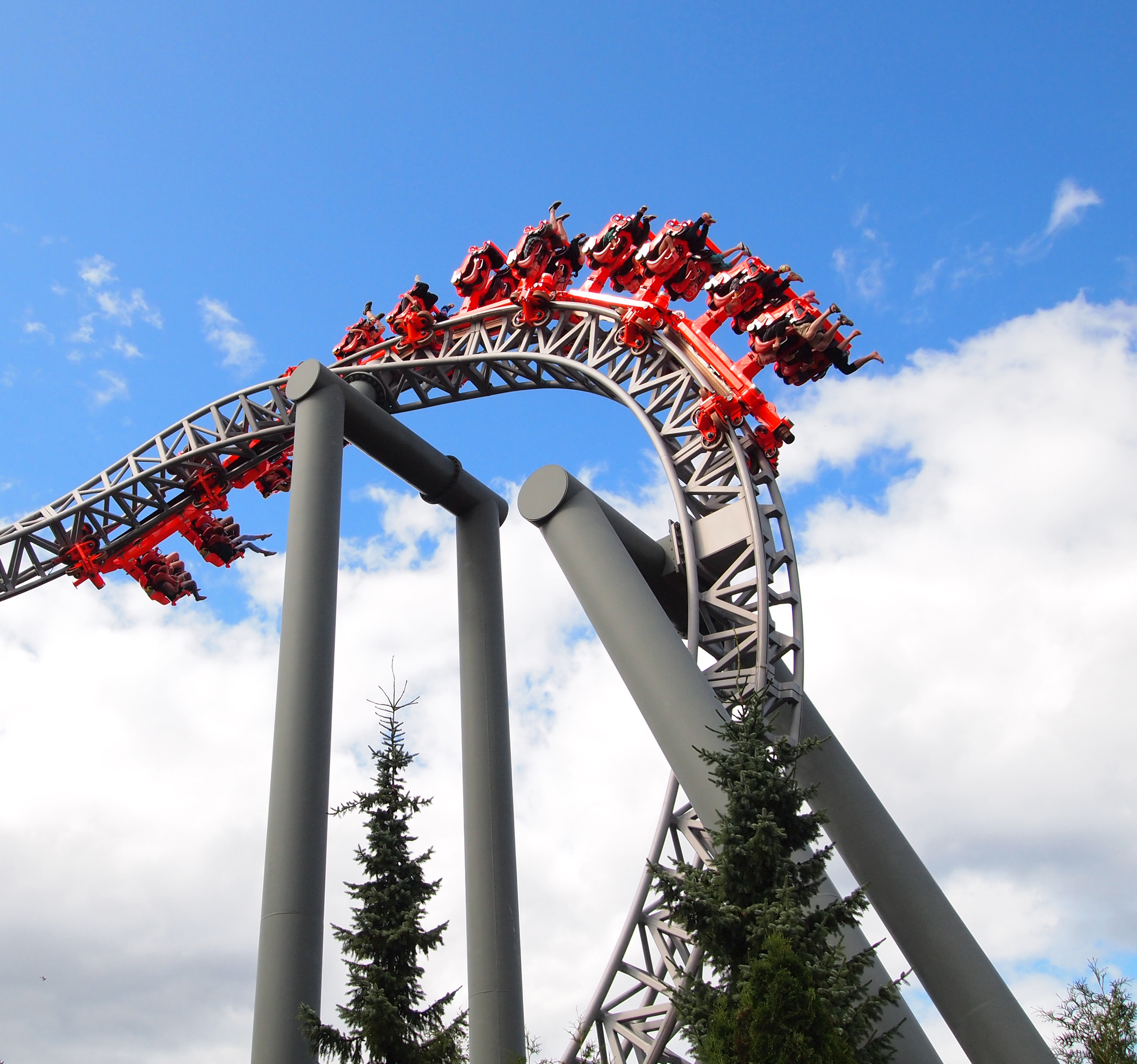
Tornado, located at Särkänniemi in Tampere, Pirkanmaa, Finland

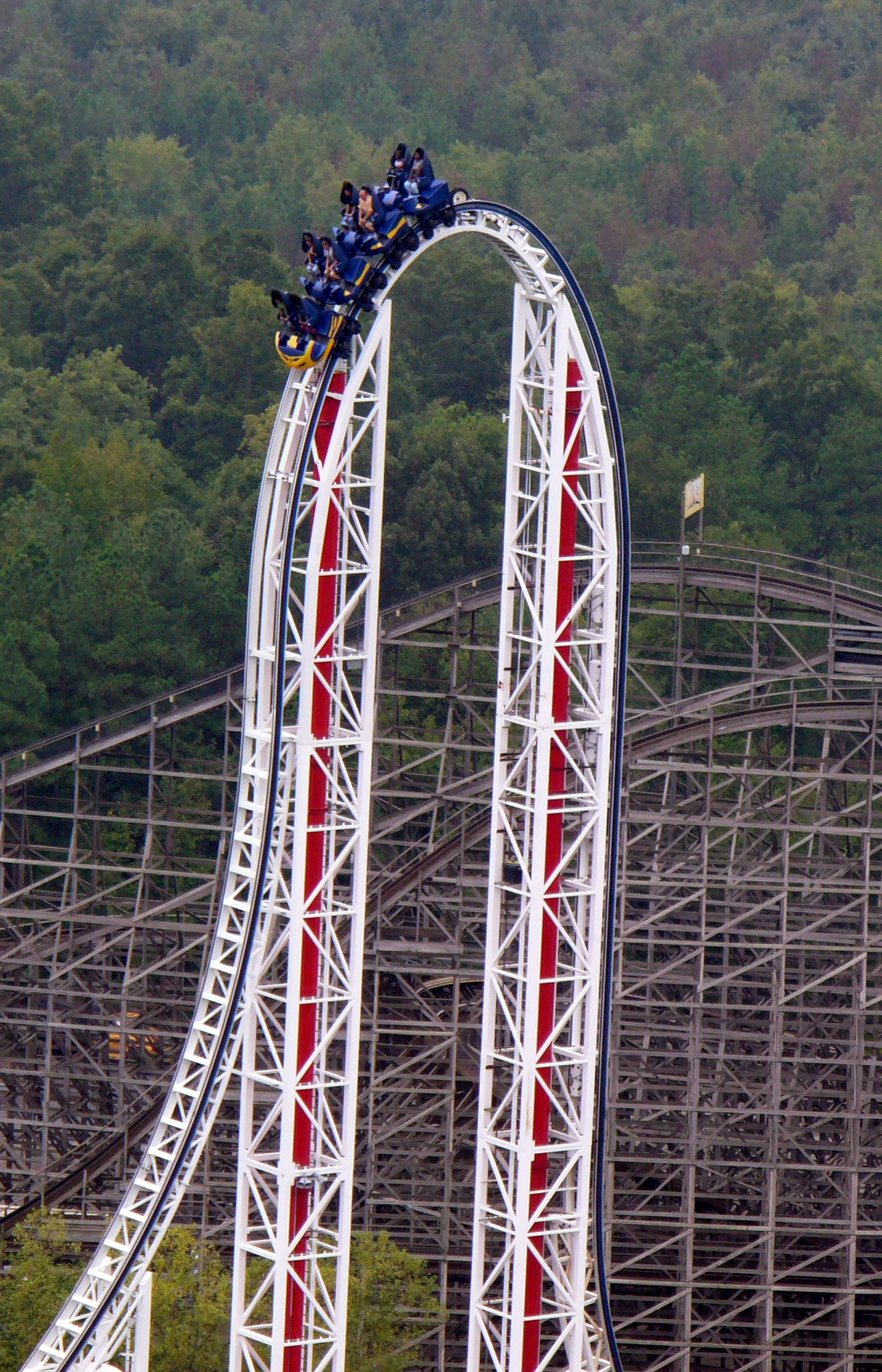
Hypersonic XLC, the world's first production Thrust Air 2000. (now defunct)

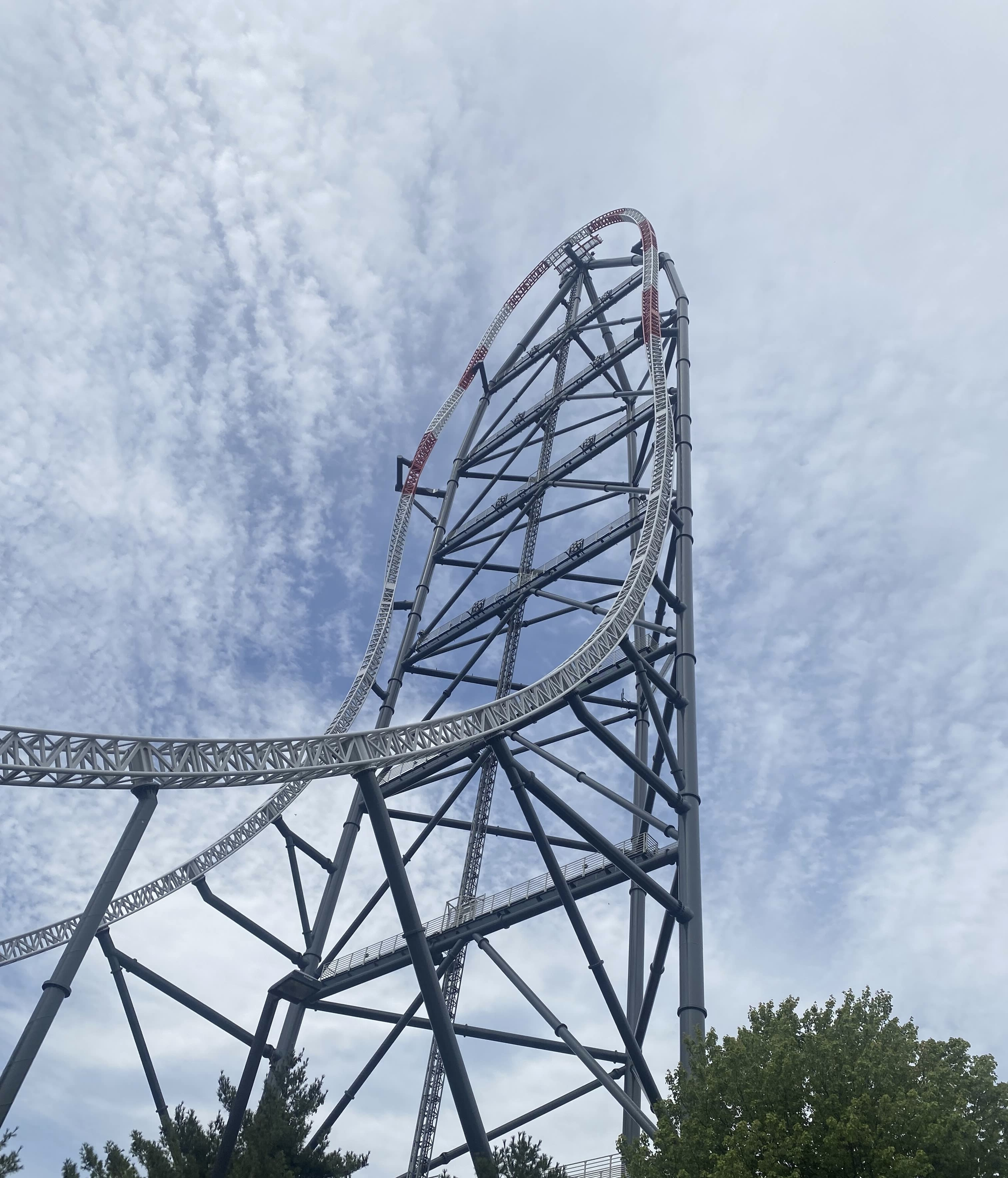
Top Thrill 2 (previously known as Top Thrill Dragster) at Cedar Point was the first strata coaster ever built.

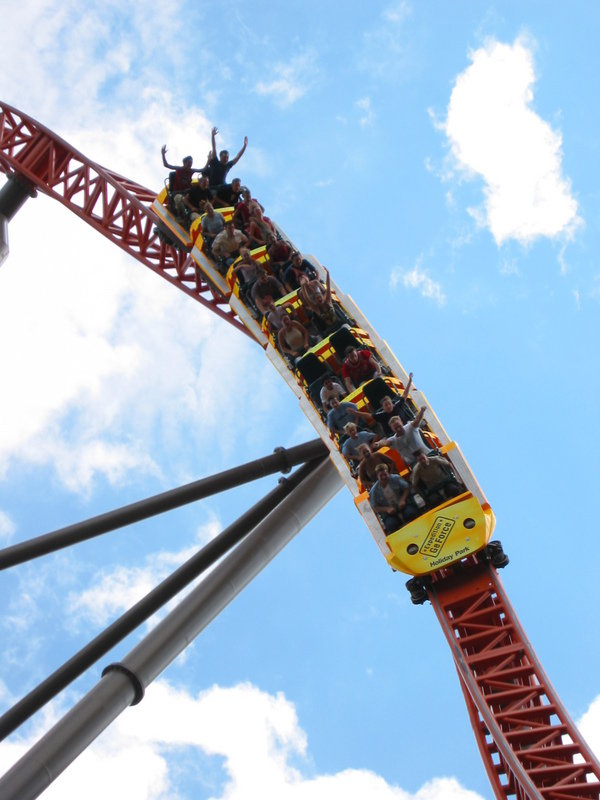
Expedition GeForce at Holiday Park, Germany

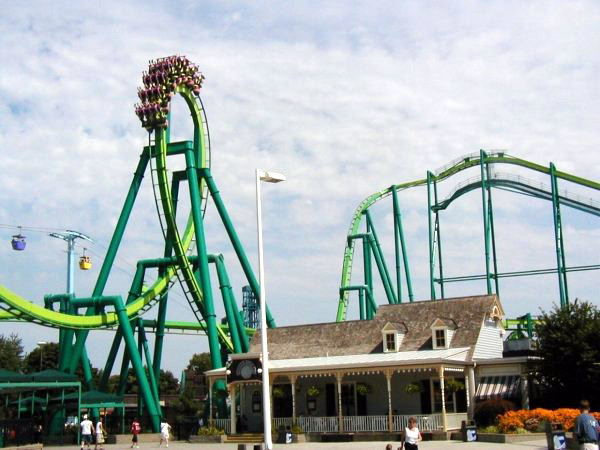
Raptor, a steel inverted coaster, is located at Cedar Point in Sandusky, Ohio, United States.

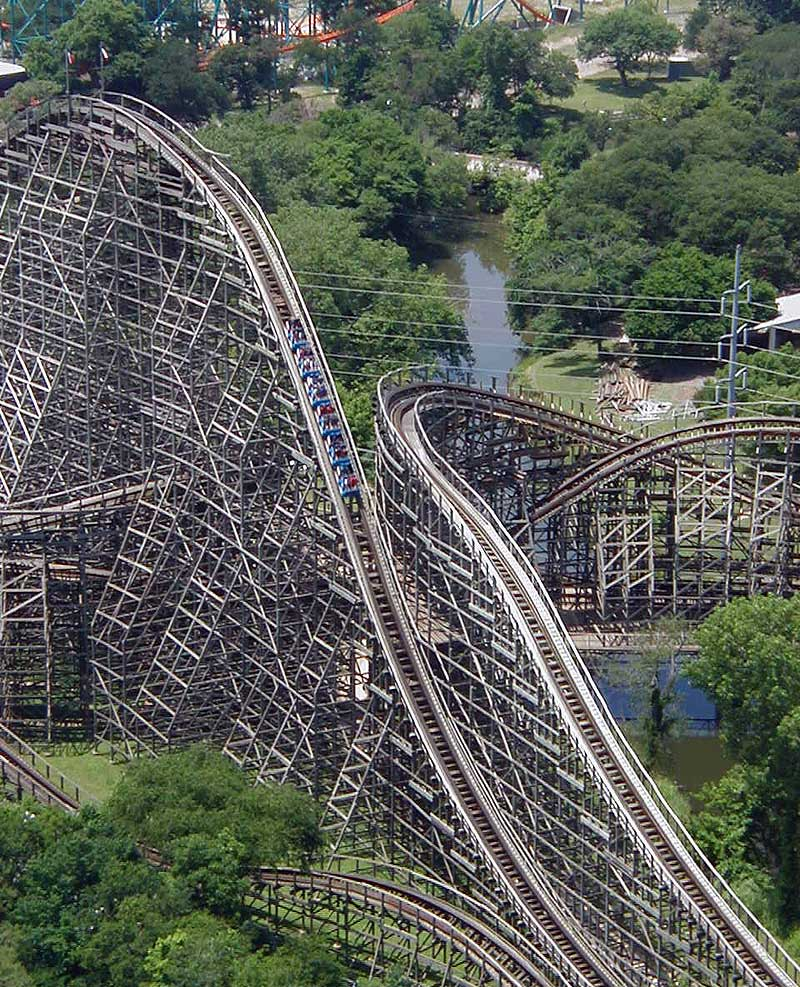
Texas Giant at Six Flags Over Texas before being refurbished into a hybrid steel-wood coaster New Texas Giant.

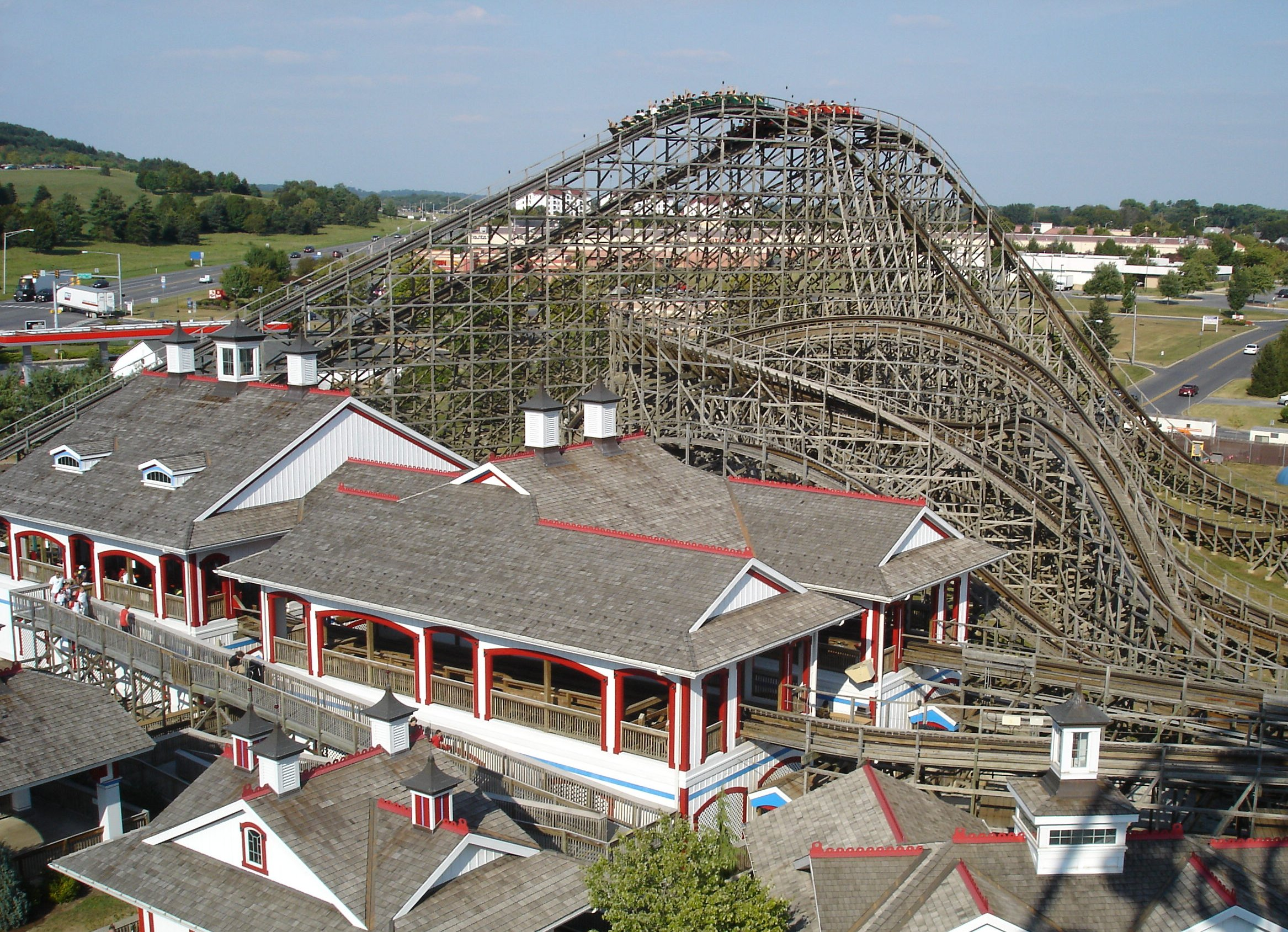
Lightning Racer at Hersheypark is a racing, dueling roller coaster made by GCI.

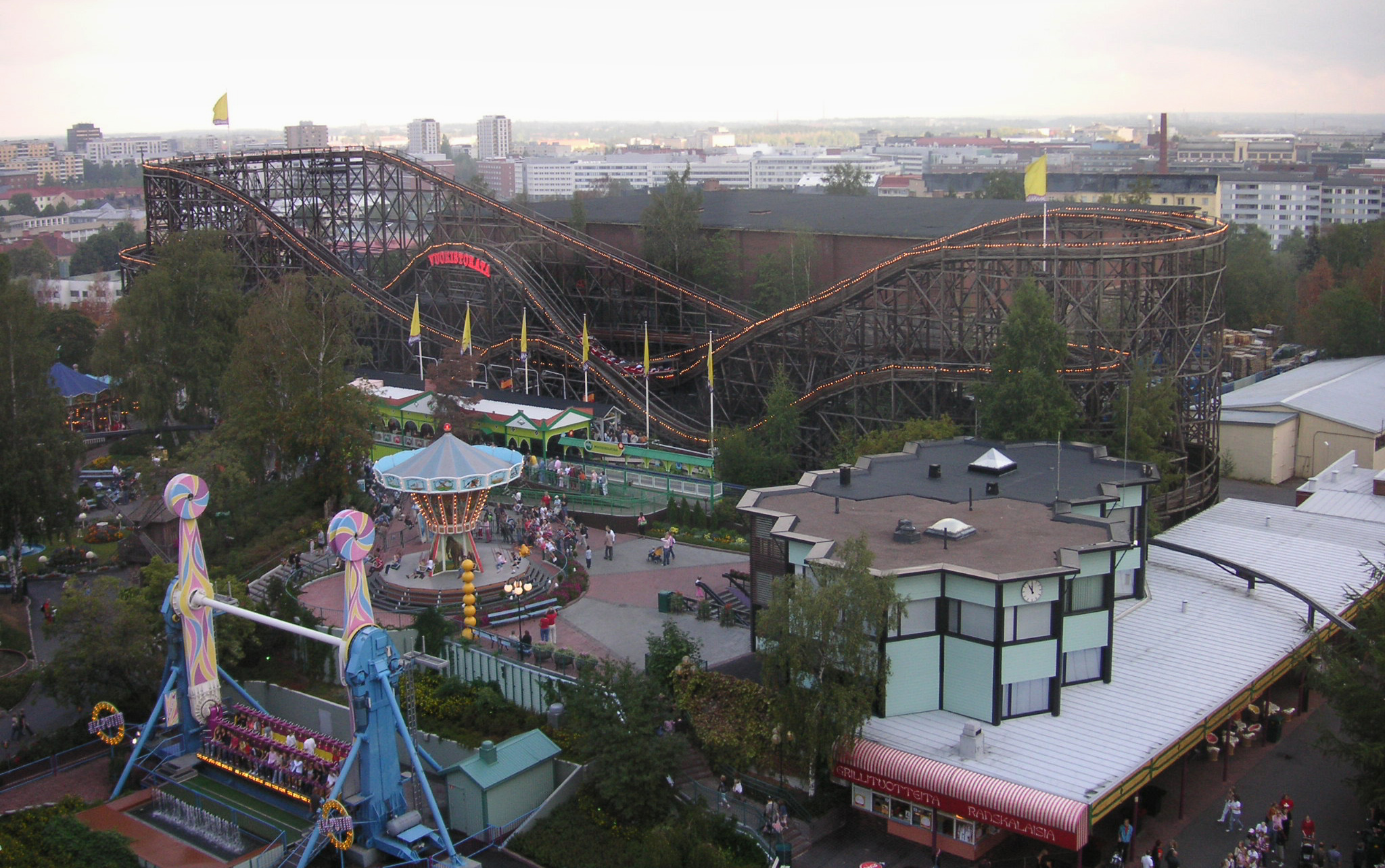
This all-wooden roller coaster, built in 1951, dominates the Linnanmäki amusement park in Helsinki, Finland.

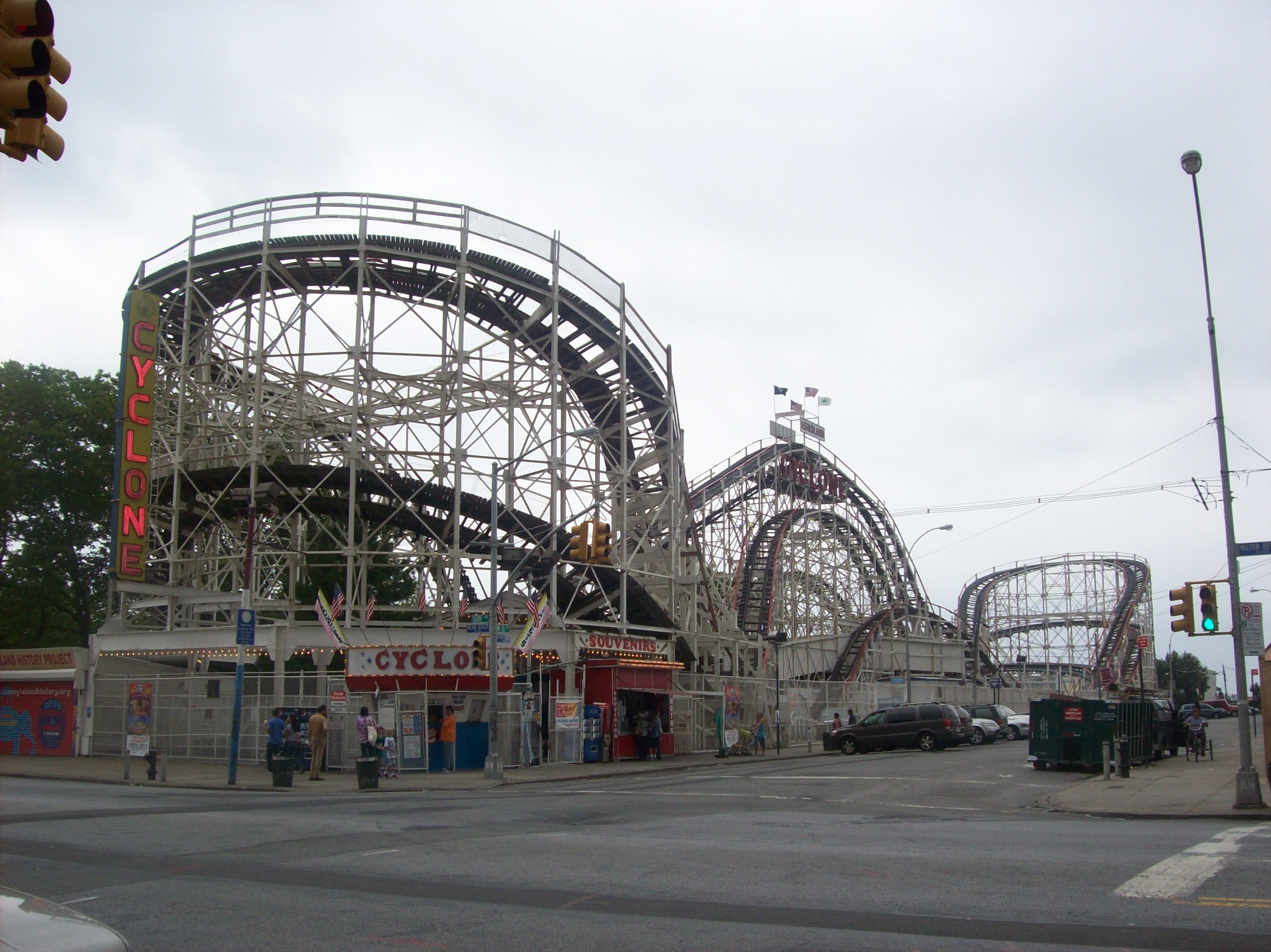
Coney Island Cyclone in Brooklyn, New York was built in 1927 and refurbished in 1975.

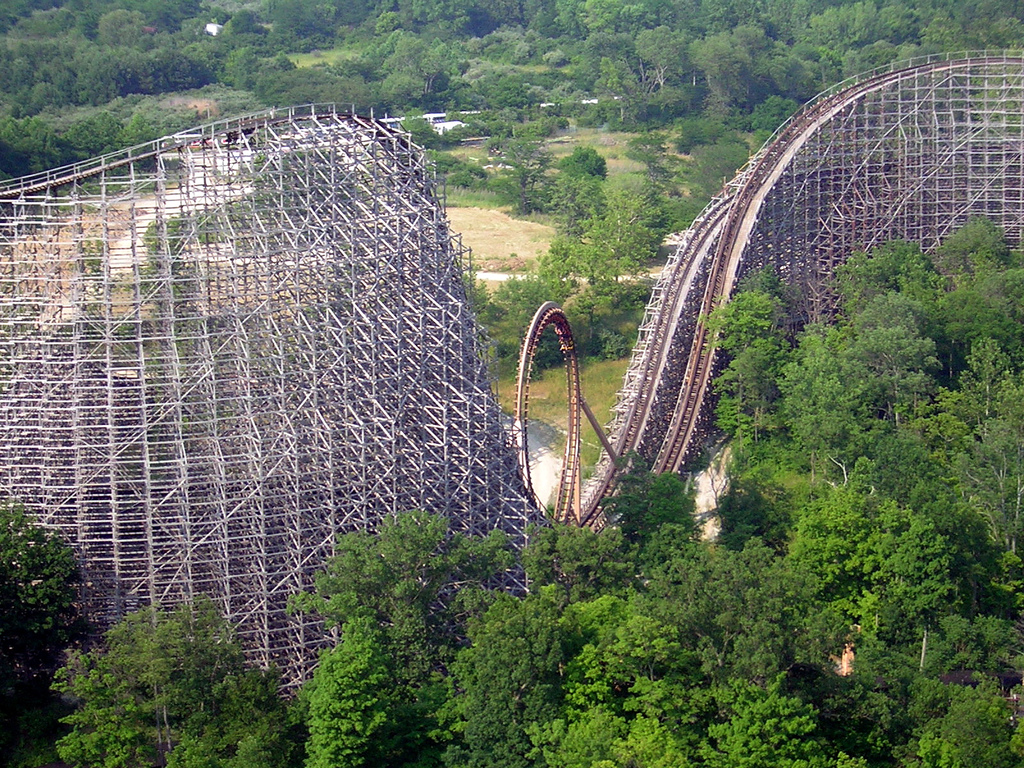
Son of Beast in Kings Island was the only wooden coaster to have a vertical loop and the only wooden hypercoaster.

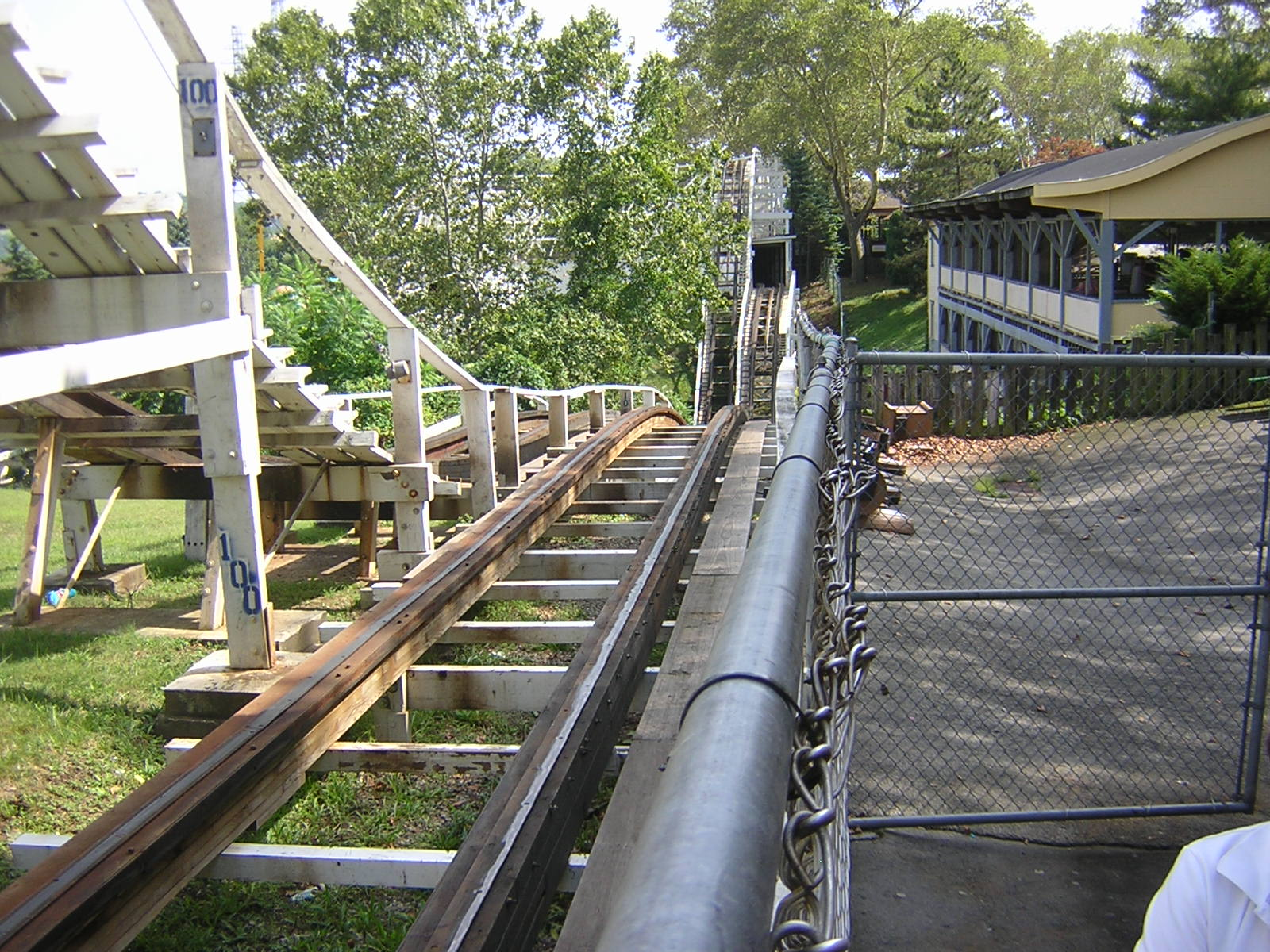
Jack Rabbit at Kennywood Park outside of Pittsburgh, Pennsylvania, United States was built in 1920.

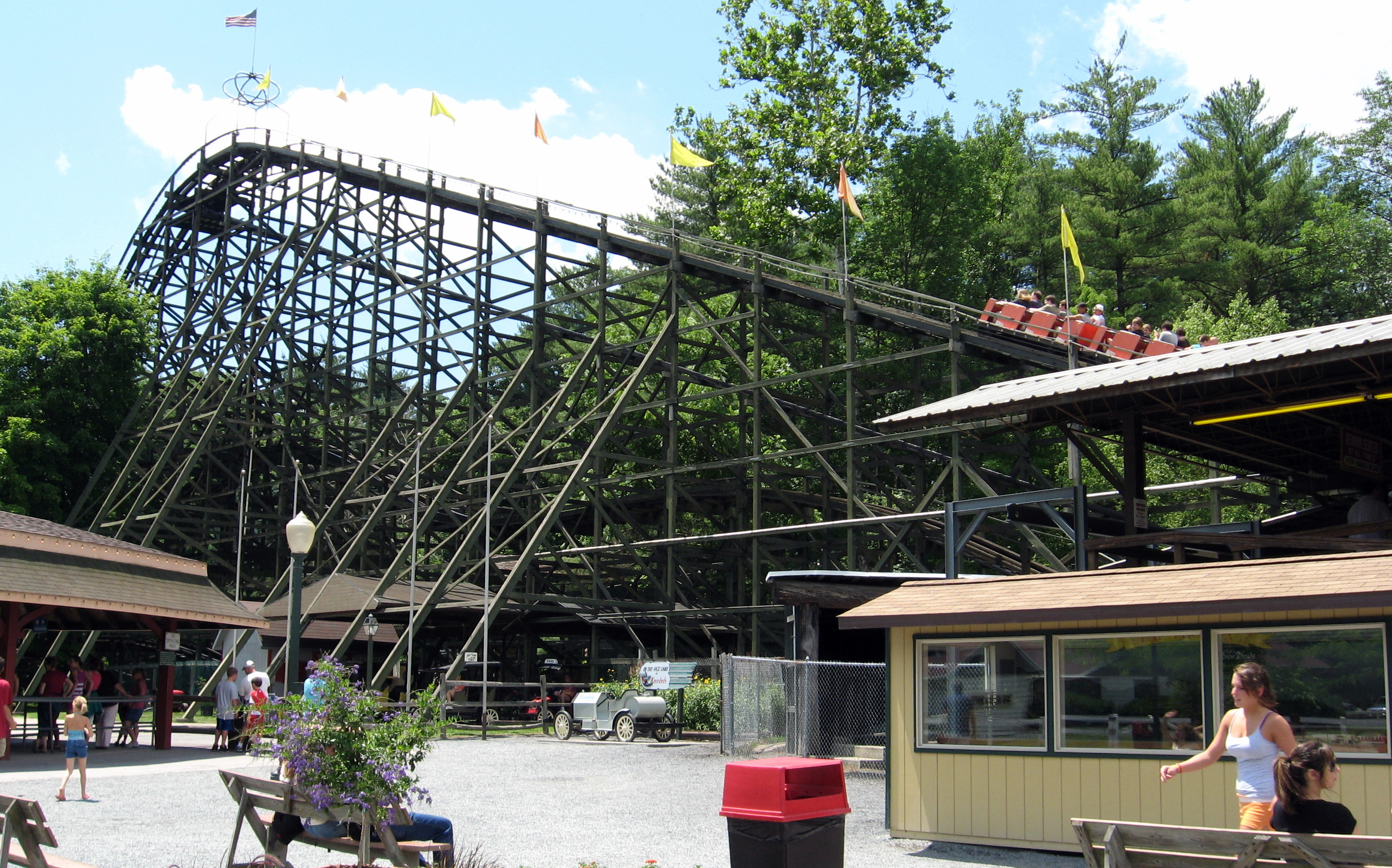
Phoenix, built in 1947, at Knoebels Amusement Resort in Elysburg, Pennsylvania, United States.

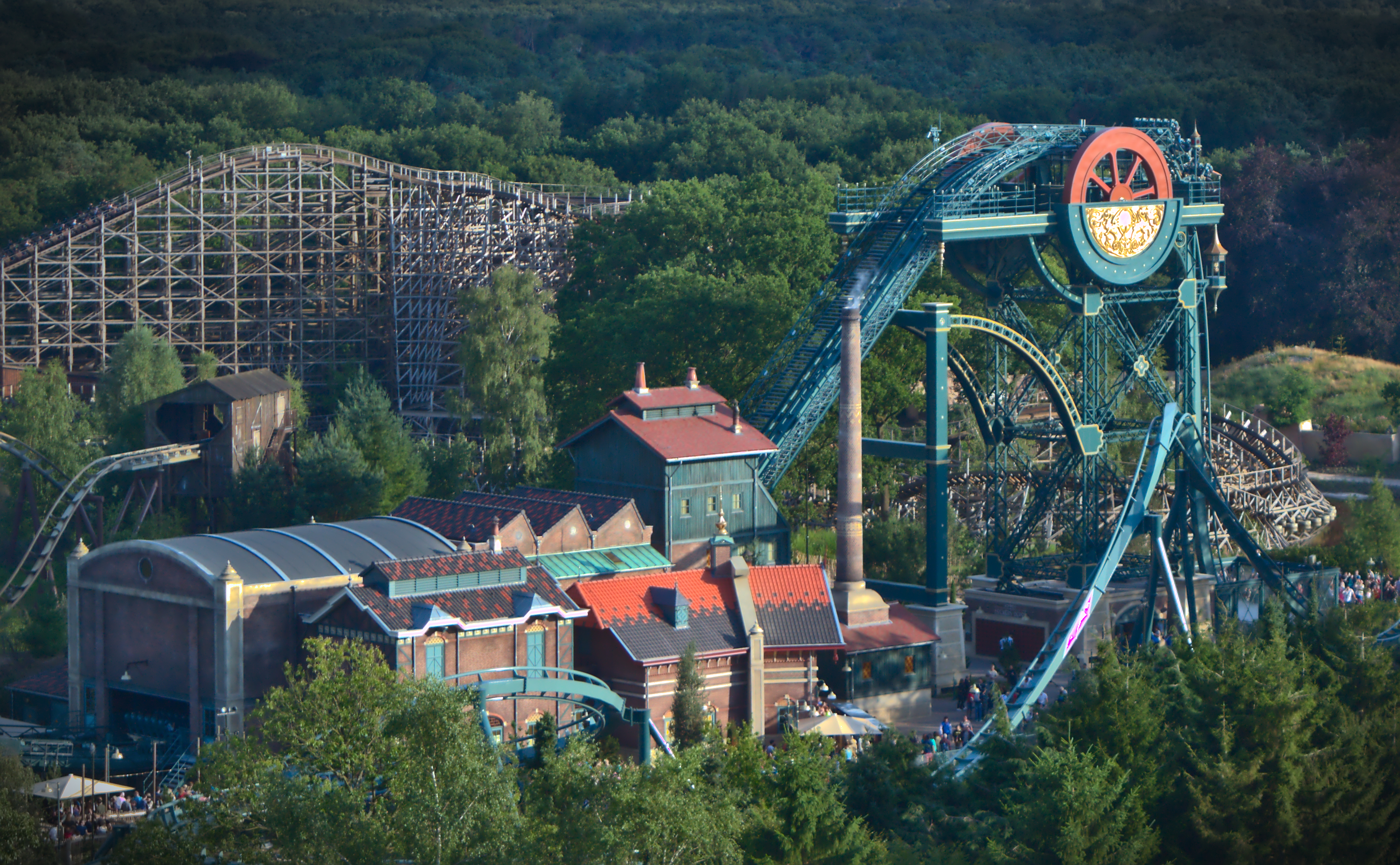
Baron 1898 at Efteling in Kaatsheuvel, The Netherlands

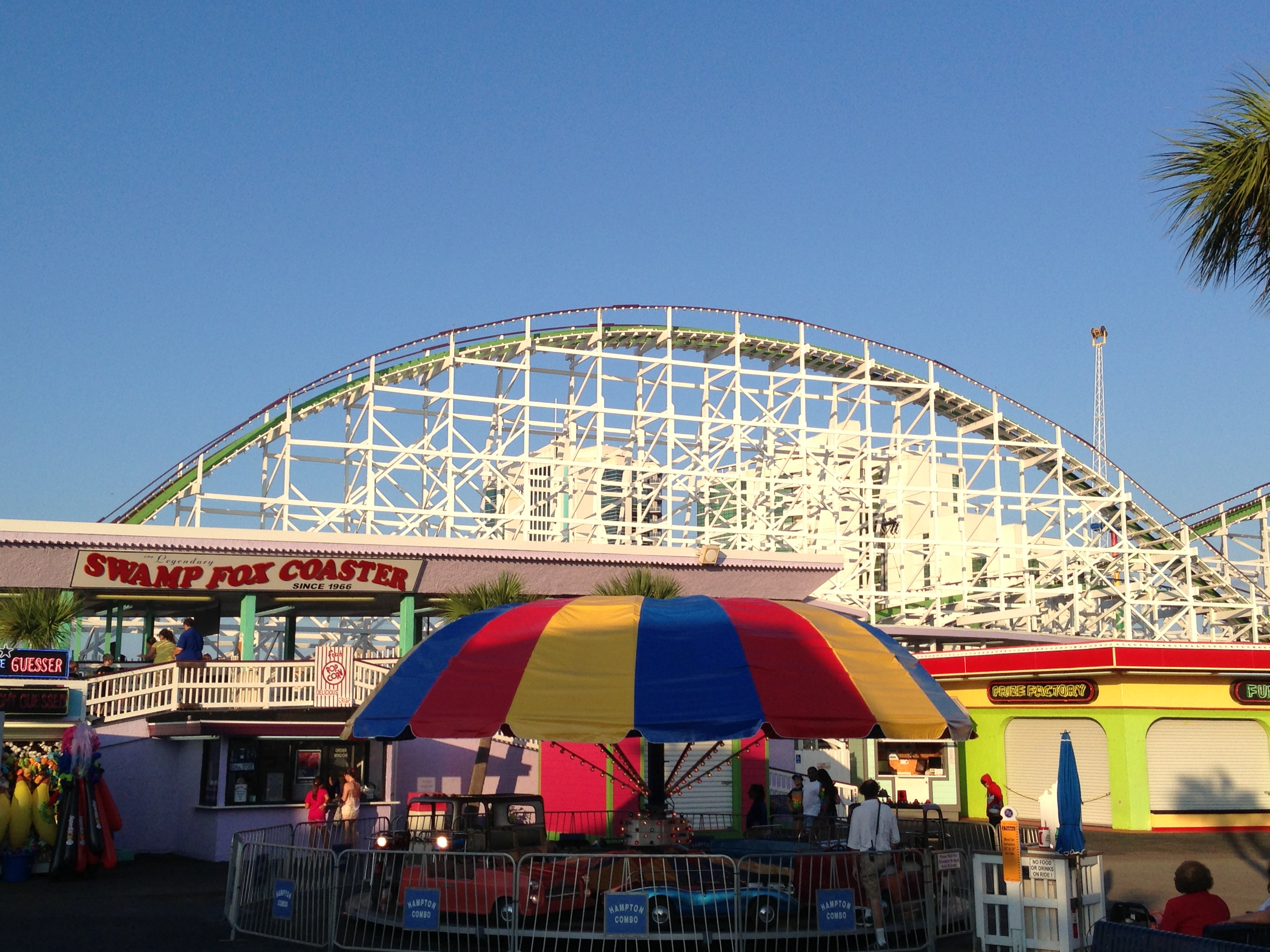
Swamp Fox at Family Kingdom in Mrytle Beach, South Carolina.

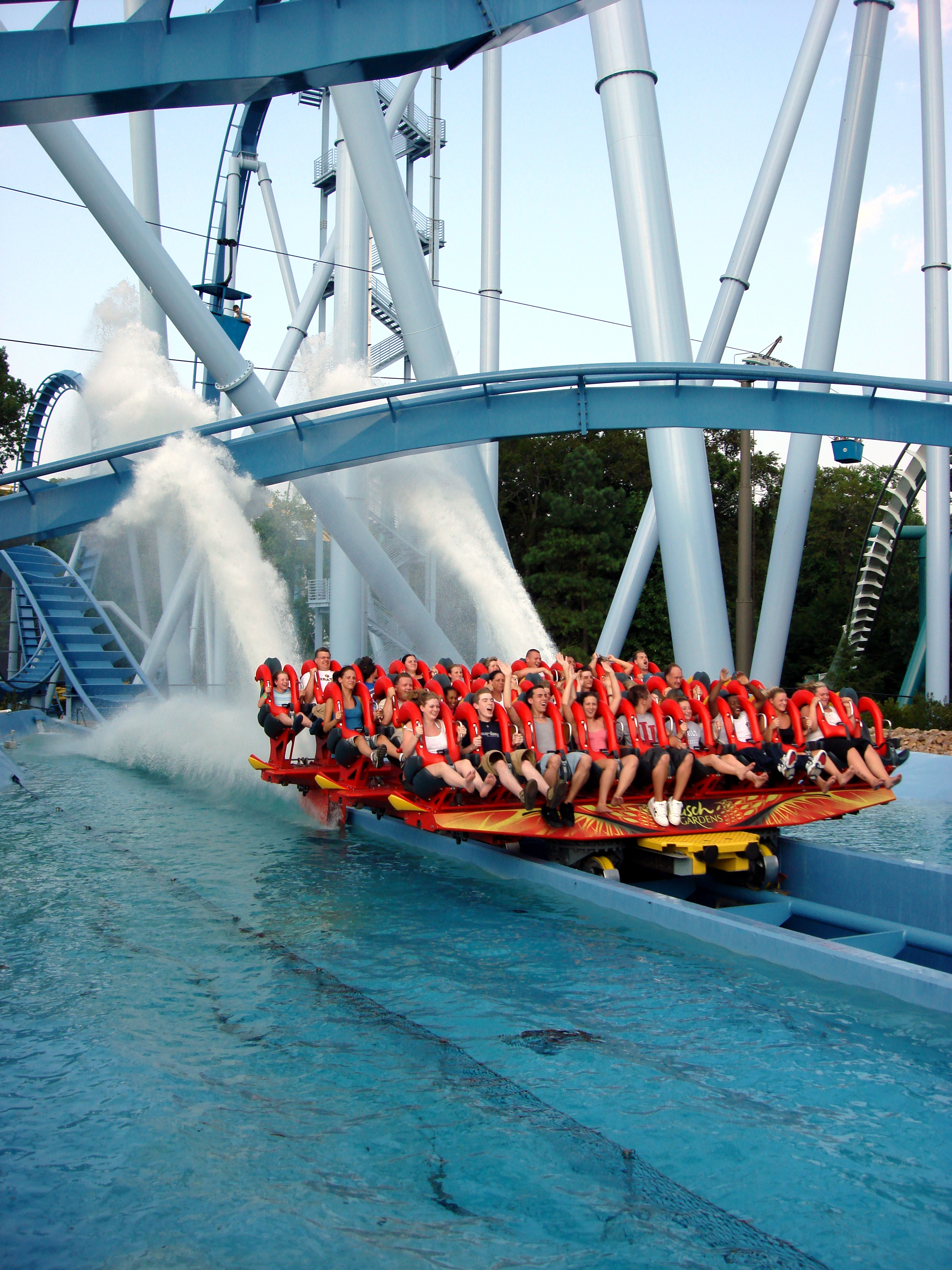
Griffon splashing down into a pool at Busch Gardens Williamsburg, US.

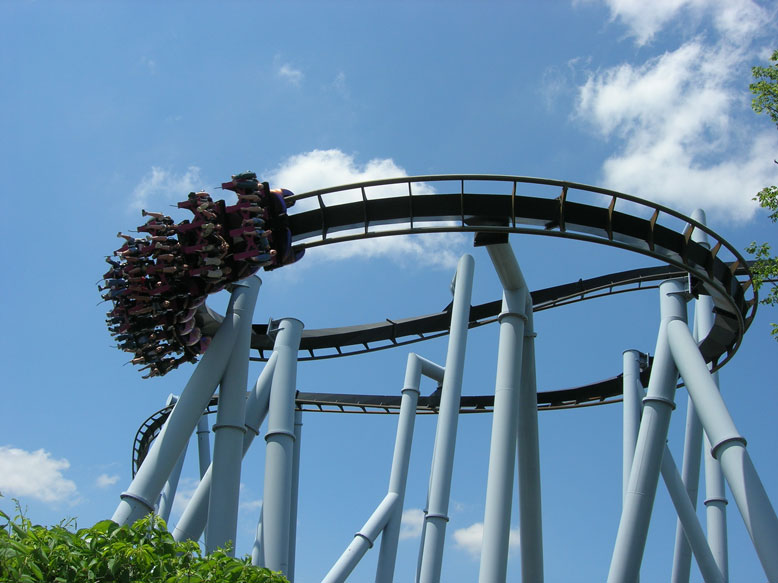
Great Bear is the first steel inverted coaster in Pennsylvania, located at Hersheypark.

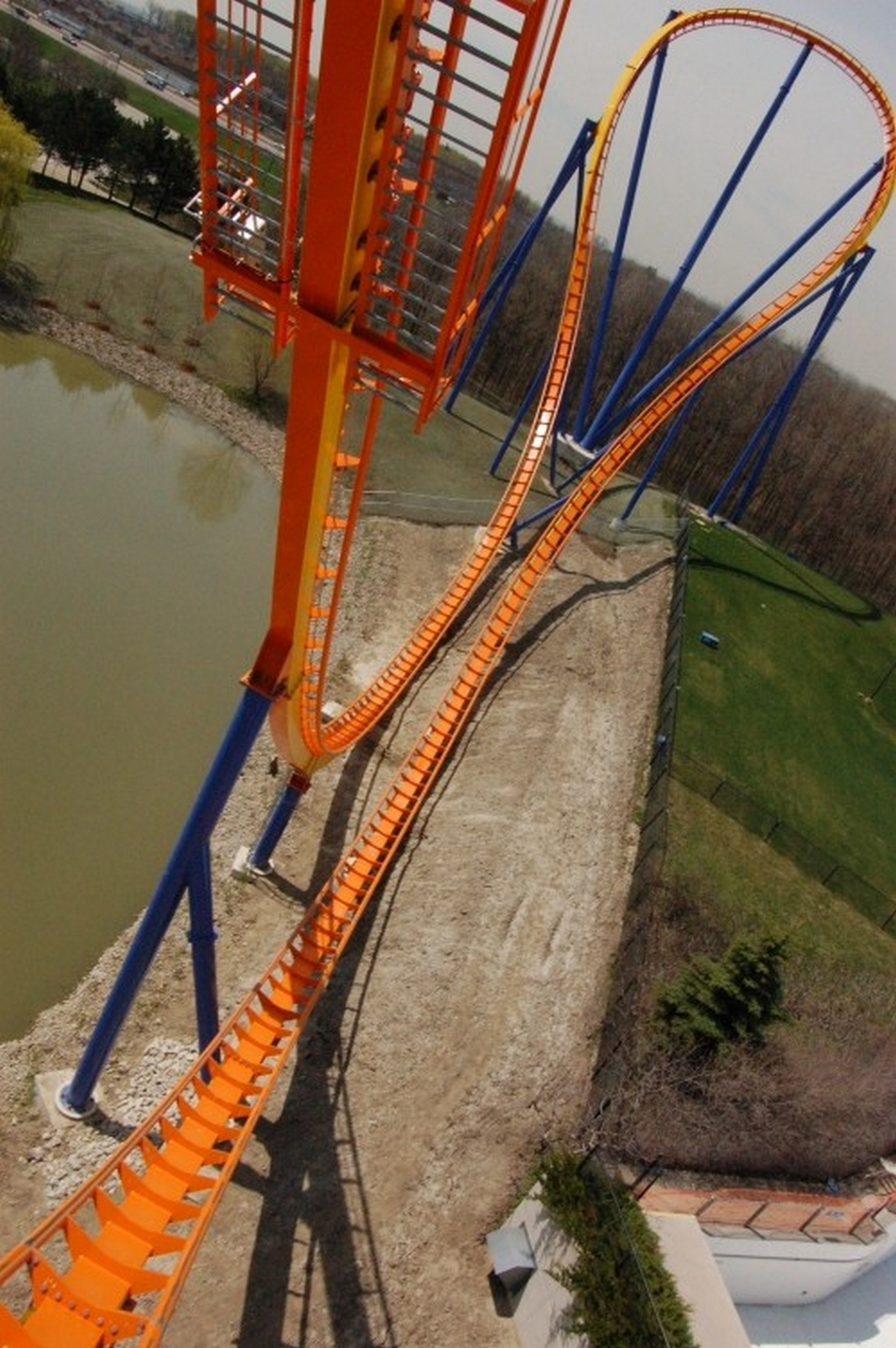
Behemoth, at Canada's Wonderland, at one point the highest and fastest coaster in Canada

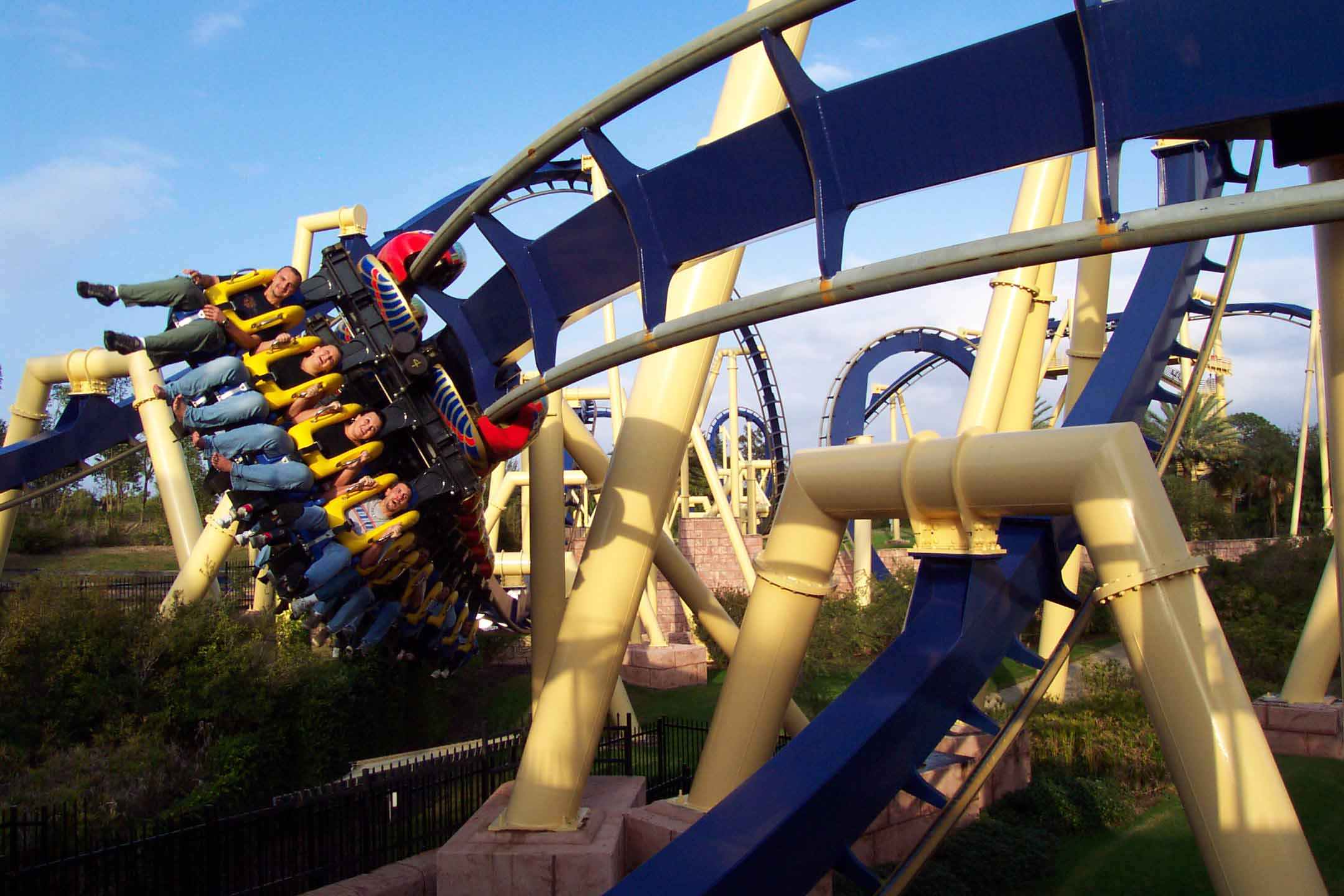
"Montu", a popular inverted roller coaster at Busch Gardens Tampa Bay, US

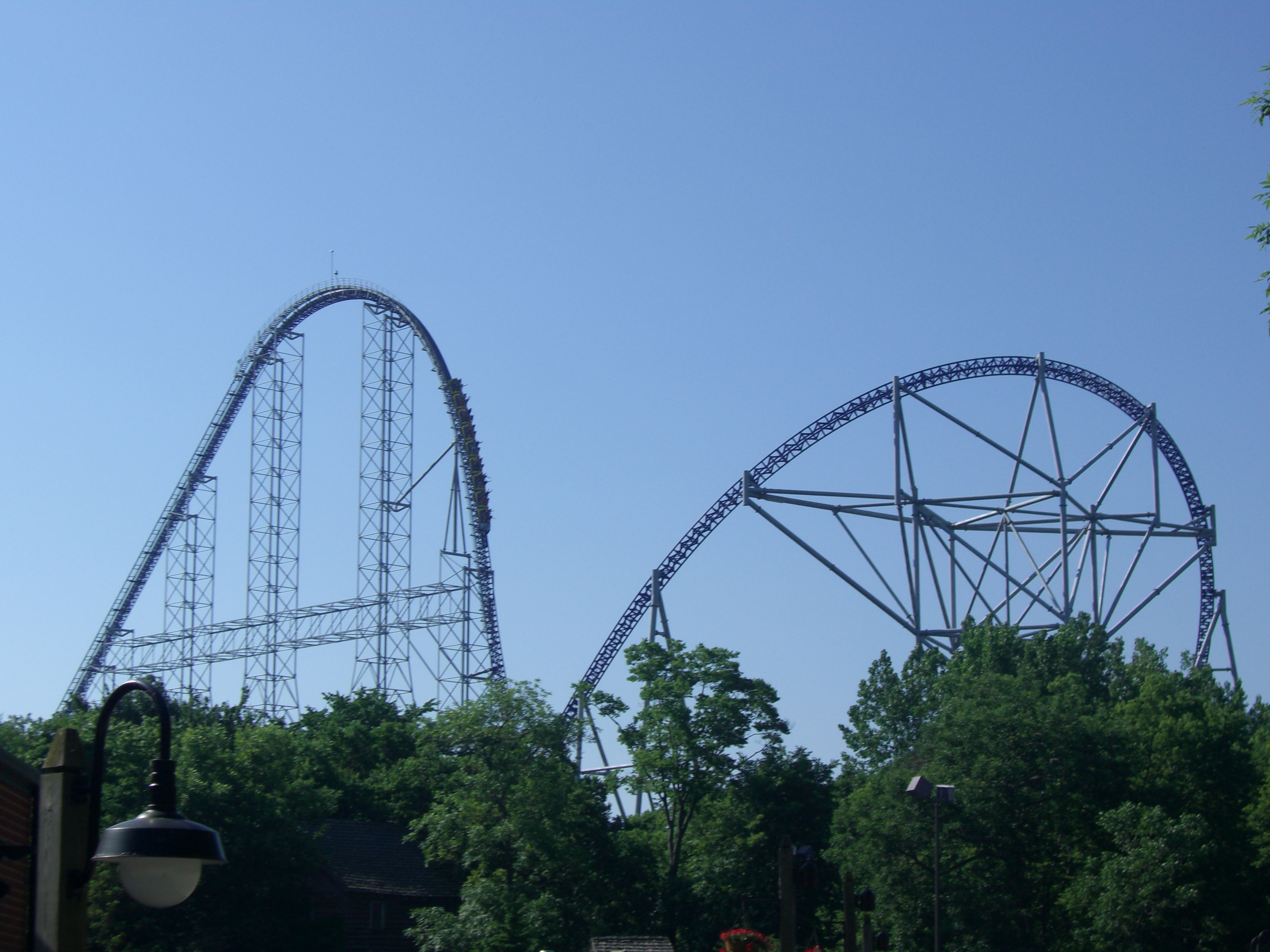
Millennium Force at Cedar Point, the first giga coaster

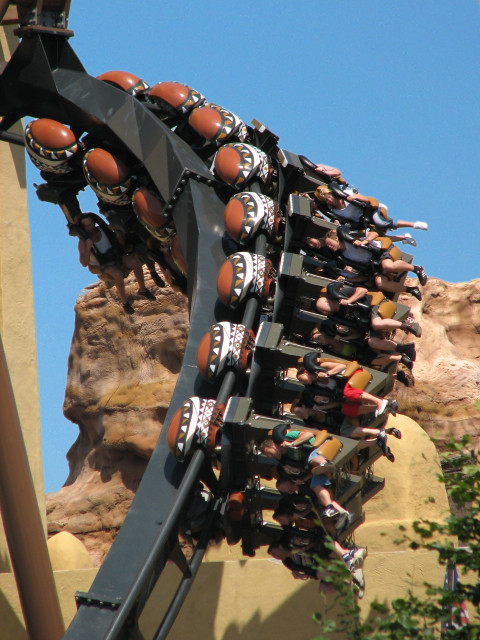
Black Mamba at Phantasialand, Germany

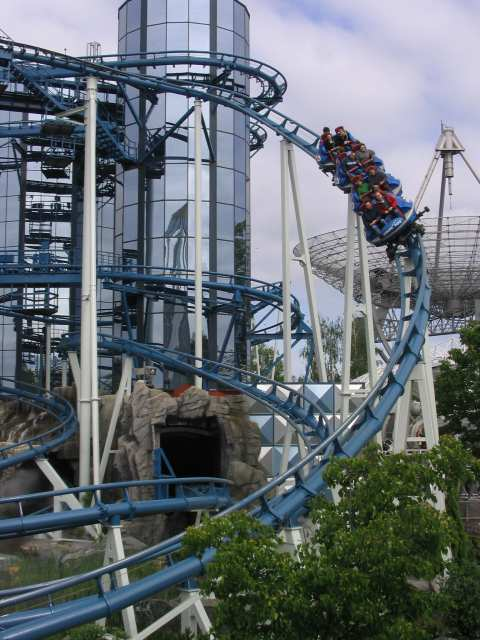
Euro-Mir, a spinning roller coaster at Europa-Park in Rust, Germany

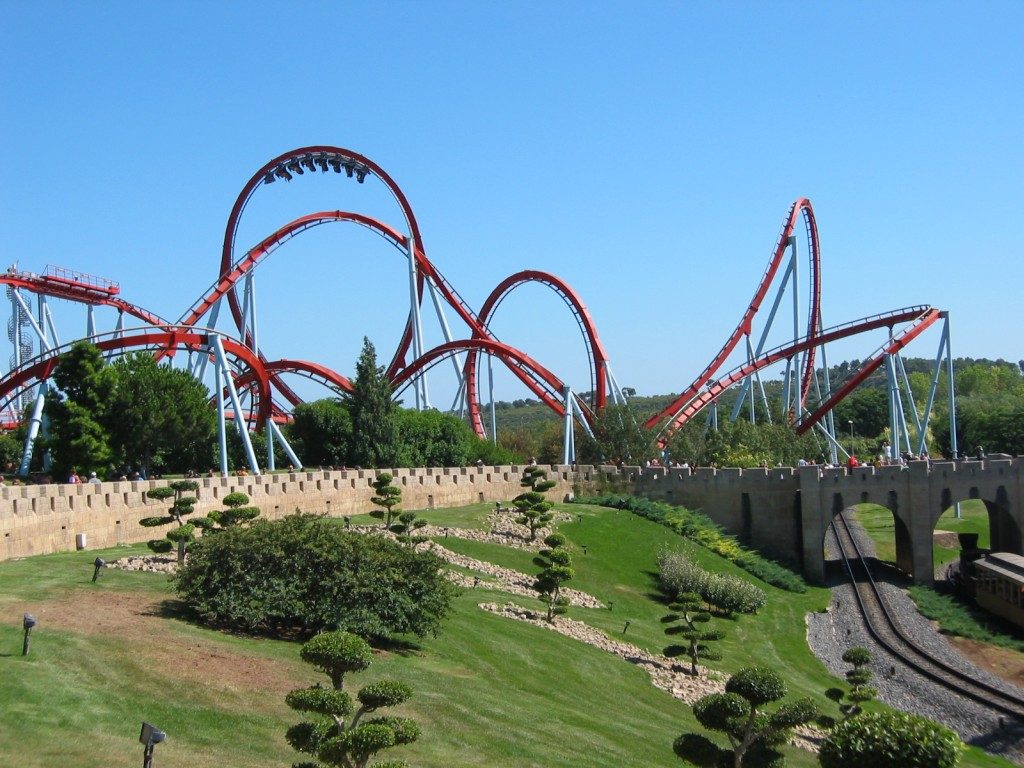
Dragon Khan at PortAventura Park in Salou (Tarragona), Spain

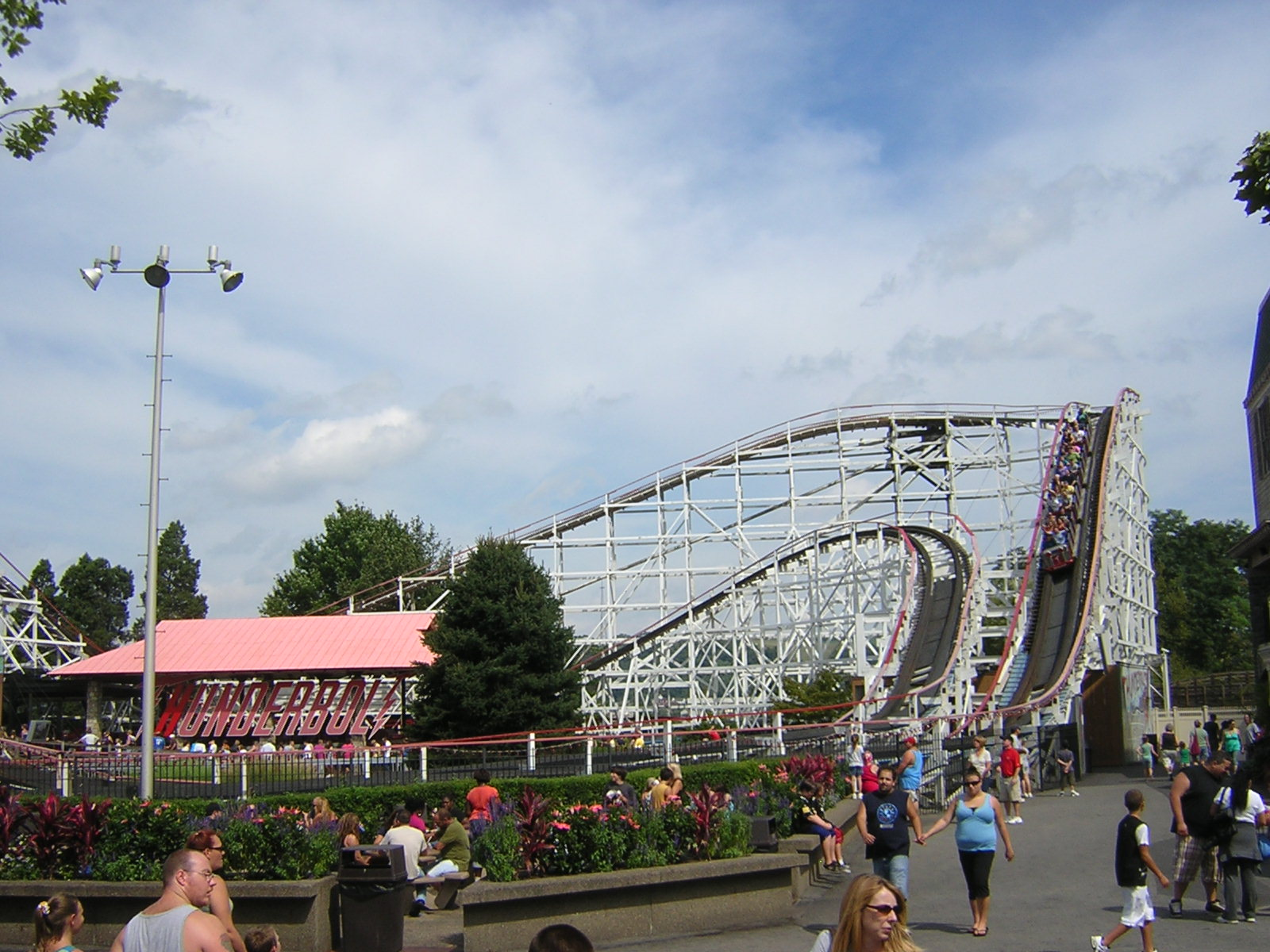
Thunderbolt at Kennywood outside of Pittsburgh, Pennsylvania, US was built in 1968.

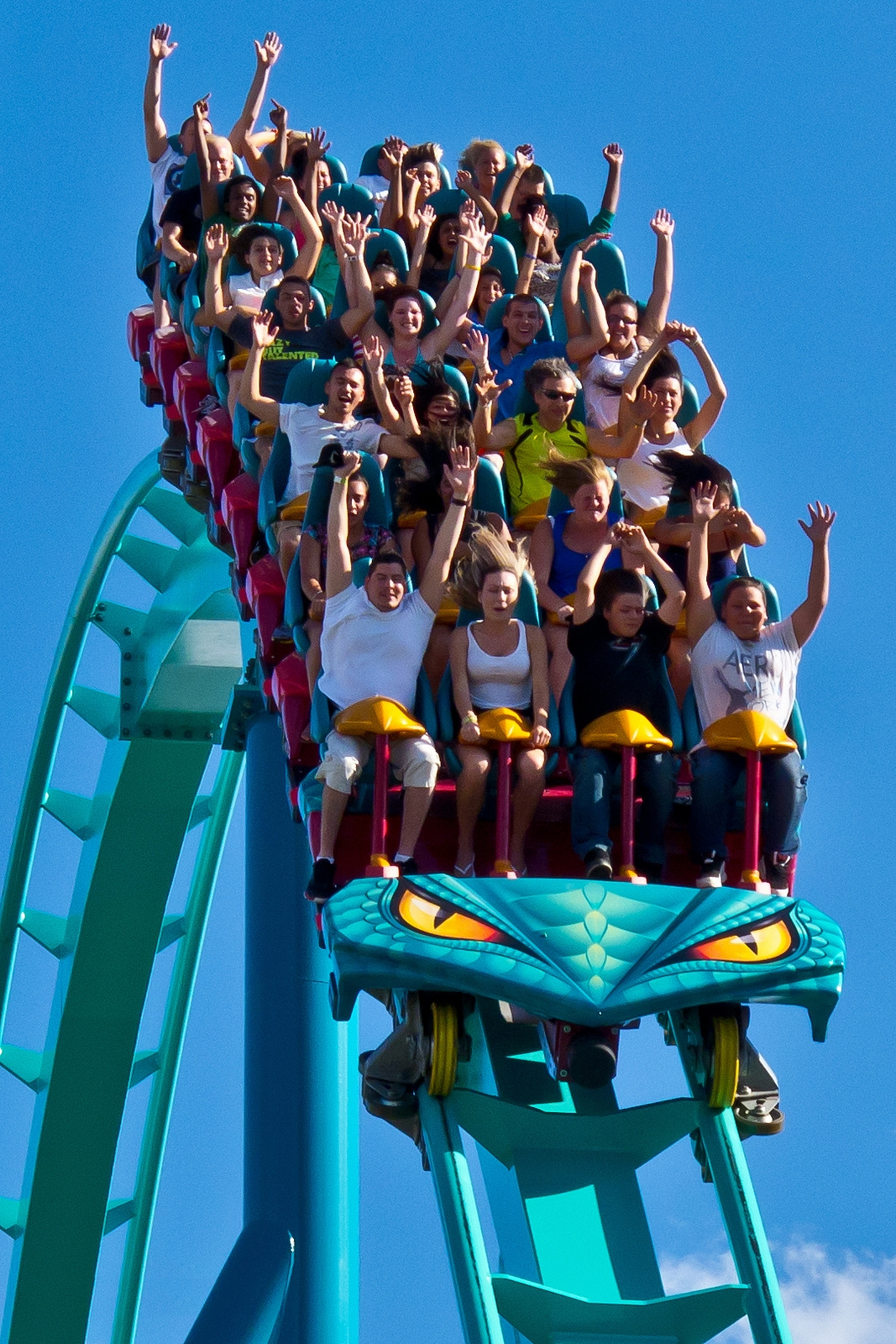
Leviathan at Canada's Wonderland, the tallest coaster in Canada (93 m or 306 ft, 148 km/h or 92 mph)

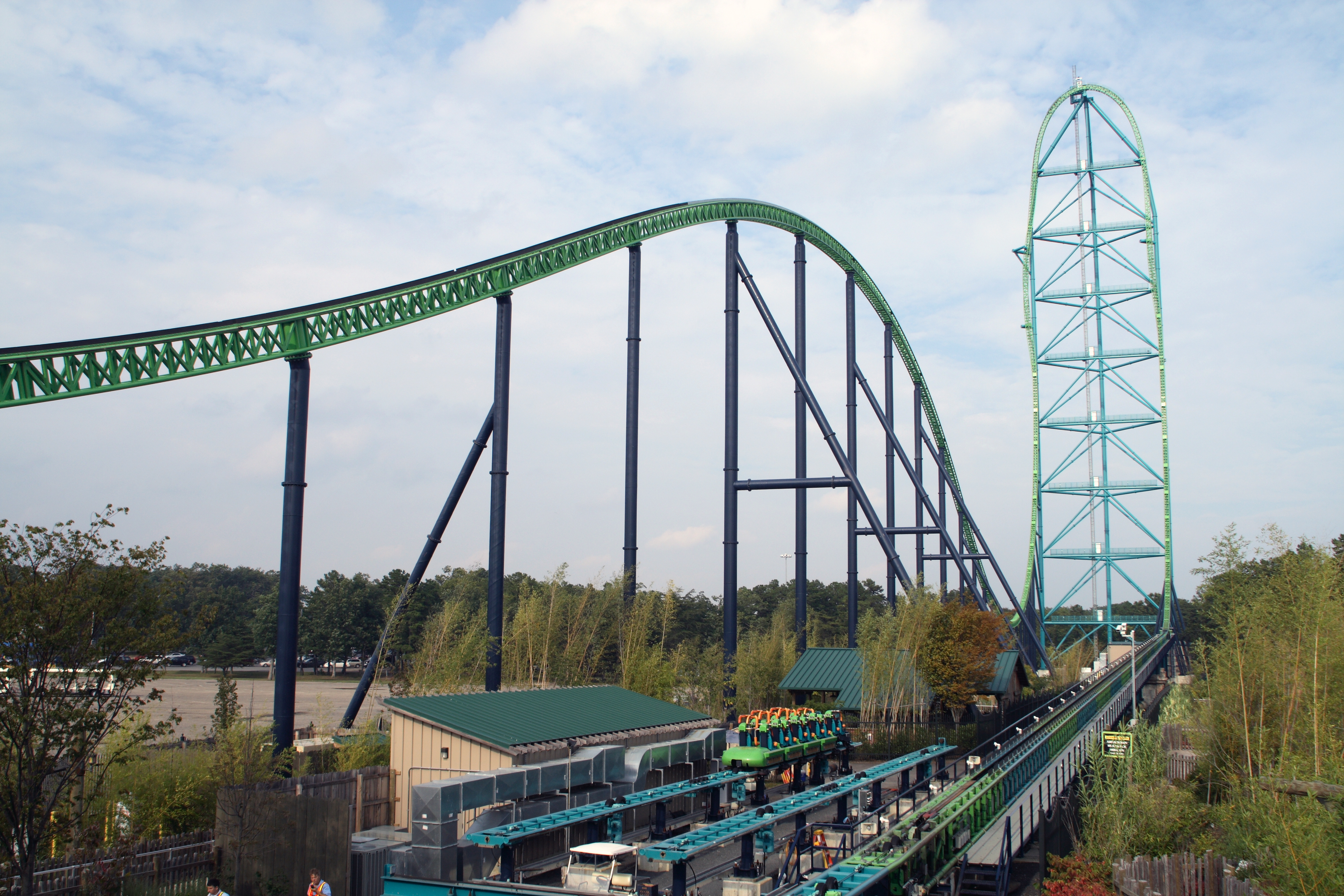
Kingda Ka at Six Flags Great Adventure was the world's tallest roller coaster and was the second strata coaster in the world after Top Thrill Dragster.

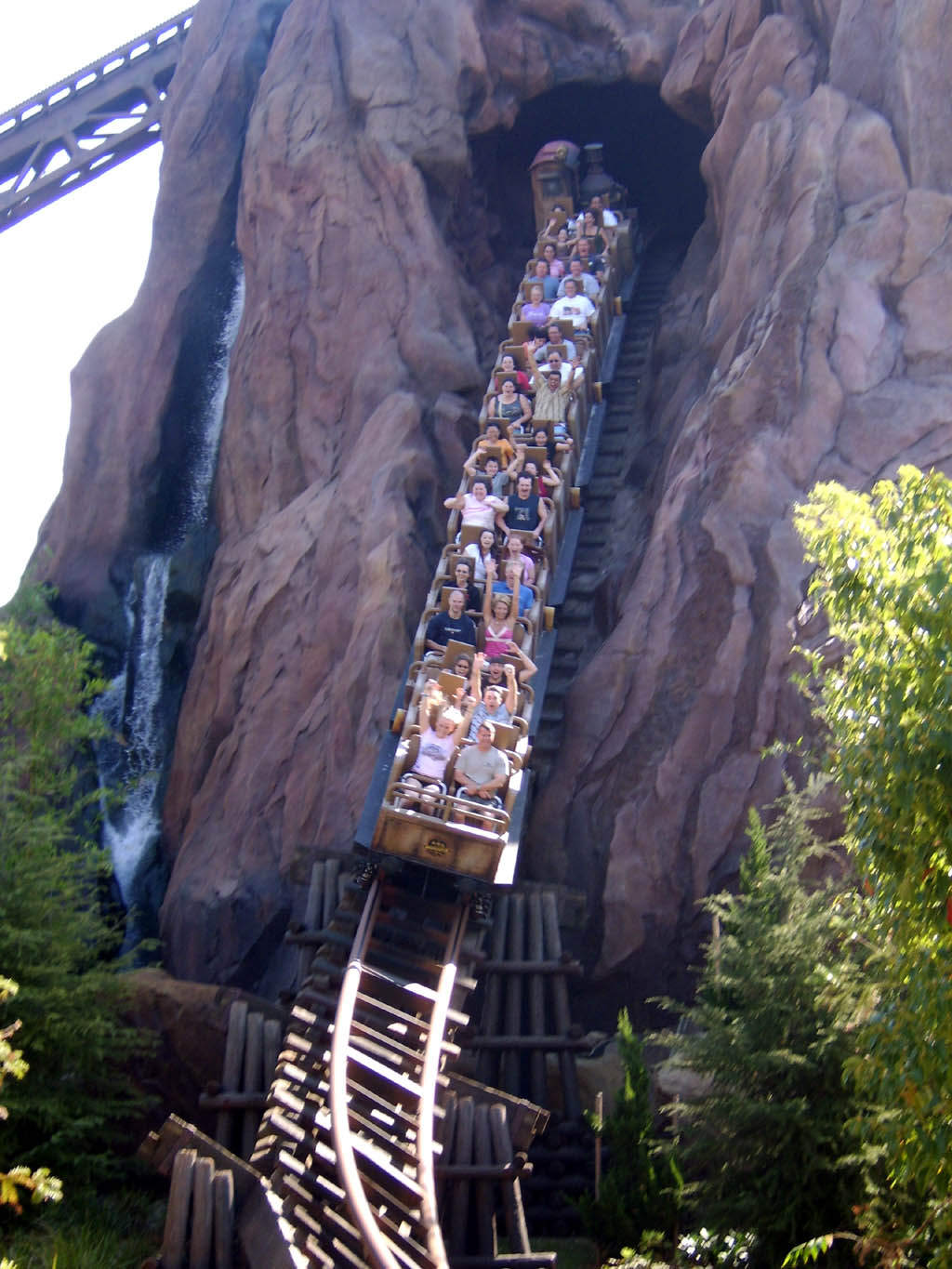
Expedition Everest, a roller coaster at Disney's Animal Kingdom in Walt Disney World

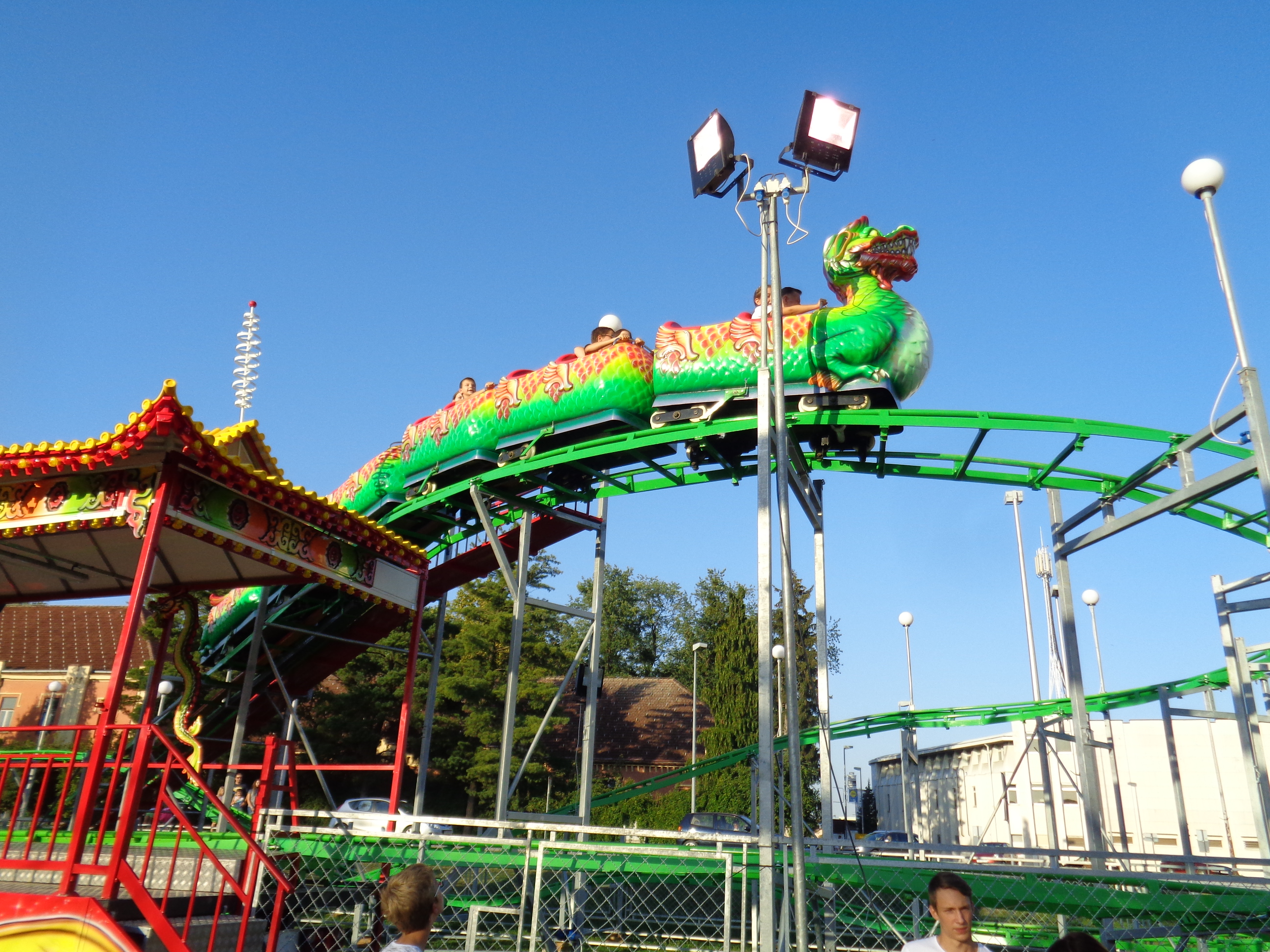
A small roller coaster at a local festival in Čakovec, Croatia

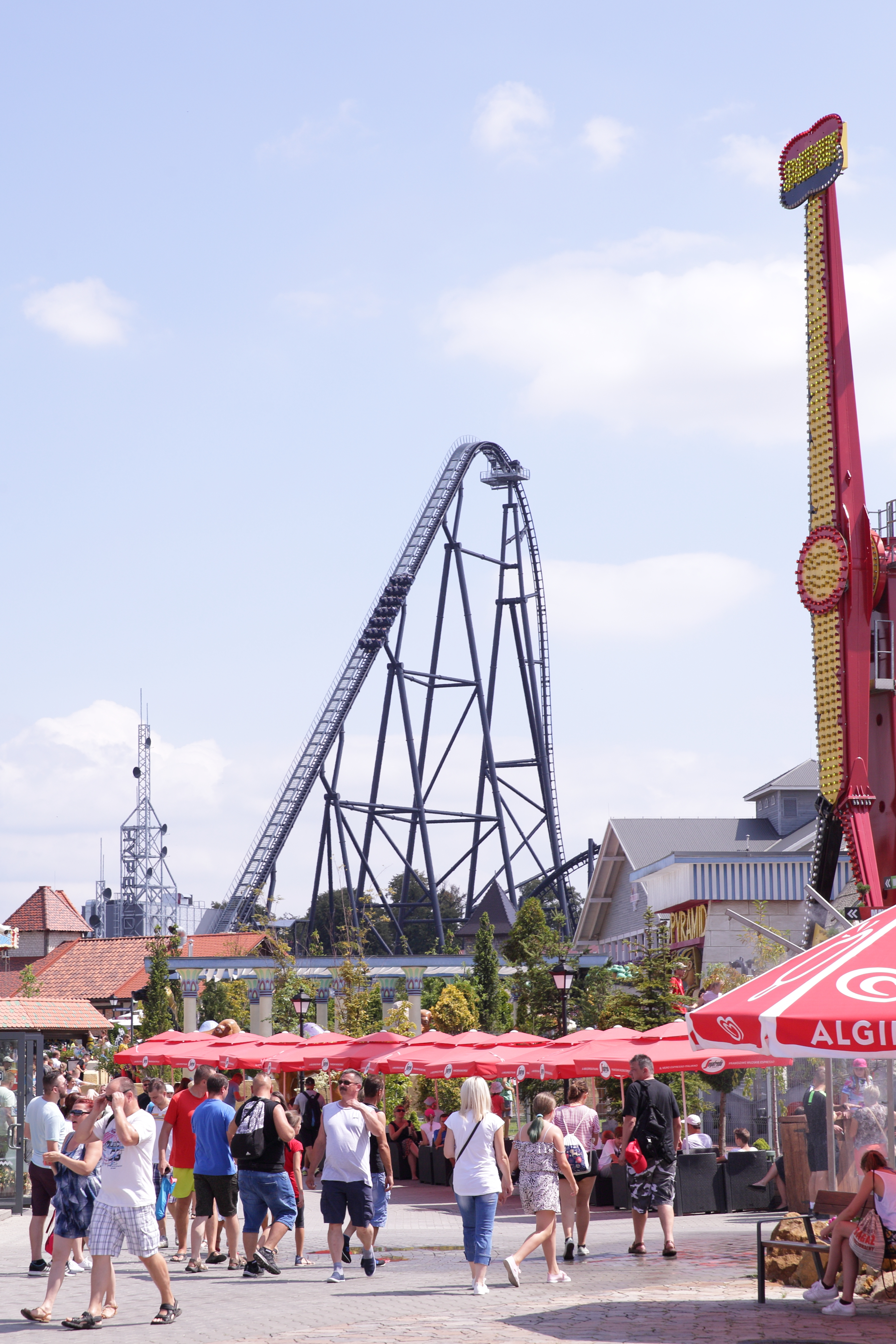
Hyperion at Energylandia in Zator, Lesser Poland Voivodeship, Poland

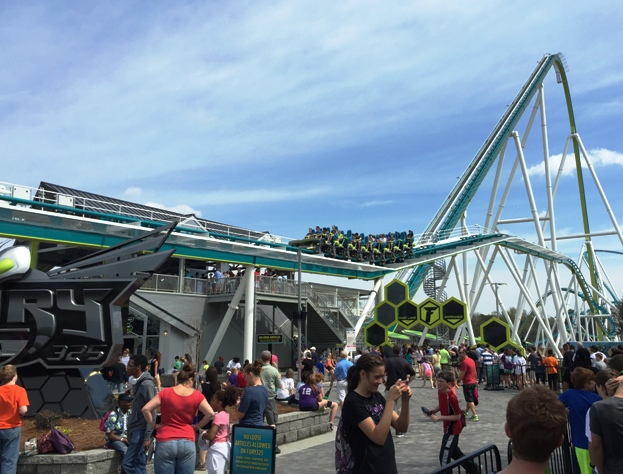
Fury 325 at Carowinds is the tallest roller coaster to use a traditional chain lift.

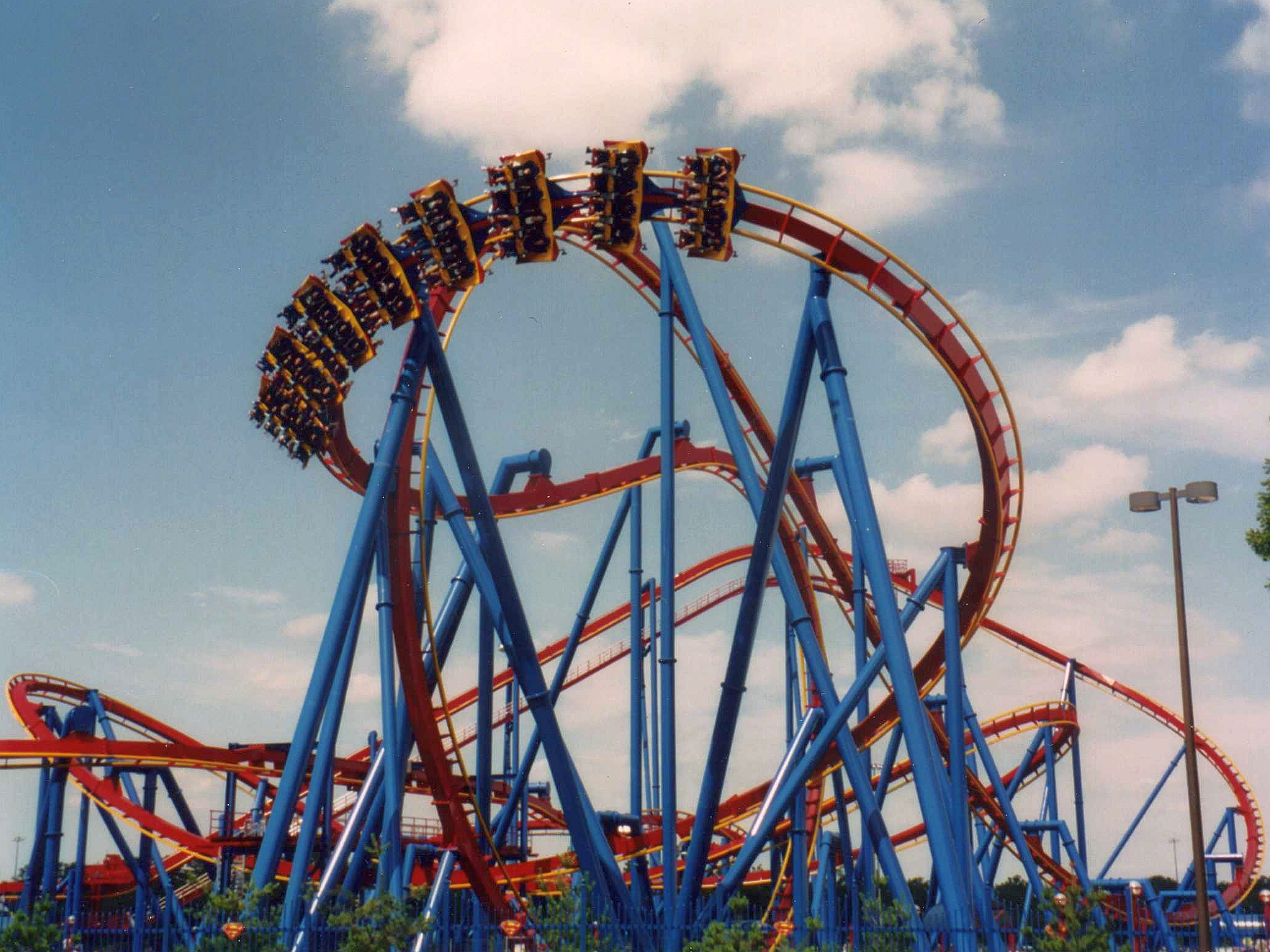
Superman: Ultimate Flight, a flying coaster at Six Flags Great Adventure

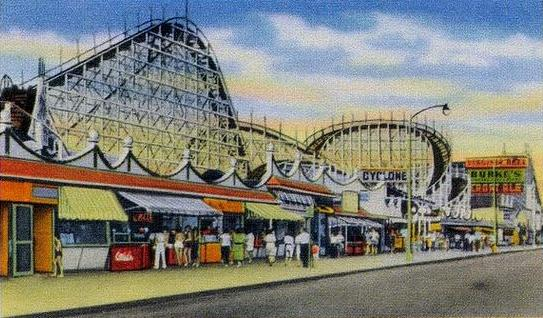
The Cyclone, Revere Beach, Massachusetts, USA

Unnamed roller coaster in Hayes, England

== See also ==
- Amusement park (Lists of amusement parks)
- Amusement rides on the National Register of Historic Places
- Fear of roller coasters
- List of roller coaster elements
- List of roller coaster rankings
- List of theme park management video games
- Roller coaster train
- Ron Toomer
