= 2010 in amusement parks =

This is a list of events and openings related to amusement parks that occurred in 2010. These various lists are not exhaustive.

== Amusement Parks ==
=== Opening ===
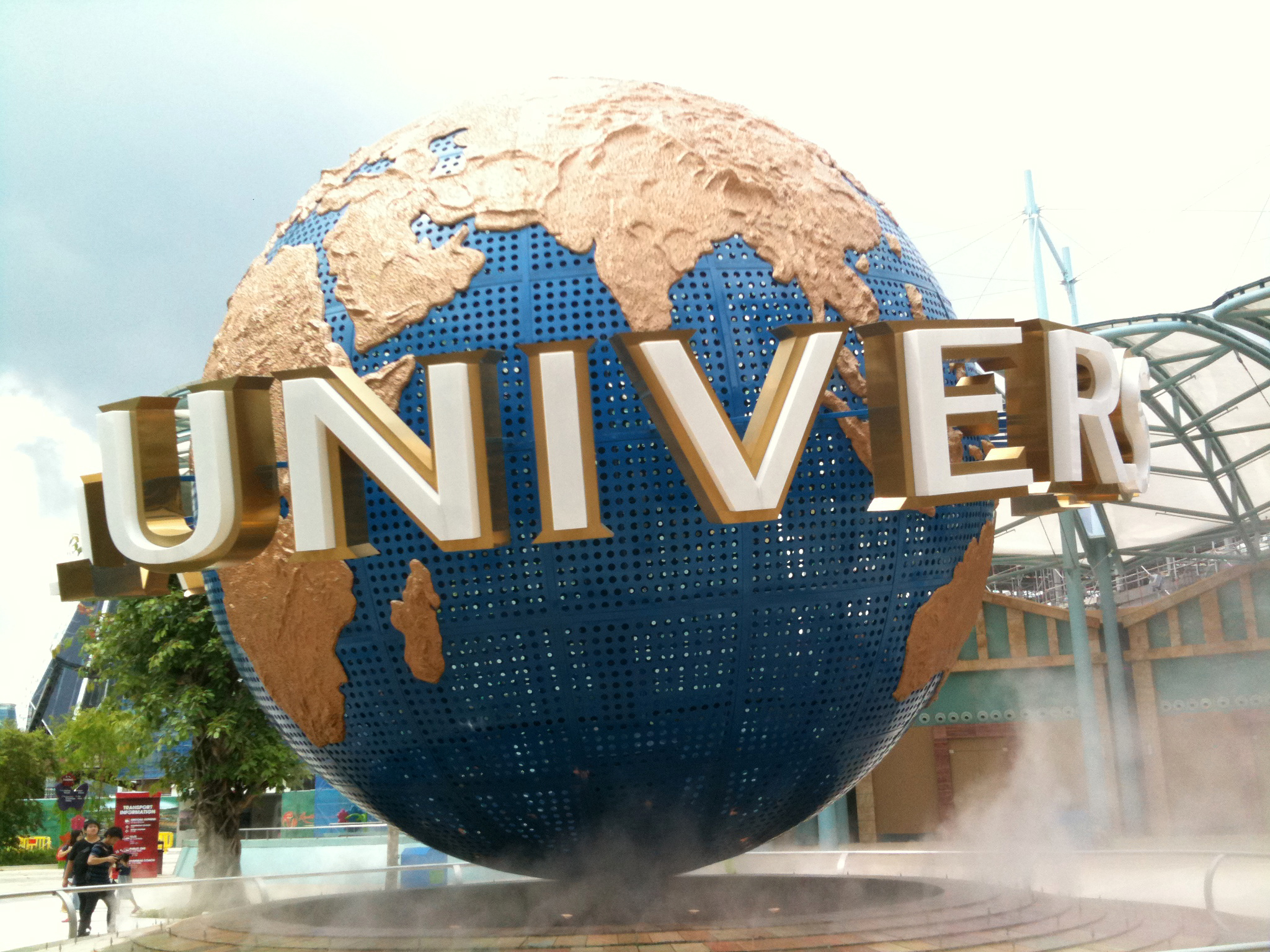
Universal Studios Singapore opened in March.

- UAE Ferrari World Abu Dhabi - November 4
- China Fantawild Adventure - May 1
- Singapore Universal Studios Singapore - March 18
- Taiwan E-DA Theme Park

=== Birthday ===
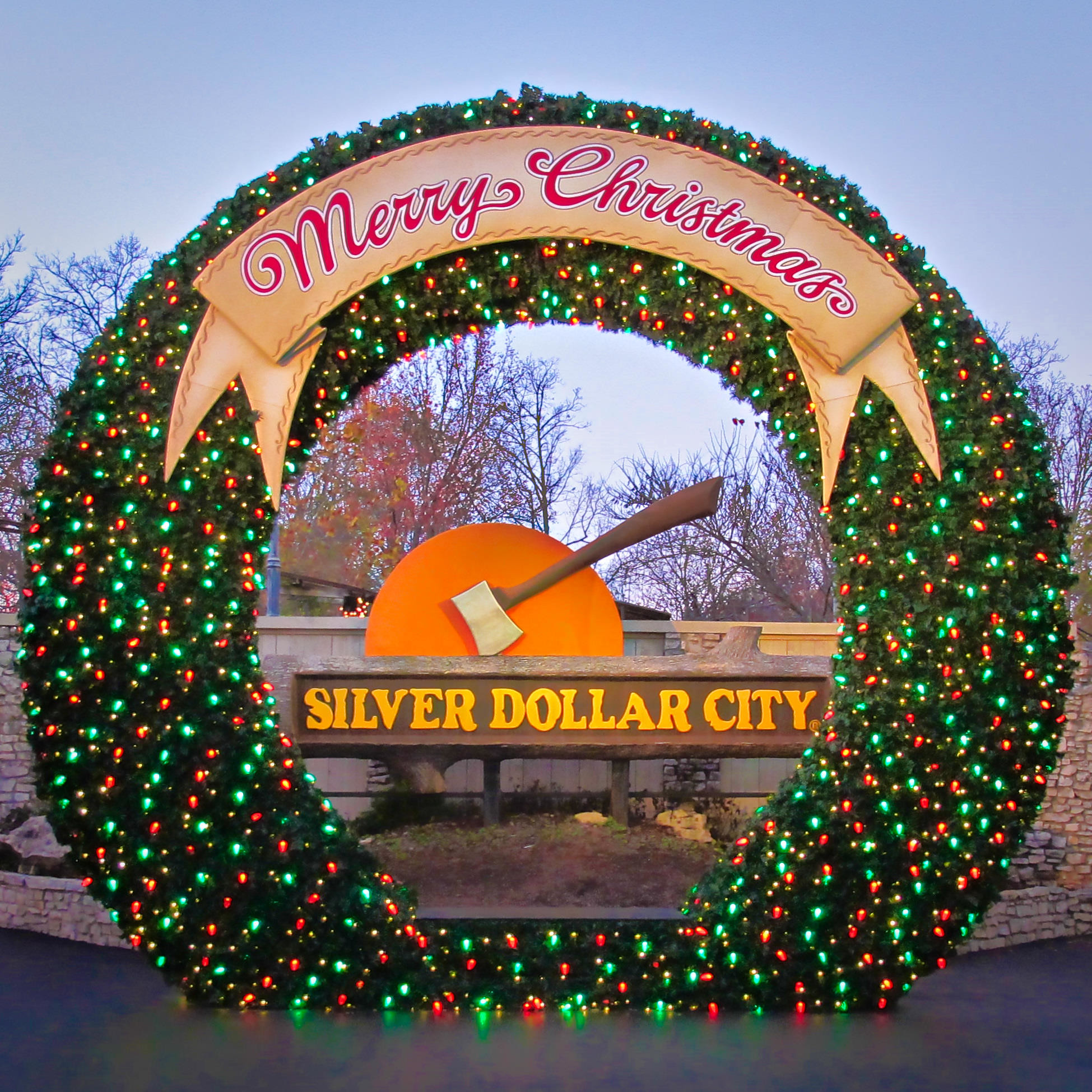
Silver Dollar City celebrates its 50th anniversary in May.

- Mt. Olympus Water & Theme Park - 20th Birthday
- Universal Studios Florida - 20th Birthday
- Alton Towers - 30th Birthday
- Busch Gardens Williamsburg - 35th Birthday
- Europa Park - 35th Birthday
- Walibi Belgium - 35th Birthday
- Silver Dollar City - 50th Birthday
- Disneyland - 55th Birthday
- Knott's Berry Farm - 70th Birthday
- Cedar Point - 140th Birthday
- Six Flags New England - 140th Birthday

=== Closed ===
- Buckskin Joe
- Fantasy Gardens
- Karolinelund
- Loudoun Castle
- Terra Encantada - June 19

== Additions ==
=== Roller coasters ===
==== New ====
Name	Park	Type	Manufacturer	Opened	Ref(s)
Air Grover	Busch Gardens Tampa	Family roller coaster	Zierer	March 27	
Battlestar Galactica	Universal Studios Singapore	Dueling Steel roller coaster	Vekoma	March 18	
Big Air	E-DA Theme Park	Steel roller coaster	Vekoma	December 2010	
Brontojet	Movieland Park	Steel roller coaster	Anton Schwarzkopf	July 31	
Canopy Flyer	Universal Studios Singapore	Suspended roller coaster	Setpoint	March 18	
Circus Coaster	Luna Park	Family roller coaster	Zamperla	May 29	
Cobra	Conny-Land	Steel roller coaster	Pax Company	July 29	
Dark Ride	E-DA Theme Park	Junior roller coaster	Vekoma	June 19	
Ednör - L'Attaque	La Ronde	Inverted roller coaster	Vekoma	May 15	
Enchanted Airways	Universal Studios Singapore	Family roller coaster	Vekoma	March 18	
Fiorano GT Challenge	Ferrari World Abu Dhabi	Dueling Steel roller coaster	Maurer Rides	November 4	
Flare Meteor	Fantawild Adventure	Suspended roller coaster	Golden Horse	May 1	
Flume Ride	E-DA Theme Park	Water coaster	ABC Rides	2010	
Force One	Schwaben Park	Steel roller coaster	Zierer	May 18	
Formula Rossa	Ferrari World Abu Dhabi	Launched roller coaster	Intamin	November 4	
Golden Whirlwind	Fantawild Adventure	Steel roller coaster	SAMECO	December 8	
Hanging Pulley	Fantawild Adventure	Suspended roller coaster	Golden Horse	January 28	
Huracan	Belantis	Euro-Fighter	Gerstlauer	June 26	
Intimidator	Carowinds	Steel roller coaster	Bolliger & Mabillard	March 27	
Intimidator 305	Kings Dominion	Steel roller coaster	Intamin	April 2	
Joris en de Draak	Efteling	Dueling Wooden roller coaster	Great Coasters International	July 1	
King of Kings	Guiyang Happy World	Inverted roller coaster	Golden Horse	October 1	
Space Fantasy – The Ride	Universal Studios Japan	Spinning roller coaster	Mack Rides	March 19	
Max Speed	Suzhou Amusement Land	Shuttle Loop coaster	Beijing Shibaolai Amusement Equipment	2010	
Moto Bala	Mundo Petapa	Motorbike roller coaster	Zamperla	2010	
MotoGee	Särkänniemi Amusement Park	Motorbike roller coaster	Zamperla	April 30	
Outer Space Flying Car	Fantawild Adventure	Family roller coaster	Golden Horse	January 28	
Rakevet Harim	Luna Park, Tel Aviv	Junior roller coaster	Vekoma	March 14	
RC Racer	Disneyland Paris	Half Pipe roller coaster	Intamin	August 17	
Revenge of the Mummy	Universal Studios Singapore	Steel roller coaster	Premier Rides	March 18	
Sky Rocket	Kennywood	Launched roller coaster	Premier Rides	June 29	
Spinning Coaster	Infunity	Spinning roller coaster	Gerstlauer	2010	
Thirteen	Alton Towers	Steel roller coaster	Intamin	March 20	
Tickler	Luna Park	Wild Mouse roller coaster	Zamperla	May 29	
Young Star Coaster	Chimelong Paradise	Steel roller coaster	Mack Rides	February 8	

==== Relocated ====
Name	Park	Type	Manufacturer	Opened	Formerly	Ref(s)
Holly's Wilde Autofahrt	Holiday Park	Wild Mouse roller coaster	Maurer Rides	August 10	Rat at Loudoun Castle	
Jumbo Jet	Dreamland	Steel roller coaster	Anton Schwarzkopf	2010	unknown at Beoland	
Little Dipper	Six Flags Great America	Junior Wooden roller coaster	Philadelphia Toboggan Coasters	May 27	Little Dipper at Kiddieland	
Loco Loco	Blue Bayou Dixie Landin'	Family roller coaster	E&F Miler Industries	June 2010	Harvest Express Coaster at Nut Tree Park	
Monster	Walygator Parc	Inverted roller coaster	Bolliger & Mabillard	July 9	Orochi at Expoland	
Viking Voyage	Wild Adventures	Steel roller coaster	E&F Miler Industries	2010	Jack Rabbit at Celebration City	

==== Refurbished ====
Name	Park	Type	Manufacturer	Opened	Formerly	Ref(s)
Dragon Challenge	Islands of Adventure	Dueling Inverted roller coaster	Bolliger & Mabillard	June 18	Dueling Dragons	
Flight of the Hippogriff	Islands of Adventure	Junior roller coaster	Vekoma	June 18	Flying Unicorn	

=== Other Attractions ===
==== New ====
Name	Park	Type	Opened	Ref(s)
BrainSurge	Nickelodeon Universe	Unicoaster	March 20	
Bumper Boats	Michigan's Adventure	Bumper Boats	2010	
Captain EO	Disneyland; Epcot; Tokyo Disneyland; Disneyland Paris	Show	February 23; July 2 July 1 June 12	
Dutchman's Deck Adventure Course	Nickelodeon Universe	Rope Course	2010	
Giant Canyon Swing	Glenwood Caverns Adventure Park	Sceamin' Swing	2010	
Harry Potter and the Forbidden Journey	Islands of Adventure	Dark Ride	June 18	
King Kong 360 3D	Universal Studios Hollywood	Simulation Ride	July 1	
SkyJump Las Vegas	Stratosphere Las Vegas	Zipline Ride	April 2010	
Shoot the Rapids	Cedar Point	Log Flume	June 26	
Thomas Town	Six Flags America	Kids Area	June 5	

==== Refurbished ====
Name	Park	Type	Opened	Formerly	Ref(s)
Boo Blasters on Boo Hill	Canada's Wonderland; Carowinds; Kings Island; Kings Dominion	Dark Ride	May 2 March 27; April 2 April 17	Scooby-Doo's Haunted Mansion	
Planet Snoopy	Canada's Wonderland; California's Great America; Carowinds; Kings Island; Kings Dominion	Themed Kids Area	May 1 March 28; March 27; April 17; April 2	Nickelodeon Central	
Sesame Street Safari of Fun	Busch Gardens Tampa	Themed Kids Area	March 27	Land of the Dragons	
SkyPoint Observation Deck	Q1	Observation tower	15 December	Q1 Observation Deck	
The Wizarding World of Harry Potter	Islands of Adventure	Themed Area	June 18	Merlinwood	

==== Relocated ====
Name	Park	Type	Opened	Formerly	Ref(s)
Demon Drop	Dorney Park	Freefall Ride	July 2	Demon Drop at Cedar Point	

== Closed attractions and roller coasters ==
Name	Park	Type	Closed	Ref(s)
Avalanche	Six Flags America	Alpine Bobs	2010	
Backdraft	Universal Studios Hollywood	Show	April 11	
Chaos	Cedar Point	Chance Rides Chaos	2010	
Chaos	Elitch Gardens	Chance Rides Chaos	2010	
Great America Raceway	Six Flags Great America	Antique Cars	2010	
Great American Scream Machine	Six Flags Great Adventure	Steel roller coaster	July 18	
Honey, I Shrunk the Audience!	Disneyland; Epcot; Tokyo Disneyland; Disneyland Paris	Show	January 4 May 9 May 10; May 3	
Krazy Kars	Dorney Park	Bumper Cars	2010	
La Tornade	La Ronde	Top Spin	2010	
Mild Thing	Valleyfair	Kiddie roller coaster	2010	
The Octopus	Six Flags America	Octopus	2010	
Rainbow	Elitch Gardens	Rainbow	2010	
Ripcord	Dutch Wonderland	Parachute Ride	2010	
Riverview Racer	Six Flags St. Louis	Swing Ride	2010	
Rock Wall	La Ronde	Rock Wall	2010	
Rotor	Lake Compounce	Rotor	2010	
Shake, Rattle & Roll	Six Flags Over Georgia	Scrambler	2010	
Invertigo	California's Great America	Invertigo	October 31	
Jet Scream	Canada's Wonderland	Intamin Looping Starship	October 10, 2010	
