= Charlie Brown's Wind Up =

Charlie Brown's Wind Up can mean any of several miniature swing rides for children, at these Cedar Fair parks:

== Locations ==
- Charlie Brown's Wind Up at Carowinds
- Charlie Brown's Wind Up at Cedar Point
- Charlie Brown's Wind Up at Dorney Park & Wildwater Kingdom
- Charlie Brown's Wind Up (Kings Island)
- Charlie Brown's Wind Up at Valleyfair
- Charlie Brown's Wind Up at Worlds of Fun
