= Skyhawk (Cedar Point) =

Screamin' Swing ride at Cedar Point

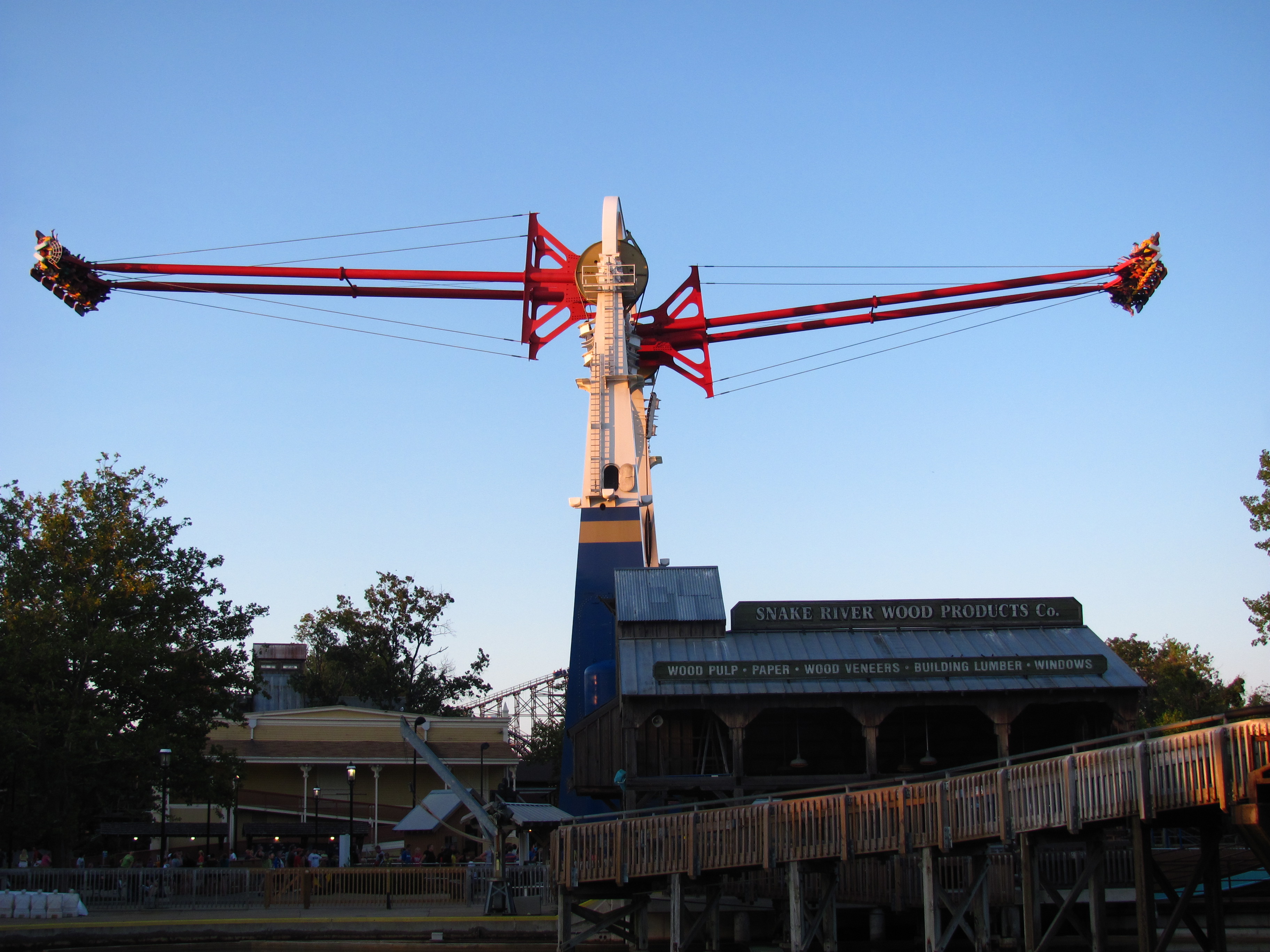
- Skyhawk with Snake River Falls in the foreground.

Cedar Point
- Area: Frontier Town
- Coordinates: 41°29′3.62″N 82°41′26.83″W
- Status: Operating
- Opening date: May 6, 2006

Ride statistics
- Manufacturer: S&S Worldwide
- Model: Screamin' Swing
- Height: 103 ft (31 m)
- Drop: 125 ft (38 m)
- Speed: 65 mph (105 km/h)
- Capacity: 800 riders per hour
- Vehicles: 2
- Riders per vehicle: 20
- Rows: 2
- Duration: 1 minute
- Height restriction: 48 in (122 cm)
- Restraints: Lap bar
- Fast Lane available

Skyhawk is a Screamin' Swing built by S&S Worldwide at Cedar Point in Sandusky, Ohio. It is located in Frontiertown. It opened on May 6, 2006, the beginning of Cedar Point's 137th season. A similar ride, Xtreme Swing, opened at Valleyfair the same year.

== Specifications ==
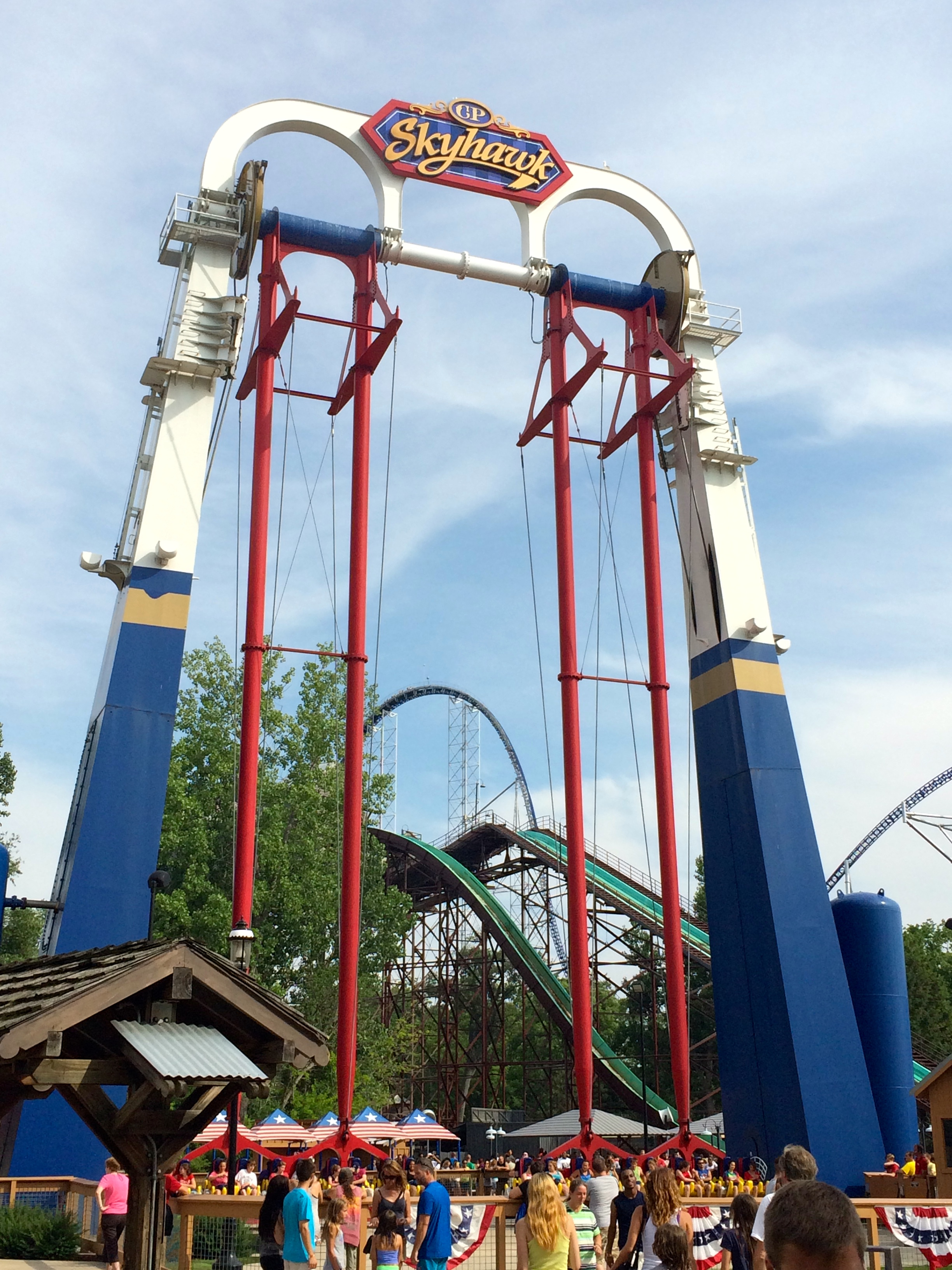
Skyhawk in the loading/unloading position.

Skyhawk is a Screamin' Swing type ride built by S&S Worldwide. The structure itself is 103 feet (31 m) tall at its highest point. It consists of two swinging arms, both 84 feet (26 m) tall, seating 20 across and 20 back to back (40 total). At full swing, the ends of the arms approach 125 feet (38 m) high off the ground, and achieve a maximum speed of 65 miles per hour (105 km/h). The ride lasts about one minute, and can accommodate 800 passengers per hour. Riders must be 48 inches (1,200 mm) or taller. Riders are restrained by a lap bar.

== Incidents ==
On July 26, 2014, a cable supporting one of the carriages on the pendulum came loose, injuring two guests. One guest was treated on the scene, while the other was taken to a hospital and released. Skyhawk reopened on August 1, 2014.
