= Mad Mouse (Valleyfair) =

Roller coaster in Shakopee, Minnesota

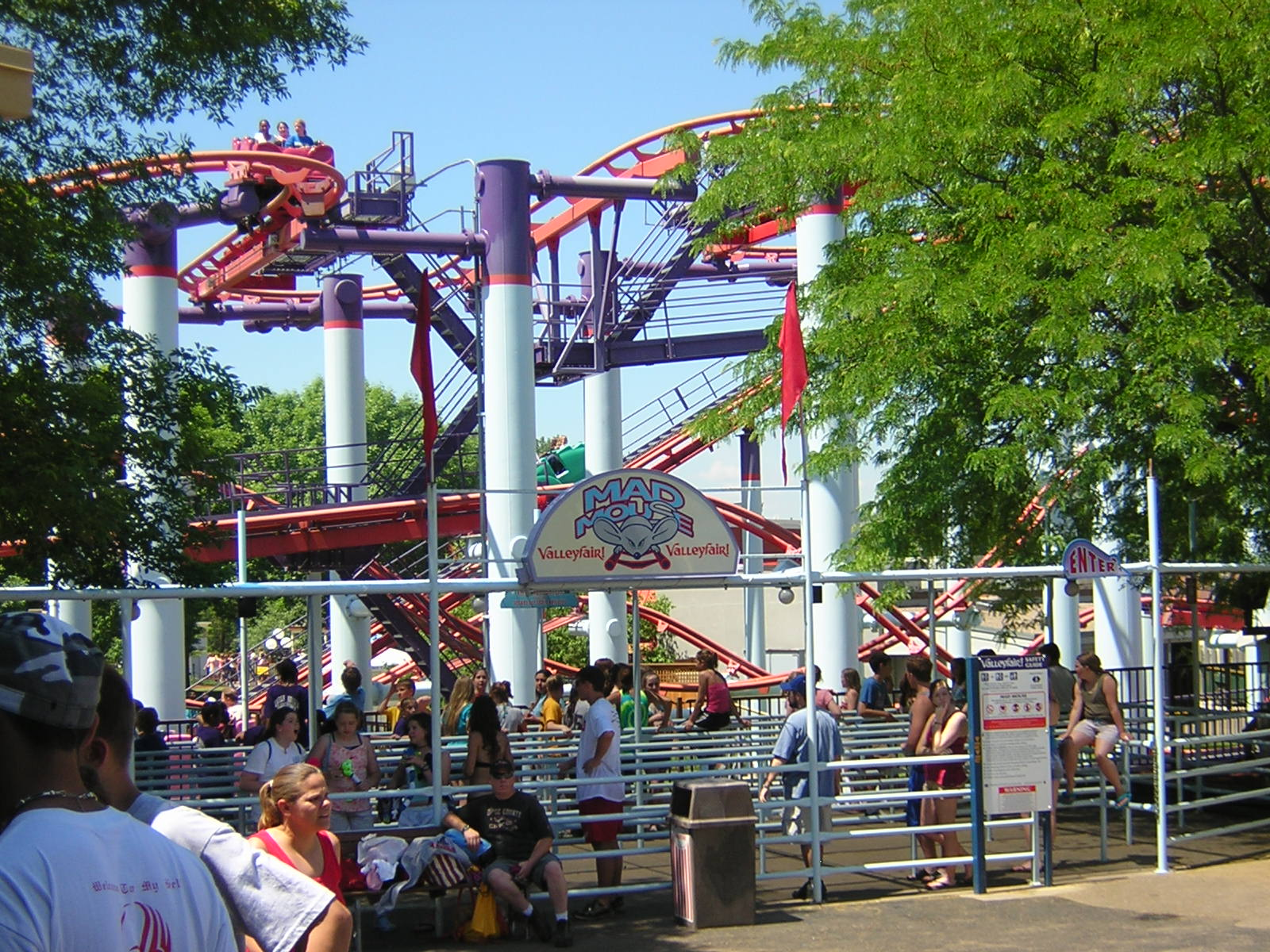
- Entrance of Mad Mouse

Valleyfair
- Location: Valleyfair
- Coordinates: 44.7999°N 93.4591°W
- Status: Operating
- Opening date: May 8, 1999

General statistics
- Type: Steel – Wild Mouse
- Manufacturer: Arrow Dynamics
- Model: Mad Mouse
- Track layout: Wild Mouse
- Lift/launch system: Chain lift hill
- Height: 50 ft (15 m)
- Length: 1,257 ft (383 m)
- Speed: 30 mph (48 km/h)
- Inversions: 0
- Duration: 1:30
- Capacity: 1000 riders per hour
- Height restriction: 42 in (107 cm)
- Trains: 8 trains with a single car. Riders are arranged 2 across in 2 rows for a total of 4 riders per train.
- Fast Lane available
- Mad Mouse at RCDB

Mad Mouse is a steel wild mouse roller coaster located at Valleyfair in Shakopee, Minnesota, U.S. It was manufactured by Arrow Dynamics and opened on May 8, 1999 as a replacement for the similar coaster Rails, which was eventually moved to Jolly Roger Amusement Park in Maryland in 1998. The ride's track and supports were designed by Ride Centerline.
