= Wildcat (Jolly Roger Amusement Park) =

Steel roller coaster

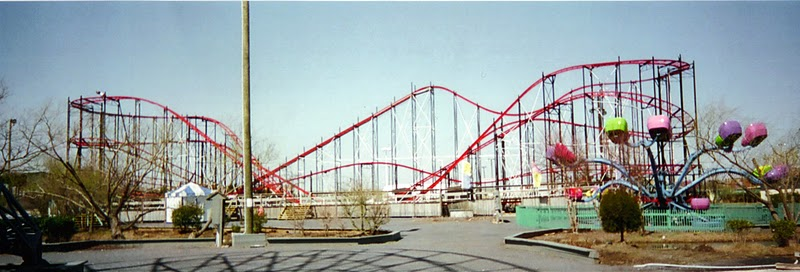
- Wildcat when it operated at Cedar Point.

Jolly Roger Amusement Park
- Coordinates: 38.3585°N 75.0766°W
- Status: Operating
- Opening date: 1999

Valleyfair!
- Coordinates: 44.799°N 93.453°W
- Status: Removed
- Opening date: 1979
- Closing date: 1998

Cedar Point
- Coordinates: 41.478°N 82.679°W
- Status: Removed
- Opening date: May 23, 1970
- Closing date: 1978

General statistics
- Type: Steel
- Manufacturer: Anton Schwarzkopf
- Model: Wildcat/65m
- Lift/launch system: Chain lift
- Inversions: 0
- Trains: Unknown number of trains with a single car; riders arranged 2 across in 2 rows for a total of 4 riders per train
- Wildcat at RCDB

Wildcat is a roller coaster manufactured by Anton Schwarzkopf, currently operating at Jolly Roger Amusement Park in Ocean City, Maryland. The ride has also operated at other parks such as Cedar Point and Valleyfair.

== History ==
Over its lifetime, the roller coaster has been relocated three times, opening for the first time at Cedar Point in Sandusky, Ohio in 1970 as Wildcat. Then, after the 1978 season, it was relocated to Valleyfair! in Shakopee, Minnesota and opened for the 1979 season as Wild Rails.

Twenty years later, in 1999, the ride was relocated a second time to Jolly Roger Amusement Park, where it operated until 2001. It was put into storage until 2015, when it reopened in a different section in the park.

== Incidents ==
On August 16, 2019, at around 8:20pm, one car failed to stop while entering the station, colliding with another car, injuring 5 people consisting of 4 children and 1 adult.
