= Power Tower =

Thrill ride at two Cedar Fair parks

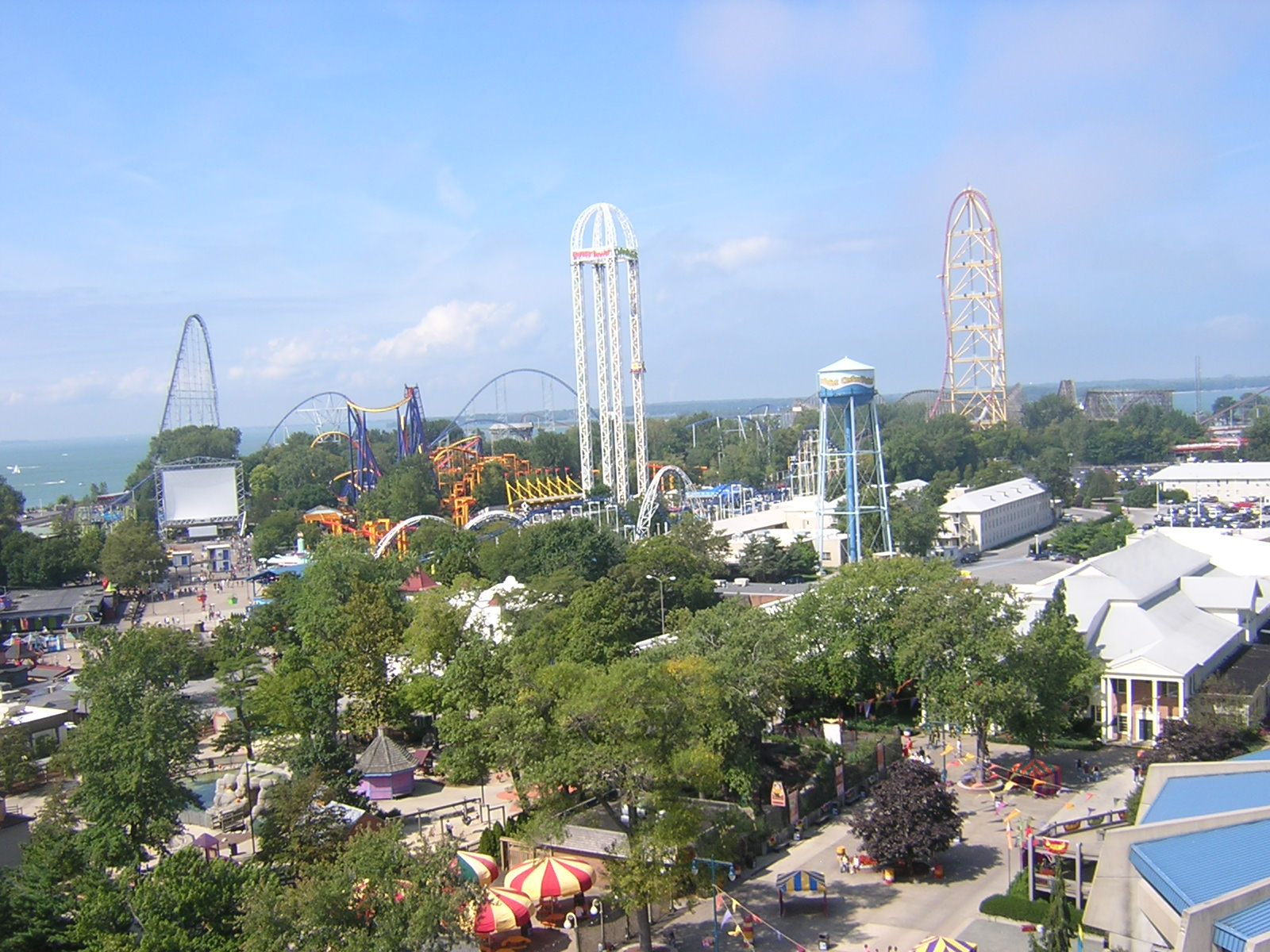
- Overview of Cedar Point with Power Tower in the center, Millennium Force on the left and Top Thrill Dragster on the right.

Cedar Point
- Area: Top Thrill 2 Midway
- Coordinates: 41°28′57.74″N 82°41′4.42″W
- Status: Operating
- Opening date: May 9, 1998

Valleyfair
- Coordinates: 44°47′58.17″N 93°27′24.50″W
- Status: Operating
- Cost: $10,000,000
- Opening date: May 6, 2000
- Replaced: Tot Town

Ride statistics
- Attraction type: Space Shot, Turbo Drop
- Manufacturer: S&S Power
- Designer: Stan Checketts
- Model: Combo Tower
- Height: 300 or 275 ft (91 or 84 m)
- Drop: 240 or 250 ft (73 or 76 m)
- Speed: 50 mph (80 km/h)
- Vehicle type: Freefall carriage
- Vehicles: 4 (Cedar Point); 3 (Valleyfair)
- Riders per vehicle: 12
- Height restriction: 48 in (122 cm)
- Restraints: Over-the-shoulder restraints with interlocking seatbelt
- Launch System: Pneumatic
- Fast Lane available at both parks

Power Tower is a thrill ride located at two amusement parks in the US, Cedar Point and Valleyfair. The attractions are powered by air in large cylinders in which an aircraft steel cable, connected to the internal piston, travels and is also connected to the external rider car. Hydraulic cylinders at the base of the tower provide an extra measure of safety in case of a ride malfunction. Both rides were designed and manufactured by S&S Power of Logan, Utah. As of the 2020 season from their respective websites, both changed their height requirements from 52 inches (130 cm) to 48 inches (120 cm).

== Cedar Point ==
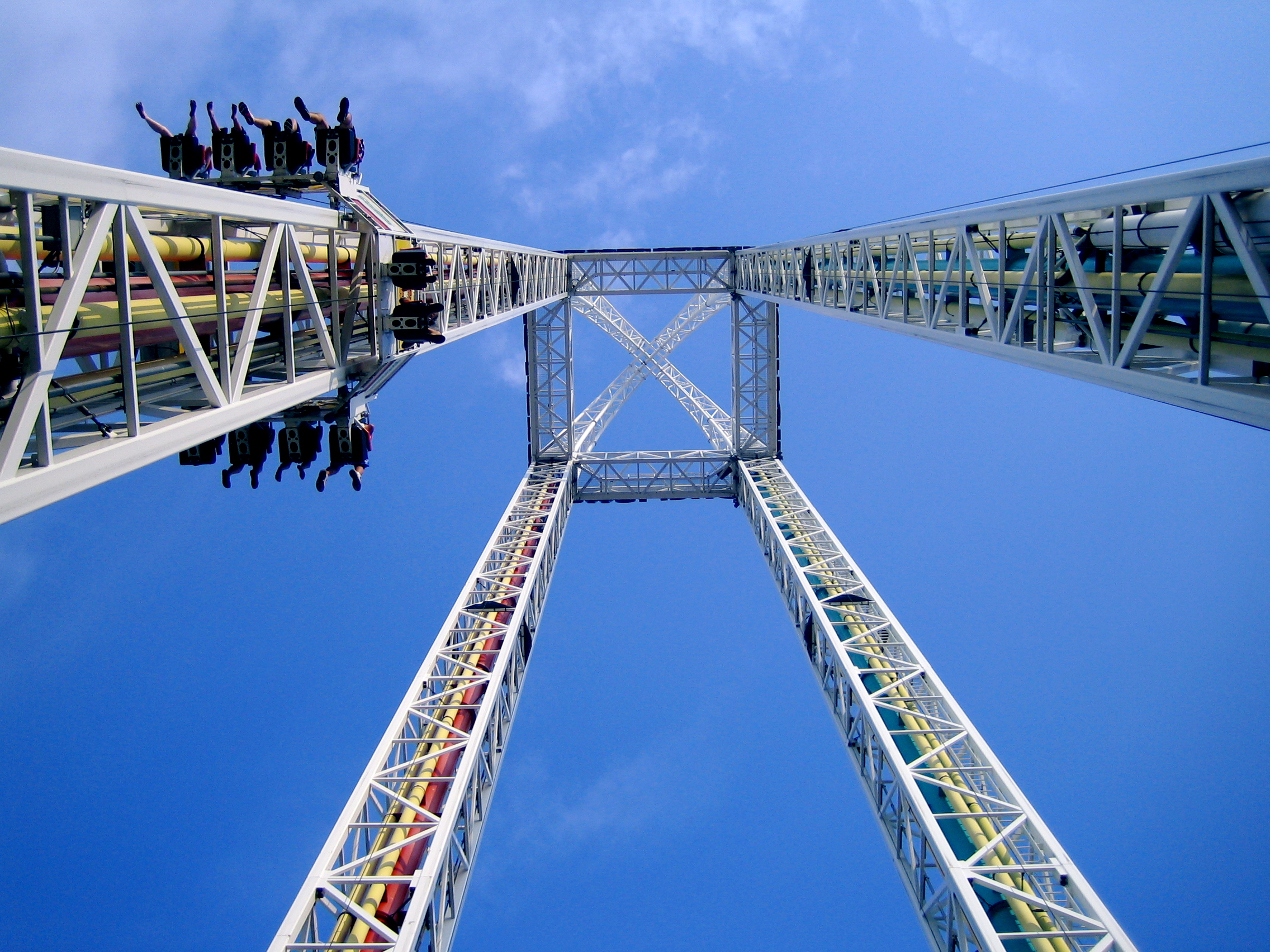
Cedar Point's Power Tower from below

Power Tower at Cedar Point is a multi-tower attraction featuring a pair of Space Shot rides and a pair of Turbo Drop rides, arranged in a square-footprint with a crowning marquee and crisscrossed arches joining the four rides at their peaks. Power Tower is the only four-towered drop tower ride in the world to date, devoting two towers to each drop cycle. The ride was announced on August 20, 1997 and opened to guests in 1998.

Sixteen new LED lights from Chauvet Professional were installed on Power Tower before the 2012 season.

=== Ride specifications ===
- Height: 300 ft (91 m)
- Drop height: 240 ft (73 m)
- Top speed: 50 mph (80 km/h)
- G-force: min -1.0 g, max +4.0
- Ride Duration: 45 sec
- Capacity: 1,700 rides per hour
- Thrill Rating: 5

== Valleyfair ==
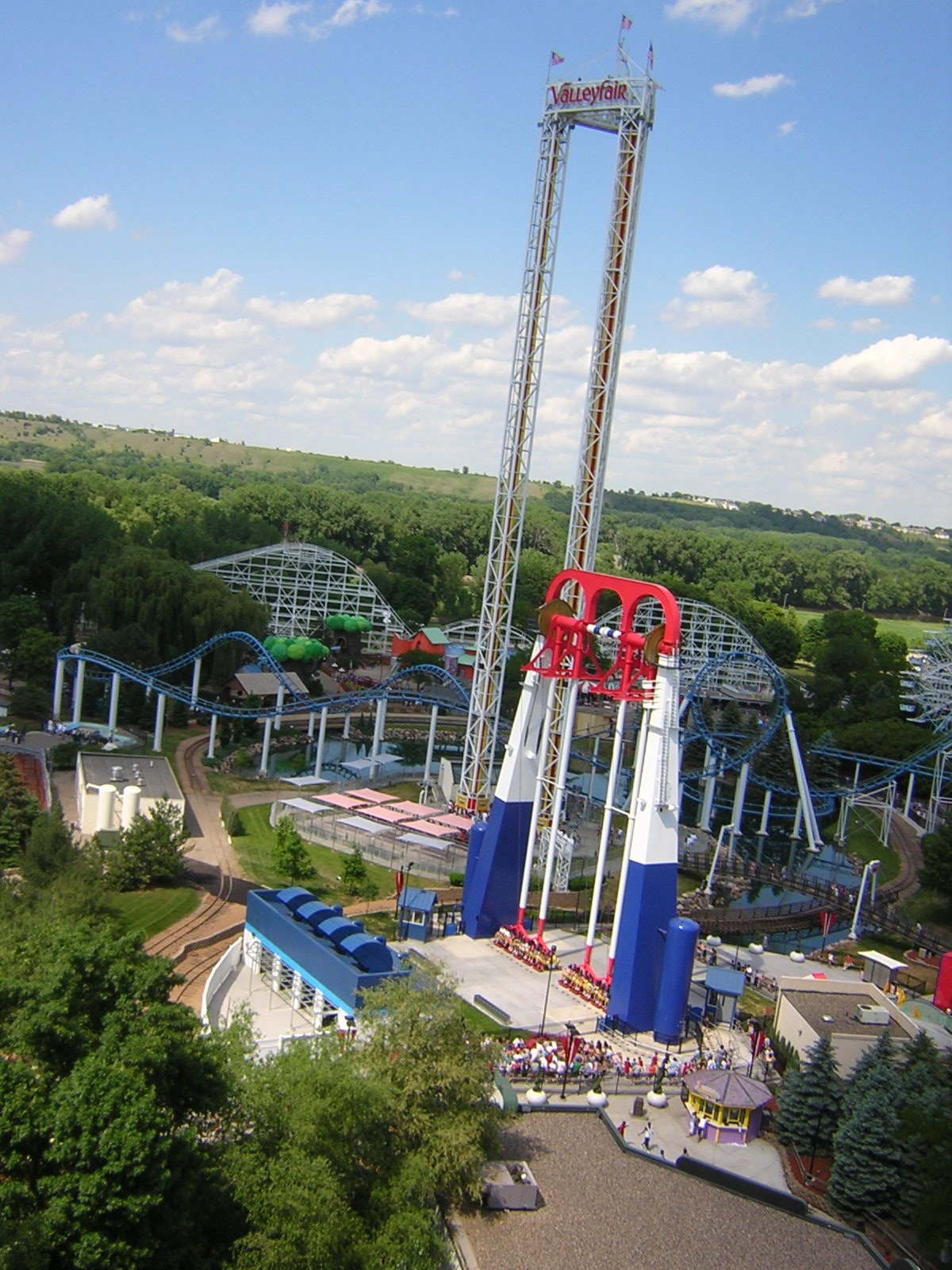
View of Power Tower at Valleyfair, with Xtreme Swing in front.

Power Tower at Valleyfair is a multi-tower attraction featuring a pair of Turbo Drop rides and a single Space Shot ride, arranged in a triangular-footprint with a crowning marquee joining the three rides at their peaks.

Power Tower is the tallest ride in Minnesota. The ride was originally intended to be 300 feet (91 m) tall, but the Federal Aviation Administration prohibits Valleyfair's rides from being built taller than 275 feet (84 m) because of the nearby Flying Cloud Airport.

=== Ride specifications ===
- Height: 275 ft (84 m)
- Drop height: 250 ft (76 m)
- Top Speed: 50 mph (80 km/h)
- G-force: min -1.0 g, max +4.0
- Ride Duration: 45 sec
- Capacity: 1,300 rides per hour
- Thrill Rating: 5

== Records ==
Cedar Point's Power Tower was the tallest vertical ascending and descending thrill ride upon debut up until July 1998, when Supreme Scream opened at Knott's Berry Farm.

Preceded by Pitt Fall	World's Tallest Vertical Drop Ride; May 1998–July 1998	Succeeded by Supreme Scream

== Incidents ==
- On August 10, 2025, a cable snapped on one of the towers of the Cedar Point installation. The ride was safely evacuated by manually bringing the car back to the ground. No injuries were reported. The ride was immediately shut down pending a thorough investigation.

== See also ==
- Supreme Scream
