= Challenge Park =

Challenge Park may refer to:

- Cedar Point's Challenge Park, an area within Cedar Point in Sandusky, Ohio from 1992–2016
- Valleyfair Challenge Park, an area within Valleyfair in Shakopee, Minnesota from 1991–2013
