= Peanuts Road Rally =

Peanuts Road Rally may refer to several amusement ride located at six different Six Flags parks:

- Road Rally at Kings Dominion
- PEANUTS Off-Road Rally at Kings Island
- PEANUTS Road Rally at Cedar Point
- PEANUTS Road Rally at Dorney Park & Wildwater Kingdom
- PEANUTS Road Rally at Valleyfair
- PEANUTS Road Rally at Worlds of Fun

== See also ==
- Road rally (disambiguation)
