= Peanuts 500 =

Peanuts 500 may refer to several amusement rides located at the Planet Snoopy themed area of Cedar Fair Parks:

- PEANUTS 500 at Canada's Wonderland
- PEANUTS 500 at Cedar Point
- PEANUTS 500 at Dorney Park & Wildwater Kingdom
- Peanuts 500 (Kings Island)
- PEANUTS 500 at Valleyfair
- PEANUTS 500 at Worlds of Fun
