= Road rally =

Road rally may refer to:

- Rallying
- Peanuts Road Rally (disambiguation)
- "Road Rally", a 2010 episode of season 3 of Mickey Mouse Clubhouse
