= Supreme Scream =

Turbo Drop amusement ride

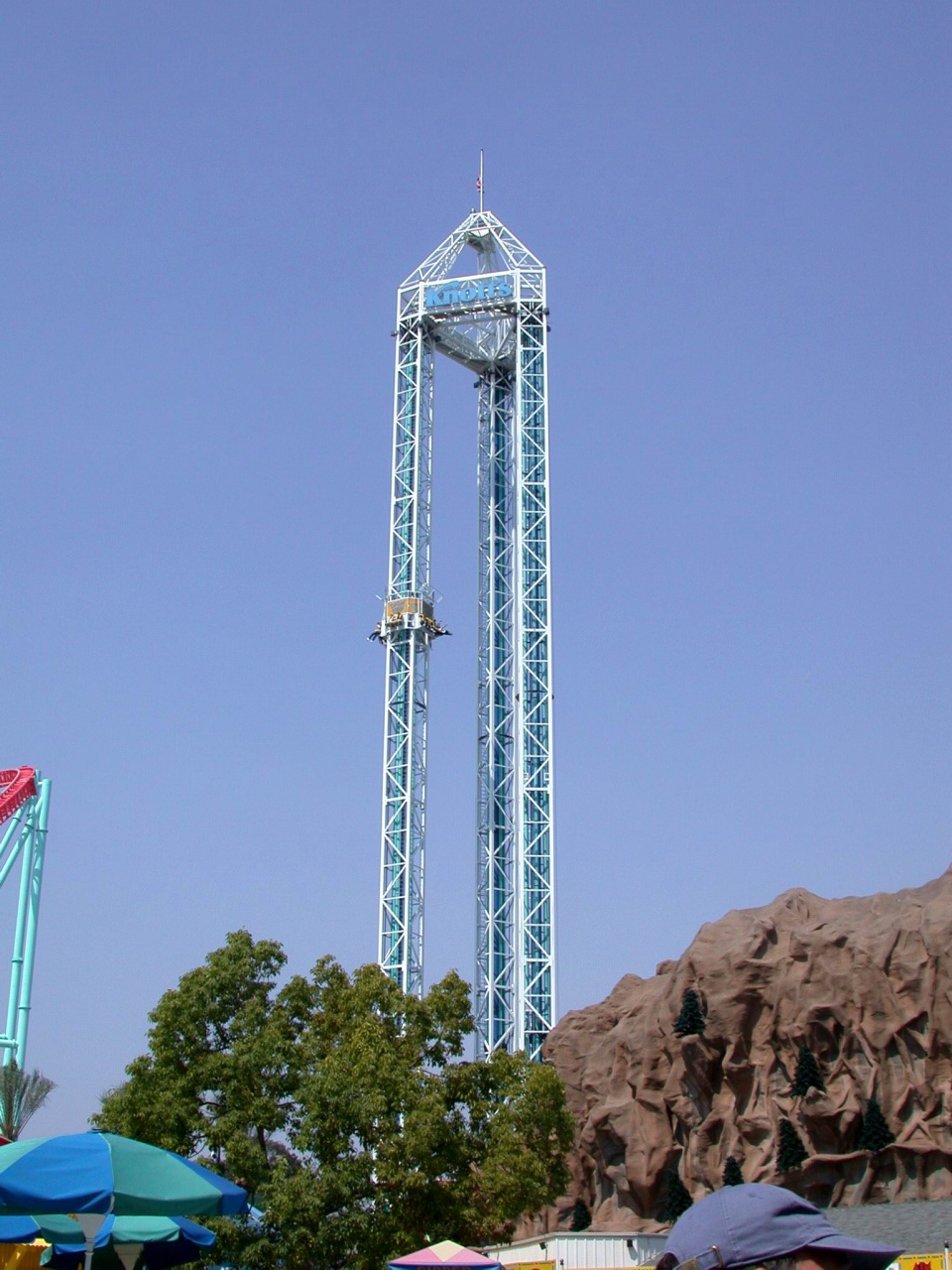
- View of Supreme Scream in 2002

Knotts Berry Farm
- Area: The Boardwalk
- Status: Operating
- Cost: USD $10,000,000
- Soft opening date: July 1, 1998
- Opening date: July 3, 1998
- Replaced: XK-1

Ride statistics
- Manufacturer: S&S Worldwide
- Designer: Stan Checketts
- Model: Turbo Drop
- Height: 312 ft (95 m)
- Drop: 252 ft (77 m)
- Speed: 50 mph (80 km/h)
- G-force: 4
- Riders per vehicle: 12
- Duration: 0:45
- Height restriction: 52 in (132 cm)
- Acceleration: 0 − 50 mph (80 km/h) in 3 seconds
- Launch System: Pneumatic
- Fast Lane available

Supreme Scream is a Turbo Drop amusement ride, sponsored by Toyota, located at Knott's Berry Farm in Buena Park, California, United States.

The ride consists of three individual Turbo Drop model towers arranged in a triangular footprint; the three towers joined at their peaks by a 60-foot-tall (18 m) pyramidal crown and marquee.

The entire structure is 312 feet (95 m) tall from the base to the top of the structure (omitting the topping 13 feet (4.0 m) flagpole, with the flag of the United States and the signage of Knott's Berry Farm (with only the Knott's logo, colored blue during the day and white while being light up at night) and is the tallest free-standing structure in Orange County. Supreme Scream carries 12 riders per tower in octagonal carriages upward at a speed of 8 miles per hour (13 km/h) before pausing for a brief moment at a height of 252 feet (77 m). Utilizing pneumatics paired with a pulley system, the ride carriages are then accelerated downward faster than a true free-fall to attain a top speed of 50 miles per hour (80 km/h)—exposing riders to a maximum G-force of 4 and negative G-force of -1.

The ride’s tagline is "30 Stories Up. 3 Seconds Down."

== History ==
Supreme Scream opened to the general public on July 3, 1998, as the tallest turbo drop–type amusement ride in the world. A soft opening for the attraction was held two days prior.

During its opening year, nearby local residents were complaining about the ride's noise. This was due to the screeching, scratching and rumbling sounds of punctuated blasts of air. To address the issue, S&S Worldwide and Knott's Berry Farm engineers would install 14-inch sound buffers in the ride's mechanics to muffle the screeching.

== Records ==
| Preceded by Power Tower (Cedar Point) | World's Tallest Vertical Drop Ride; July 1998–December 1998 | Succeeded by The Giant Drop |
