= High Roller (Valleyfair) =

Wooden roller coaster in Minnesota, US

Valleyfair
- Location: Valleyfair
- Coordinates: 44°48′02″N 93°27′28″W
- Status: Operating
- Opening date: 1976

General statistics
- Type: Wood
- Manufacturer: International Amusement Devices, Inc.
- Designer: Don Rosser
- Lift/launch system: Chain lift hill
- Height: 70 ft (21 m)
- Length: 2,928 ft (892 m)
- Speed: 50 mph (80 km/h)
- Inversions: 0
- Duration: 1:45
- Capacity: 1,150 riders per hour
- Trains: 2 trains with 4 cars; riders arranged 2 across in 3 rows for a total of 24 riders per train
- Website: Official website
- High Roller at RCDB

High Roller is a wooden roller coaster located at Valleyfair in Shakopee, Minnesota, USA. High Roller is Valleyfair's oldest roller coaster, being built in 1976 when the park opened. It is an out-and-back type coaster, and is 70 feet (21 m) at the highest peak with a top speed of 50 mph (80 km/h).

It is a common misconception that High Roller is really the Cyclone from nearby Excelsior Amusement Park, which closed a few years before Valleyfair opened. However, this is not the case. While High Roller bears some similarities to Cyclone, it was a brand new ride in 1976, and Cyclone was demolished when the Excelsior park closed.
