= Excelsior Amusement Park =

Park in Excelsior, Minnesota, US (1925–1973)

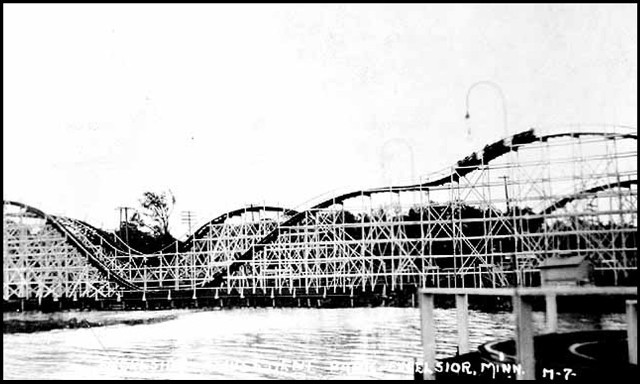
- "The Cyclone"
- Interactive map of Excelsior Amusement Park
- Location: Excelsior, Minnesota
- Coordinates: 44°54′12″N 93°33′45″W
- Status: Defunct
- Opened: 1925
- Closed: 1973
- Owner: Fred W. Pearce
- Operating season: Memorial Day through Labor Day

Excelsior Amusement Park was an amusement park on Lake Minnetonka in the town of Excelsior, Minnesota, United States. The park, which operated from 1925 to 1973, was a popular destination for company picnics and day trips from the Twin Cities.

== Attractions ==
Inspired by Coney Island, the park's main attractions included a wooden roller coaster called the Cyclone, a Ferris wheel, bumper cars, boat rides, a fun house, and a carousel. The fun house had a gunny sack slide, a spinning disc that hurled people into a padded sidewall, and a turning barrel that was nearly impossible to walk through. The carousel, built by the Philadelphia Toboggan Company, was in service for the entire duration of the park and is still in use at Valleyfair Amusement Park in Shakopee. A second ride, the Scrambler, was also saved from destruction. Contrary to widespread belief, the Cyclone roller coaster was not relocated to Valleyfair and renamed High Roller. The Cyclone was scrapped, and High Roller was designed especially for the new park.

== History ==
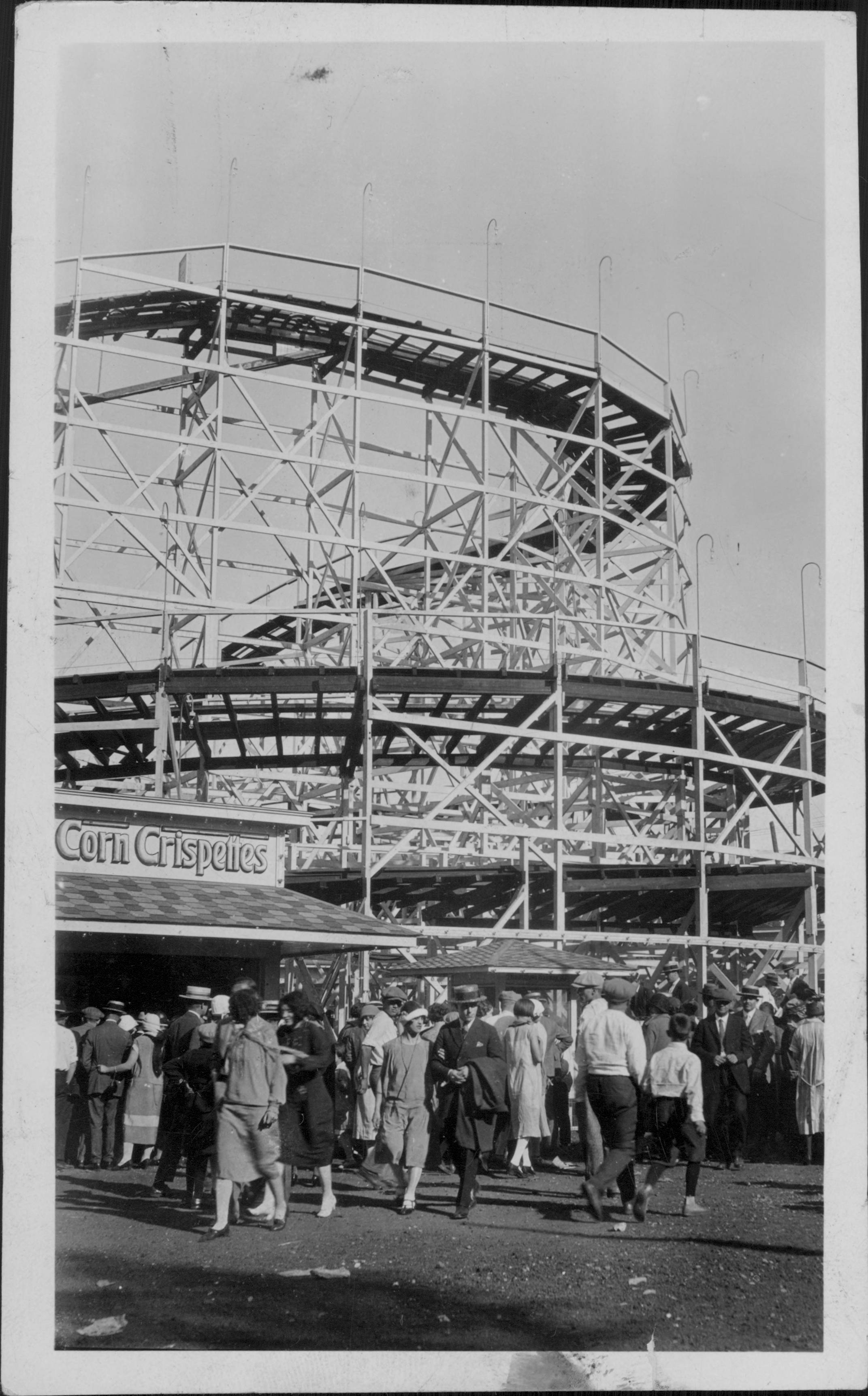
People at the Corn Crispettes food stand at Excelsior Amusement Park.

Excelsior Amusement Park opened in 1925 and was run by Fred W. Pearce, an established amusement park operator and roller coaster builder. A streetcar line from Minneapolis brought guests to the park from Memorial Day through Labor Day until the line was closed in 1932.

Excelsior Amusement Park featured stage shows in the 1930s, presented by Al Sheehan. The park was very popular in the 1940s and 1950s. By 1965 the park had added a very small children's compound and the park gave special rates to corporate and school groups.

Danceland Ballroom at Excelsior Amusement Park hosted many well-known musical acts, including Lawrence Welk, Tommy Dorsey, the Beach Boys and the Rolling Stones. Legend has it that a visit by the Rolling Stones in June 1964 inspired the lyrics to the song "You Can't Always Get What You Want." A chance meeting between Mick Jagger and local character Jimmy Hutmaker (Mr. Jimmy) gave rise to the story, which has never been verified.

During the 1960s, the park became a hangout for Excelsior teens and attracted crowds of young people from around the Twin Cities. But the City Council of Excelsior suspended the dancehall's license in 1966 because of "disturbances" to the public order and faced with demands for dress codes and extra police, Ray Colihan, the owner of the dancehall, closed it in 1967. The dancehall was then used for storage and vandals burned it down in the summer of 1973.

The decline of the park seemed inevitable because the constricted 5.5-acre site severely limited the possibility of adding new rides. Excelsior Amusement Park closed in 1973 and was demolished soon thereafter. The park's owners then purchased land in Scott County for a new venue. Valleyfair, which opened in Shakopee in 1976, occupies 90 acres and now serves as the Twin Cities' primary amusement park. The former amusement park site is currently occupied by condominiums and Maynard's Restaurant of Excelsior.

== See also ==
- Big Island Park
- Lake Minnetonka
- Excelsior, Minnesota
- Trolley park
