= Excalibur (Valleyfair) =

Steel roller coaster in Shakopee, Minnesota

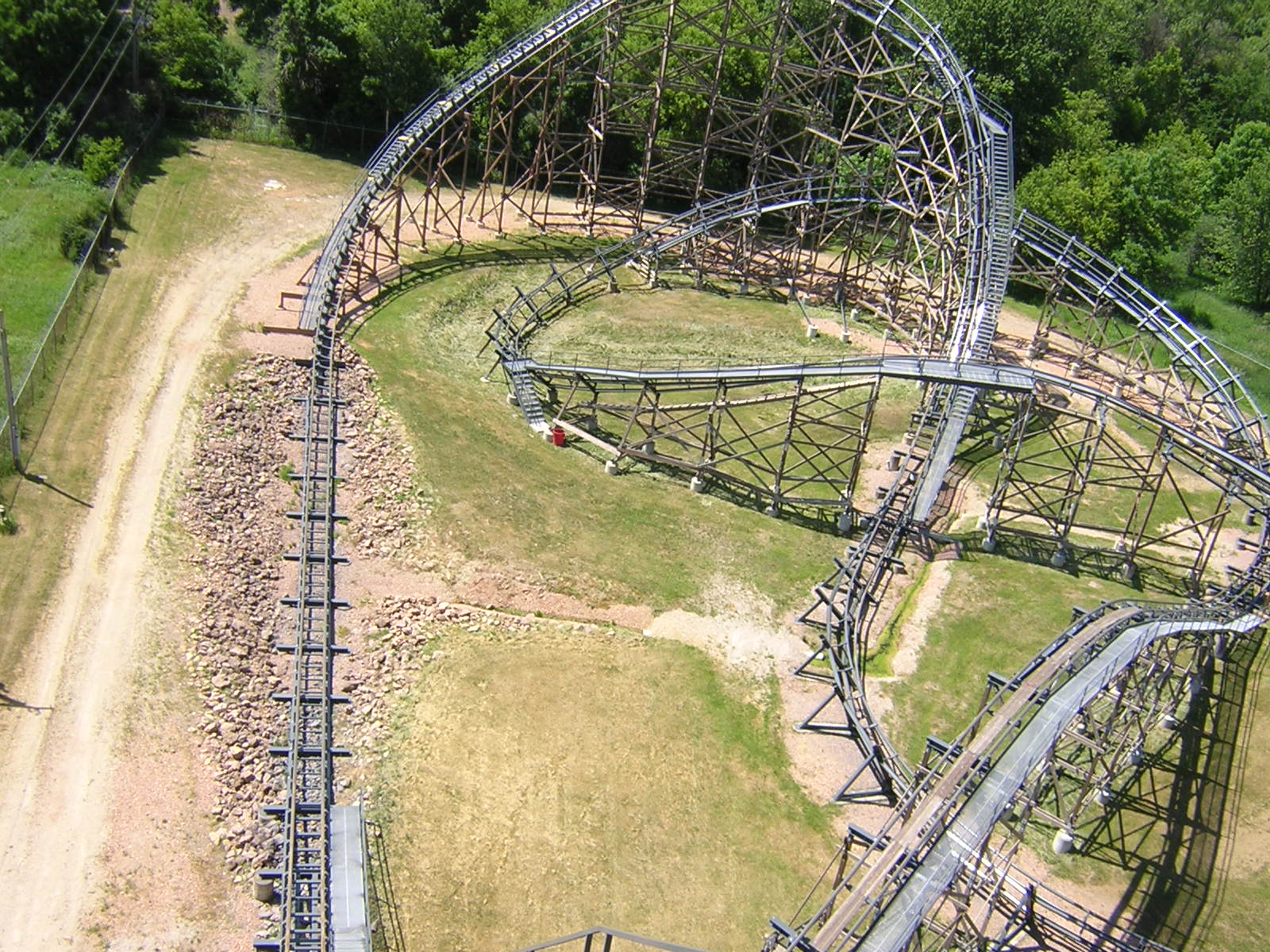
- View from top of lift hill

Valleyfair
- Location: Valleyfair
- Coordinates: 44°47′58.28″N 93°27′43.19″W
- Status: Operating
- Opening date: 1989
- Cost: $3,000,000 USD

General statistics
- Type: Steel
- Manufacturer: Arrow Dynamics
- Model: Special Coaster Systems/hybrid
- Lift/launch system: Chain lift hill
- Height: 100 ft (30 m)
- Drop: 105 ft (32 m)
- Length: 2,415 ft (736 m)
- Speed: 54.5 mph (87.7 km/h)
- Inversions: 0
- Duration: 2:17
- Max vertical angle: 60°
- Capacity: 1200 riders per hour
- G-force: 3.6
- Height restriction: 48 in (122 cm)
- Trains: 2 trains with 5 cars; riders arranged 2 across in 3 rows for a total of 30 riders per train
- Fast Lane available
- Excalibur at RCDB

Excalibur is a hybrid roller coaster with a wooden structure located at Valleyfair in Shakopee, Minnesota, United States. It was built in 1989 by Arrow Dynamics at a cost of $3,000,000. The ride is 105 feet (32 m) tall with a top speed of 54.5 mph (87.7 km/h) and has a minimum height requirement of 48 inches. It follows a custom figure-eight track layout and has a total ride duration of two minutes and thirteen seconds.

== History ==
In 2015, Valleyfair applied for a permit with the US Army Corps of Engineers to construct a road and parking lot on a plot of land currently partially taken up by Excalibur.
