= Renegade (roller coaster) =

Roller coaster at Valleyfair in Minnesota

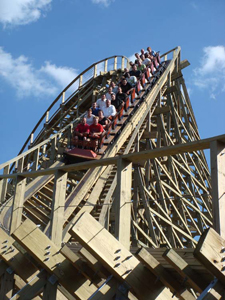
- Twisting 1st Drop

Valleyfair
- Location: Valleyfair
- Coordinates: 44°48′03″N 93°27′40″W
- Status: Operating
- Opening date: May 12, 2007
- Cost: $6,500,000 USD

General statistics
- Type: Wood
- Manufacturer: Great Coasters International
- Track layout: Out and Back, Twister
- Lift/launch system: Chain lift hill
- Height: 108.0 ft (32.9 m)
- Drop: 91.4 ft (27.9 m)
- Length: 3,113 ft (949 m)
- Speed: 51.3 mph (82.6 km/h)
- Inversions: 0
- Duration: 2:00
- Max vertical angle: 66°
- Capacity: 850 riders per hour
- G-force: 3.9
- Height restriction: 48 in (122 cm)
- Trains: 2 trains with 12 cars; riders arranged 2 across in a single row for a total of 24 riders per train
- Fast Lane available
- Renegade at RCDB

Renegade is an American wooden roller coaster at Valleyfair in Shakopee, Minnesota, that was designed by Great Coasters International. It was one of the first coasters built by Great Coasters International to use their Millennium Flyer trains, which are designed to give a smoother ride. Renegade's layout is a combination of an out-and-back and a twister roller coaster.

== Overview ==
Renegade stands 97.5 feet (29.7 m) tall with a first hill and ride maximum drop of 91 feet (28 m) at a maximum speed of 51.3 mph (82.6 km/h). The track is 3,113 feet (949 m) long, resulting in a ride time of approximately two minutes. The track was built at a cost of approximately $6.5 million. Two trains, consisting of 24 seats, accommodate 850 riders per hour.

This coaster has two rare features: the initial first drop and a high-speed station fly-by. The first hill of this coaster features an S-shaped drop. It initially goes down in one direction and at half-way twists in the opposite direction. Before the train comes back to the station it does a final high speed fly-by of the loading station. Since its opening, it is one of the most popular rides at Valleyfair.

It was featured on Discovery Channel's Build It Bigger program on July 10, 2007.

On October 17, 2025 a self-professed "superfan" celebrated his 30,000th ride on the roller coaster.

== Rankings ==
Golden Ticket Awards: Best New Ride for 2007
Ranking	4

Golden Ticket Awards: Top wood Roller Coasters
Year									1998	1999
Ranking									–	–
Year	2000	2001	2002	2003	2004	2005	2006	2007	2008	2009
Ranking	–	–	–	–	–	–	–	–	35 (tie)	45
Year	2010	2011	2012	2013	2014	2015	2016	2017	2018	2019
Ranking	42 (tie)	26	50	–	–	–	–	–	26	24
Year	2020	2021	2022	2023	2024	2025	2026			
Ranking	N/A	30	33 (tie)	37	43	50	47 (tie)			
