= Jimmy Hutmaker =

American roving ambassador and local celebrity

- Born: James Lee Hutmaker; April 18, 1932; New Germany, Minnesota
- Died: October 3, 2007 (aged 75); Excelsior, Minnesota
- Other name: "Mr. Jimmy"
- Occupation: Roving ambassador

Jimmy Hutmaker (April 18, 1932 – October 3, 2007), also known as "Mister Jimmy", was a celebrity in Excelsior, Minnesota until his death on October 3, 2007.

== Life ==
Hutmaker was born April 18, in 1932 in New Germany, Minnesota and moved with his family to Excelsior, Minnesota as a teenager. Despite unspecified developmental disabilities, Hutmaker had an outgoing demeanor and an engaging personality and was given the honorary title of "roving ambassador" for the city of Excelsior.

It was in this capacity that Hutmaker spent his days and nights wandering the streets of the city, chewing on a cigar, mumbling to himself, and greeting locals by name. Someone paid for business cards with this title for Mister Jimmy, and he carried them for the rest of his life. It is reported that he knew most Excelsior natives and their children by name, and also knew what churches they attended and their family history.

Local businesspeople provided for Hutmaker's needs, providing free meals and welcoming him in from the elements year round. However he was not a vagrant; he lived in his family home for most of his life, and until 2004 was cared for by his brother Ralph. After Ralph's death the responsibility of Jimmy's care was picked up by unrelated townspeople. He needed an escort to get out of the Excelsior nursing home he lived in, and residents of Excelsior stepped in and took him out daily.

== Rolling Stones legend ==
According to a legend, it was in his capacity as town ambassador that Hutmaker attended a concert by the Rolling Stones at the Danceland Ballroom at Excelsior Amusement Park in 1964. The next day Mick Jagger was having a prescription filled at Bacon's Drugstore when he encountered Hutmaker again. Hutmaker complained to Jagger that he had ordered a Cherry Coke but received a regular Coca-Cola instead, then dismissed his own complaint, saying "You can't always get what you want." Five years later, on their 1969 album Let It Bleed, the Stones released a song titled "You Can't Always Get What You Want" - and references to a drugstore, a cherry soda, a prescription, and "Mr Jimmy" (Hutmaker's nickname around town) all appear in the song. It is also told that Hutmaker just so happened to be ill, as it is said in the song. A shorter version of the song was released as the "B" side of "Honky Tonk Women" in 1969, and it was named as the 100th greatest song of all time by Rolling Stone magazine in its 2004 "500 Greatest Songs of All Time." Hutmaker's business cards had the lyrics to the song printed on their back sides.

The veracity of these claims is disputed. "Mr. Jimmy" more likely refers to Rolling Stones producer Jimmy Miller.
