= Xtreme Swing =

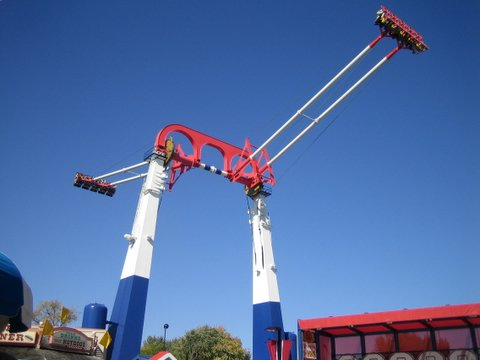
- Xtreme Swing in full operation

Valleyfair
- Coordinates: 44°47′56.71″N 93°27′25.32″W
- Status: Operating
- Cost: $6 million
- Opening date: 2006
- Replaced: Northern Lights (original)

Ride statistics
- Manufacturer: S&S Worldwide
- Model: Screamin' Swing
- Height: 100 ft (30 m)
- Drop: 125 ft (38 m)
- Speed: 60 mph (97 km/h)
- Capacity: 800 riders per hour
- Vehicles: 2
- Riders per vehicle: 40
- Rows: 2
- Riders per row: 20
- Duration: 1 minute
- Height restriction: 48 in (122 cm)
- Restraints: Lap bar
- Fast Lane available

Xtreme Swing is a thrill ride located at Valleyfair in Shakopee, Minnesota.

== Specifications ==
Xtreme Swing is a Screamin' Swing type ride built by S&S Worldwide. The structure itself is 100 feet (30 m) tall at its highest point, the equivalent height of a ten-story building. It consists of two swinging arms, both 84 feet (26 m) tall, seating 20 across and 20 back to back (40 total). At full swing, the ends of the arms approach 125 feet (38 m) high off the ground—as high as a twelve-story building—and achieve a maximum velocity of 60 miles-per-hour—faster than most wooden roller coasters. The ride lasts about one minute, and can accommodate 800 passengers per hour. Riders must be 48 inches (1,200 mm) or taller. Riders are restrained by a lap bar.

== See also ==
- Skyhawk, a similar ride that opened at Cedar Point the same year
