= Mild Thing =

Valleyfair
- Location: Valleyfair
- Coordinates: 44.799569°N 93.457505°W
- Status: Removed
- Opening date: 1976
- Closing date: 2010

General statistics
- Type: Steel – Junior
- Manufacturer: Allan Herschell Company
- Lift/launch system: Chain lift hill
- Capacity: 450 riders per hour
- Mild Thing at RCDB

Mild Thing was a junior roller coaster at the Valleyfair amusement park in Shakopee, Minnesota.

Mild Thing opened in 1976 as Mine Train. At some later point, the ride's name was changed to Kiddie Coaster, under which the ride was operated under until 1996. With the opening of the new hypercoaster Wild Thing, the ride's name was changed to Mild Thing, as a play on words.

Mild Thing ceased operation after the 2010 operating season and was replaced by Cosmic Coaster.
