= Screamin' Swing =

Type of pendulum amusement ride

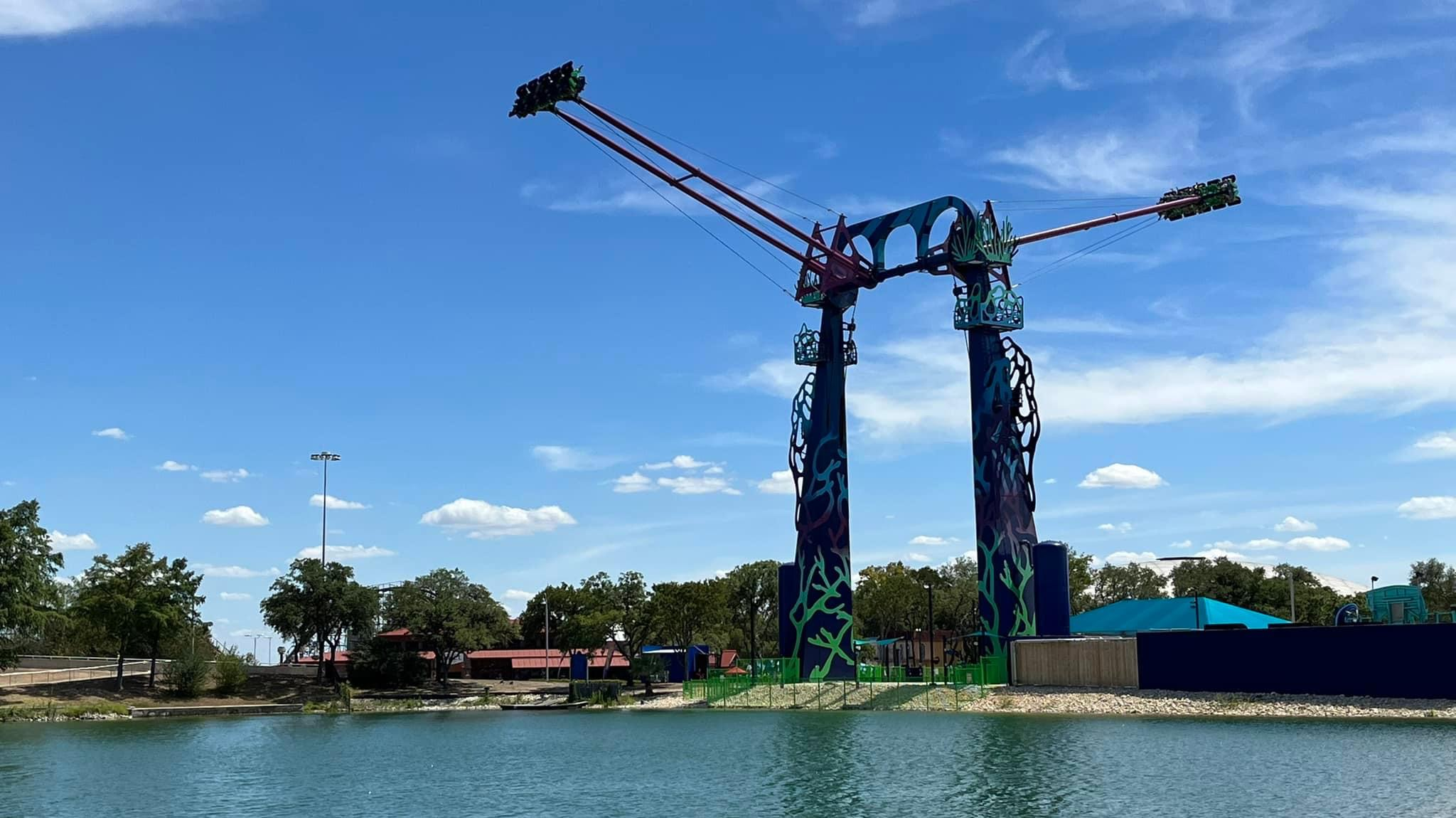
- Tidal Surge, a Screamin' Swing operating at SeaWorld San Antonio
- Status: In production
- First manufactured: 2004
- No. of installations: 16+
- Manufacturer: S&S Worldwide
- Vehicles: 2
- Restraint Style: Lap-bar
- Tallest model: Twizzler's Twisted Gravity

Screamin' Swing is a pneumatically powered pendulum ride designed and manufactured by S&S - Sansei Technologies. The ride was first installed and operated in 2004 at Knott's Berry Farm in Buena Park, California, United States.

On May 24, 2025, the tallest and fastest Screamin’ Swing in the world opened at Hersheypark.

== Design and operation ==
The original Screamin' Swing consists of a 62-foot-tall (19 m) A-frame, supporting two arms. Each arm supports two rows of seating, back to back. The first Screamin' Swings developed had four seats per arm with two arms. The lowest variant is the four-seat/one-arm design, and the capacities increase to 8 seat, 16 seat, 32 seat and 40 seat designs, all utilizing two arms. For two-arm models, the swings can operate individually or simultaneously (although in opposite directions) and are propelled by compressed air, provided by Ingersoll Rand or Sullair compressors. These compressors disperse air into tanks located within the arms, the movement triggering actuators and cables to produce the motion.

The first larger Screamin' Swing developed was Rush, located at Thorpe Park (UK). The ride stands at 62 feet (19 m) tall with a dynamic height of 70 feet (21 m). It opened in May 2005 as 'The World's Biggest Full Throttle Speed Swing'.

== Installations ==
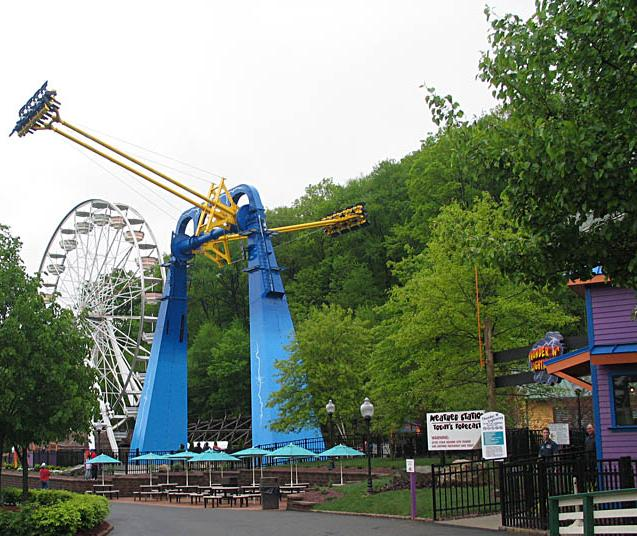
Thunder N' Lightning, a Screamin' Swing operating at Lake Compounce

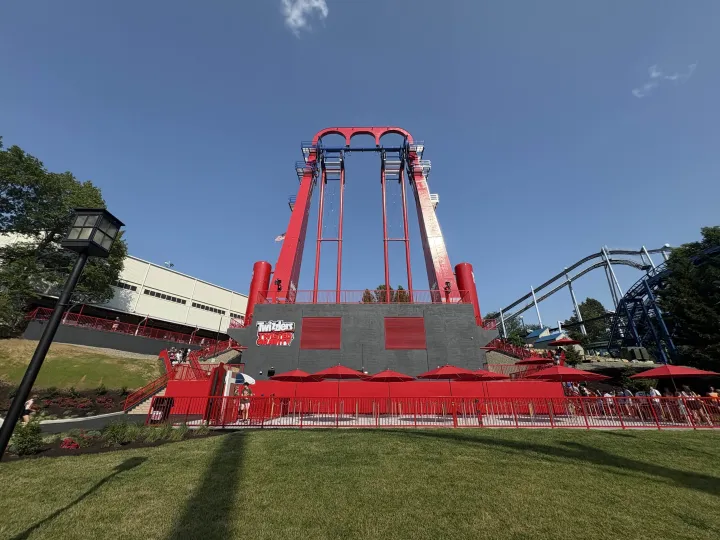
Twizzlers Twisted Gravity, a Screamin' Swing standing at Hersheypark

Name	Park	Location	Opened	Status
Screamin' Swing	Knott's Berry Farm	United States	2004	Removed
Screamin' Swing	Dorney Park & Wildwater Kingdom	United States	2005	Removed
Screamin' Swing	Family Fun Center	United States	2005	Operating
Flying Swing	Divo Ostrov	Russia	2005	Operating
Rush	Thorpe Park	United Kingdom	2005	Operating
Skyhawk	Cedar Point	United States	2006	Operating
Xtreme Swing	Valleyfair	United States	2006	Operating
Swing Shot	Kennywood	United States	2006	Operating
Thunder N' Lightning	Lake Compounce	United States	2006	Operating
Screamin' Swing	Morey's Piers	United States	2006	Operating
Screamin' Swing	Fun Spot America Atlanta	United States	2007	Operating
Giant Barn Swing	Silver Dollar City	United States	2007	Operating
Apollo's Swing	Mt. Olympus Water & Theme Park	United States	2007	Operating
Uppsvinget	Liseberg	Sweden	2007	Operating
Phoenix	Daytona Lagoon	United States	2008	Removed
Giant Canyon Swing	Glenwood Caverns	United States	2010	Operating
Hot Seat	Fun Spot America Kissimmee	United States	2017	Operating
Barnstormer	Dollywood	United States	2011	Operating
Swedish Swing	Scandia Amusement Park	United States	2012	Removed
Oozora Tengoku	Lake Sagami Pleasure Forest	Japan	2014	Operating
Hot Seat	Fun Spot America Orlando	United States	2015	Operating
Finnegan's Flyer	Busch Gardens Williamsburg	United States	2019	Operating
Tidal Surge	SeaWorld San Antonio	United States	2022	Operating
Serengeti Flyer	Busch Gardens Tampa Bay	United States	2023	Operating
Twizzlers Twisted Gravity	Hersheypark	United States	2025	Operating
Nutcracker	Lagoon (amusement park)	United States	2026	Operating
