= Karolinelund =

Public amusement park in Aalborg, Denmark

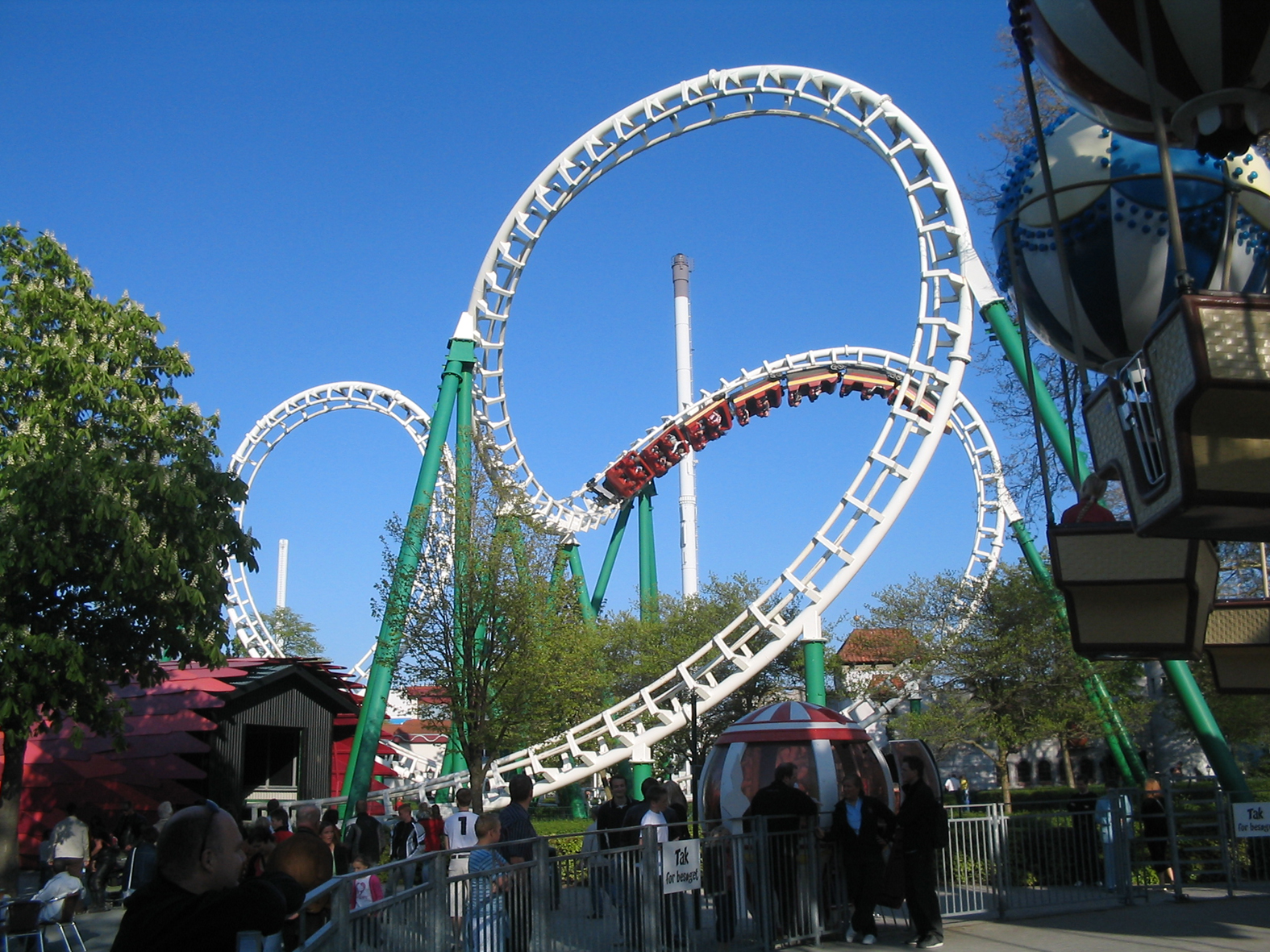
- Karolinelund
- Interactive map of Karolinelund
- Location: Aalborg, Denmark
- Coordinates: 57°2′36.21″N 9°55′53.90″E
- Opened: 1946
- Closed: 2010
- Owner: Aalborg Kommune

Attractions
- Total: 17

Karolinelund is a Danish public park located in Aalborg, Denmark, at the eastern end of the city centre. Until 2010, it hosted an amusement park.

== History ==
Karolinelund was founded in 1946 by the brothers Volmer and Carl Lind and was later owned by Franck Bo Lind. In 2005, Lind sold the park to Torben "Træsko" Pedersen, who owned amusement facilities at Dyrehavsbakken. After only one season, Pedersen sold the park to Aalborg Kommune on 23 January 2007.

The park was called Tivoliland from the 1970s to 2005. When Pedersen bought the park in 2005, he changed the name to Tivoli Karolinelund and it later became known as, simply, Karolinelund, the original name of the area where the park is located.

The amusement park closed after the 2010 season.
