= Jolly Roger Amusement Park =

Amusement park in Ocean City, Maryland

Jolly Roger
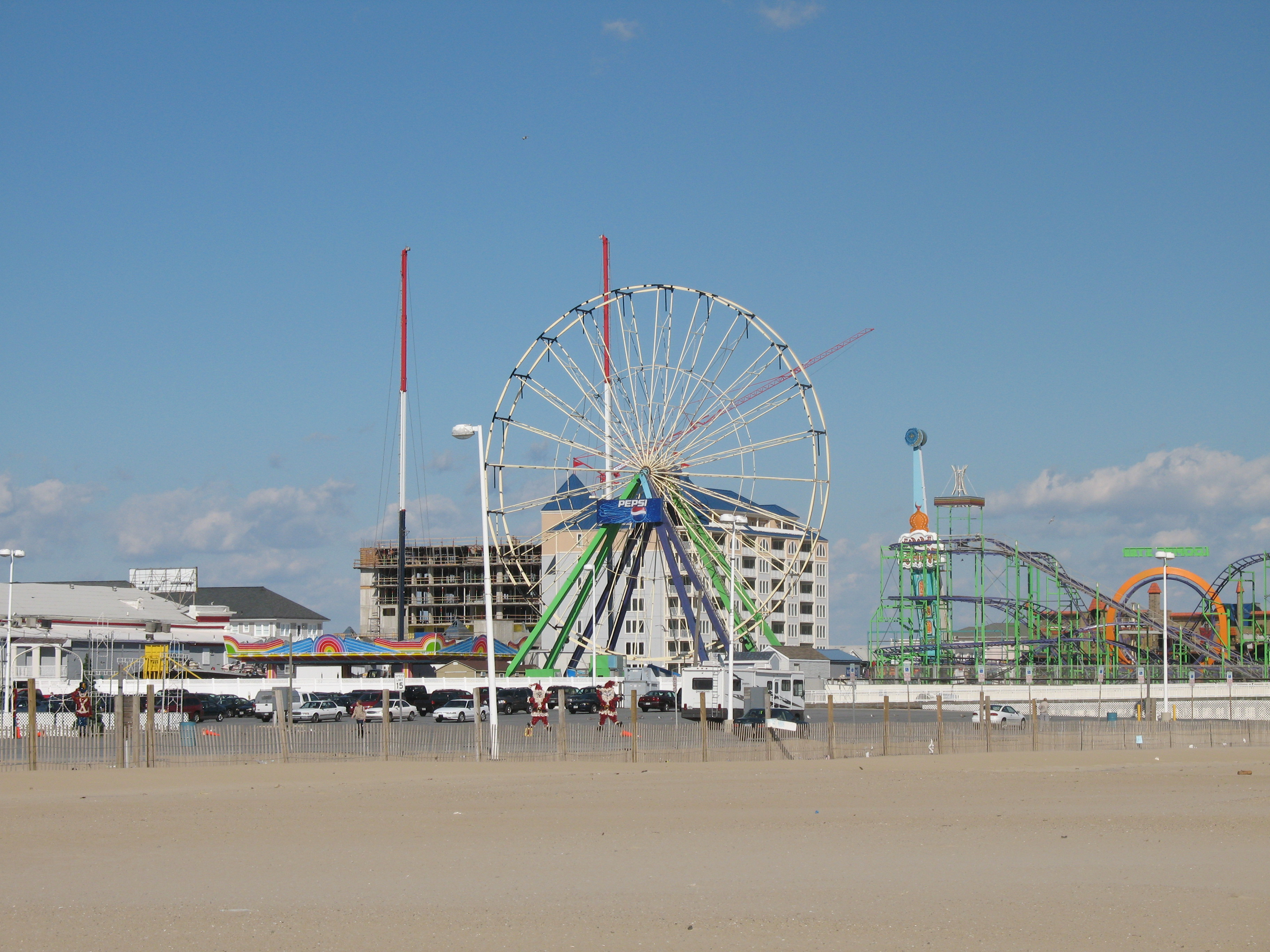
- Jolly Roger at The Pier
- Interactive map of Jolly Roger
- Location: Ocean City, Maryland, United States
- Coordinates: 38°21′35.8″N 75°4′35.5″W
- Opened: 1964
- Operating season: April–October

Attractions
- Total: 43
- Roller coasters: 4
- Water rides: 18
- Website: https://jollyrogerpark.com/

Jolly Roger Amusement Park is an amusement park located in Ocean City, Maryland. The park features two locations in Ocean City: one at the pier on the Ocean City boardwalk and one further uptown at 30th Street. Both locations feature numerous thrill rides, including a looping roller coaster at the pier, bumper cars, a ferris wheel, a carousel, and kiddie rides, among others. The parks also contain typical carnival-like games and eateries. The 30th Street location additionally features two eighteen-hole mini-golf courses, Splash Mountain, a full-service waterpark with many slides and activity pools, and 10 go-kart tracks.

== History ==
In 1964 Charles "Buddy" Jenkins collaborated with golfer Arnold Palmer to open the park initially as the Arnold Palmer Putting Course and Driving Range on 30th Street. 10 rides were added the next year. The Ocean City pier location was purchased by Jolly Roger in 1974.

== Pier Rides ==
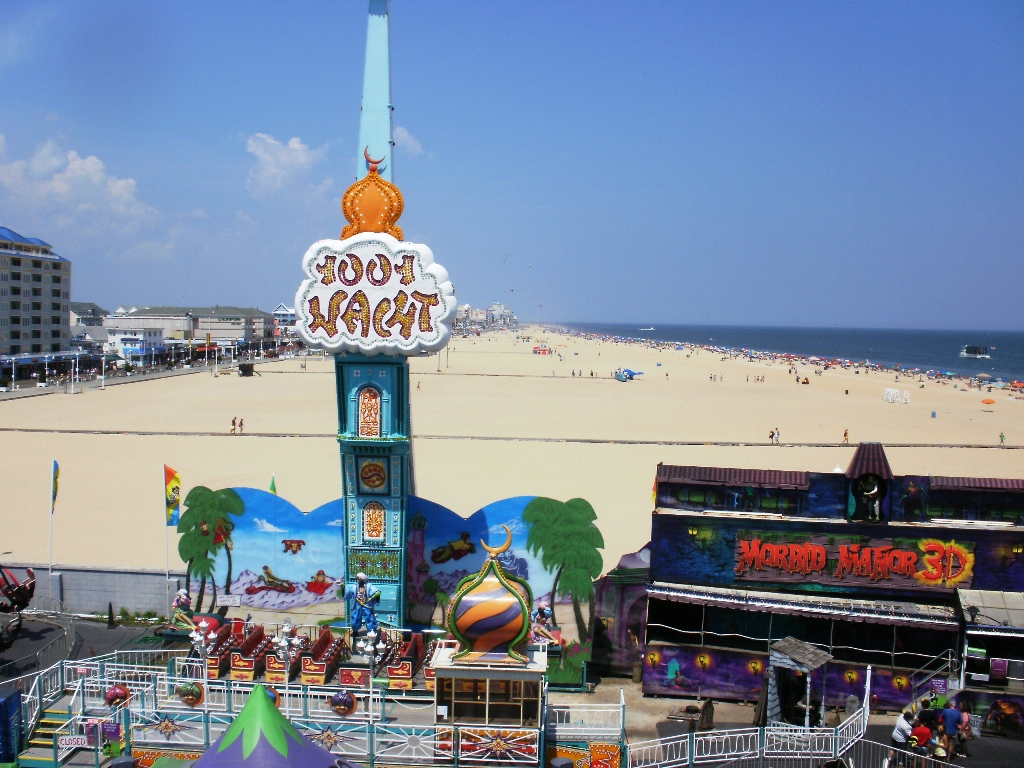
Jolly Roger at The Pier, located on the Ocean City beach

Jolly Roger at The Pier operates yearly from April–October and features a 108 foot tall ferris wheel, slingshot, looping rollercoaster, carnival games and more.

== 30th Street ==
Jolly Roger 30th Street is the main amusement park. The park is operated yearly from May–September. There are three roller coasters; Wacky Worm, The Barracuda, and WildCat. The 30th Street Park also has a 118-foot tall Ferris wheel, carnival games, and rides, as well as Speedworld, Splash Mountain, and Jolly Roger Mini Golf.

== Miniature Golf ==
Jolly Roger has two 18-hole miniature golf courses located at Jolly Roger's 30th Street Park, which have an operating season from April–October.

== Splash Mountain ==
Splash Mountain is Jolly Roger's waterpark at 30th Street, which operates from Memorial Day to Labor Day and has many attractions including:

- Eye of the Hurricane- one of the park's most popular rides features riders sliding down a steep slide and into a toilet-shaped funnel before exiting into the lazy river.
- Master Blaster- Roller coaster-style waterslide with riders going up and down and through a series of turns in tubes
- The stealth- slide similar to a half pipe, in which tubes travel down a steep slope and up the opposite side several times
- Six-Lane Super Racer- Guests race each other down six parallel slides on mats.
- The Rainforest- play area consists of numerous passageways lined with sprayers and water features which lead to slides. It also contains a giant pirate head that dumps water every few minutes
- Black Hole Slides- Riders slide down 3 partially and fully enclosed slides of varying intensity
- Wave pool- customary tidal pool where patrons swim in waves. The pool requires a life jacket for anyone under 60 inches, which is tightly monitored by staff.
- Lazy River- the park's lazy river winds through much of the park and is the run out for many of the park's most popular slides.

== SpeedWorld ==
SpeedWorld is Jolly Roger's center for go-kart racing activities, operating from April–October. It includes 10 race tracks designed for varying abilities and preferences.

SpeedWorld also is home to the park's new Zip line and adventure course, located above the tracks.
