= Valleyfair =

Amusement park in Minnesota, United States

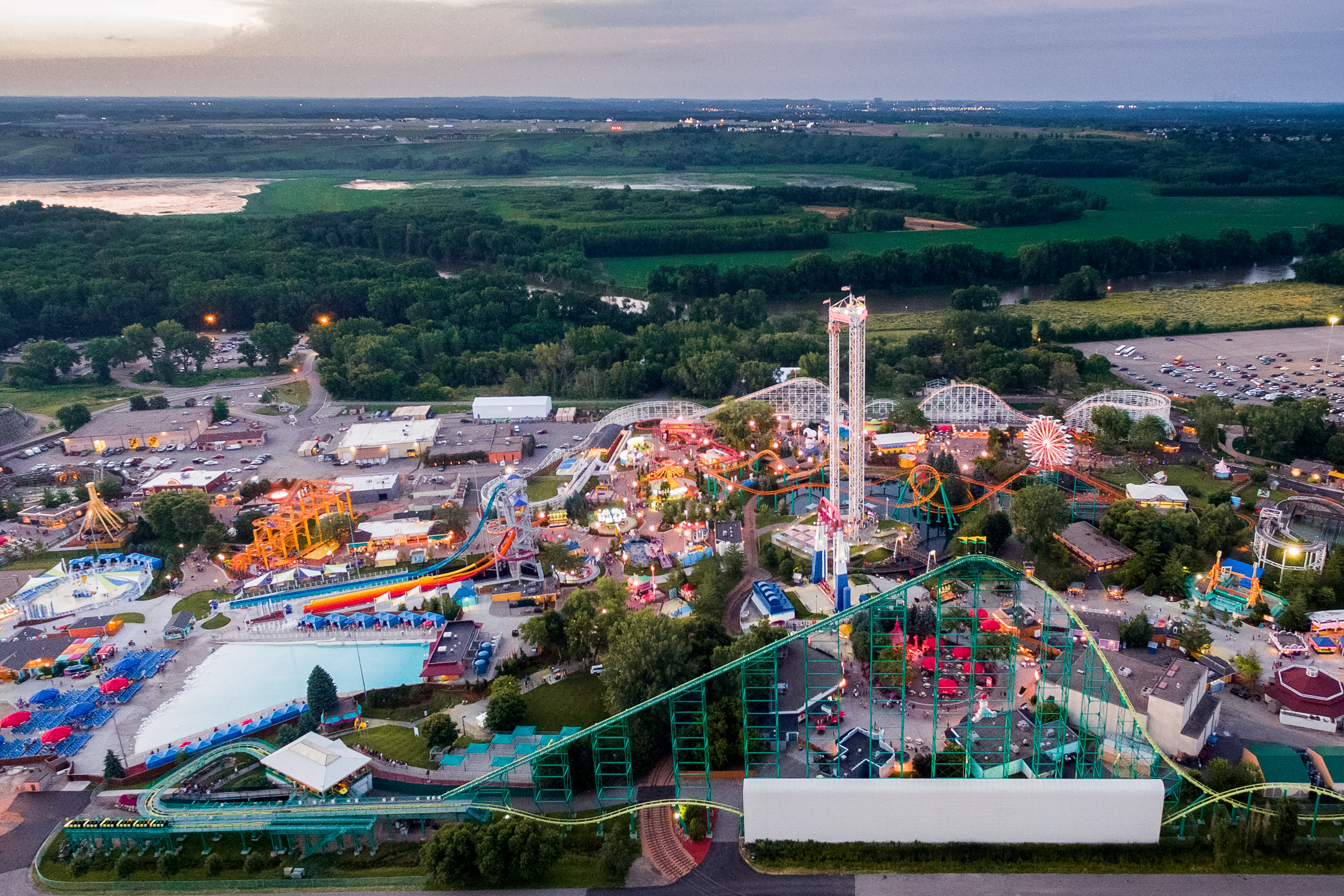
- Aerial view of Valleyfair
- Interactive map of Valleyfair
- Location: One Valleyfair Drive Shakopee, Minnesota, United States
- Coordinates: 44°47′55.47″N 93°27′12.13″W
- Opened: May 25, 1976
- Owner: EPR Properties
- Operated by: Enchanted Parks
- General manager: Stephen Summers
- Slogan: Fun for the Whole Family
- Operating season: May through October
- Area: 90 acres (0.36 km^{2})

Attractions
- Total: 41
- Roller coasters: 8
- Water rides: 2
- Website: valleyfair.enchantedparks.com

Valleyfair is a 90-acre (36 ha) amusement park in Shakopee, Minnesota, United States. Operated by Enchanted Parks, the park opened in 1976 and features over 40 rides including eight roller coasters and an included water park named Superior Shores. EPR Properties, a real estate investment trust, owns the park.

Cedar Point and Valleyfair were the first two parks in the Cedar Fair chain and a combination of the park names – "cedar" and "fair" – were used to name the original company. Cedar Fair merged into Six Flags in 2024, with the new company selling the park to EPR Properties in 2026.

== History ==
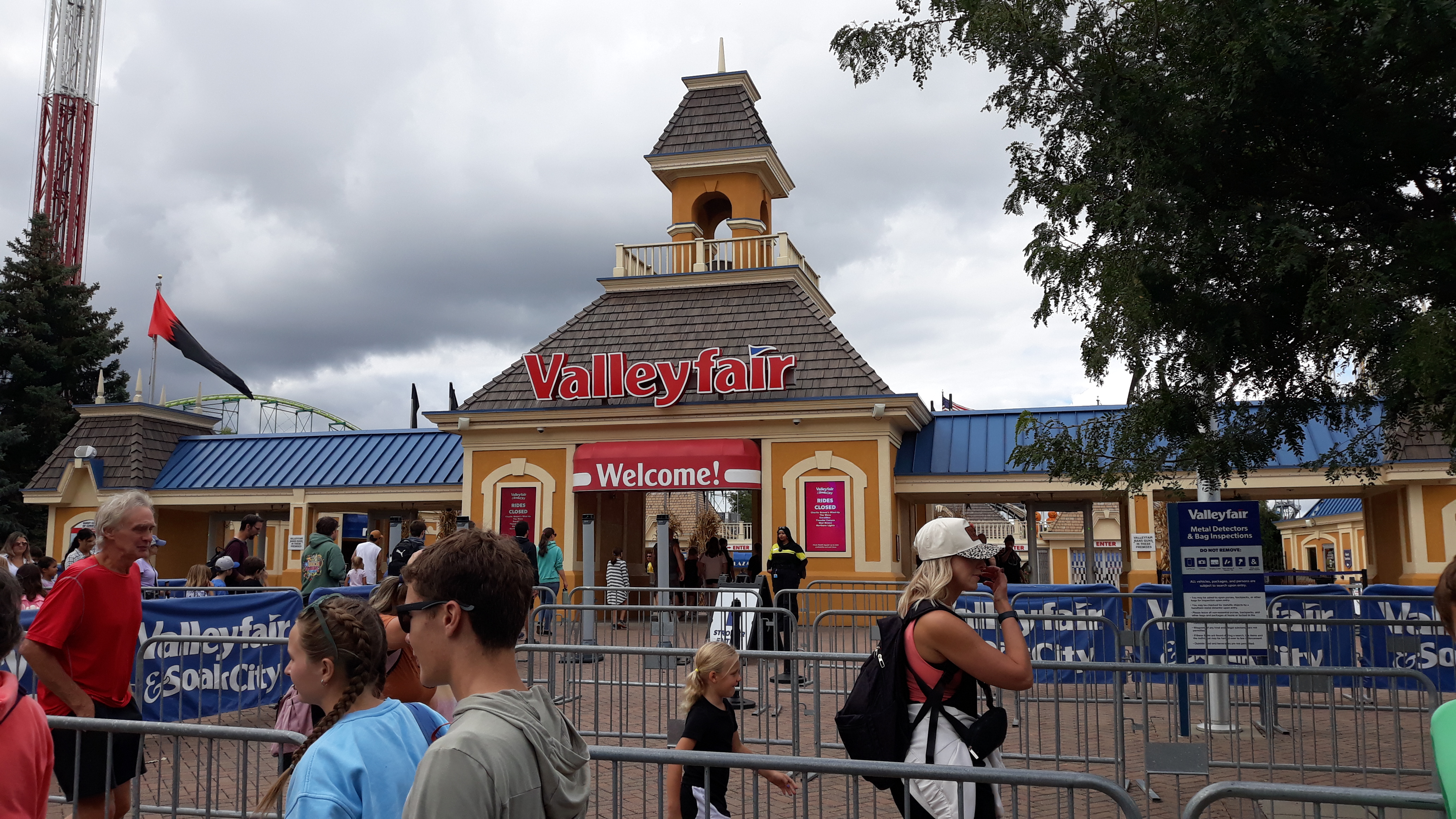
The entrance gate in 2025

Former logo used until 2007

Valleyfair opened on May 25, 1976, featuring 20 rides and attractions on 26 acres (110,000 m^{2}), with the roller coaster High Roller being the main attraction. The carousel in the park came from Excelsior Amusement Park which was closed in 1973. It is the oldest ride in the park. In 1978 in an effort to increase investment capital for continued park expansion, Valleyfair was acquired by Cedar Point in Sandusky, Ohio. Five years later, Cedar Fair Limited Partnership was formed as the parent company for Cedar Point and Valleyfair (the name being derived from the names of both properties). Since 1976, Valleyfair has invested over $96 million into the park, and today the park has over 75 attractions on 90 acres (36 ha) of land.

A height restriction was imposed in 2000 with the building of the Power Tower. After negotiations with the FAA and the nearby Flying Cloud Airport, the FAA restricted the building height of the Power Tower at 275 feet (84 m) due to its proximity to the airport. Power Tower's original plan was to be a height of 300 feet (91 m) and to take riders to 275 feet (84 m).

Valleyfair did not open for the 2020 season because of the COVID-19 pandemic in the United States, although it was reopened for the 2021 season.

On July 1, 2024, a merger of equals between Cedar Fair and Six Flags was completed, creating Six Flags Entertainment Corporation. This officially retired the Cedar Fair branding that was partially derived from Valleyfair. On March 5, 2026, Six Flags announced it would sell Valleyfair, Six Flags St. Louis, Great Escape, Worlds of Fun, Michigan's Adventure, and two other properties as part of a $331 million sale of seven parks in total to EPR Properties. Completed on April 6, 2026, the new operator of Valleyfair is Enchanted Parks. Valleyfair will retain its branding for the rest of 2026.

As the park is located on the banks of the Minnesota River, flooding can become an issue during the springtime months before the park usually opens (or when the park is open for the season), notably in 1988, 1993, 1997, 2014, 2018, 2019, and 2024. Excalibur and Thunder Canyon are built outside of a pre-existing river dike, and were built with this flooding potential in mind.

=== Attraction timeline ===
1970s
- 1976: Valleyfair opens with Antique Cars, Bumper Cars, Carousel, Ferris Wheel, Flying Trapeze, High Roller, Scrambler, SuperCat, and Wheel of Fortune
- 1977: Monster, Tilt-A-Whirl and Giant Tilt Ride (The only Super Tilt Model 14-car Tilt-A-Whirl ever built by Sellner Manufacturing) open
- 1978: Ye Olde Log Flume opens
- 1979: Enterprise, Kiddie Ferris Wheel and Wild Rails open
1980s
- 1980: Corkscrew opens
- 1981: Tot Town opens
- 1982: Pepsi IMAX theater opens, New entrance marquee
- 1983: Panic Falls Body Slides open in Liquid Lightning
- 1985: The Looping Starship and Bayern Curve open
- 1987: Thunder Canyon opens
- 1988: Two water slides (now known as Panic Falls Speed Slides) and Half Pint Park open
- 1989: Excalibur opens
1990s
- 1990: Minnesota River Valley Railroad opens
- 1991: Phase one of Challenge Park opens
- 1992: The Wave opens and two 18-hole golf courses added to Challenge Park
- 1993: Whitewater Country water park expansion; Bumper Boats added to Challenge Park
- 1994: Berenstain Bear Country opens
- 1995: Hydroblaster opens
- 1996: Wild Thing opens; RipCord added to Challenge Park
- 1997: Chaos opens
- 1998: Galaxy Theater opens
- 1999: Mad Mouse opens
2000s
- 2000: Power Tower and Frog Hopper open
- 2003: Steel Venom opens
- 2004: Foam Ball Factory and The Rockin' Tug added to KidWorks
- 2005: RipTide and Skyscraper open
- 2006: Xtreme Swing opens and Halloween Haunt occurs for the first time.
- 2007: Renegade opens
- 2008: Halloween Haunt is renamed Halloween Haunt at ValleyScare
- 2009: Re-theme of the water park to Soak City
2010s
- 2011: Planet Snoopy opens
- 2012: Fast Lane; Antique Cars closes
- 2013: Dinosaurs Alive!
- 2014: Route 76: Northern Lights opens, Scrambler and Tilt-A-Whirl relocated and Antique Cars to be re-added as Antique Autos; Pepsi IMAX theater and hydroblaster closes
- 2015: Soak City: New Slide Tower, New Children's Splash Pad; Subway relocated, Airbrush Tattoo stand closed
- 2016: Flying Eagles, All Wheels Extreme (Upgraded Amphitheater), New High Roller Trains, Subway Takes Place of Ben and Jerrys, 40th Anniversary Events, Enterprise closes
- 2017: North Star, a Funtime Starflyer swing ride, opens for 2017, New Caribou plaza
- 2018: Delirious, Larson International super loop, RipTide closes, New light package for Route 76, Snoopy's bounce house is removed, Free WiFi throughout the park.
- 2019: Superior Stage opens to host Peanuts Celebration, Updated Bathrooms, Variety of new food options, Dinosaurs Alive! and Looping Starship close.
2020s
- 2021: Grand Carnivale, a new event, launches in the park. ValleyScare announces it is ending after the 2021 season.
- 2022: TRICKS AND TREATS, a new event, launches in the park.
- 2023: A Chaperone Policy is implemented at the park.
- 2024: ValleySCARE's return is announced for the 2024 season.
- 2025: Panic Falls Body Slides close.
- 2026: Soak City is re-branded to Superior Shores; Coho Curl, Surgin' Sturgeon, Wild Walleye, and Pike Plunge open as part of waterpark expansion. Park celebrates 50th anniversary.

== Attractions ==
=== Roller coasters ===
Coaster	Picture	Year opened	Manufacturer	Description	Thrill Rating
Corkscrew		1980	Arrow Dynamics	A Looping Corkscrew roller coaster.	5
Cosmic Coaster		2011	Zamperla	A powered roller coaster. Previously located at Dorney Park & Wildwater Kingdom as Dragon Coaster.	3
Excalibur		1989	Arrow Dynamics	A mine train coaster with a wooden structure.	4
High Roller		1976	Opus Group	A wooden roller coaster. It is currently the oldest coaster at Valleyfair.	4
Mad Mouse		1999	Arrow Dynamics	A Mad Mouse coaster model.	4
Renegade		2007	Great Coasters International	A Wooden roller coaster.	4
Steel Venom		2003	Intamin	An Impulse roller coaster and the only one that still has a holding brake.	5
Wild Thing		1996	D. H. Morgan Manufacturing	A steel hyper coaster. It is currently the tallest roller coaster at Valleyfair and the very first roller coaster manufactured by Morgan.	5

=== Thrill rides ===
Ride	Year opened	Manufacturer	Description	Thrill Rating
Delirious	2018	Larson International	A Larson 22M Giant Loop Ride opening in the 2018 season.	4
Northern Lights	2014	Zamperla	A Disk'O Coaster flat ride where a single car travels along a 302-foot (92 m) long, U-shaped track, reaching a height of 43 feet (13 m).	4
North Star	2017	Funtime	A Star Flyer, in which riders, seated in two-person chair-linked swings, will reach a height of 230 feet (70 m), reaching speeds of 40 miles per hour (64 km/h).	4
Power Tower	2000	S&S Worldwide	A 275 feet (84 m) combo Space Shot and Turbo Drop tower.	5
Xtreme Swing	2006	S&S Worldwide	A Screamin' Swing ride. It is currently the second tallest of its kind.	5

=== Family rides ===
Ride	Year opened	Manufacturer	Description	Thrill Rating
Antique Autos	2014	Gould Manufacturing	Guests operated Antique Autos are powered by a gas-powered engine and travel around 1,500 feet of track with a center guide rail to keep the auto on track.	3
Bumper Cars	1976	Rauenhorst Corporation	A Bumper cars attraction.	4
Carousel	1925 (at Excelsior Park); 1976 (at Valleyfair)	Philadelphia Toboggan Coasters	An antique 48-horse Carousel. This ride previously was installed at Excelsior Park until its closing in 1973. An Artizan Band Organ provides the carousel's music, but the rolls have been converted to Wurlitzer 150 rolls. The carousel model number is PTC #76.	1
Charlie Brown's Wind Up	1976	Chance Rides Yo-Yo	The ride consists of 32 swings lift off the ground while travel in a circular motion and tilting at the top. It was originally called the Flying Trapeze, but received a facelift and renamed for Planet Snoopy.	3
Ferris Wheel	1975	Chance Rides	A classic Ferris wheel ride reaching 85 feet in the air.	2
Flying Ace Balloon Ride	1988	Zamperla Samba Balloon	Eight balloons that can accommodate up to 4 riders. It was originally called Hot Air Balloons.	2
Flying Eagles	2016	Larson International	A flying eagles ride with eight carriages that each have a paddle, enabling guests to change the movement of their carriage.	3
Minnesota River Valley Railroad	1990	Crown Metal Products	A 2 ft 6 in (762 mm) narrow gauge train ride around the park.	2
Monster	1977	Eyerly Aircraft Company	A classic Monster ride.	3
Scrambler	1976	Eli Bridge Company	A classic Scrambler ride.	3
SuperCat	1976	Ramagosa	A Caterpillar/Music Express style ride.	2
Tilter	1976	Sellner Manufacturing	A classic Tilt-A-Whirl ride.	3
Wheel of Fortune	1976	Chance Rides	A Trabant ride that holds 40 riders and raises to a tilted position while rotating backwards.	3

=== Water rides ===
These are the water rides besides those in Superior Shores.

Ride	Year opened	Manufacturer	Description	Thrill Rating
The Wave	1992	Hopkins Rides	A Shoot-the-Chutes water ride. There is a bridge at the bottom where visitors can get soaked.	4
Thunder Canyon	1987	Barr Engineering	A six-person River rafting ride	4

=== Planet Snoopy ===
Planet Snoopy is a kids area within the park created for the 2011 season as part of a $9 million expansion.

Ride	Year opened	Manufacturer	Model/Type	Description	Thrill Rating
Kite Eating Tree	2000	S&S Worldwide	Frog Hopper	A kiddie version of Power Tower. It was originally called the Frog Hopper.	2
Linus' Beetle Bugs	1976	Ramagosa		A little spinning ride. It was originally called Bumble Bees.	1
Linus Launcher	2011	Zamperla	Kite Flyer		3
Lucy's Tugboat	2004	Zamperla	Rockin' Tug		2
PEANUTS 500	2011	Zamperla	Speedway	A kiddie Whip ride	2
PEANUTS Playhouse				Play Place	1
PEANUTS Road Rally	2000	Zamperla	Convoy		1
Sally's Swing Set	2011	Zamperla	Happy Swing	A kiddie swing.	2
Snoopy vs. Red Baron	1988	Chance Rides		It was originally named Sea Planes.	2
Snoopy's Deep Sea Divers	2011	Zamperla	Crazy Bus		2
Snoopy's Rocket Express	2011	Zamperla	Aerial Ride	A kiddie monorail around Planet Snoopy	2
Woodstock Whirlybirds	2011	Zamperla	Mini Tea Cup	A kiddie spinning ride	2

=== Route 76 ===
Route 76 is an area of the park featuring three classic rides which made their debuts in the opening season of Valleyfair in 1976. These rides include the Antique Autos, which was formerly deconstructed to make room for the construction of Dinosaurs Alive!, the Tilt-a-Whirl, and the Scrambler. The area also includes new attraction named Northern Lights. The Route 76 area features a full-service catering and picnic area, titled Picnic Point. Route 76 is located in the front of the park near Steel Venom, and opened on May 16, 2014. In 2017, North Star, a 230-foot swing ride, was opened near the front of Route 76 near Tilt-a-Whirl. Debuting in 2018, 'Delirious', a 70-foot-tall looping flat ride is the newest addition to Route 76.

=== Superior Shores ===
Superior Shores is a water park included with the price of admission to Valleyfair. Rides include a lazy river, a wave pool, and water slides. Newly added slides such as "Breakers Plunge" were added as part of the 2015 water park expansion. In 2026, the Panic Falls body slides, original to the water park when it opened in 1983, were closed and replaced by a new water slide tower consisting of the Coho Curl, Surgin' Sturgeon, Wild Walleye, and Pike Plunge water slides. That same year, the water park added a kiddie section and rebranded from the previous Soak City name, which it had used since 2009.

== Fast Lane ==
Fast Lane is Valleyfair's virtual queue system. For an additional charge, visitors get a wrist band that enables them to get to the front of the line on twenty of Valleyfair's' most popular attractions without queuing including attractions like Wild Thing, Renegade, Steel Venom, Xtreme Swing, and some attractions in the Superior Shores water park.

== Shows ==
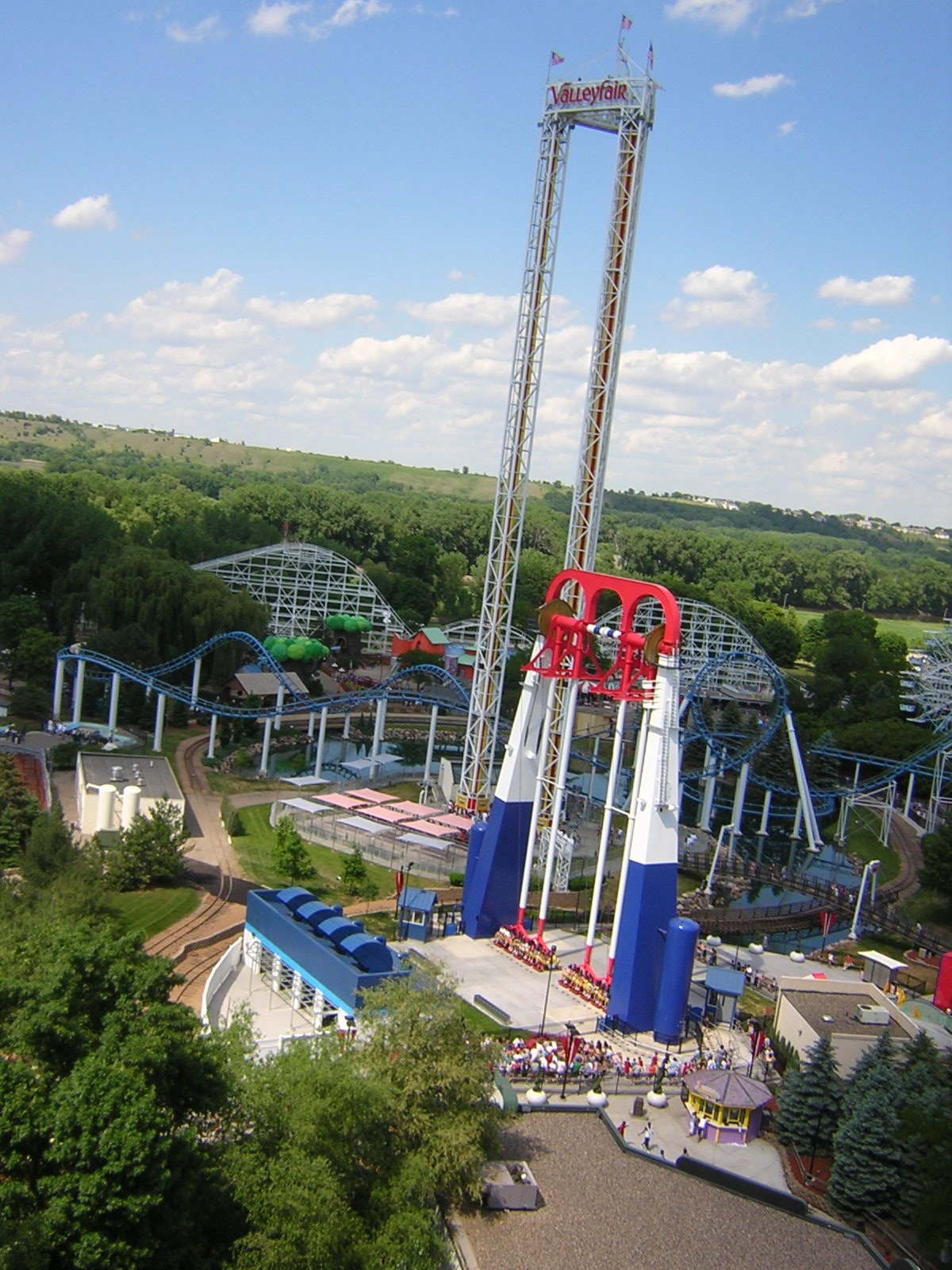
Power Tower, Xtreme Swing, and Corkscrew from Wild Thing

Valleyfair hosts several performance venues with a wide variety of live entertainment at no additional charge.

- The Amphitheater is a large outdoor venue that has hosted country music tribute shows, battle of the bands competitions, acrobats, and even a dog show. In 2016, the Amphitheater was remodeled and began hosting a new show, All Wheel's Extreme.
- The Galaxy Theater is an indoor theater. Originally, it was used to stage musical revues, but in recent years, The Galaxy has played host to various comedy and magic acts, such as Rudy Coby, Ed Alonzo, Chipper Lowell, and All-Star Stunt Dogs. Galaxy Theater has remained closed to the public since 2020, due to the COVID-19 Pandemic.
- The Gazebo Stage is an outdoor stage with a covered bandstand which presents a musical revue of classic and contemporary hits. The Gazebo features a 7-piece live band (keyboard, bass, guitar, drums, and vocals).
- Benchwarmers is a roaming brass band that strolls throughout the park and plays many classic songs as well as some more contemporary music. Some songs from previous years have been, "Thriller" and "Sweet Caroline".
- PEANUTS Showplace is an outdoor venue that is next to the PEANUTS Playhouse in Planet Snoopy. It features stadium bench seating.
- Superior Stage is an outdoor venue near the Ferris Wheel and Corkscrew rides. This outdoor stage opened in 2019 and is equipped with high-tech lighting and display screens. Superior Stage features Snoopy related shows like Peanuts Block Party as well as other entertainment during the summer such as Neon Nights and multiple shows for Tricks and Treats.
- The Vocal Coasters are a 6-piece vocal group that performs mainly a cappella with a beat-boxing background.
- The Squiggles were a kids' quintet that sang from 2004 to 2010.

Valleyfair also hosts Performance in the Park, which allows high school performance groups to showcase their abilities inside of the park and receive tickets at a special group rate. Marching bands march on a predetermined loop throughout the park and the Midway and Superior Stages are utilized for other performances. Most performances are 30 minutes or less, which allows students time to enjoy the park.

== Former rides and attractions ==
- Berenstain Bear Country (1994–2003) – A themed children's area with a variety of indoor and outdoor attractions covering one acre. According to a press release from Valleyfair, it "features several different theme areas, each from the storybooks. Included is a 32-foot-tall walk-in treehouse with three levels...there also will be the Spooky Old Tree.” Berenstain Bear Country also featured a miniature railroad, playground structures, and a large sandbox.
- KidWorks (2004–2010) – A re-themed children's area located on the same site as Berenstain Bear Country. It added the Foam Ball Factory and Rockin' Tug to the area, both of which still remain in the park today. It also featured the addition of a small hedge maze and a Koi pond. The park's former mascot, Colonel Ohoompapa, would make regular appearances in the area. KidWorks was revamped as a part of the Planet Snoopy expansion in 2011, which saw the removal of the hedge maze, Kidworks Railway, and other remnants of Berenstain Bear Country that still remained.
- Half Pint Park (1988–2010) – A children's area located near the entrance of High Roller. The area featured several attractions that have been removed, including the Lil' Guppy, Rub-a-Dub Tubs, Busy Boats, a climbing area, and the Kiddie Train. The area was also home to an upcharge bungee trampoline attraction called Xtreme Trampoline in 2005. Half Pint Park was revamped as a part of the Planet Snoopy expansion in 2011.
- Corkscrew TotSpot (–2010) – A set of three rides for small children located between The Wave and the entrance to Corkscrew, including Kiddie U-Turn, Kiddie Carousel, and Moon Buggies. The Corkscrew TotSpot was removed in 2010 as a part of the Planet Snoopy expansion in 2011.
- Northern Lights (1986–2005) – A Chance Rides Falling Star ride with a space theme, removed in 2005 to make room for Xtreme Swing.
- Bayern Curve (1985–1997) – A Schwarzkopf Bayern Kurve ride, located next to Northwoods Grill, replaced with numerous attractions over the years, with Wheel of Fortune currently residing on its former site.
- Wild Rails (1979–1998) – Schwarzkopf WildCat coaster, replaced in 1999 with Mad Mouse. Moved to Jolly Roger Amusement Park in Maryland under the name Wildcat.
- SkyScraper (2005–2007) – A Gravity Works SkyScraper ride located near the front of the park within Wild Thing's figure-eight turnaround. It originally operated at Dorney Park & Wildwater Kingdom from 2000 to 2004, and was eventually relocated to Cedar Point where it operated from 2008 to 2015. SkyScraper was an upcharge attraction.
- Tot Town (1981–1999) – A themed area featuring rides, a jungle gym and ball pit designed for small children. It was accessed via a suspension bridge that crossed over the park's central lagoon. Tot Town was removed in 1999 to make room for Power Tower, which reuses the suspension bridge for its ride entrance.
- The Flume (1979–2008) – Known as Ye Olde Log Flume until the early 1990s, the Flume was a log flume ride. The Flume was permanently closed and dismantled at the end of the 2008 season. Soak City waterpark (previously Whitewater Country waterpark) was extended in place of the Flume to accommodate the installation of Breakers Bay, a wave pool attraction.
- Bumper Boats (1993–2010) – An upcharge Bumper boats ride, a part of the Challenge Park located near the front of Valleyfair. The Bumper Boats closed in 2009 and were removed in 2010. This ride was relocated to Michigan's Adventure.
- Mild Thing (1976–2010) – A children's roller coaster, originally called Mine Train and Kiddie Coaster prior to the park's addition of Wild Thing, located in Half Pint Park. Mild Thing closed in 2010 as part of Valleyfair's revamping of the children's area into Planet Snoopy, and was replaced by Cosmic Coaster.
- Chaos (1997–2010) – A Chance Rides Chaos ride, which starts spinning in a horizontal position and gradually lifts into a vertical position. Each individual ride unit flips 360 degrees on its own axis. Chaos was removed prior to the 2011 season.
- Skipper and Dolly Dolphin Show (1977? – late 1980s) – A dolphin show featuring two Bottlenose dolphins named Skipper and Dolly. Given that the dolphins could not be properly housed there during the frigid Minnesota winter months and that various other amusement parks had their own "Skipper and Dolly" dolphin shows (such as Pontchartrain Beach and Six Flags AstroWorld), it can be assumed the two animals were transferred from location to location, depending on whichever parks wanted to incorporate the dolphins into their summertime show schedules.
- Adventure Golf (1992–2012) – Two upcharge 18-hole mini-golf courses, a part of the Challenge Park located near the front of Valleyfair. Its last operating season was 2011, and it was closed to the public during the 2012 season. The area was replaced with Valleyfair's catered event area, named Picnic Point.
- Antique Cars (1976–2012) – A 1148 ft track featuring self-controlled, gas-powered replicas of 1910 Cadillac Touring Cars. It was removed to build Dinosaurs Alive! It has returned in a different format in the new Route 76 area.
- Go-Karts (1991–2013) – A quarter mile go-kart race track located in the Challenge Park. The Go-Karts were an upcharge attraction. The area was replaced with the Antique Autos ride as a part of the Route 76 expansion in 2014.
- Pepsi IMAX Theater (1982–2013) – An indoor theater building located near Mad Mouse which featured several daily showings of IMAX films. The film being shown in the theater changed from season to season. The theater was demolished to make way for Barefoot Beach in 2015.
- Hydroblaster (1995–2013) – Two dark dinghy slides near Planet Snoopy. The area was replaced with the addition of Breakers Plunge and Breakers Pipeline to Soak City in 2015.
- Enterprise (1979–2016) – A HUSS Enterprise type ride. Closed in 2016 to make room for North Star.
- RipTide (2005–2017) – A HUSS Top Spin ride where riders get sprayed by a fountain during the ride. Closed prior to the 2018 season.
- Snoopy's Moon Bounce (2011–2017) – A bounce house attraction located in Planet Snoopy which featured a large inflatable Snoopy dressed as an astronaut. It was removed prior to the 2018 season.
- Dinosaurs Alive! (2013–2019) – An upcharge walkthrough attraction where you could see dinosaur animatronics along a trail. It closed at end of 2019 season.
- Looping Starship (1985–2019) – An Intamin Looping Starship ride where riders would gain momentum and spin upside down in a pirate themed ship. The ride closed at end of 2019 season.
- Snoopy's Junction (1994–2022) – A Dotto Trains Kiddie Trains. The ride closed at the end of the 2022 season. It closed unexpected in 2022 with no announcement from the park. The train has since been demolished.
- RipCord (1996–2024)-An upcharge attraction known as a sky coaster, that drops riders in a swinging pendulum-like motion, originally it was a part of the Challenge Park section of Valleyfair, after most of the rest of what was known as Challenge Park was removed, it still stood, and was made a part of Route 76, it's since been dismantled.

== Halloween Haunt at ValleySCARE ==

The Halloween Haunt is a Halloween event at Valleyfair that was originally known as HalloWeekends, which operated from 1998 to 2000 on weekends in September. The name was changed to Halloween Haunt when the event was brought back six years later in 2006. The Great Pumpkin Fest is a family-friendly Halloween event open during the day, while the park is under normal operation. At night, the Halloween Haunt would take over and featured haunted houses, outdoor mazes, scare zones, and live entertainment. Many rides remained in operation during the event, though some were closed to accommodate the transition. Valleyfair announced that the Halloween Haunt would not return for the 2022 operating season on February 25, 2022.

On April 2, 2024, Valleyfair announced the return of ValleySCARE for the 2024 operating season, with it now being a separate ticketed event in the evenings. The event will run on select weekends in September and October.

=== Tricks and Treats ===
Planet Spooky was added to the ValleySCARE lineup in 2011 with the park's addition of Planet Snoopy. However, daytime family-friendly activities were present prior to the Planet Spooky name. In 2015 it was renamed to The Great Pumpkin Fest. In 2022, the family-friendly Halloween event was renamed again to "Tricks and Treats". Tricks and Treats features a family oriented halloween event with multiple shows and performances from characters, trick or treating, four themed areas, and multiple events aimed at a younger audience. It was announced on March 14, 2024, that Tricks and Treats would be returning for the 2024 season.

=== Haunted attractions ===
Attraction	Type	Opened	Location
Berserkers: Valkyrie's Vengeance	Maze	2024	Near High Roller
Blood on the Boundary Waters	Scare Zone	2019-2021, 2024	Near High Roller (Formerly walkway between Midway Games and Bumper Cars)
CarnEVIL: Midway of Mayhem	Scare Zone	2024	Planet Snoopy
The Chateau: 7 Deadly Scares	Maze	2024	Behind Mad Mouse
Cryptidland	Maze	2024	Near Depot Refreshments
Hemlock Coven	Scare Zone	2025	Near Mad Mouse
Mr. Cleavers Bloodshed	Maze	2008-2021, 2024	Near Mad Mouse in games warehouse
Signal Zero	Scare Zone	2024	Near The Wave
Undertakers	Maze	2018-2021, 2024	Site formerly known as Picnic Cove

==== Former haunted attractions ====
Attraction	Type	Opened	Location
Abnormal Alley	Scare Zone	2012-2016	Corkscrew alley
Beserkers Unleashed (Re-themed to Berserkers: Valkyrie's Vengeance in 2024)	Maze	2017-2021	Near High Roller
Blood Creek Cemetery (Re-themed to Undertakers Maze in 2018)	Scare Zone	2006-2017	Walkway between The Wave & Monster
Camp Wekilou	Maze	2011-2014	Site formerly known as Picnic Cove
Carnage at Crimson Isle	Maze (Scare Zone in 2006)	2006-2012	Plaza Patio near Pepsi IMAX Theatre
CarnEvil in 3D (Re-themed to CarnEvil: Ringmaster's Revenge Scare Zone in 2013)	Maze	2006-2012	Midway Games
CarnEvil: Ringmaster's Revenge (Maze until replaced by Zombie High in 2013)	Scare Zone	2013-2021	Planet Snoopy
The Chateau (Formerly Chateau du Damné, Re-themed to The Chateau: 7 Deadly Scares in 2024)	Maze	2006-2021	Behind Mad Mouse
Dark Harvest (Formerly Hellside Farm)	Maze	2007-2019	Site formerly known as Picnic Cove
Darkness Awaits	Scare Zone	2019-2019	Near Renegade
Demon Corps Sliders	Scare Zone and Roaming	2017-2021	Park Wide and The Wave
Dinoslaughter	Scare Zone	2015-2015	Dinosaurs Alive!
Festival of Freaks (Re-themed to Abnormal Alley in 2012)	Scare Zone	2011-2011	Planet Snoopy
Human(e) Habitat	Maze	2015-2017	Site formerly known as Picnic Cove
London Terror	Maze	2013-2015	Soak City Waterpark
Mangler Asylum	Maze	2006-2015	Bumper Cars
MaSCAREade	Scare Zone	2018-2021	Walkway between The Wave & Monster
Trails End	Scare Zone	2015-2018	Near Renegade
Zombie High (Zombie High: In The Dark in 2018, re-themed to Cryptidland in 2024)	Maze	2013-2021	Near Depot Refreshments

== Incidents ==
- On June 28, 1994, an 11-year-old girl was injured while attempting to exit The Flume. She reportedly became frightened as the boat was about to climb the 45-foot-tall (14 m) lift hill and tried to get off the boat. A second boat pinned her underwater. Park staff performed first aid on the victim before paramedics arrived, and she was taken to a nearby hospital where she was reported to be in critical condition.
- On May 21, 2006, the rear car of a roller coaster train on Wild Thing detached from the middle car during the final brake run. 18 people were injured and 14 were taken to a local hospital, though most injuries were considered minor. An investigation later determined that a mounting bracket in the brake system failed, and the ride resumed operation on June 1, 2006.
- On September 3, 2007, the ride Xtreme Swing experienced a fire in an electrical junction box. There were no injuries, and the ride reopened several days later after the problem was fixed and the ride successfully tested.
- On August 5, 2010, a chlorine leak from the Soak City Waterpark sent 26 people to the hospital.
- On June 16, 2011, the ride Minnesota River Valley Railroad derailed near the amphitheater at the front of the park and careened into the south train station platform. Two passenger cars left the tracks and were later placed back on the tracks by park maintenance. No injuries were reported.
- On September 20, 2012, an employee became trapped under a carriage from Power Tower after it fell while he was performing maintenance on the ride. The 41-year-old operator sued the manufacturer, S&S - Sansei Technologies.
- On November 21, 2015, a fire was started at a storage building (haunt attraction London Terror). 25% of the structure was damaged, the cause of the fire is unknown. Fabric Ceiling needed replacing. No injuries reported.
- On May 25, 2017, Numerous fights broke out during Valleyfair's first ever “Adult Night,” a kid-free event for adults. Fights took place mostly in the parking lot but some fights did occur in the park. Nobody was injured. One person was cited for disorderly conduct.
- On the evening of September 22, 2018, police were forced to close the “ValleySCARE” event early after a large number of fights broke out. At least three people were cited for offences. Multiple police departments along with a police helicopter assisted with evacuating the park along with Valleyfair security personnel.
- On May 29, 2023, a large altercation occurred in the parking lot of Valleyfair. Multiple police departments from the area responded to assist with crowds, and one juvenile was transported to the hospital.

== In popular culture ==
- Valleyfair appeared in a scene in the baseball film Little Big League, with rides such as Corkscrew, Enterprise, High Roller, and The Wave being visible in the scene.
- Yam Haus, a Minneapolis pop band, filmed a music video for its song “The Thrill” in 2019 at Valleyfair. The video shows rides and attractions such as Wild Thing, Power Tower, Antique Autos, Corkscrew, North Star, High Roller, Extreme Extreme Swing, the Route 76 area at night, the Midway Games area, the Cotton Candy stand, and the three-point basketball challenge.

== See also ==
- Excelsior Amusement Park operated in the region from 1925 to 1973. The carousel from Excelsior now stands inside the Valleyfair entrance.
- Minnesota River
