= Mill Race (log flume) =

Former log flume ride at Cedar Point

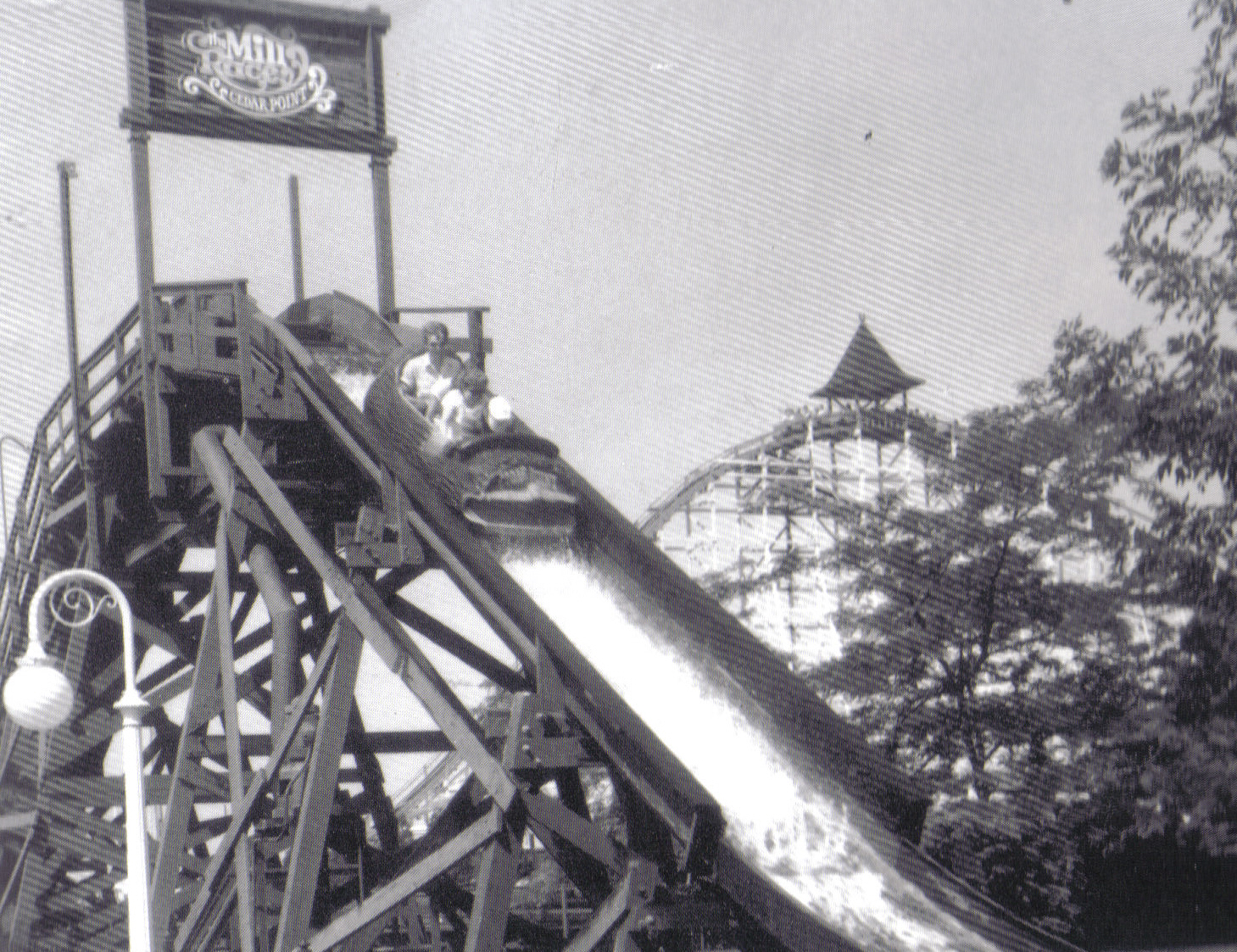
- Mill Race in the mid 1960s

Cedar Point
- Status: Removed
- Cost: $300,000
- Opening date: 1963
- Closing date: 1993
- Replaced by: Raptor

General statistics
- Type: Log flume
- Manufacturer: Arrow Development
- Height: 28 ft (8.5 m)
- Length: 1,230 ft (370 m)

Mill Race was a log flume ride that operated between 1963 and 1993 at the Cedar Point amusement park in Sandusky, Ohio.

Opened in 1963, just months after El Aserradero [The Sawmill] at Six Flags Over Texas, it was the world's second log flume ride. In 1993, it was dismantled to make room for the Raptor roller coaster.

== History ==
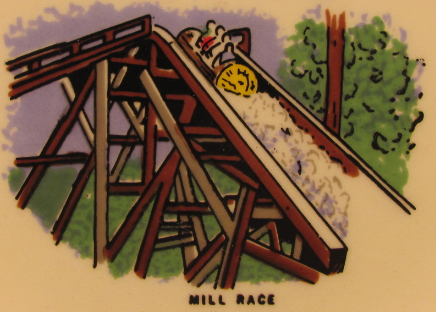
Illustration of Mill Race from a park souvenir

Built by Arrow Development for about $300,000 ($3,081,196 today), Mill Race opened during a period of transition at Cedar Point. In 1963, when Mill Race opened, Cedar Point had no operating roller coasters besides smaller wild mouse style roller coasters. Mill Race opened near the entrance of the park on the main midway and it proved to be one of the most popular rides in the entire park. The number of Cedar Point visitors rose following the installation of Mill Race.

Although Mill Race was popular, the log flume was ultimately removed in 1993 to prepare for the addition of the inverted steel roller coaster Raptor. A second log flume ride, White Water Landing, had also been built at Cedar Point in 1982. At 50 feet (15 m) in height, White Water Landing dwarfed the 28 feet (8.5 m) tall Mill Race. Snake River Falls, a third flume, opened in Mill Race's last year of operation. In the year following Mill Race's removal and Raptor's installation, Cedar Point admissions went from hundreds of thousands of visitor admissions to over two million visitor admissions in a single season.

== Layout and ride experience ==
Mill Race had a simple layout, only having a single lift hill of 28 feet (8.5 m) in height. Mill Race had been selected as a top Cedar Point attraction in multiple years of the 1960s.
