= Wilderness Run =

Steel children's roller coaster at Cedar Point

- Previously known as Jr. Gemini
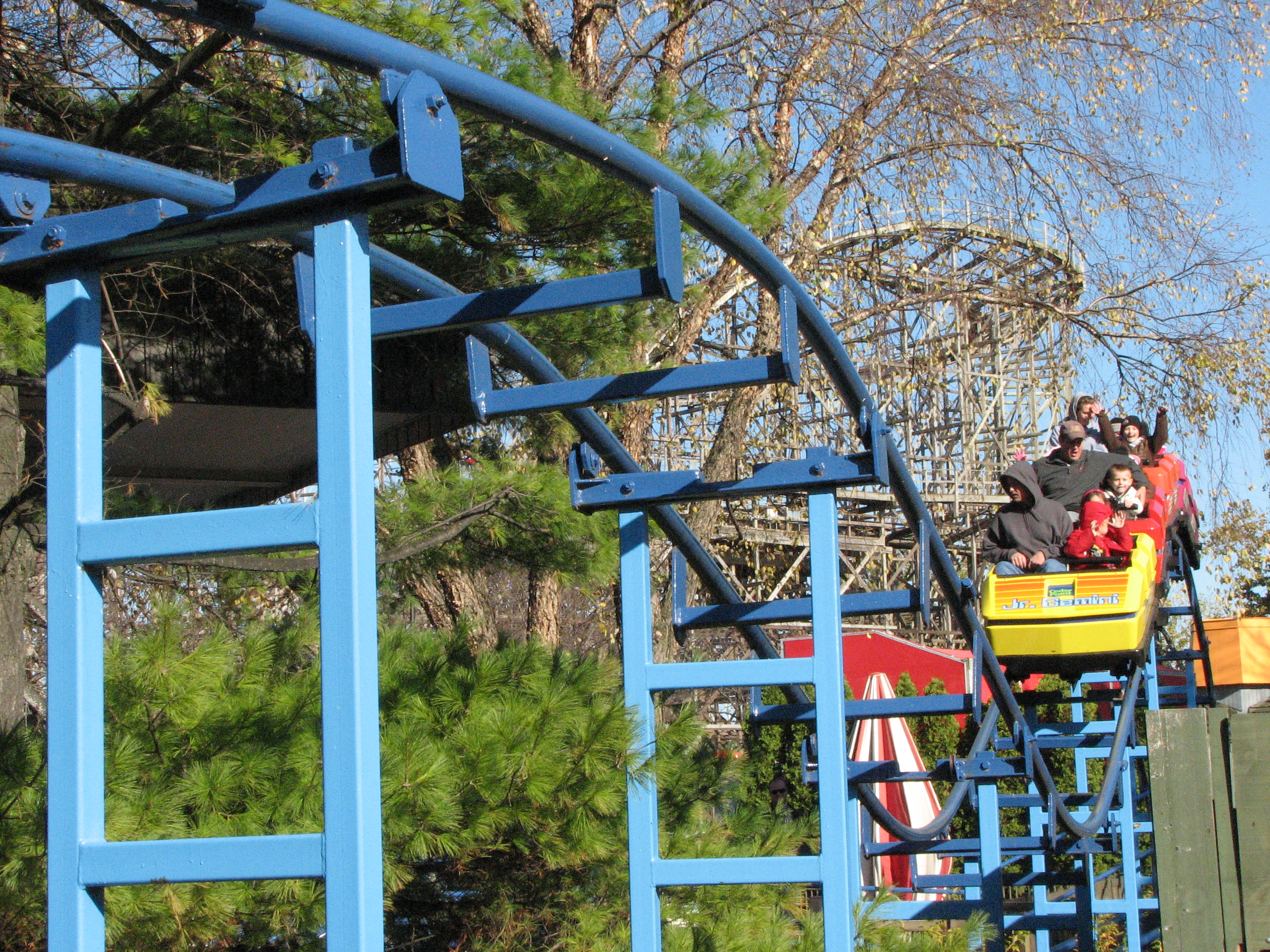
- Jr. Gemini's train going over small hill. Final turn in the foreground.

Cedar Point
- Location: Cedar Point
- Park section: Camp Snoopy
- Coordinates: 41°29′8.25″N 82°41′19″W
- Status: Operating
- Opening date: 1979

General statistics
- Type: Steel
- Manufacturer: Intamin
- Model: Children's coaster
- Lift/launch system: Chain lift hill
- Height: 19 ft (5.8 m)
- Length: 443 ft (135 m)
- Speed: 6 mph (9.7 km/h)
- Inversions: 0
- Duration: 0:50
- Height restriction: 36 in (91 cm)
- Trains: Single train with 4 cars; riders arranged 2 across in 2 rows for a total of 16 riders per train
- Wilderness Run at RCDB

Wilderness Run (formerly Jr. Gemini) is a steel kiddie roller coaster built by Liechtensteiner coaster manufacturer Intamin at Cedar Point in Sandusky, Ohio. Built in 1979, it was previously named Jr. Gemini, after the ride that sits across the midway from it, Gemini. In 2014, Cedar Point renovated the Gemini Midway, including Wilderness Run. The ride was repainted and renamed to match the theme of the Camp Snoopy children's area. After exiting the 19-foot-tall lift hill, the coaster train goes through a 270-degree turn to the left, followed by a small hill over the beginning of the lift hill. The train then goes through a 270-degree turn to the right which leads to the station.

== Structure and colors ==
The ride is made of tubular steel with brown steel supports and green track. The queue goes underneath the last bunny hill of the roller-coaster. The train is painted orange and yellow with a red stripe.

As Jr. Gemini, the ride had all blue track and supports with a multicolored train with the first car painted yellow, the second car painted red, the third car painted orange, and the fourth car painted purple.
