= Cedar Point Light (Ohio) =

Lighthouse in Ohio, US

- U.S. National Register of Historic Places
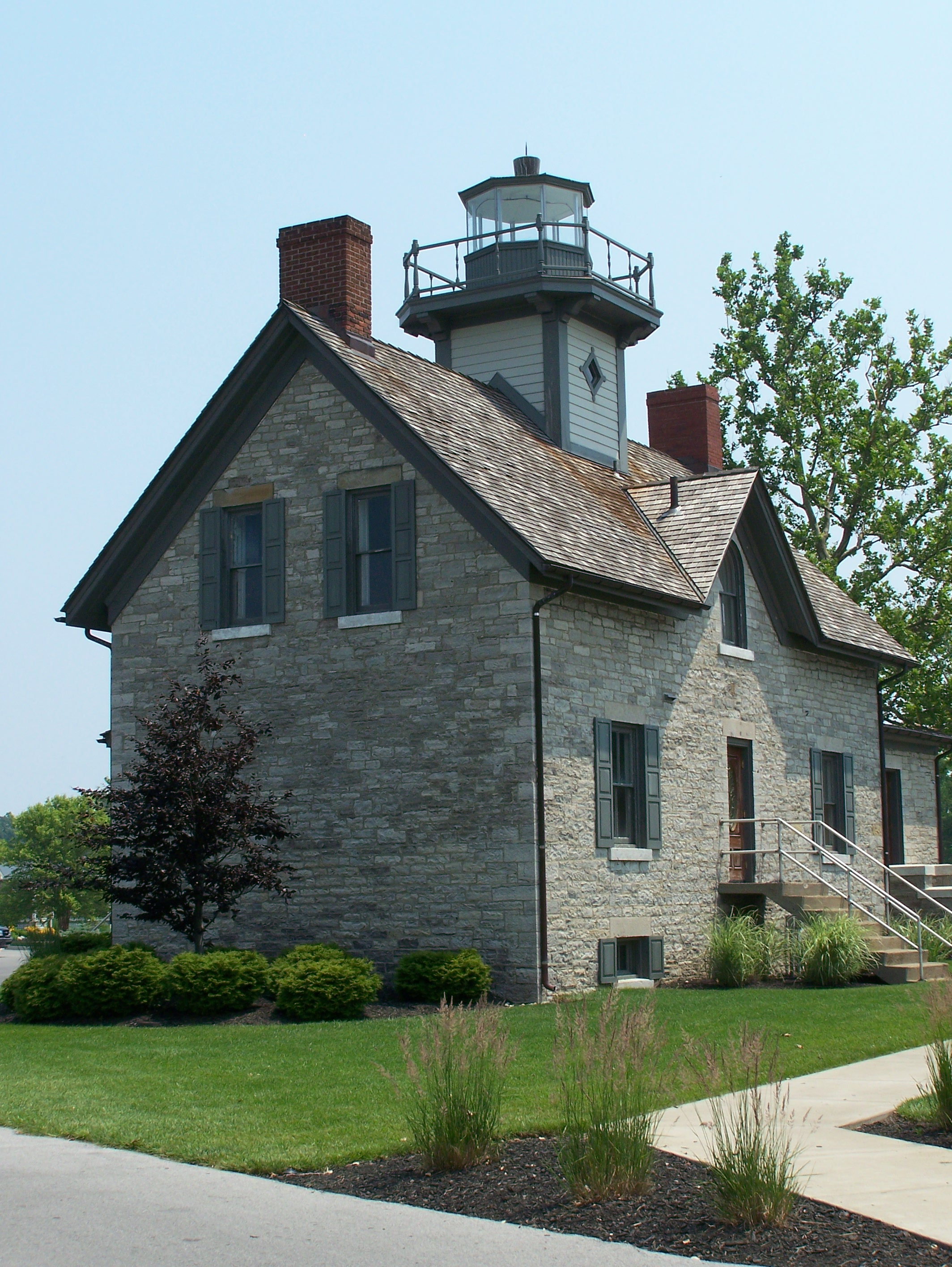
- Exterior of the lighthouse

- Location within Ohio Location within the United States
- Location: Cedar Point, Sandusky, Ohio
- Coordinates: 41.488220°N 82.693441°W
- Area: 1 acre (0.40 ha)
- Built: 1862
- MPS: U.S. Coast Guard Lighthouses and Light Stations on the Great Lakes TR
- NRHP reference No.: 84003667
- Added to NRHP: July 19, 1984

The Cedar Point Light is a restored lighthouse on the grounds of the Cedar Point in Sandusky, Ohio, United States. The original lighthouse at the site was built in 1838, and a front range light was added to the station in 1853. A new lighthouse, the structure which stands today, was completed in 1862. This light served as a navigational aid until 1909, in which year the light tower was removed from atop the dwelling. In the ensuing years it was kept in use by the federal government as a buoy depot, a radio beacon station and a search and rescue boat station. These last duties were transferred to Marblehead Coast Guard Station in 1975, and the Cedar Point station was discontinued. Cedar Point Amusement Park acquired the structure in 1987 and spent the decade refurbishing the dwelling and reconstructing the light tower. The lighthouse opened as part of a vacation cottage development in 2001.

The Cedar Point Light was added to the National Register of Historic Places in 1984.
