= Woodstock Express (Cedar Point) =

Steel roller coaster

- Woodstock Express in July 2005

Cedar Point
- Location: Cedar Point
- Park section: Camp Snoopy
- Coordinates: 41°29′7″N 82°41′20.50″W
- Status: Operating
- Opening date: May 10, 1999

General statistics
- Type: Steel – Junior
- Manufacturer: Vekoma
- Model: Junior Coaster (335m)
- Height: 38 ft (12 m)
- Length: 1,099 ft (335 m)
- Speed: 25 mph (40 km/h)
- Duration: 1:10
- Height restriction: 36 in (91 cm)
- Trains: Single train with 8 cars; riders arranged 2 across in a single row for a total of 16 riders per train
- Woodstock Express at RCDB

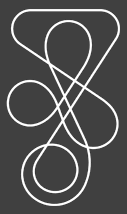
Track layout

Woodstock Express is a steel junior roller coaster located in Cedar Point in Sandusky, Ohio. It was built in 1999 by Vekoma.

Woodstock Express has a 540-degree downward helix and a 270-degree downward helix. Its height is listed as 38 feet and top speed at 25mph.

Riders must be taller than 36 inches (910 mm) to ride with an adult and 48 inches (1,200 mm) tall to ride alone.
