= Cedar Point =

Amusement park in Sandusky, Ohio, US

- Logo used since 2017

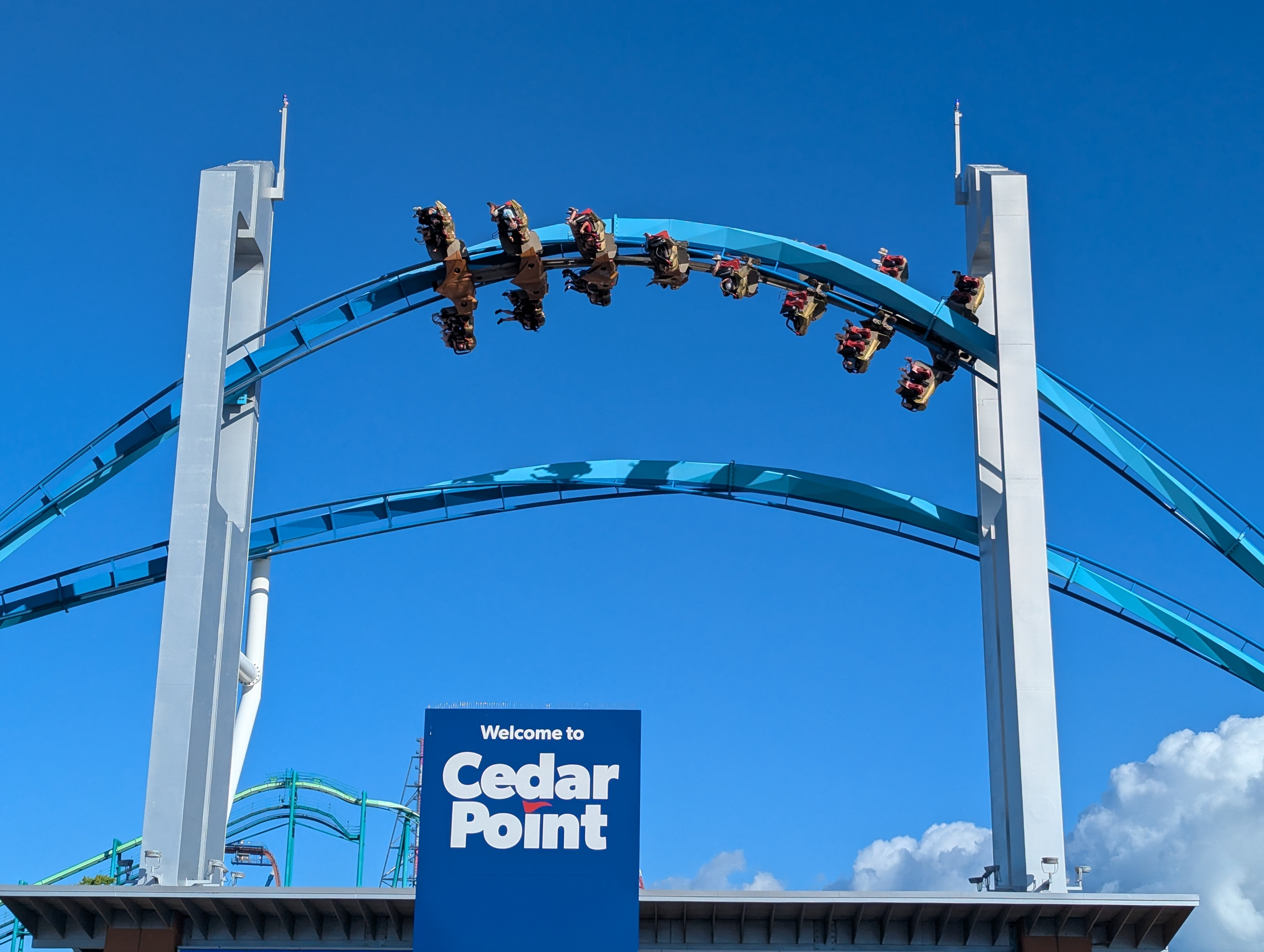
- GateKeeper, the entrance plaza roller coaster of Cedar Point
- Interactive map of Cedar Point
- Location: Sandusky, Ohio, U.S.
- Coordinates: 41°28′48″N 82°40′57″W
- Status: Operating
- Opened: 1870; 156 years ago
- Owner: Six Flags
- Park president: Colleen Brady
- Slogan: "A Place Like No Other"; "America's Roller Coast"
- Operating season: May through October
- Attendance: ▲3.78 million in 2024
- Area: 364 acres (0.569 mi^{2}; 1.47 km^{2})

Attractions
- Total: 70
- Roller coasters: 18
- Water rides: 1
- Website: sixflags.com/cedarpoint

Cedar Point is a 364-acre (147 ha) amusement park located on a Lake Erie peninsula in Sandusky, Ohio, United States. Owned and operated by Six Flags, Cedar Point opened in 1870 and is considered the second-oldest operating amusement park in the country behind Lake Compounce. It served as the "flagship park" of the Cedar Fair amusement park chain prior to the merger with Six Flags in 2024. Known as "America's Roller Coast", the park features 18 roller coasters, which ties for first among amusement parks in North America alongside sister parks Six Flags Magic Mountain and Canada's Wonderland.

Cedar Point's normal operating season runs from early May until Labor Day in September, which is followed by weekend-only operation through Halloween during an annual event known as HalloWeekends. Other amenities and attractions featured within the park include a one-mile-long (1.6 km) beach, an outdoor water park named Cedar Point Shores, an indoor water park named Castaway Bay, two marinas, and an outdoor sports complex called Cedar Point Sports Center.

The park has reached numerous milestones over the years, including one in which Cedar Point became the only amusement park in the world with five roller coasters that exceed 200 feet (61 m) in height – Magnum XL-200, Millennium Force, Valravn, Steel Vengeance, and Top Thrill 2 – as well as the only park with roller coasters in all four height classifications. Cedar Point also received the Golden Ticket Award for "Best Amusement Park in the World" from Amusement Today for sixteen consecutive years from 1997 to 2013. Among seasonal amusement parks in North America, Cedar Point consistently ranks as the second-most visited behind only Canada's Wonderland, with an estimated 3.44 million visitors in 2022. Several of its buildings are also listed on the National Register of Historic Places.

== History ==
In the late-19th century, the south shore region of Lake Erie became a popular vacation destination for the emerging middle-class in the United States. The Lake's islands, such as Kelleys Island and South Bass Island, were gaining a reputation for their freshwater bathing resorts. The Cedar Point peninsula, named for its abundance of cedar trees, was originally known for its fishing. Local fishermen leased land and built living quarters there. Sandusky, which featured an important shipping harbor and two railroads, transformed into a major economic center over the next three decades. Railroad and steamship travel supported an emerging tourism industry, and rapid development of the area began.

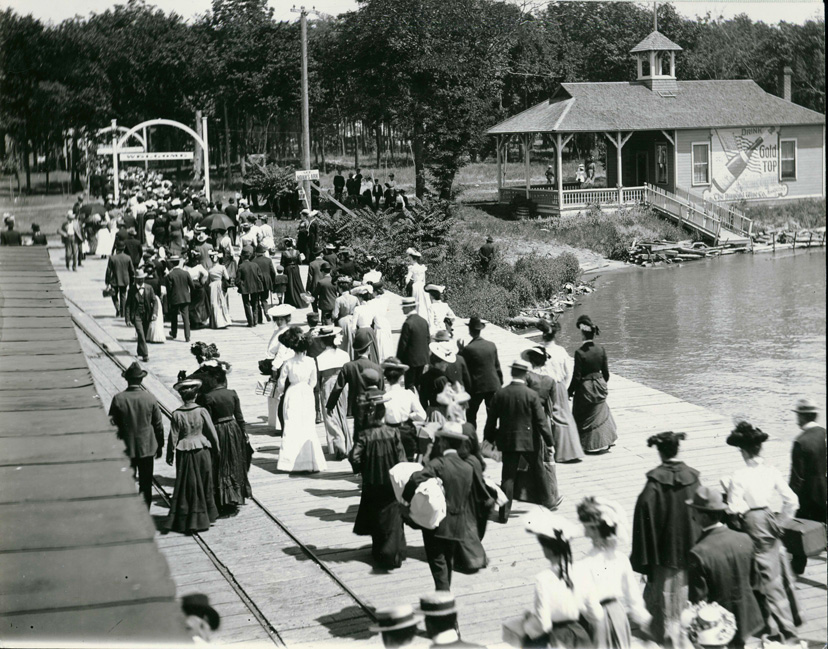
Cedar Point in the 1890s

In the 1860s during the American Civil War, housing for a battery of four field artillery pieces was constructed at the tip of the peninsula. It was used to defend a prison for Confederate soldiers on nearby Johnson's Island. Louis Zistel, a German immigrant, built two boats to transport the prisoners. In 1870, he began to ferry locals to the Cedar Point peninsula, which opened as a public bathing beach. Zistel opened a bathhouse on the north shore of the peninsula and the same year built a beer garden with a small dance floor. He charged 25 cents per person to ride from Sandusky to Cedar Point on his boat, Young Reindeer, widely recognized as the beginning of commercial tourism on the Cedar Point peninsula.

In 1878, James West opened a group of bathhouses near the beach. By 1880, a local newspaper had observed that the popularity of the beach was increasing, with picnicking on the grounds becoming a popular pastime. The popularity of the peninsula attracted the attention of Benjamin F. Dwelle and Captain William Slackford, who leased land on the peninsula in 1882 and built eight new bathhouses, a dance hall, and wooden walkways on the beach. The steamboats R.B. Hayes and Lutts provided transport to Biemiller's Cove and Cedar Point Light. Building on early success, Dwelle and Slackford continued to expand the offerings for their visitors each year and added picnic tables, cleared acres of brush, and built a baseball diamond.

After Slackford became ill in 1888, Dwelle entered into a more lucrative partnership with Adam Stoll and Louis Adolph, who owned land at Cedar Point, along with investors Charles Baetz and Jacob Kuebeler. The partnership's first venture was constructing a Grand Pavilion, which opened the same year in 1888 and marked the first concerted effort to operate the peninsula as a public resort. It was a two-story theater and concert hall with a bowling alley and photographer's studio. The building was recognized for its unusual architecture and still stands in the park. The first amusement ride at Cedar Point, a water toboggan ride consisting of a ramp that launched riders into Lake Erie, opened in 1890. Electricity was installed at Cedar Point in 1891. The first roller coaster, Switchback Railway, opened the following year. It stood 25 feet (7.6 m) high and had a top speed of 10 miles per hour (16 km/h). The Switchback Railway was designed as two identical tracks side-by-side – one for the ride down and the other for the train to be hauled back to the top by the ride attendant.

=== Boeckling era ===
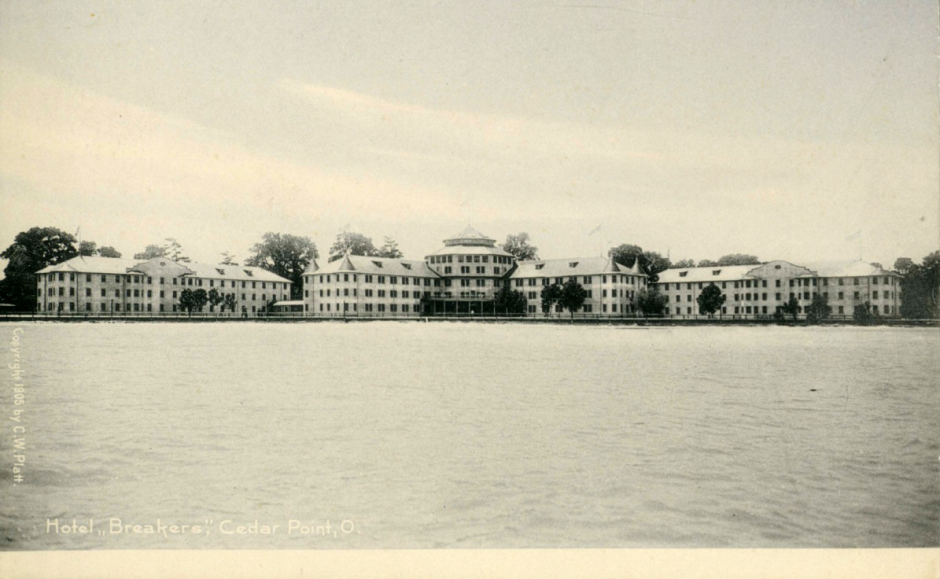
Lake view of Hotel Breakers (1905)

Representatives of the Lake Erie and Western Railroad purchased the peninsula for US$256,000 (equivalent to about $9,907,200 in 2025) in 1897 and formed the Cedar Point Pleasure Resort Company. The company appointed George A. Boeckling, a businessman from Indiana, as the park's new manager. Under his tenure, the peninsula was transformed from a picnic ground into a nationally recognized amusement park and resort destination.

The second roller coaster at Cedar Point, the Figure-Eight Roller Toboggan, debuted in 1902. It was moved several years later and renamed The Racer. A pony track was built near the beach the same year. Mosquitos were an issue, so in 1904, the park hired the Detroit Dredging Company to drain swampy areas on the peninsula, thereby connecting a series of lagoons to form a water passageway that quickly became one of the park's signature attractions. Aside from sightseeing passenger boats, the passageway was used to transport coal to power plants near the center of the peninsula. The historic Hotel Breakers opened in 1905 as one of the largest hotels in the Midwest; it had 600 guest rooms and a cafe that could seat 400 guests. A new area of the park called "Amusement Circle" was designed in 1906 to link the pier to the beach. It was located southeast of the Coliseum, a large arena built the same year that featured a grand ballroom and other attractions.

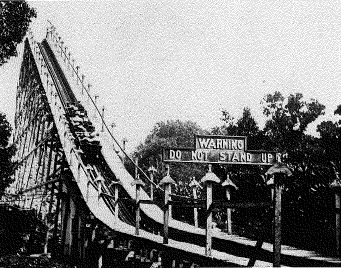
Leap the Dips, circa 1920s

The Dip the Dips Scenic Railway roller coaster opened in 1908, but it was soon overshadowed by the larger Leap the Dips ride that opened in 1912. In 1917, Dip the Dips was razed and replaced by the Leap Frog Scenic Railway. With a growing assortment of rides including three roller coasters, Cedar Point was beginning to grow as an amusement park. However, that wasn't a priority for Boeckling. He marketed the peninsula primarily as a bathing resort complete with shows, exhibits, motion pictures, and other forms of entertainment, but did not place emphasis on the park's rides.

Several additional hotels and restaurants were constructed in the remaining years of Boeckling's tenure, including Hotel Cedars, White House Hotel, Crystal Rock Castle and Crystal Gardens Ballroom. Cedar Point continued to update its ride attractions, replacing the Racer, the Circle Swing, and other rides to make way for a Shoot-the-Chutes water ride, a Tilt-A-Whirl, and fun houses such as Noah's Ark and Bluebeard's Palace. The Cyclone, a wooden roller coaster, opened in 1929. Boeckling, who was still attempting to expand the park, died from uremia on July 24, 1931.

=== After Boeckling: the George A. Roose era ===
Edward Smith took over Cedar Point's management after Boeckling's death. As a result of the Great Depression, little expansion happened through the 1930s. One of the few rides built in during this time was the Tumble Bug. The decaying Leap the Dips coaster was demolished in the mid-1930s. In the late 1930s, the resort was on the brink of being sold to the state of Ohio for US$3,000,000 (equivalent to about $67,187,500 in 2025). After the 1938 season, the directors had the second floor of the Coliseum modernized in the art deco style with a new stage. In the middle, the giant dance floor remained. Some of the top bands of the time played in the ballroom. As a result, it kept Cedar Point operating through the rest of the Depression. Momma Berardi's Home Made French Fries came to Cedar Point; Momma Berardi's family played an important role in the food industry at Cedar Point. Momma Berardi's fries were sold there from 1942 until 1978, winning four Reader's Choice Awards.

By the end of World War II, Cedar Point needed financial help. The wood of the Cyclone roller coaster was rotting, the boardwalk was cracked in many places, and the fishing dock was in need of repair. In 1946, Cedar Point's oldest still-existing ride, the Midway Carousel, was installed. By 1951, the Cyclone coaster was razed because of its poor condition, leaving the resort without a roller coaster. As the Cyclone was being removed, the Laff-in-the-Dark, Rocket Ships, and Loop-A-Plane attractions were installed. Cedar Point Causeway was built in 1957 and is still in use. The president of Cedar Point, Bernie Zeiher, was replaced by George Roose around 1958, and Emile Legros was elected chairman that same year.

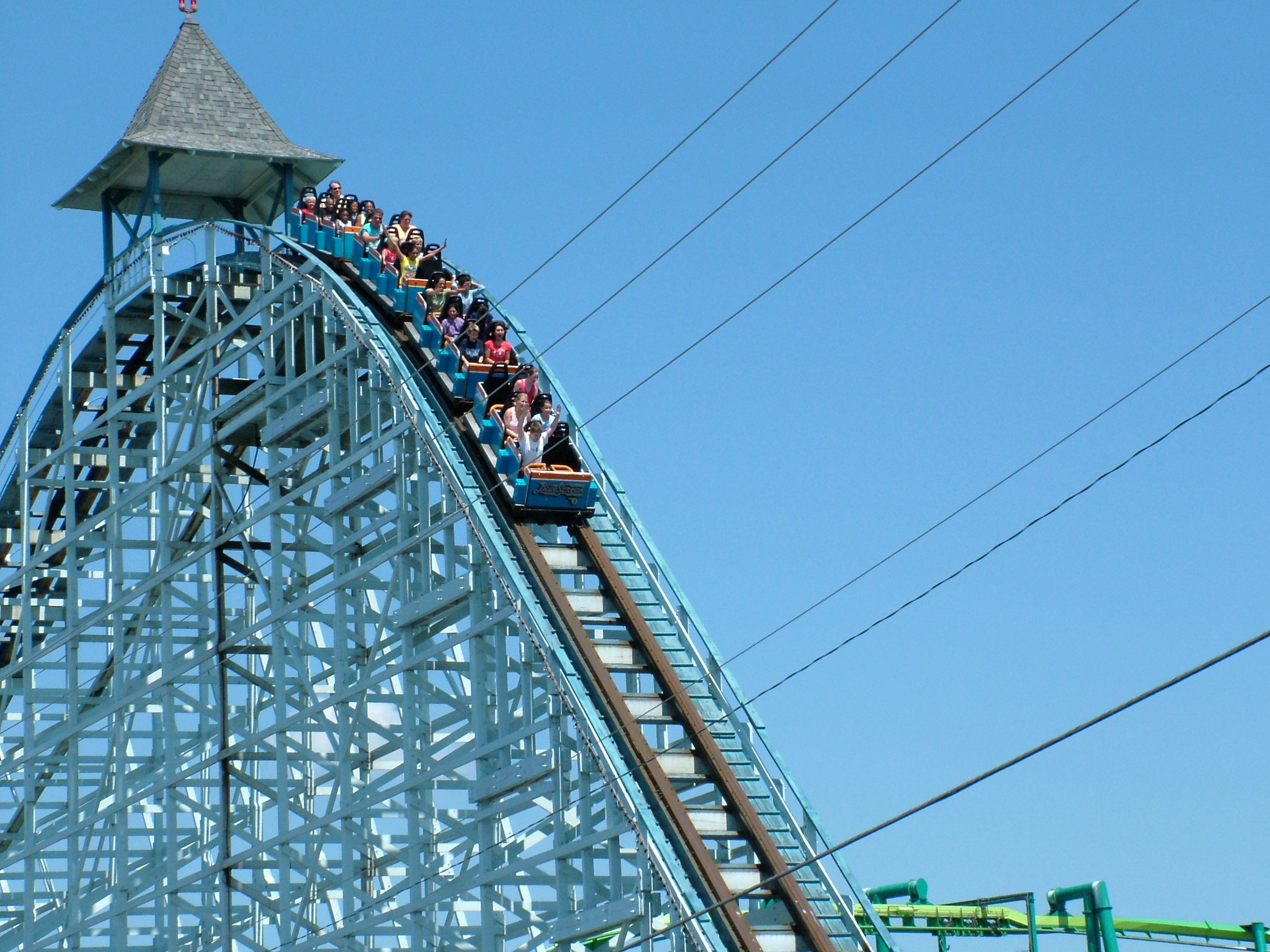
Blue Streak, built in 1964, is Cedar Point's oldest operating roller coaster.

In the 1950s, the Pagoda Gift Shop was a post office and the Crystal Rock Castle was turned into a maintenance shop in the late-1950s. In 1959, the hotels were repainted, new admission gates were installed, and over US$1,200,000 (equivalent to about $13,253,400 in 2025) was spent to refresh Cedar Point. The park's first roller coaster since the Cyclone, the Wild Mouse, was built. The resort also got a new kind of ride, a monorail, that was the most popular ride in 1959. Breakers Hotel was restored and the neglected cottages were demolished. The Coliseum and Grand Pavilion were both painted and remodeled. The Crystal Rock Castle Maintenance Shop, bathhouses, and the old powerhouse were demolished, and a new $50,000 bathhouse, boiler house, and maintenance shop were built in their place.

In the 1960s, the idea of "pay one price" season passes became common. On March 28, 1960, Cedar Point announced plans to transform the park into a "Disneyland" amusement center. Those plans fell through, however. Cedar Point & Lake Erie Railroad opened in 1963, transporting passengers from the middle of the park to the back. In 1964, Cedar Point built its oldest surviving roller coaster, the Blue Streak. It was named after the local high school's sports teams, the Sandusky Blue Streaks. Jungle Larry's Safari Island was a well-known attraction that operated from 1965 until 1994 despite the death of Jungle Larry in 1984. The Cedar Creek Mine Ride opened in 1969; it is currently the second oldest roller coaster at Cedar Point.

In 1970, the Centennial Theatre, named in honor of Cedar Point's 100th anniversary, was built. 1972 brought Giant Wheel and the now-defunct Jumbo Jet coaster. During the summer of 1974, Cedar Point reached an agreement with Marriott Corporation to be acquired in a stock trade, where Roose and Legros would receive Marriott stock in exchange for Cedar Point stock. At the time, Marriott was expanding into the theme park business with locations in Illinois and California. The agreement was short-lived as the deal was called off by Labor Day of that year. Around the same time, Cedar Point acquired property in the Irish Hills of Michigan in an attempt to build a second amusement park. The project was eventually cancelled due to local opposition. In 1975, Robert L. Munger Jr. took over as president of Cedar Point after Roose retired. The record-breaking Corkscrew roller coaster was built in 1976; it was the first roller coaster to span a midway and have three inversions. Gemini opened in 1978 and was advertised as the tallest, fastest and steepest roller coaster in the world. A kiddie coaster, named Jr. Gemini (now known as Wilderness Run), opened the following year across from the Gemini. White Water Landing opened in 1982, replacing the original Shoot the Rapids log flume. In 1983, Demon Drop was built at the front of the park. Avalanche Run opened in 1985 close to the beach and would later be re-themed as Disaster Transport. That same year, the San Francisco Earthquake Ride was transformed into the Berenstain Bear Country.

While Cedar Point operated independently up until this point, Munger saw the opportunity to expand by acquiring Valleyfair amusement park in Minnesota in 1978. Parent company Cedar Fair Limited Partnership, commonly known as Cedar Fair, was later formed in 1983. Its name was derived from both parks – "Cedar" representing Cedar Point and "Fair" representing Valleyfair. The company went public on April 29, 1987.

=== Dick Kinzel era ===
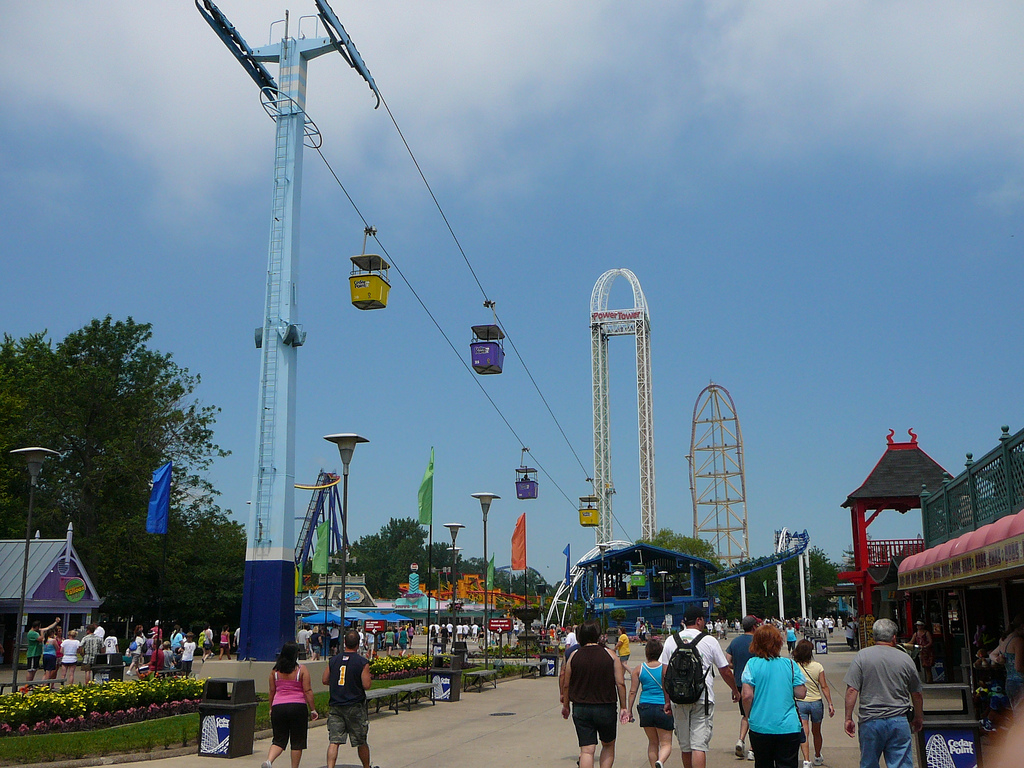
View of the Sky Ride from the main midway (2009)

Robert L. Munger Jr, who also served as president and chief executive officer (CEO) of Cedar Fair, stepped down in 1986 due to health issues and was replaced by Richard "Dick" Kinzel. Thunder Canyon, a river rafting ride manufactured by Intamin, also opened in 1986. In 1987, Iron Dragon, a suspended roller coaster, debuted on the Million Dollar Midway near the Cedar Point & Lake Erie Railroad station. In 1988, Soak City (now known as Cedar Point Shores), Cedar Point's outdoor water park, was constructed near Hotel Breakers. It featured speed slides, more than 10 body and tube slides, a family raft ride, a water playhouse, and two lazy rivers.

Cedar Point added several record-breaking rides from 1989 to 2011 under Kinzel's management. Magnum XL-200 debuted in 1989 as the tallest and fastest roller coaster in the world. It was the first coaster to exceed the 200-foot (61 m) barrier, which led to the coining of the industry term hypercoaster. It was also the first to reach speeds greater than 70 mph (110 km/h). Magnum is often credited as shifting the focus of Cedar Point, as noted by then-park Vice President, John Hildebrandt: "We all were smart enough to know we had something. Big steel made a big difference and with Magnum we started branding ourselves as a big time roller coaster park". To keep the momentum going, Mean Streak opened in 1991 as the northernmost attraction in the park. It broke records for the tallest and fastest wooden roller coaster in the world, reaching a maximum speed of 65 mph (105 km/h) and a height of 161 feet (49 m).

Between major releases, the park continued to service and transform other rides, as well as build additional rides, areas, and amenities. For the 1990 season, Avalanche Run was transformed into Disaster Transport, adding special effects and fully enclosing the ride. Challenge Park was built between Hotel Breakers and Soak City in 1992. Challenge Park included RipCord, Skyscraper, and two eighteen-hole mini-golf courses. Snake River Falls was constructed in 1993 as a result of Soak City's popularity. The 82-foot-tall (25 m) structure sent riders plunging down a 50-degree angle at 40 mph (64 km/h). At the bottom of the hill, the ride ended with a splash landing that created a large wave, which splashed spectators on an overlooking bridge. It opened as the tallest and fastest water ride in the world.

Former logo (1979–1994)

Former logo (1995–2016)

In 1994, Cedar Point unveiled Raptor, which opened as the tallest, fastest, and longest inverted roller coaster in the world, and the first ever to feature the signature cobra roll element. To accommodate the footprint of the new coaster, the Mill Race log flume was removed, and the circular Calypso was relocated. In December 1994, the park held its only Christmas in the Park. The Midway Carousel was open, a horse-drawn carriage gave behind-the-scenes tours of the park and the midway held many Christmas festivals, including a Christmas tree.

In 1996, Cedar Point opened Mantis, then the tallest, steepest, and fastest stand-up roller coaster in the world. Originally, the ride was to be called "Banshee", but it was later changed after negative public reaction. The discarded name would later be reused for Banshee at Kings Island in 2014. In 1997, the park introduced HalloWeekends, a Halloween-themed event with haunted houses and mazes, which typically operates from September through late October. Camp Snoopy debuted in 1999 featuring eight Snoopy-themed attractions, with the exception of a Tilt-A-Whirl. The area also features a junior roller coaster built by Vekoma, Woodstock Express.

Cedar Point built the first giga coaster, Millennium Force, in 2000. When it debuted, it was the tallest and fastest complete-circuit roller coaster in the world, climbing 310 ft (94 m) and reaching a maximum speed of 93 mph (150 km/h). In 2002, Wicked Twister opened as the tallest, fastest, and longest inverted impulse roller coaster of its kind. In the midst of a highly-competitive industry with other parks, Cedar Point again set new records the following year with the debut of Top Thrill Dragster, which opened as the tallest and fastest roller coaster in the world in 2003. It reached a height of 420 ft (130 m) and a maximum speed of 120 mph (190 km/h). Kingda Ka at Six Flags Great Adventure broke both records two years later.

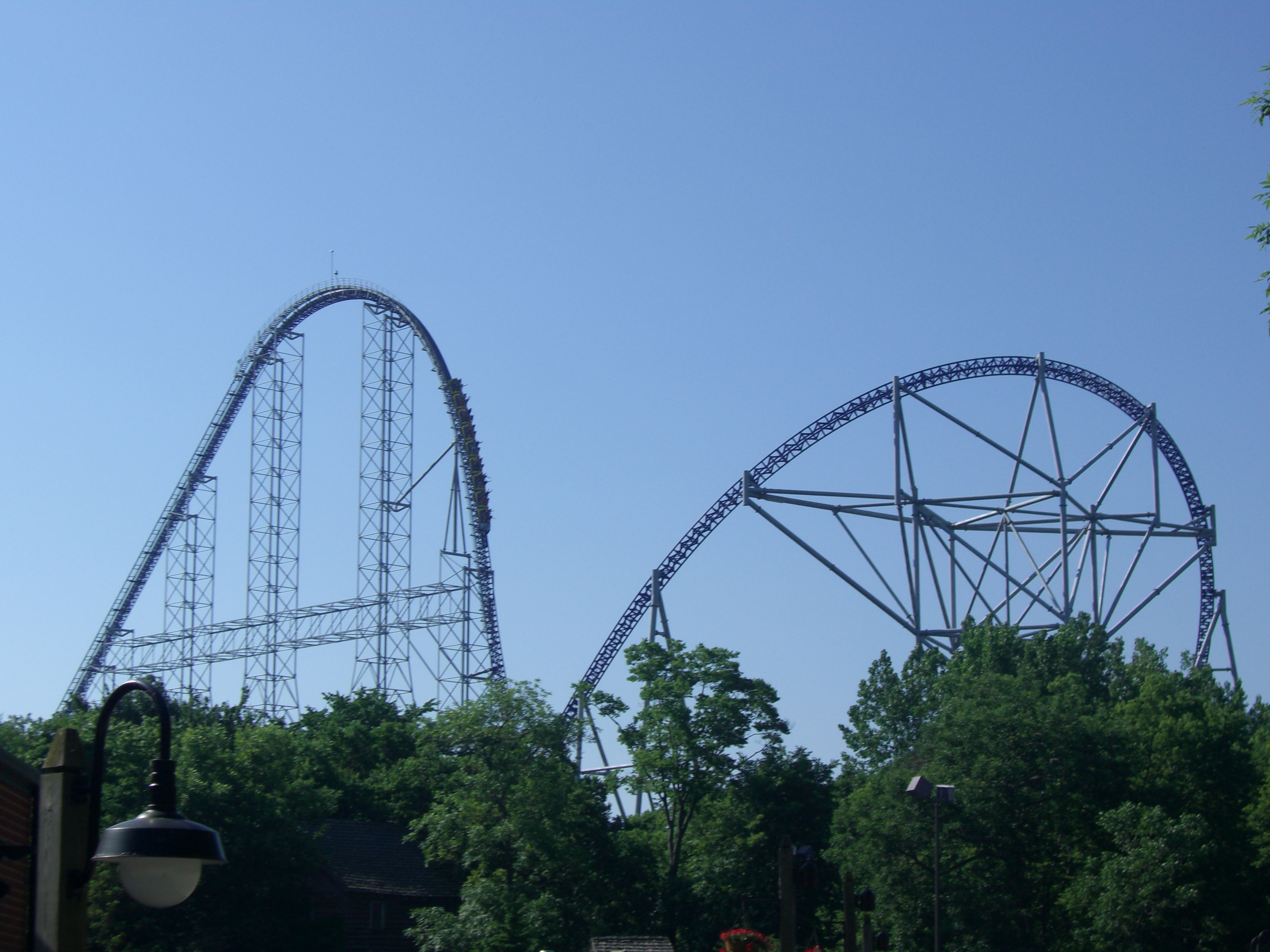
Millennium Force, added in 2000, is Cedar Point's signature roller coaster.

maXair debuted in 2005 as only the second HUSS Giant Frisbee ride in the United States. Dan Keller also retired in 2005 as vice president and general manager. He was replaced by John Hildebrandt, who had been vice president and general manager of Dorney Park & Wildwater Kingdom since May 2004.

In 2006, Skyhawk was built next to Snake River Falls; it is currently the tallest Screamin' Swing in the world. In the 2007 season, Cedar Point built Maverick, which features a 100-foot (30 m) drop at a 95-degree angle and includes a linear synchronous motor (LSM) launch in the middle of the ride reaching speeds of 70 miles per hour (110 km/h). In 2008, Cedar Point introduced Planet Snoopy, a kids' area constructed on the site of Peanuts Playground; it consists of family and children's rides relocated from Cedar Point's sister park Geauga Lake after it closed. The area also consisted of a "Kids Only" restaurant called Joe Cool Cafe, which had a small menu for adults.

In 2009, Starlight Experience debuted, a night-time LED light extravaganza with floats themed to the four seasons. The $1,000,000 attraction took place on the Frontier Trail nightly beginning at twilight. In 2010, Cedar Point added a new flume ride on the park's Frontier Trail named Shoot the Rapids, which included two drops and a three-minute journey through a rustic, western-themed environment. It was removed in February 2016 following a history of low ridership and a serious incident in 2013 injuring seven riders. WindSeeker, a 301-foot (92 m) tall tower that spins riders along the shoreline of Lake Erie, was introduced in 2011. WindSeeker did not open on time due to construction delays and opened to the public on June 14, 2011.

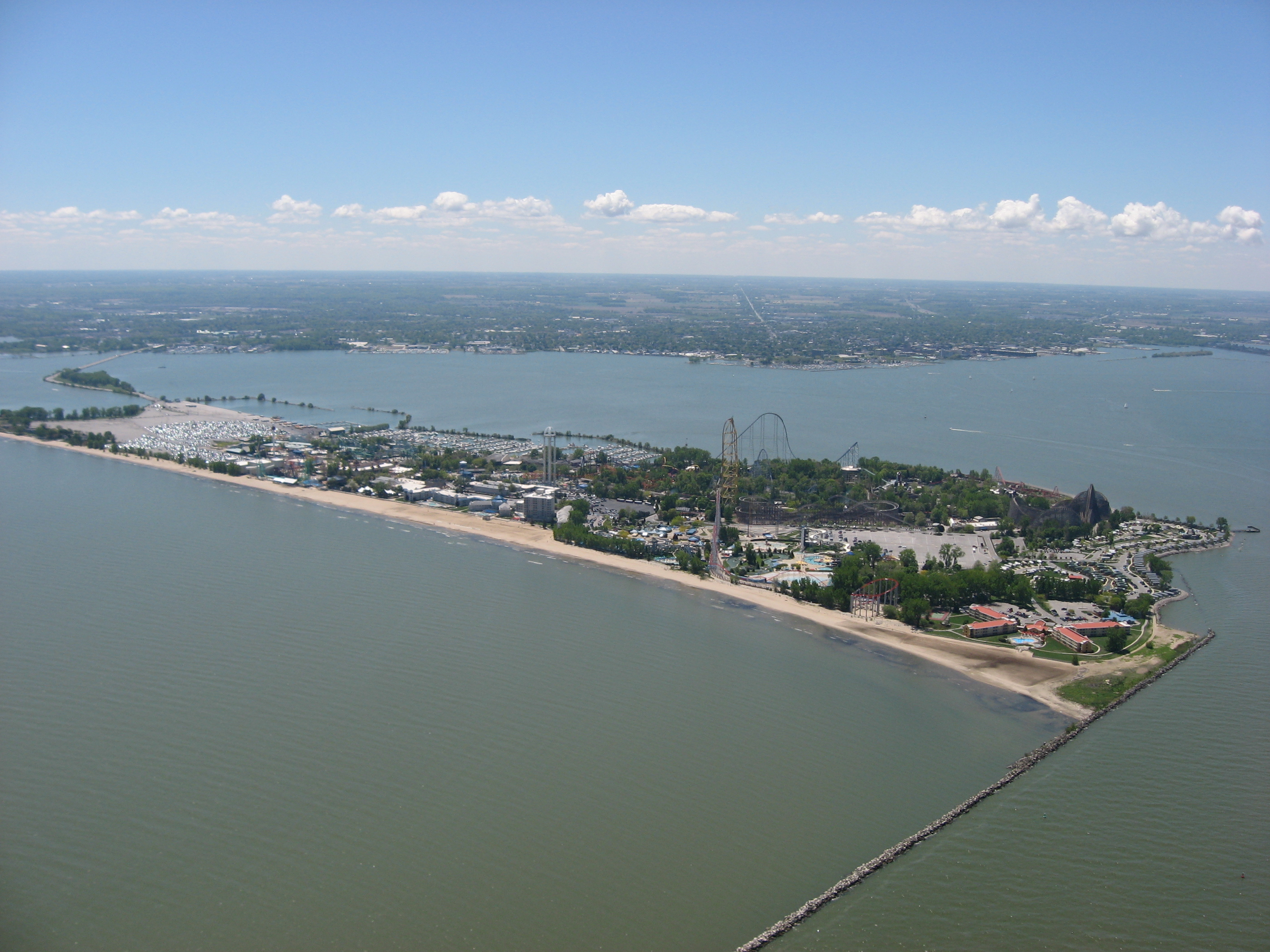
Aerial view of Cedar Point in 2008

=== Modern era ===
On June 20, 2011, Cedar Fair announced that Dick Kinzel would retire on January 3, 2012, and Matt Ouimet would become the CEO of the company. Ouimet was employed by The Walt Disney Company for 17 years, including tenures as president of Disney Cruise Line and the Disneyland Resort.

In 2012, Cedar Point added Dinosaurs Alive!, a walk-through exhibit featuring approximately 50 life-size animatronic dinosaurs. It was located on Adventure Island and replaced the Paddlewheel Excursions boat cruise ride. Dinosaurs Alive! was replaced with Forbidden Frontier after the 2018 season. A six-lane mat racer slide complex called Dragster H_{2}O was added to Soak City. The slides around Dragster H_{2}O were repainted and the Speed Slides were dismantled to make room for Dragster H_{2}O. Cedar Point also introduced Fast Lane, their version of a fast-pass system, and a new nighttime show, Luminosity – Ignite the Night!. Cedar Point also removed WildCat for the 2012 season to make room for Luminosity. This was the first time since 1978 that a roller coaster was removed from Cedar Point.

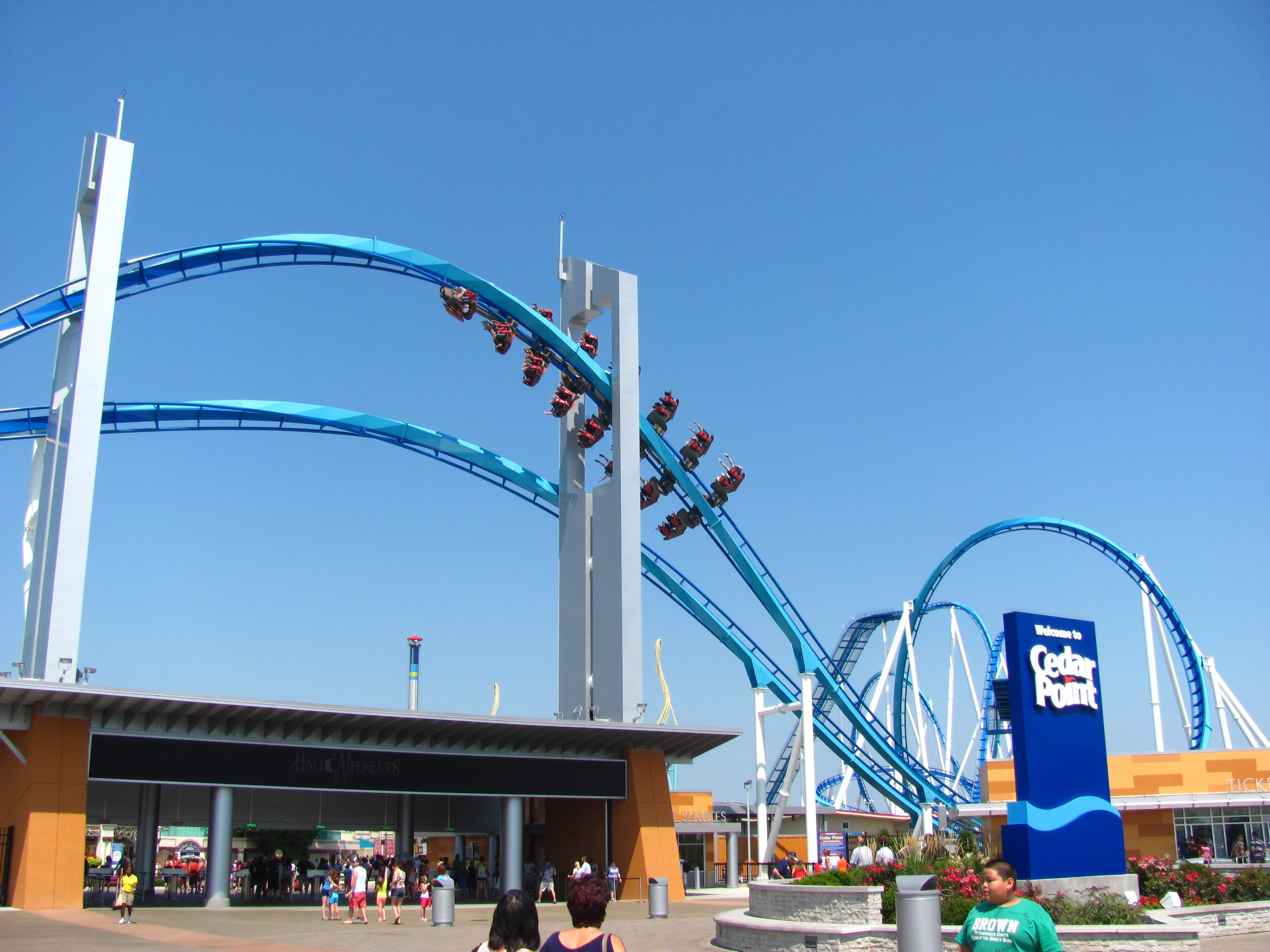
Cedar Point's renovated entrance for 2013, featuring GateKeeper

On July 13, 2012, Cedar Point announced the removal of Disaster Transport and Space Spiral. Exactly a month later, Cedar Point announced GateKeeper, the longest wing coaster in the world, which opened on May 11, 2013. Along with GateKeeper, a new main entrance plaza was constructed, replacing the entrance that was built in the 1960s. It features two 100-foot (30 m)-tall support columns that the GateKeeper trains go through. Cedar Point invested $60 million in its resort hotels over the next three years, starting in the 2013–2014 offseason. At the end of the 2013 season, John Hildebrandt retired as the park's general manager and was replaced by Jason McClure, the former vice president and general manager of Dorney Park & Wildwater Kingdom.

Two new family attractions called Pipe Scream and Lake Erie Eagles were added in 2014, along with a pay-per-ride thrill ride named SlingShot. Camp Snoopy and the Gemini Midway underwent renovations the same year, and some rides within those areas were relocated and given new themes. In 2015, the stand-up coaster Mantis was transformed into a floorless roller coaster called Rougarou, receiving new trains and a new green and orange paint scheme in the process. Also in 2015, Hotel Breakers received a $25-million renovation. A new roller coaster called Valravn debuted in 2016 as the tallest, fastest, and longest dive coaster in the world. The 223-foot-tall (68 m) ride replaced the 40-year-old Good Time Theater along with an antique car ride known as Turnpike Cars. Calypso was also moved in the process to the beach area near GateKeeper, where it was renamed Tiki Twirl. Raptor and Top Thrill Dragster were repainted as well.

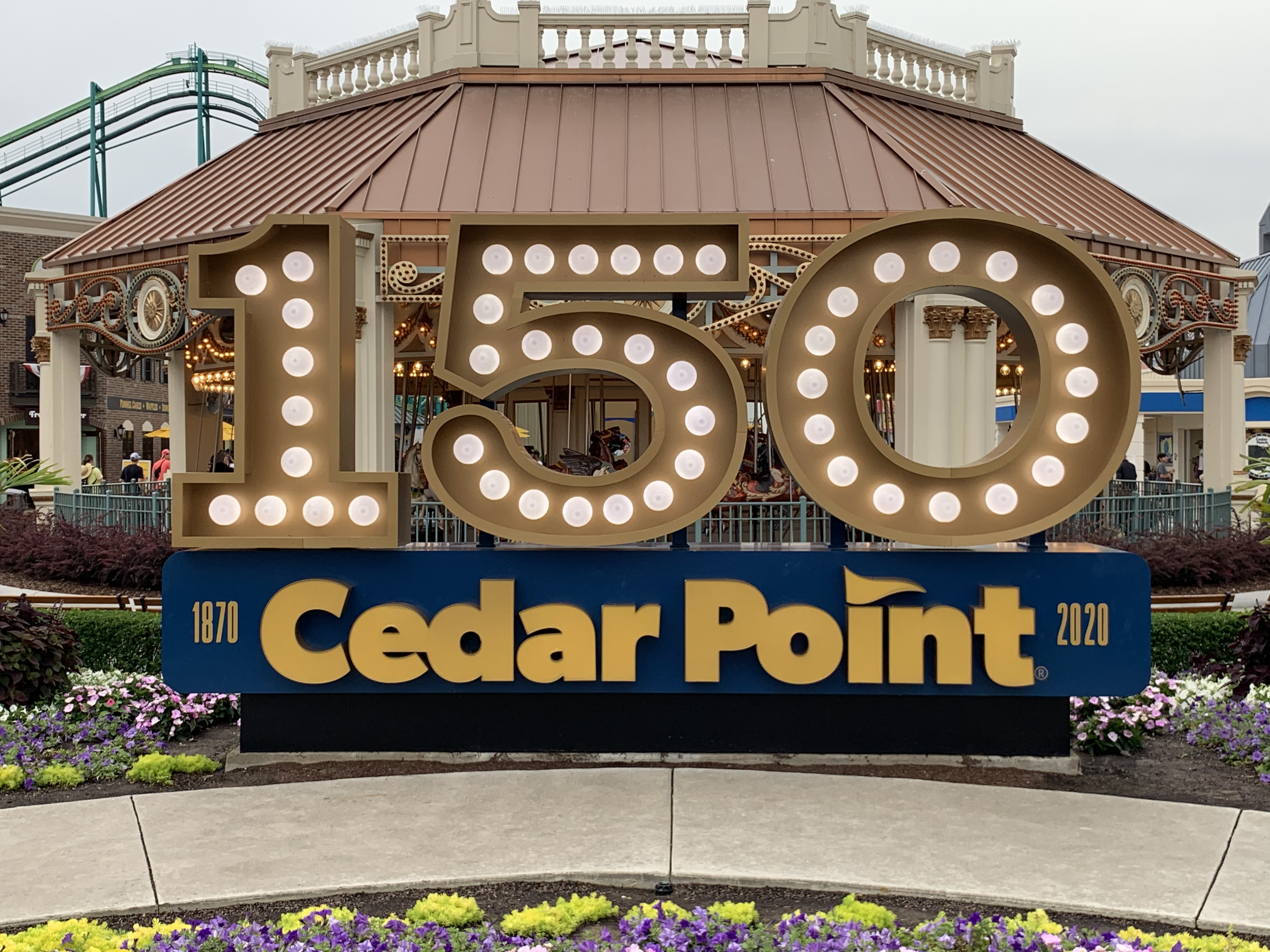
150th anniversary sign (2022)

As the 2016 season came to a close, Cedar Point announced that Mean Streak would close permanently on September 16, 2016, although park officials declined to confirm that it was being torn down. The park teased subtle hints over the following year that the roller coaster was, in fact, being refurbished. In August 2017, Cedar Point officially confirmed that Mean Streak would reemerge as Steel Vengeance in 2018.

The park was set to celebrate its "150th Anniversary Season" in 2020, introducing a new family boat ride attraction called Snake River Expedition. However, both the celebration and the new ride's debut were postponed until 2021 as a result of the COVID-19 pandemic.

In April 2021, Carrie Boldman became vice president and the first female general manager in Cedar Point history, after Jason McClure was promoted to a corporate position at Cedar Fair. HalloWeekends returned in 2021 with an expanded operating calendar, which included Halloween Haunt and Tricks and Treats Fall Fest. Wicked Twister closed permanently on September 6, 2021, to make room for future development. An incident at Top Thrill Dragster in August 2021, which resulted in a serious injury to a guest waiting in line, prompted an investigation by the Ohio Department of Agriculture. The park closed the ride the following two seasons and announced in 2023 that it would be modified by Zamperla to feature a second 420-foot (130 m) tower and two additional launches. In 2024, it briefly reopened as Top Thrill 2, before being closed after a few days of operation for the remainder of the season for extensive repairs. On July 1, 2024, Cedar Fair merged with Six Flags, and the combined Six Flags Entertainment Corporation took over Cedar Point. On September 19, 2024, Cedar Point announced Siren's Curse, the tallest, fastest and longest tilt coaster in North America, to open in 2025. At the end of the 2024 season, it was announced that Boldman would be stepping down from her role as vice president and general manager.

=== Park timeline ===
Before 1960

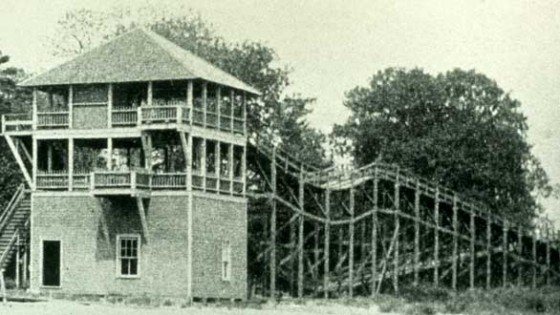
Switchback Railway, first roller coaster at Cedar Point

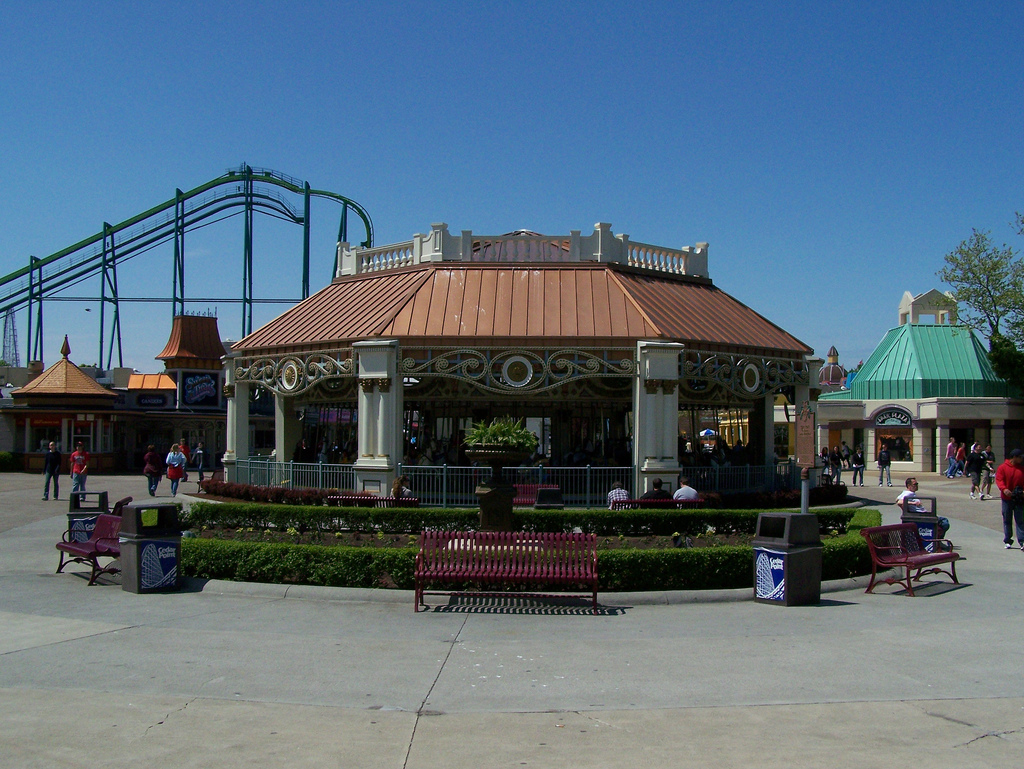
Midway Carousel, added in 1946

- 1870: New bathing resort and beer garden opens to the public on Cedar Point peninsula.
- 1882: Improvements near Biemiller's Cove including new walkways and picnic areas. Eight more bathhouses and the resort's first dancehall are built. New dock with additional steamboats providing transportation service.
- 1884: Great Western Band first performs at Grove on lakeshore
- 1888: The two-story Grand Pavilion opens, featuring a theater, concert hall, bowling alleys, and dining amenities.
- 1892: Switchback Railway opens as the park's first roller coaster with a height of 25 feet (7.6 m) and a top speed of 10 mph (16 km/h).
- 1894: New beach amenities including a pony track, diving platform, and bicycle boats.
- 1897: Beginning of George A. Boeckling era when he becomes park manager.
- 1899: Bay Short Hotel, Cedar Point's first hotel, opens
- 1901: The White House hotel featuring 55 rooms opens on Sandusky Bay. Bay Shore Hotel begins operating as a boarding house.
- 1902: Figure-Eight Roller Toboggan opens
- 1903: The White House hotel expands to 125 rooms
- 1905: Hotel Breakers opens, a 600-room hotel considered one of the largest in the Midwest
- 1906: A large coliseum opens
- 1907: Switchback Railway closes
- 1908: Dip the Dips Scenic Railway opens
- 1910: Figure-Eight Roller Toboggan moved and rebuilt, reopening as Racer
- 1912: Leap the Dips opens
- 1915: The White House hotel renamed Cedars Hotel following a renovation
- 1917: Dip the Dips Scenic Railway closes
- 1918: Scenic Railway reopens as Leap Frog Railway
- 1925: Noah's Ark opens
- 1928: Racer closes
- 1929: Cedar Point Cyclone roller coaster designed by Harry Traver opens featuring a 72-foot (22 m) lift hill
- 1933: Leap Frog Railway renamed High Frolics
- 1934: Tumble Bug opens
- 1935: Leap the Dips closes
- 1940: High Frolics closes
- 1946: Midway Carrousel opens
- 1951: Cyclone closes
- 1952: Super Coaster opens
- 1955: Fascination opens
- 1957: The Cedar Point Causeway opens
- 1958: Cadillac Cars open
- 1959: Monorail, Turnpike Cars, and Wild Mouse opens; Noah's Ark closes; Construction is completed on the Cedar Point Marina
1960 to 1999

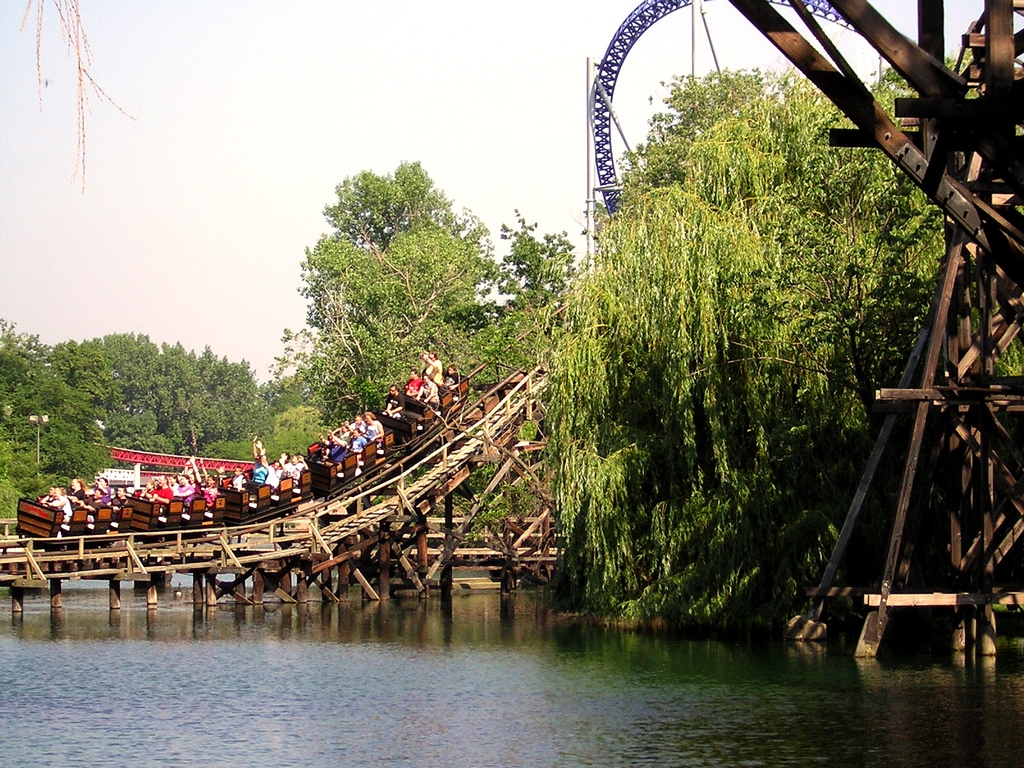
Cedar Creek Mine Ride, added in 1969

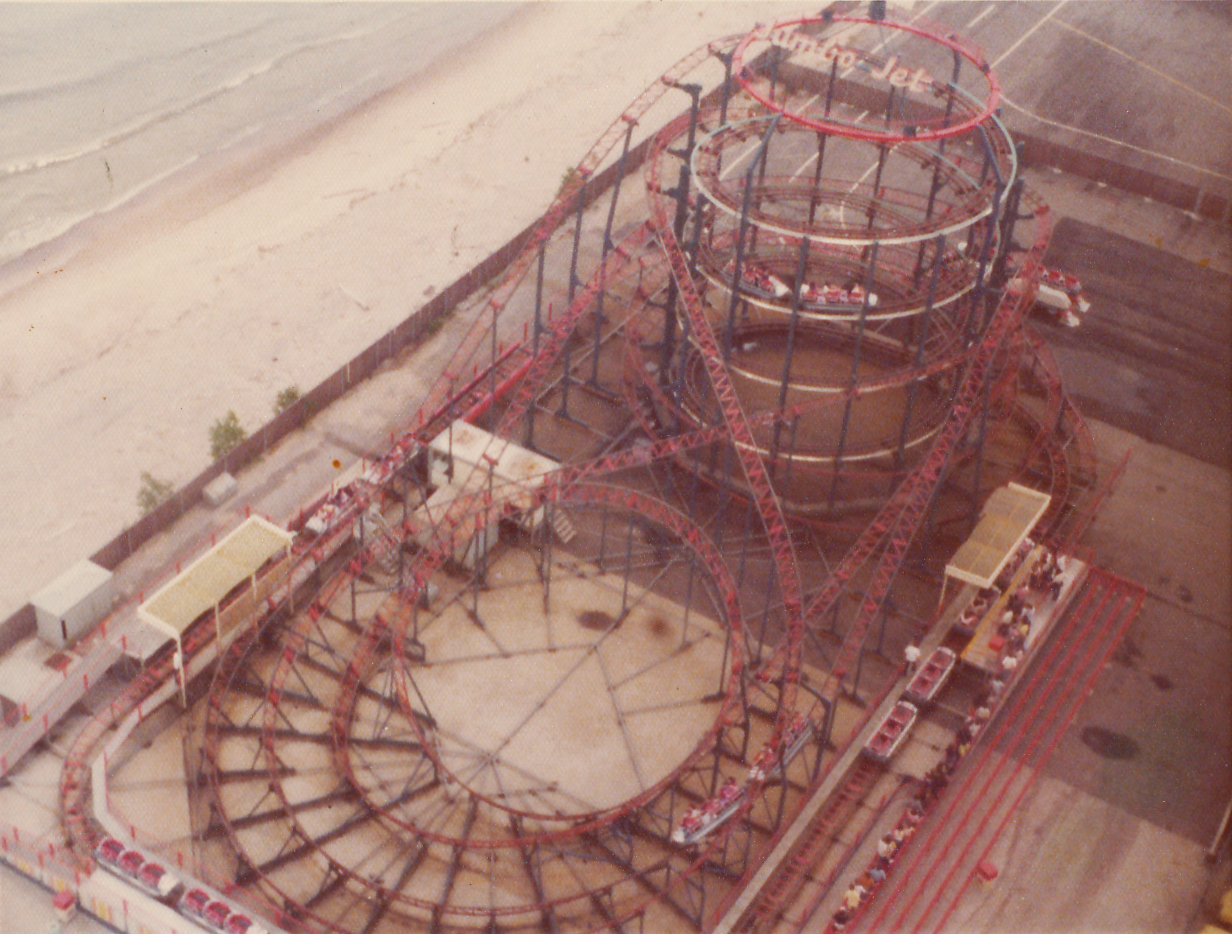
Jumbo Jet, added in 1972 and closed in 1978

- 1960: Scrambler opens
- 1961: Sky wheel, Rotor, and Super Jets (later renamed Star Voyager) open
- 1962: Sky Ride and Scamper open
- 1963: Cedar Point & Lake Erie Railroad and Mill Race open; Wild Mouse closes
- 1964: Blue Streak and Western Cruise (later renamed Paddlewheel Excursions) open
- 1965: Space Spiral, Earthquake, and Jungle Larry's African Safari open
- 1966: Pirate Ride, Trabant, and Upside Down Funhouse open
- 1967: Cedar Downs Racing Derby, Second Rotor, Sealand Marine exhibit, Shoot-the-Rapids, and Frontiertown open; Super Coaster closes
- 1968: Frontier Lift, Kiddieland Carousel and Sky Slide open
- 1969: Cedar Creek Mine Ride, Antique Cars, and the Town Hall Museum open; Scamper closes
- 1970: WildCat, Bayern Kurve, Dodgem No. 2, Monster, Schwabinchen, Calypso, Super Himalaya, Centennial Theatre, Kiddy Kingdom, and Tiki Twirl open; Cedar Point celebrates the park's 100th anniversary
- 1971: Frontier Trail and Camper Village RV Campground open; Zugspitze closes
- 1972: Frontiertown Carousel, Jumbo Jet, Giant Wheel, and Matterhorn open
- 1975: The Cedar Point Cinema opens
- 1976: Corkscrew and Troika open
- 1977: Witches' Wheel opens
- 1978: Gemini opens; Jumbo Jet closes
- 1979: Jr. Gemini and Wave Swinger open

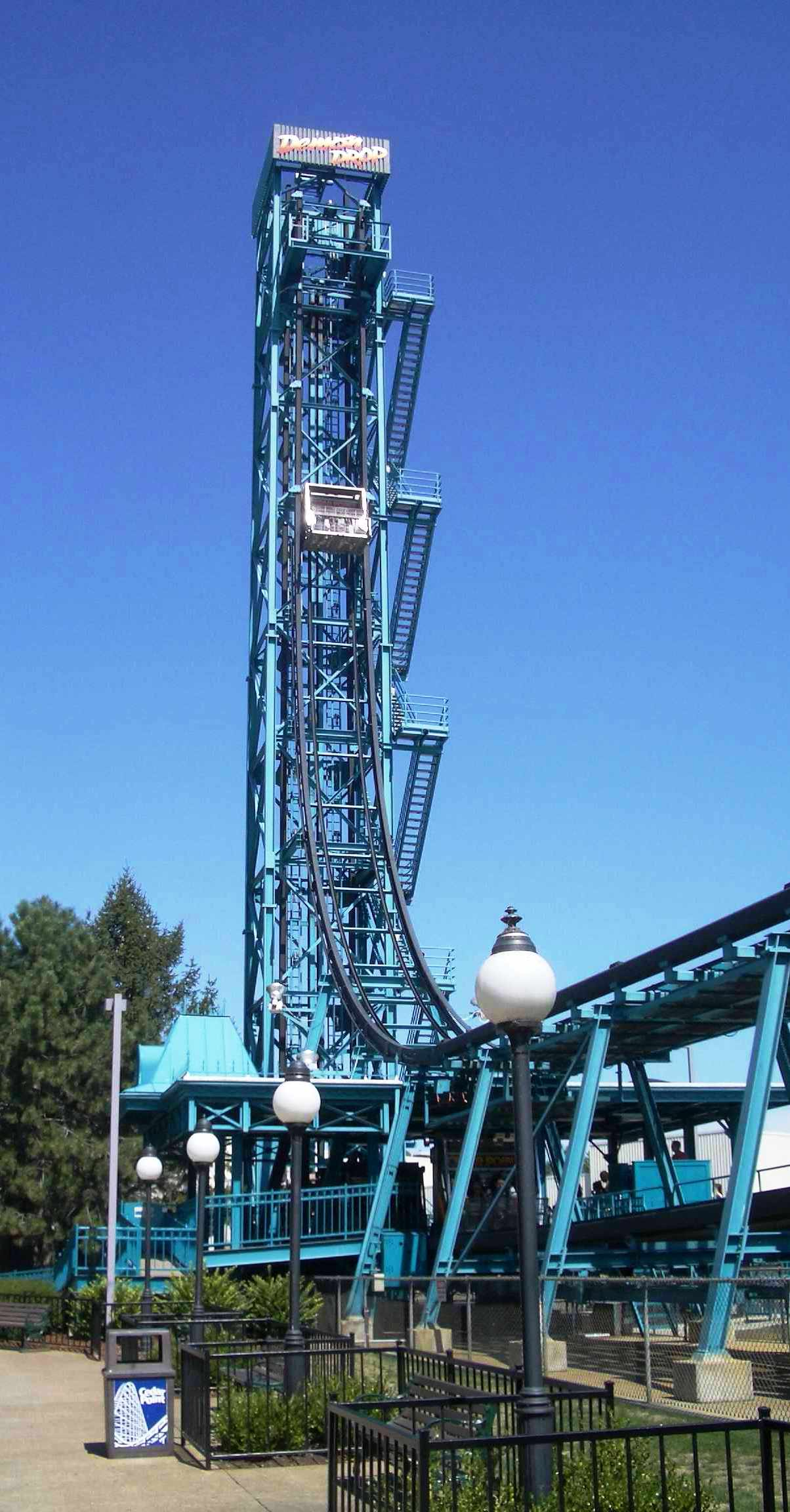
Demon Drop, added in 1983 and closed in 2009

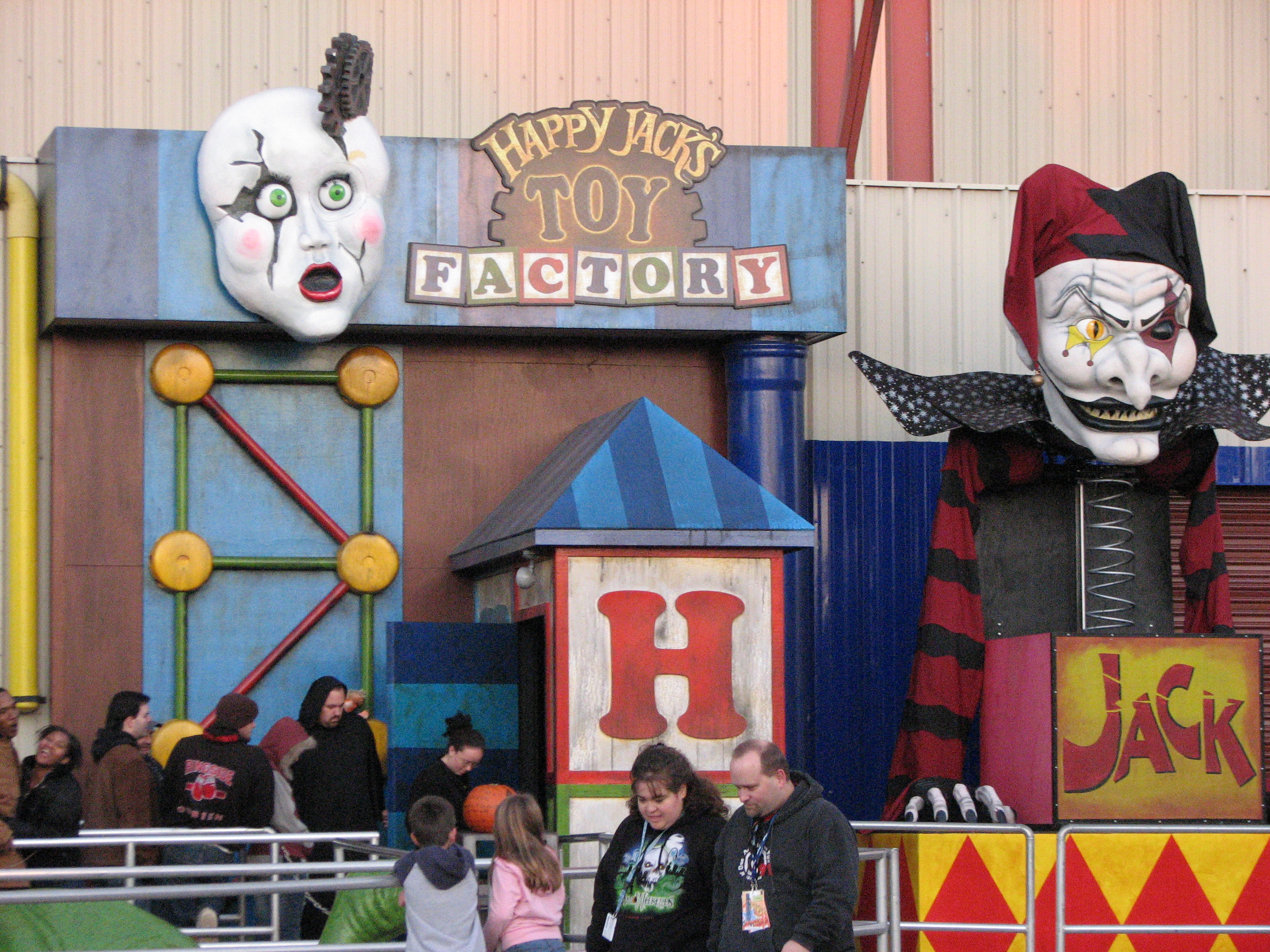
HalloWeekends introduced in 1997

- 1980: Oceana Dolphin stadium opens; Sky Wheel closes
- 1981: Ocean Motion opens; Sky Wheel, Funhouse and Shoot-the-Rapids close
- 1982: White Water Landing and Kid Arthur's Court open
- 1983: Demon Drop opens
- 1984: Tiki Twirl, Rotor, Bayern Curve and Earthquake close
- 1985: Avalanche Run and Berenstain Bear Country indoor complex opens; Frontier Lift closes; WildCat, Matterhorn and Super Himalaya moved to make room for Avalanche Run; Schwabinchen relocated near Ocean Motion
- 1986: Thunder Canyon opens; Sir Rub-A-Dub's Tubs added to Kiddy Kingdom
- 1987: Iron Dragon opens; Monster is relocated to make room for Iron Dragon; Western Cruise station is moved and renamed Paddlewheel Excursions to make room for Iron Dragon
- 1988: Soak City water park opens
- 1989: Magnum XL-200 opens
- 1990: Sandcastle Suites; Main Stream and Tadpole Town added to Soak City; Trabant closes; Avalanche Run is transformed into Disaster Transport
- 1991: Mean Streak opens; Sky Slide closes
- 1992: Challenge Park opens; outdoor complex added to Berenstain Bear Country
- 1993: Snake River Falls opens; Mill Race closes
- 1994: Raptor opens; Jungle Larry's African Safari closes; Calypso and Midway Carousel relocated to make room for Raptor; Turnpike Cars reduced to make room for Raptor; Christmas in the Park is held for the first and last time
- 1995: Zoom Flume and laser light show added; Renegade River and Choo-Choo Lagoon debut in Soak City; Breakers East is added to Hotel Breakers
- 1996: Mantis and Ripcord open; Pirate Ride closes
- 1997: Chaos opens; Soak city expansion; Debut of HalloWeekends as an annual event
- 1998: Power Tower opens; Bumper Boats relocated from Kiddy Kingdom to Gemini Midway
- 1999: Camp Snoopy opens; Breakers Tower is added to Hotel Breakers; Super Himalaya relocated to make room for Camp Snoopy; Oceana Dolphin stadium is renamed The Aquatic Stadium; Kid Arthur's Court closes
2000–present

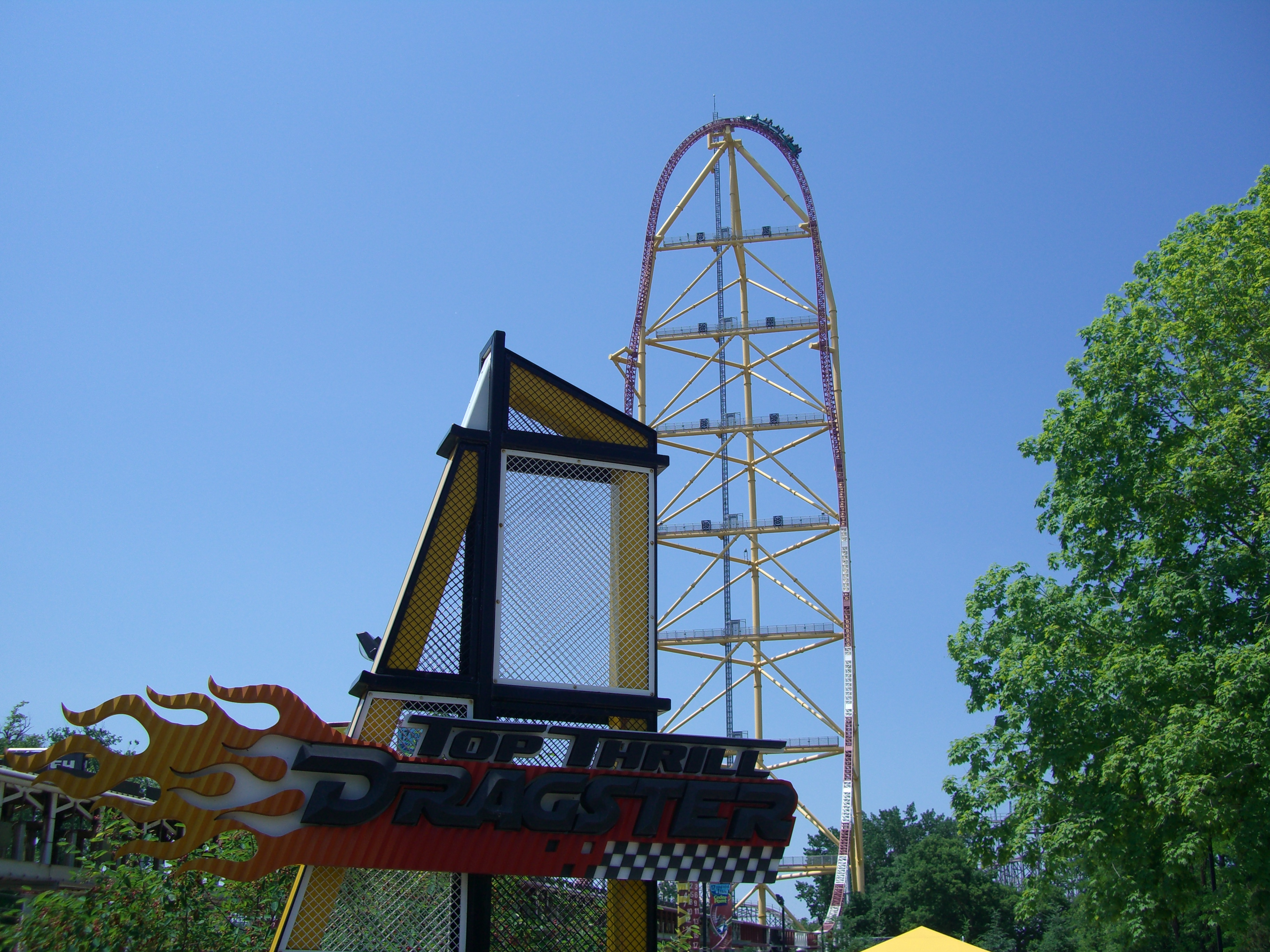
Top Thrill Dragster, added in 2003

- 2000: Millennium Force and Breakers Express open; Giant Wheel relocated to make room for Millennium Force.
- 2001: Lighthouse Point and Johnny Rockets open; The Aquarium closes; VertiGo is open 4 months before being demolished, Dodgem No.1 and Fascination close.
- 2002: Wicked Twister opens; "Snoopy Rocks! On Ice" ice skating show debuts; Cedar Point Cinema is converted into Good Time Theatre; Schwabinchen closes.
- 2003: Top Thrill Dragster opens; Swan Boats close; Troika and Chaos relocated to make room for Top Thrill Dragster.
- 2004: $10 million in capital improvements across the park including Lighthouse Point expansion and Splash City being added to Soak City.
- 2005: maXair opens; White Water Landing closes.
- 2006: Skyhawk opens; Hot Summer Lights nighttime show.
- 2007: Maverick opens; Peanuts Playground closes.
- 2008: Planet Snoopy and SkyScraper open; the Aquatic Stadium is renamed Extreme Sports Stadium with a new show, All Wheels Extreme.
- 2009: Starlight Experience opens; Demon Drop closes.
- 2010: Shoot the Rapids opens; Chaos closes.
- 2011: WindSeeker opens; Ocean Motion relocated to make room for WindSeeker; Paddlewheel Excursions, WildCat, and Speed Slides in Soak City close.
- 2012: Dinosaurs Alive! opens; Dragster H_{2}O added to Soak City; Fast Lane is introduced; Iron Dragon Midway renamed Celebration Plaza with new show, Luminosity – Ignite the Night! and new stage Celebration Stage; Disaster Transport and Space Spiral close.
- 2013: GateKeeper opens; new entrance plaza debuts; Bumper Boats closes.
- 2014: Pipe Scream, Lake Erie Eagles, and SlingShot open with renovated Gemini Midway; Frog Hopper becomes Woodstock's Airmail and relocates to Camp Snoopy; Jr. Gemini entrance moves to Camp Snoopy and is renamed Wilderness Run; Mantis, Turnpike Cars, Sir Rub-a-Dubs Tubs and Good Time Theatre close.
- 2015: Mantis reopens as Rougarou, a floorless coaster; Hotel Breakers finishes renovation; Calypso relocated and renamed Tiki Twirl; Dodgem relocates and cars are replaced with more padding; Maverick gets new restraints; Challenge Racing, Skyscraper, and Shoot the Rapids close.
- 2016: Valravn and a new restaurant called Frontier Inn open; Raptor and Top Thrill Dragster repainted; Mean Streak, Challenge Park, Challenge Golf, and Choo Choo Lagoon at Soak City close.
- 2017: Soak City renamed Cedar Point Shores following expansion; Hotel Breakers expands; Breakers Express expands and becomes Cedar Point's Express Hotel; Cedar Point Sports Center complex opens; RipCord renamed Professor Delbert's Frontier Fling and relocated; Sandcastle Suites and Extreme Sports Stadium close; Last performance of Luminosity – Ignite the Night!.
- 2018: Mean Streak reopens as Steel Vengeance; Dinosaurs Alive! and Witches' Wheel close.
- 2019: Forbidden Frontier opens; Cedars dorms (formerly Cedars Hotel) is demolished.
- 2021: Snake River Expedition opens; Antique Cars in Frontier Town and Wicked Twister close.
- 2022: Top Thrill Dragster closed indefinitely; Johnny Rockets closes.
- 2023: Wild Mouse opens alongside a brand-new Boardwalk area which replaces the Lakeside Midway; Matterhorn and Scrambler relocated to Boardwalk with Scrambler being renamed Atomic Scrambler; Tiki Twirl is renamed back to Calypso. Forbidden Frontier closes.
- 2024: Top Thrill Dragster reopens as Top Thrill 2, Snake River Falls and Celebration Stage close.
- 2025: Siren's Curse opens, Top Thrill 2 reopens after extended downtime.
- 2026: Monster removed.

== List of attractions ==
Thrill level (out of 5)
1 (low) 2 (mild) 3 (moderate) 4 (high) 5 (aggressive)

=== Roller coasters ===
As of May 2025, Cedar Point features 18 roller coasters.

Coaster	Picture	Opened	Manufacturer	Location	Description	Thrill level
Blue Streak		1964	Philadelphia Toboggan Coasters	Main Midway	A wooden roller coaster that is the oldest operating coaster at Cedar Point.	4
Cedar Creek Mine Ride		1969	Arrow Development	Frontier Town	A mine train roller coaster that features two separate lift hills, and is the second-oldest at Cedar Point behind Blue Streak.	4
Corkscrew		1976	Arrow Development	Top Thrill 2 Midway	A steel roller coaster spanning the midway that was the first in the world to feature three inversions.	5
GateKeeper		2013	Bolliger & Mabillard	Boardwalk	A steel roller coaster that featured the highest inversion in the world and broke several records among Wing Coaster models when it first opened.	5
Gemini		1978	Arrow Development	Gemini Midway	A racing roller coaster with steel track situated on a wooden structure, marketed as the tallest, fastest, and steepest in the world at the time of its opening.	5
Iron Dragon		1987	Arrow Dynamics	Millennium Midway	A suspended roller coaster located in the Millennium Midway section of the park.	4
Magnum XL-200		1989	Arrow Dynamics	Gemini Midway	A steel roller coaster that was the first in the world to surpass 200 feet (61 m) in height, which led to the coining of the term hypercoaster.	5
Maverick		2007	Intamin	Frontier Town	A steel launched roller coaster that features multiple launches and a beyond-vertical 95-degree drop.	5
Millennium Force		2000	Intamin	Millennium Midway	A steel roller coaster that was the first in the world to exceed 300 feet (91 m) in height and complete a full circuit, leading to the designation giga coaster. It briefly held world records for height and speed.	5
Raptor		1994	Bolliger & Mabillard	Main Midway	An inverted roller coaster that was the tallest, fastest, and longest of its kind in the world when it first opened. It also introduced the cobra roll inversion to inverted coasters.	5
Rougarou		1996	Bolliger & Mabillard	Millennium Midway	A steel roller coaster that previously opened as Mantis, which was the tallest, fastest, and longest stand-up roller coaster in the world when it opened. It was converted to a Floorless Coaster model and renamed Rougarou for the 2015 season, featuring new trains, new colors, and a new theme.	5
Siren's Curse		2025	Vekoma	Main Midway	A steel roller coaster featuring a tilt track.	5
Steel Vengeance		2018	Rocky Mountain Construction	Frontier Town	A steel roller coaster that utilizes a wooden structure exceeding 200 feet (61 m) in height, marketed as the first hybrid hypercoaster in the world.	5
Top Thrill 2		2024	Intamin	Top Thrill 2 Midway	A launched roller coaster that opened as the tallest and fastest roller coaster in the world, reaching a height of 420 feet (130 m) and a maximum speed of 120 mph (190 km/h). Originally built by Intamin in 2003 and later renovated by Zamperla for the 2024 season. The ride would remain closed for much of the 2024 season for extensive repairs, later reopening the following year.	5
Valravn		2016	Bolliger & Mabillard	Main Midway	A steel roller coaster that opened as the tallest, fastest, and longest Dive Coaster model in the world.	5
Wilderness Run		1979	Intamin	Camp Snoopy	A steel kiddie roller coaster previously known as Jr. Gemini and renamed Wilderness Run in 2014. It was the first coaster manufactured by Intamin.	2
Wild Mouse		2023	Zamperla	Boardwalk	A custom spinning wild mouse roller coaster that opened on May 6, 2023. Cars reach a maximum speed of 35 mph (56 km/h), and each individual car seats four passengers.	4
Woodstock Express		1999	Vekoma	Camp Snoopy	A steel Junior Coaster model from Vekoma located within Camp Snoopy.	4

=== Thrill rides ===
Cedar Point has 14 thrill rides. The newest is SlingShot, which was introduced in 2014.

Ride	Year opened	Manufacturer	Location	Description	Thrill level
Atomic Scrambler	1960	Eli Bridge Company	Boardwalk	A Scrambler ride that is one of the oldest rides operating at Cedar Point. Formerly named Scrambler until being relocated to the Boardwalk section of the park in 2023.	3
Calypso	1970	Mack Rides	Boardwalk	A spinning ride that spins riders in two degrees of motion. Previously known as Tiki Twirl when it was relocated in 2016. Name reverted to Calypso in 2023 when the Lakeside Midway became the Boardwalk	3
Cedar Downs Racing Derby	1967	Prior and Church	Main Midway	A high-speed, circular ride resembling a carousel themed to horse racing. It is one of only two remaining installations of its kind still operating in the United States alongside the installation in Playland (New York). Manufactured in 1920 by Prior and Church, the ride was sold to Cedar Point in 1965. It was originally located at the defunct Euclid Beach Park in east Cleveland, where it was called "Great American Racing Derby", and is listed on the National Register of Historic Places.	3
Dodgem	1970	Soli of Italy	Boardwalk	A classic bumper cars attraction.	4
Matterhorn	1972	Mack Rides	Boardwalk	A circular matterhorn ride that swings riders as it moves in a clockwise motion while traveling up and down. Relocated to the new Boardwalk area in 2023.	3
maXair	2005	HUSS Park Attractions	Boardwalk	A Giant Frisbee ride; it is one of only two Giant Frisbees made by HUSS in the world.	5
Ocean Motion	1981	HUSS Park Attractions	Main Midway	A swinging pirate ship ride that reaches a height of 65 feet (20 m).	3
Power Tower	1998	S&S Worldwide	Top Thrill 2 Midway	A combo drop tower ride featuring both a Space Shot and a Turbo Drop. Power Tower is the only four-towered drop tower ride in the world, devoting two towers to each drop cycle.	5
Skyhawk	2006	S&S Worldwide	Frontier Town	A Screamin' Swing ride.	5
SlingShot	2014	Funtime	Gemini Midway	A 236 feet (72 m) tall Reverse bungee ride that launches riders up 360 feet (110 m) at speeds up to 62 miles per hour (100 km/h). SlingShot is an additional charge attraction.	5
Super Himalaya	1970	Mack Rides	Top Thrill 2 Midway	A circular Music Express ride that travels in a clockwise motion on a track of various elevations.	3
Troika	1976	HUSS Park Attractions	Boardwalk	A Troika ride in which riders reach a height of 25 feet (7.6 m).	3
Wave Swinger	1979	Zierer	Frontier Town	A wave swinger ride featuring hand painted murals. Riders reach a height of 16 feet (4.9 m).	3
WindSeeker	2011	Mondial	Boardwalk	A WindSeeker tower swinger ride. It was one of the first of its kind.	4

=== Family rides ===
Cedar Point has 8 family rides/attractions.

Ride	Year opened	Manufacturer	Location	Description	Thrill level
Cadillac Cars	1958	Arrow Development	Main Midway	An antique car track ride with cars designed to look like a 1910 Cadillac.	3
Cedar Point & Lake Erie Railroad	1963	Engines: Davenport Locomotive Works; H.K. Porter, Inc.; Vulcan Iron Works	Millennium Midway and Frontier Town	A 15-minute, western-themed train excursion encompasses a two-mile (3.2 km) trip. The 3 ft (914 mm) narrow gauge train features two stations: one near Iron Dragon and the other near Steel Vengeance.	1
Giant Wheel	1972	Anton Schwarzkopf	Boardwalk	A 136 feet (41.5 m) tall, observation wheel.	2
Lake Erie Eagles	2014	Larson International	Gemini Midway	A flying eagles ride with eight carriages that each have a paddle, enabling guests to change the movement of their carriage.	3
Midway Carousel	1946	Daniel Muller	Main Midway	A classic carousel ride. One of two known remaining Daniel Muller Carousels, it was built in 1912 and moved to Cedar Point in 1946. It is the oldest operating ride at Cedar Point and is listed on the NRHP. A non-operational Wurlitzer #153 Band Organ can be seen on the ride.	1
Pipe Scream	2014	Zamperla	Gemini Midway	A Skater Coaster ride where a single car travels along a 302-foot (92 m) long, U-shaped track, reaching a height of 43 feet (13 m).	4
Sky Ride	1962	Von Roll	Main Midway	A standard gondola lift ride. It transports passengers from the front of the park to a station near Corkscrew. The cars used are from the defunct Frontier Lift.	3

=== Water ride ===
Cedar Point has one water ride, excluding attractions located in Cedar Point Shores.

Ride	Opened	Manufacturer	Location	Description	Thrill level
Thunder Canyon	1986	Intamin	Frontier Trail	A river rafting ride. Thunder Canyon normally closes in late August and is transformed into a HalloWeekends attraction called CornStalkers 2.0: Revenge of the Pumpkin Heads.	4

=== Children's rides ===
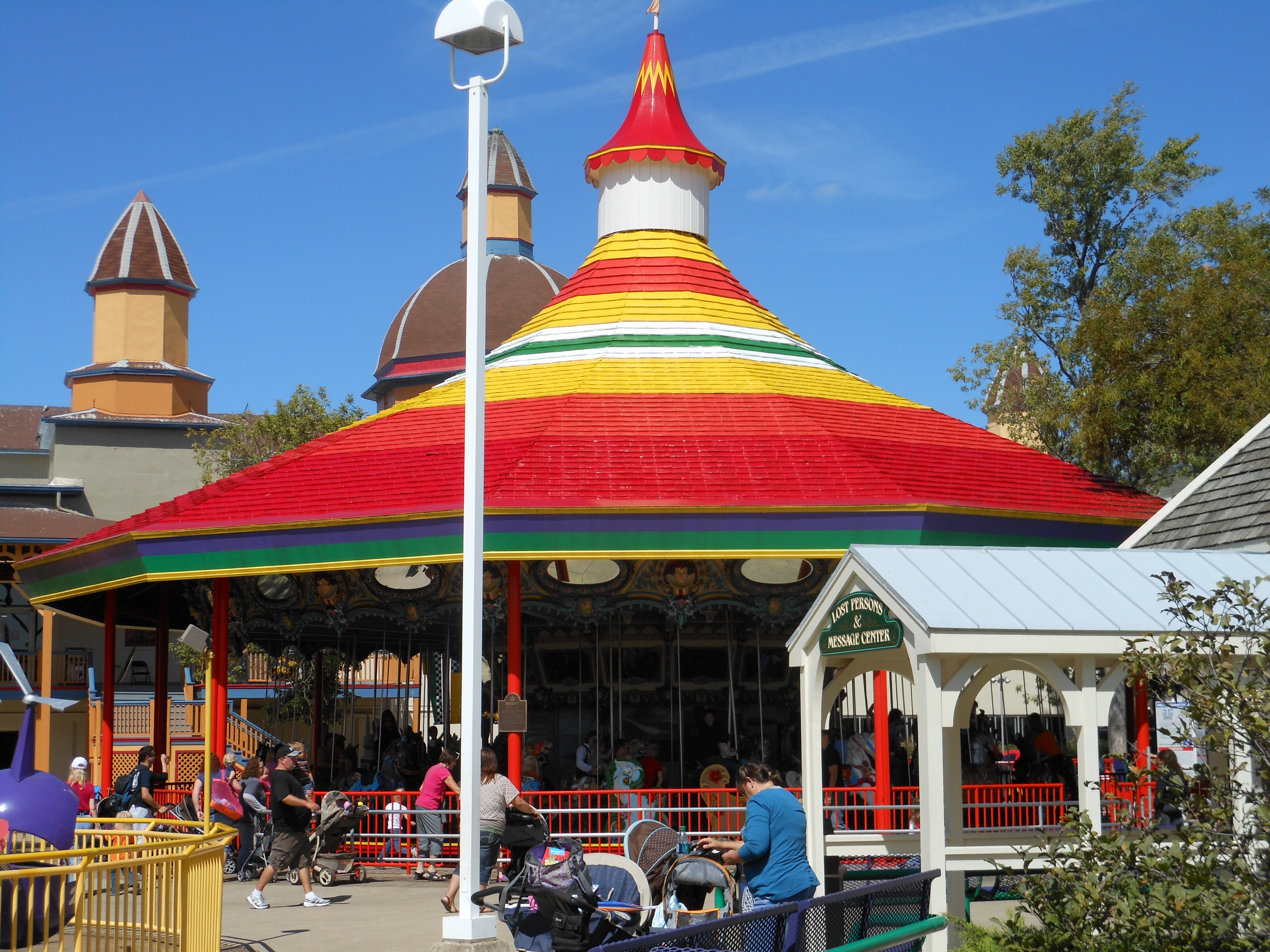
A 1924 William H. Dentzel Carousel located in Kiddy Kingdom

Kiddy Kingdom opened in 1970 as Kiddieland but was renamed in 1993. It is located near Gatekeeper and contains 11 rides.

Name	Thrill level
4x4's	2
Dune Buggies	1
Helicopters	2
Kiddy Kingdom Carousel	1
Motorcycles	1
Mustangs	1
Police Cars	1
Rock Spin & Turn	2
Roto Whip	2
Sky Fighters	2
Space Age	2

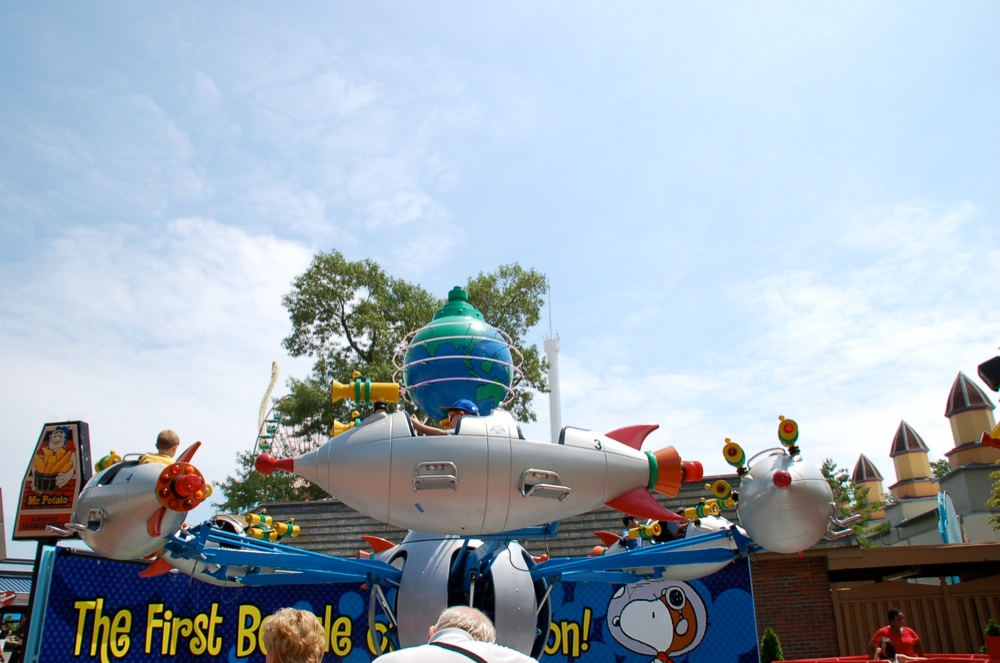
Snoopy's Space Race in the Planet Snoopy section of the park

Planet Snoopy is a children's area that opened in 2008. All of its rides were relocated from the defunct Geauga Lake amusement park, except for Joe Cools Dodgem School. It is located near WindSeeker and contains eight rides.

Name	Thrill level
Flying Ace Balloon Race	2
Joe Cool's Dodgem School	2
Kite Eating Tree	2
Peanuts Road Rally	1
Snoopy's Deep Sea Divers	2
Snoopy's Space Race	2
Snoopy's Express Railroad	1
Woodstock's Whirlybirds	2

Camp Snoopy opened in 1999 and is located near Gemini. It contains seven rides and two kiddie coasters.

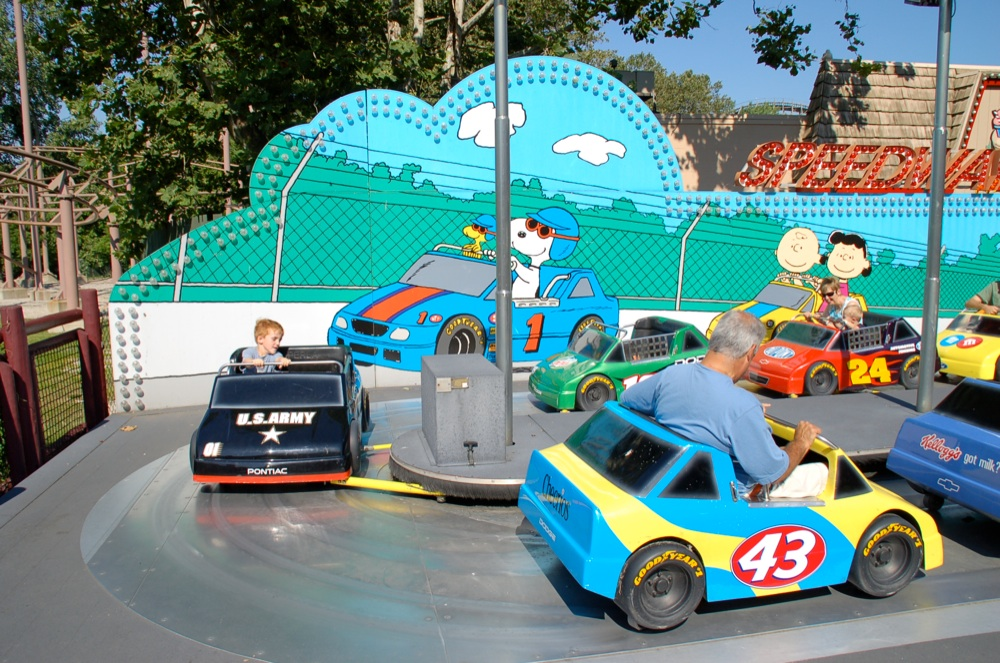
Peanuts 500 in Camp Snoopy

Name	Thrill level
Balloon Race	2
Camp Bus	2
Charlie Brown's Wind Up	2
Linus's Beetle Bugs	2
Peanuts 500	2
Red Baron	2
Wilderness Run	2
Woodstock Express	4
Woodstock's Airmail	2

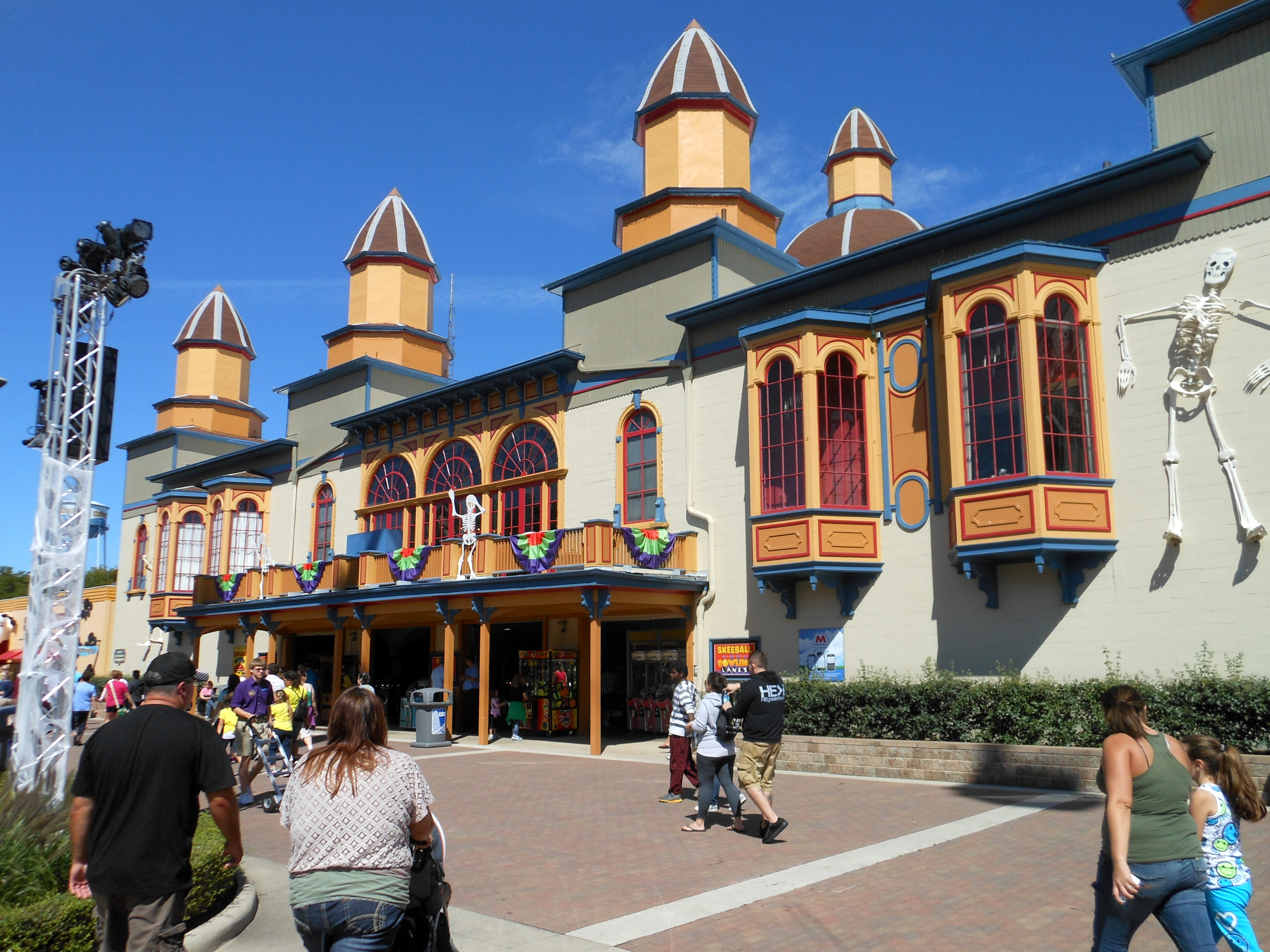
The Coliseum during HalloWeekends in 2012

=== Cedar Point Coliseum ===
Constructed in 1906, the coliseum has a ballroom on the top floor with a large arcade on the bottom floor.

=== Cedar Point Shores ===
Cedar Point's water park opened in 1988 as Soak City and was renamed Cedar Point Shores following an announcement on August 18, 2016. It is adjacent to Cedar Point and requires separate admission.

== Fast Lane ==
Fast Lane, introduced at Cedar Point in 2012, is a secondary queue system that offers shorter wait times on the park's most popular rides. In addition to the standard admission charge, visitors can bypass the standard wait line by purchasing a wristband that grants access to the Fast Lane queue. A “limited” number of wristbands are sold each day. The two options available for purchase are "Fast Lane" and "Fast Lane Plus". The standard Fast Lane offers access to 17 attractions, while Fast Lane Plus covers the same rides and adds Valravn, Maverick, Millennium Force, Top Thrill 2, Sirens Curse and Steel Vengeance.

Beginning in the 2014 season, Cedar Point offers a Halloween-themed version of Fast Lane called Fright Lane, available during HalloWeekends. This version provides priority access to haunted attractions within the park.

== Awards/rankings ==
=== Awards ===
Cedar Point won the Golden Ticket Award from Amusement Today for "Best Amusement Park in the World" for 16 consecutive years from 1997 to 2013. The park has also placed in categories for "Friendliest Park Staff" (2002, 2004 – 2006), "Cleanest Park" (2004, 2005), "Best Capacity" (1998–2002), "Best Kid's Area" (2004, 2013), "Best Outdoor Night Production" (2004–2007), "Best Shows" (2004, 2005), "Best Games Area" (2002), "Best Souvenirs" (2002), and "Best Halloween Event" (2005 – 2008, 2013, 2014). The park also won the Golden Ticket Award for "Best New Ride of 2007" with the roller coaster Maverick. Cedar Point has also won several IAAPA awards, including the Applause Award in 1996.

=== Rankings ===
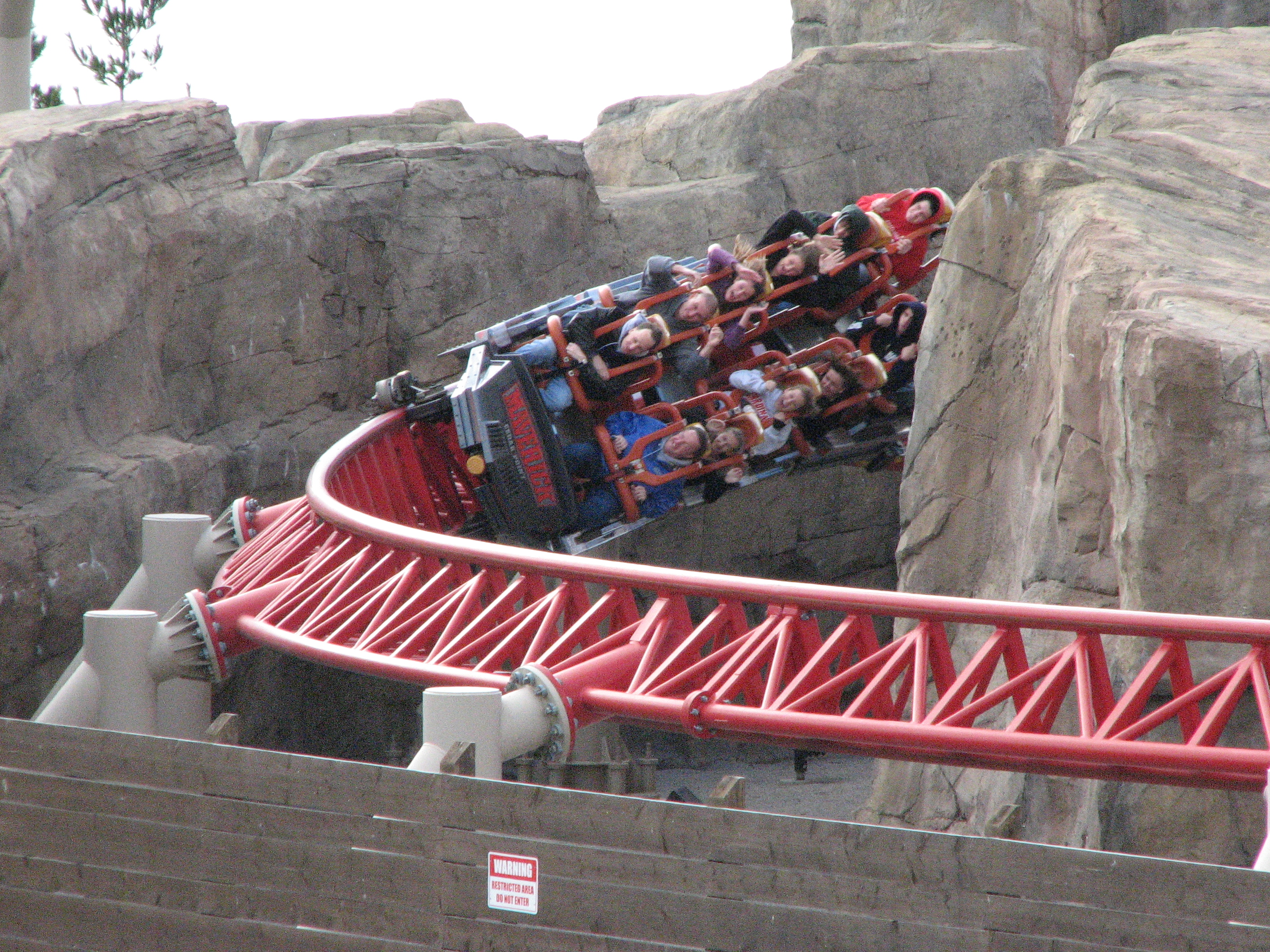
Maverick, new in 2007, was awarded "Best New Ride of 2007".

Cedar Point's roller coasters have consistently ranked high in the Golden Ticket Awards. In the 2013 rankings, GateKeeper debuted at 28th, marking the first time that the park had six steel roller coasters in the top 50. Later, the number changed to five, which are all in the top 25. The following steel and wooden coasters were ranked by Amusement Today in 2019:

==== Steel ====
- Millennium Force: 2nd
- Steel Vengeance: 3rd
- Maverick: 13th
- Magnum XL-200: 18th
- Top Thrill Dragster: 21st

==== Wooden ====
- Blue Streak: 38th

=== Attendance ===
In 1960, the park's attendance reached 1 million for the first time. Five years later, the attendance reached 2 million. In 1975, attendance reached 3 million for the first time. In 2017, the park was ranked fourteenth overall in North America for attendance and first in the United States among seasonal amusement parks, with an estimated 3.6 million visitors. Cedar Point's attendance peaked in 1994 with 3.6 million visitors, a feat not matched again until 2016, and beaten in 2018/2019. In 2020, due to the COVID-19 pandemic, there was a greatly reduced number of visitors at the park, from 3.73 million in 2019, down to only 1.02 million in 2020. However, regular attendance numbers would reappear in 2021. In 2024, 3.78 million visitors attended the park, a 5% increase from 2023.

2003	2004	2005	2006	2007	2008	2009	2010	2011	2012	2013	2014	2015	2016	2017	2018	2019	2020	2021	2022	2023	2024
3.30	3.20	3.10	3.07	3.12	3.20	2.94	3.05	3.14	3.22	3.38	3.25	3.51	3.60	3.60	3.68	3.73	1.02	3.33	3.44	3.60	3.78

== Resorts ==
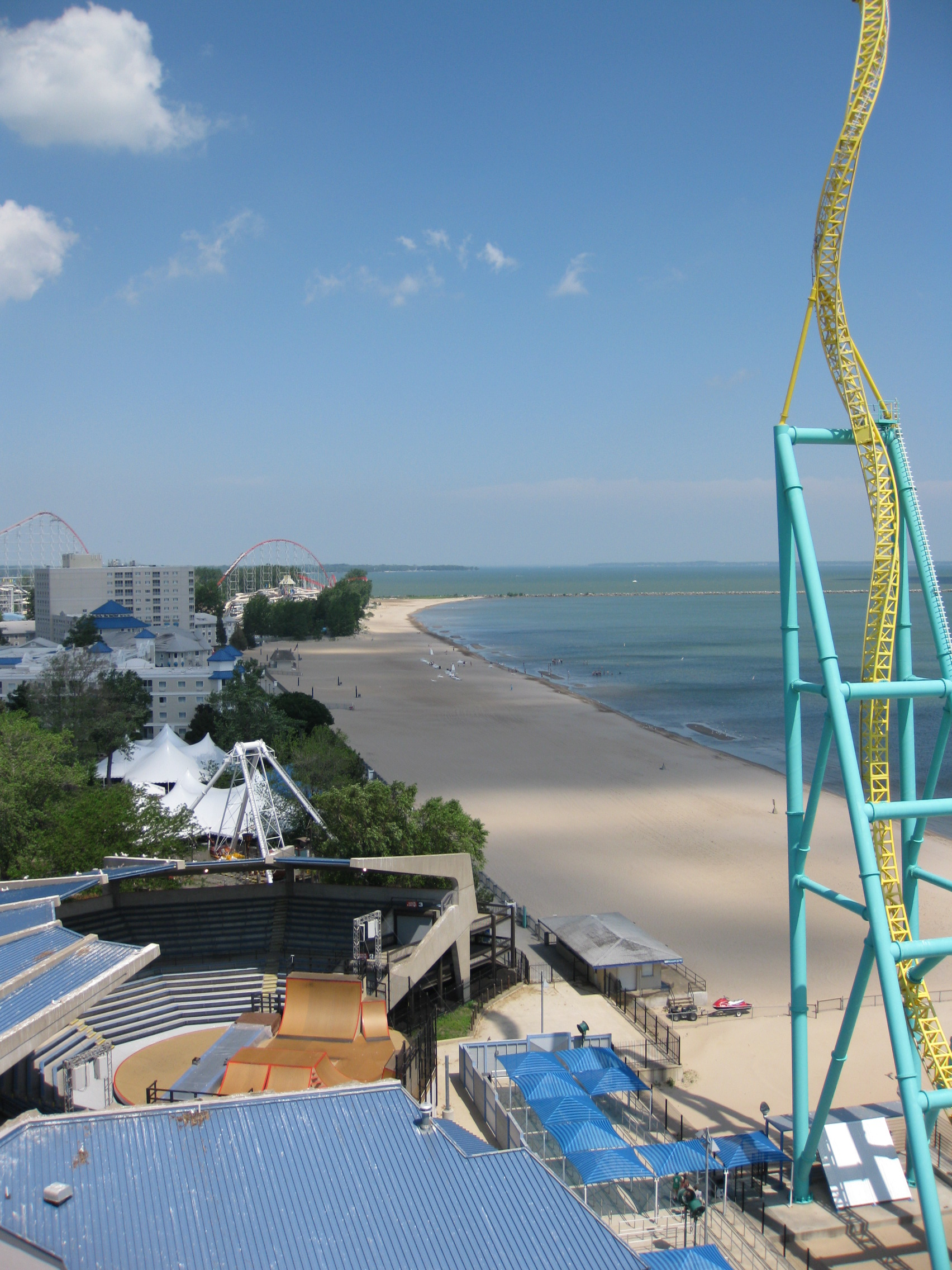
Cedar Point Beach (2008)

Cedar Point owns and operates six resorts, several of which are located on park grounds. Guests staying at the resorts are given early access to the park before it opens to the general public, during which time a select number of rides are available such as Steel Vengeance and Millennium Force. Cedar Point invested $60 million over the course of three years renovating many of the resorts, beginning in 2013.

=== On-site resorts, marina, and campgrounds ===
Hotel Breakers, built in 1905, is the oldest resort at Cedar Point and the closest one to the park. It has undergone numerous renovations over the years, with the most recent occurring in 2015 that cost Cedar Fair an estimated $50 million. The resort features over 650 rooms and suites, as well as a variety of outdoor amenities including live entertainment and beach activities.

Lighthouse Point, located along the west bank of the peninsula, contains 64 cottages and 40 cabins. The centerpiece of Lighthouse Point is the Cedar Point Light, which was built in 1862 and is the oldest existing structure on the peninsula.

Camper Village is the only overnight location that provides accommodations for recreational vehicles (RV). Deluxe sites offer electricity, water, sewer and cable. Amenities include the Camper Village Store, an outdoor pool, a shuffleboard court, and a game room.

The Cedar Point Marina is located on the Sandusky Bay side of the peninsula, directly adjacent to the amusement park. It offers amenities geared toward boaters, such as fuel docks and a floating pier. Other amenities include on-site restaurants and stores. Since 2016 the Jet Express has included Cedar Point's marina in its route from Sandusky to Kelleys Island, and Put-in-Bay.

=== Off-site Cedar Point-owned resorts ===
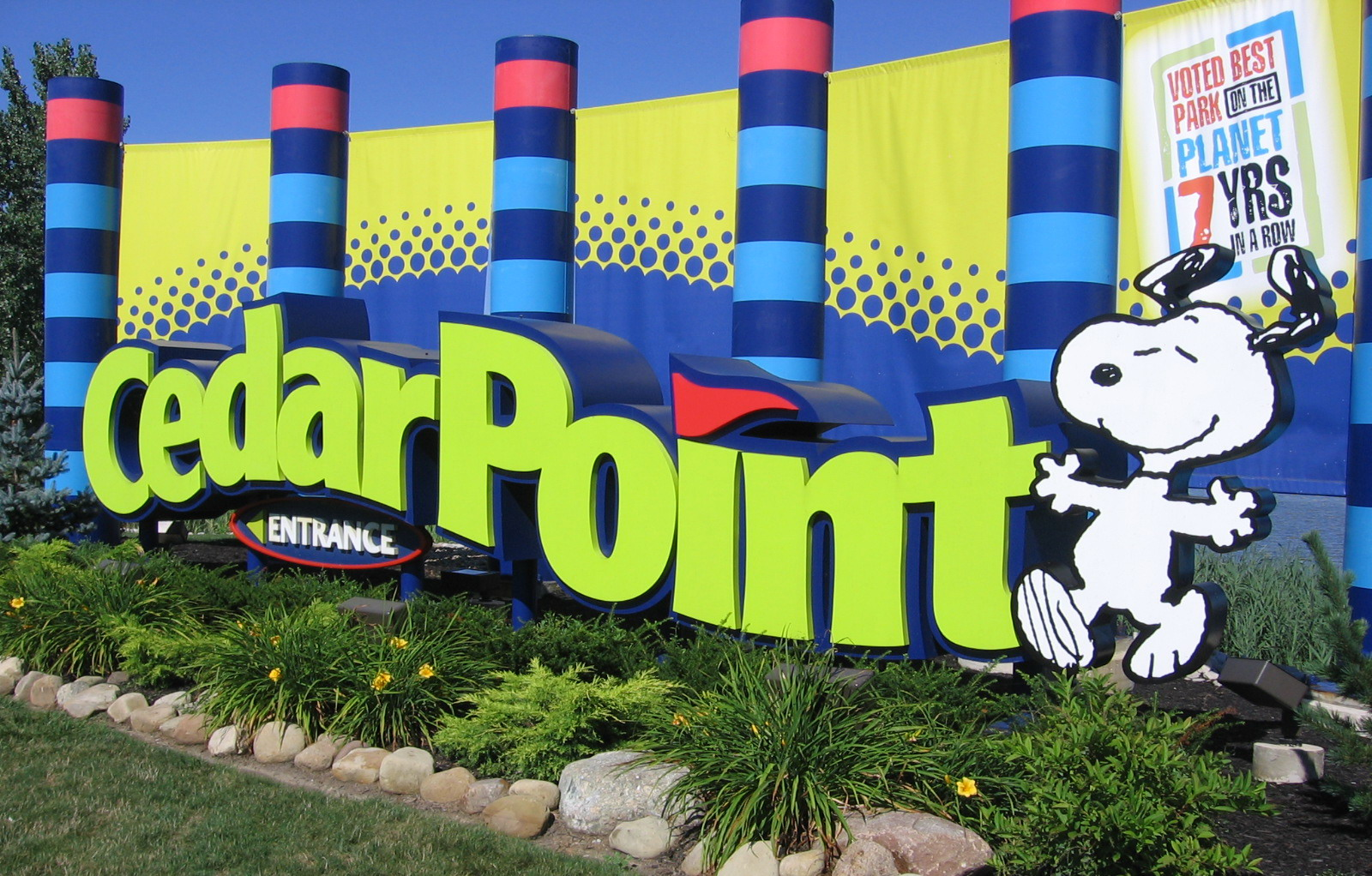
Entrance sign in 2005

Castaway Bay is an indoor waterpark resort opened by Cedar Fair in November 2004. It houses over 38,000 square feet (3,500 m^{2}) of water attractions, shops, and restaurants, in addition to more than 200 guest rooms and a marina.

Cedar Point's Express Hotel, formerly Breakers Express, is a hotel located one mile (one point six kilometres) from Cedar Point. Opened in 2000, it is the closest off-site hotel to the peninsula and includes over 400 guest rooms.

Sawmill Creek by Cedar Point Resorts, located in nearby Huron, Ohio, is a nearby resort purchased by Cedar Fair for $13.5 million in 2019. Amenities include restaurants, shopping, a conference center, and an 18-hole golf course.

== National Register of Historic Places ==
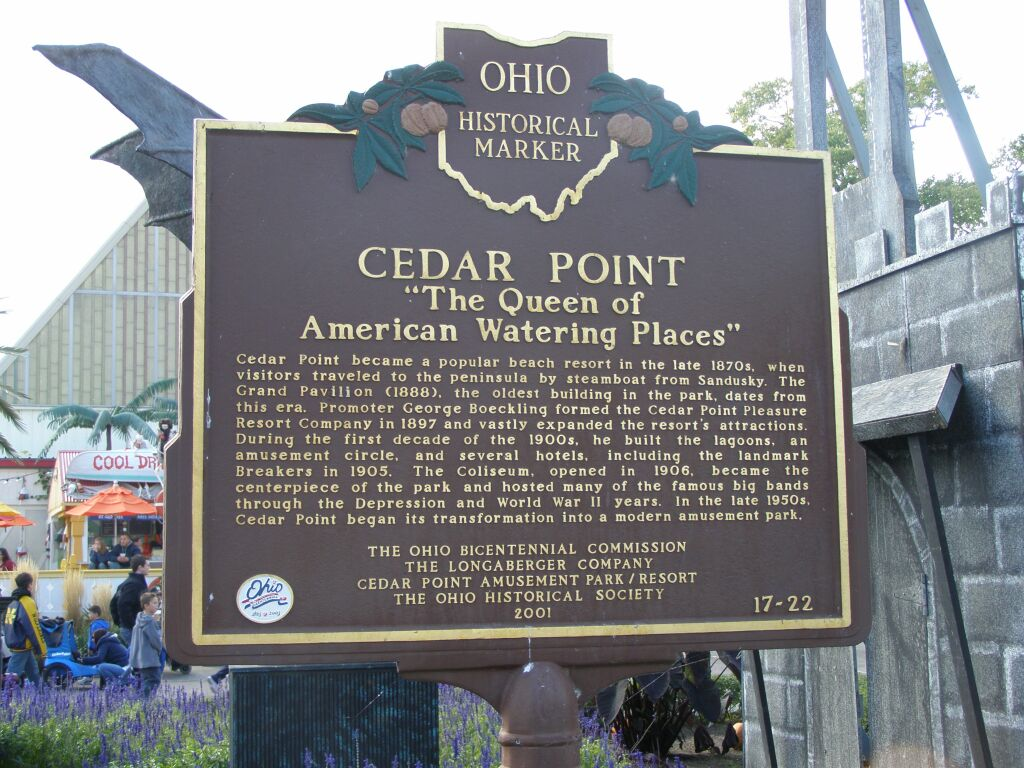
Historical marker erected in 2001

Cedar Point features several historic buildings on the peninsula. Many of the buildings and structures on the peninsula are from the late 1800s or early 1900s. The oldest structure on the peninsula is the Cedar Point Light. It is a restored lighthouse that was built in 1862 and was added to the National Register of Historic Places (NRHP) on July 19, 1984. Located along the main midway is the Coliseum. The Coliseum was built in 1906 with the newly expanded Midway. It has a ballroom known for holding several dances that helped Cedar Point out of The Depression. It was added to the NRHP on October 2, 1982. Another building that is listed on the NRHP is the U.S. Coast Guard Building located along Perimeter Road that stretches around the peninsula.

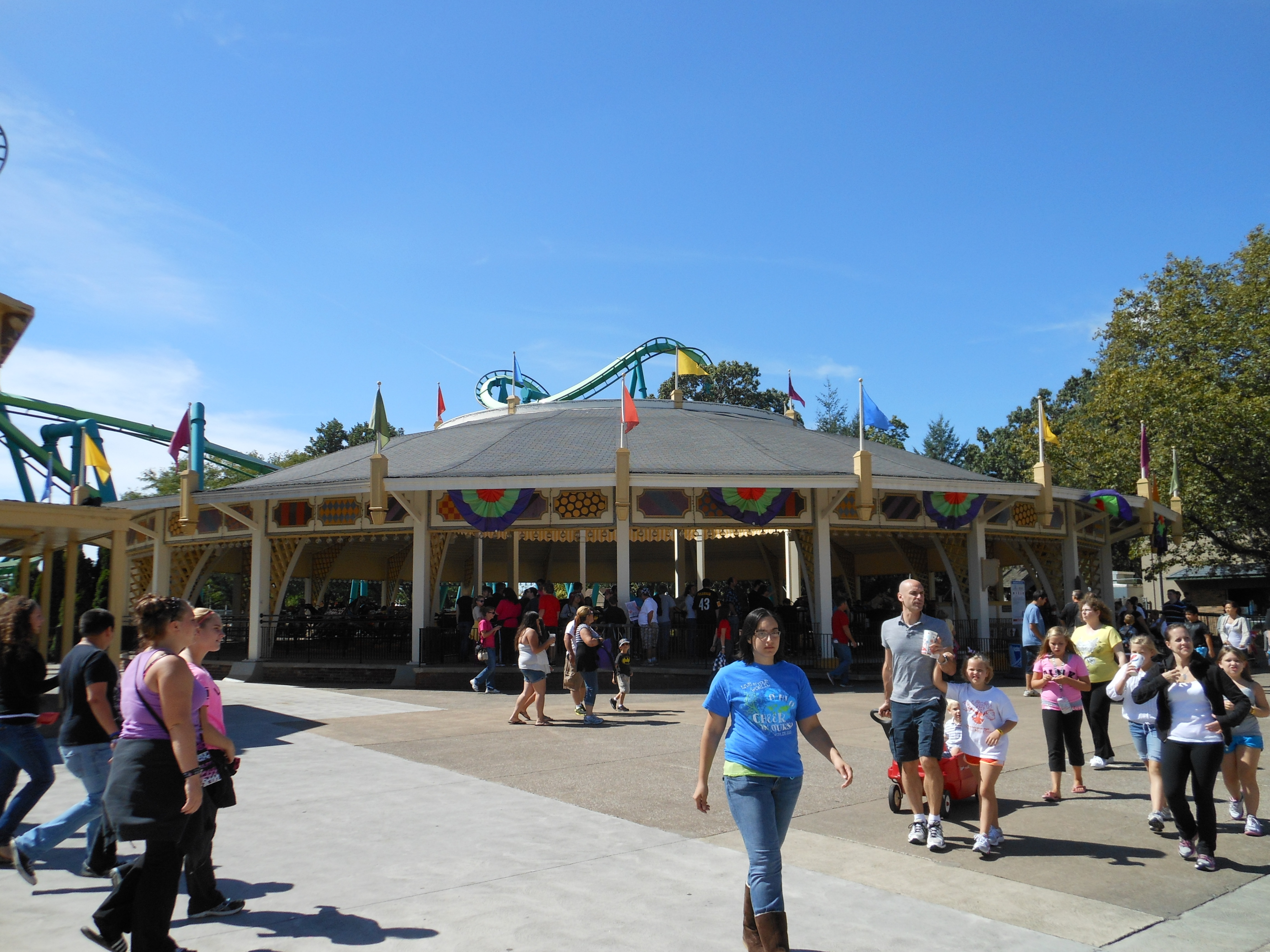
Cedar Downs Racing Derby

All three of Cedar Point's carousels are listed on the National Register of Historic Places. The Midway Carousel, otherwise known as the Daniel C. Muller Carousel, is located at the front of the park. It opened in 1912 and was brought to Cedar Point in 1946. A Sandusky family purchased the ride and operated it at the park. It became the property of Cedar Point in 1963. It is Cedar Point's oldest operating ride and was added to the NRHP on October 20, 1982. The second carousel at the park is the Cedar Downs Racing Derby, also known as the Great American Racing Derby. It originally opened at Euclid Beach Park in 1921 and was transported to Cedar Point for the 1967 season. It is only one of two racing carousels still operating in the United States, and was added to the NRHP on November 8, 1990. The third carousel is the Kiddy Kingdom Carousel, located in Kiddy Kingdom. It is also known as the William H. Dentzel 1924 Carousel and opened at Cedar Point in 1968. It was added to the NRHP on November 8, 1990.

Cedar Point used to have a fourth carousel, known as the Frontier Carousel, located in Frontiertown next to the Wave Swinger. It opened at Cedar Point in 1972 when it was bought from a family in Lansing, Michigan. It was listed on the NRHP on November 8, 1990. After the 1994 season, the carousel closed and was moved to Dorney Park & Wildwater Kingdom, where it now operates under the name Antique Carousel. Its building is currently used to house a HalloWeekends attraction.

=== Former ===
Cedar Point's oldest hotel is the Hotel Breakers. It opened in 1905 during the "golden age" of resort hotels. It was added to the NRHP on March 9, 1987. After several major alterations, most notably the Breakers Tower in 1998, the National Park Service removed the Hotel Breakers from the NRHP on August 7, 2001.

== In popular culture ==
Cedar Point has had a cultural influence on American society as evidenced in many forms of media such as books, television, and film. In the 1940 biographical film Knute Rockne, All American documenting the life of famous Notre Dame football coach Knute Rockne, Cedar Point is featured at a pivotal point in the story. In 1913, Knute works as a lifeguard on a beach at Cedar Point, where he and his college roommate Gus Dorais worked on the forward pass. The concept, which was first used in a scrimmage game at Cedar Point, would revolutionize the sport and the film would later be preserved in the Library of Congress National Film Registry. In 2004, an independently produced film, Close Encounters of the Fourth Kind: Infestation From Mars, was shot at several historic locations around Sandusky including Cedar Point. Dick Kinzel, CEO of Cedar Fair at the time, had a brief speaking role in the film.

In the 2006 book The Warrior Heir by Cinda Williams Chima, the main characters take a field trip to Cedar Point with their high school class. In a 2010 episode of Bert the Conqueror on the Travel Channel, Bert takes the "Foursome Fearsome" roller-coaster challenge in which he rides the four fastest and tallest coasters in the park in under an hour. A 2012 episode of Travel Channel's Off Limits takes a look at off-season maintenance at the park and features the host, Don Wildman, working with the maintenance crew on Mean Streak and Millennium Force. In 2012, the "Extreme Heights" and "Speed Demons" episodes of Insane Coaster Wars on the Travel Channel feature Cedar Point coasters Millennium Force and Top Thrill Dragster, respectively. Commentary for the series was primarily filmed at Cedar Point. In 2021 an episode of Dinner: Impossible aired featuring host Robert Irvine preparing a meal celebrating the park's 150th anniversary.

== See also ==
- List of former Cedar Point attractions
- Incidents at Cedar Point
- HalloWeekends
