= Snake River Falls =

Defunct water ride at Cedar Point

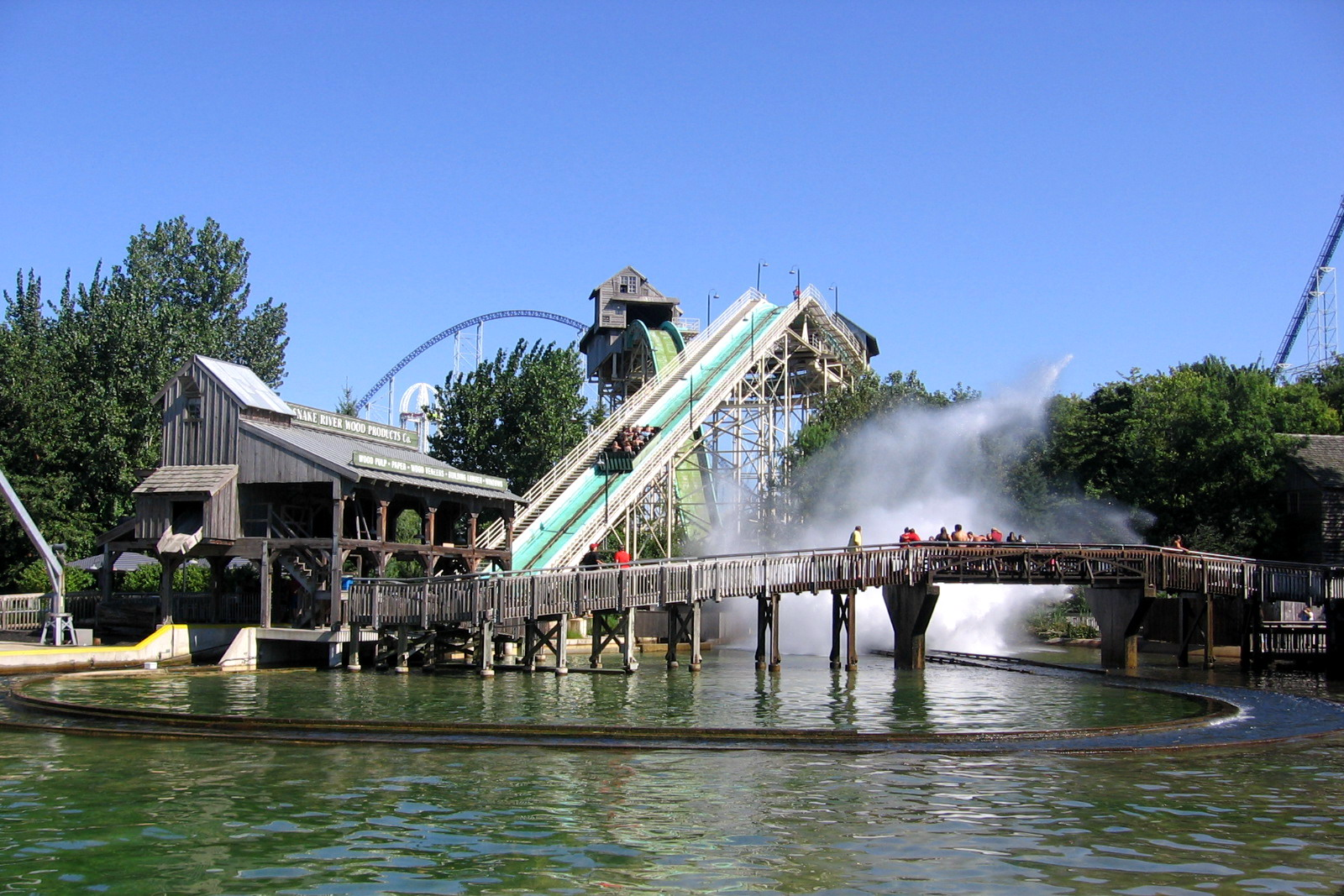

Cedar Point
- Area: Frontier Town
- Coordinates: 41°29′2.76″N 82°41′27.84″W
- Status: Removed
- Opening date: May 8, 1993
- Closing date: September 2, 2024

General statistics
- Type: Shoot the Chute
- Manufacturer: Arrow Dynamics
- Model: Shoot-the-Chutes
- Height: 82 ft (25 m)
- Speed: 40 mph (64 km/h)
- Max vertical angle: 50°
- Duration: 2:20
- Height restriction: 48 in (122 cm)
- Fast Lane was available

Snake River Falls was a shoot-the-chutes water ride attraction located at Cedar Point in Sandusky, Ohio. Designed by Arrow Dynamics, the ride opened to the public on May 8, 1993. Its theme was loosely based on a wood packing company.

Snake River Falls debuted as the tallest, fastest and steepest water ride in the world. Guests board flat bottom, 20-passenger boats that advance directly onto the lift hill. Upon reaching the top of the 82-foot-tall (25 m) hill, the boats make a U-turn left into a 50-degree splashdown drop at 40 mph (64 km/h). A bridge sits at the bottom of the hill directly over the path of the ride providing spectators a view up close and the opportunity to get wet. An artificial mountain was originally planned to sit underneath the highest point of the track, but the idea was later abandoned.

From the ride's opening in 1993 until the 2012 season, Snake River Falls was sponsored by Pepsi. After Cedar Point switched to Coca-Cola in 2013, the ride operated without a sponsor. On August 2, 2024, Cedar Point announced that the ride would close permanently and take its final plunge on September 2, 2024 to make way for future expansion. The ride was then demolished over the offseason.

On the final operating day of the ride, commemorative t-shirts and buttons could be purchased. In addition, the riders of the final public boat each received an exclusive mug and certificate.

The ride was subsequently scrapped.

== Incidents ==
- On Wednesday, July 3, 2013, a boat on Snake River Falls jumped the track after the drop, dislodging the boat. Riders did not report any injuries. Cedar Point stated the incident was caused by a low water level throughout the ride. The ride was closed down for the day and inspected, and reopened on Sunday.
