= List of former Cedar Point attractions =

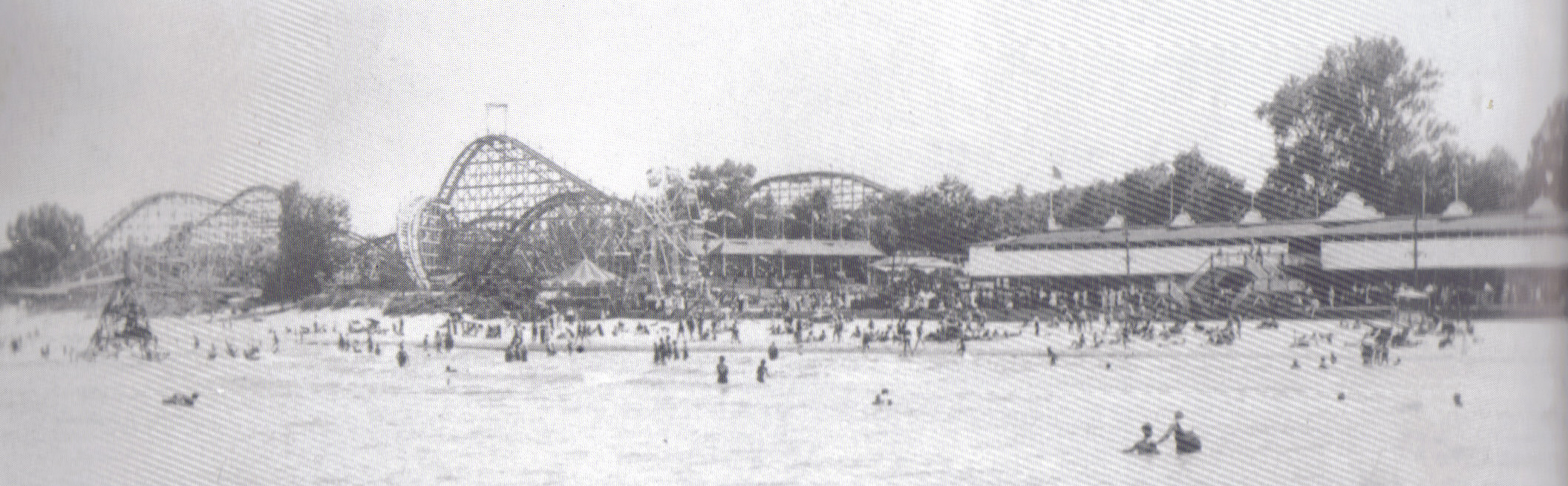
Cedar Point from Lake Erie in the late 1930s. The Cyclone roller coaster is on the far left and the first hill of the High Frolics roller coaster is in the center.

This is a list of rides and attractions which once operated at the Cedar Point amusement park that have since been removed.

== Defunct roller coasters ==
Ride	Picture	Year opened	Year closed	Manufacturer	Description
Broadway Trip		1964	1964	Mack Rides	A steel roller coaster. It operated at another park before it came to Cedar Point, and it operated at six more parks after its time at Cedar Point, before ultimately being dismantled in 2003.
Cyclone		1929	1951	Traver Engineering	A wooden roller coaster
Dip the Dips Scenic Railway		1908	1917	Unknown	A wooden roller coaster with a height of 33 feet (10 m)
Disaster Transport		1985	2012	Intamin	A steel bobsled roller coaster. Formerly known as Avalanche Run before being enclosed in 1989.
High Frolics		1918	1940	Edward Vettel	A wooden roller coaster with a height of 75 feet (23 m). It was built out of the remnants of Dip the Dips Scenic Railway, and was originally named Leap Frog Railway. In 1933, it was renovated and its name was changed to High Frolics.
Jumbo Jet		1972	1978	Schwarzkopf	A steel Jet Star roller coaster. It operated at five other parks after its time at Cedar Point, and is now located at Chelyuskintsev Park in Belarus.
Leap the Dips		1912	1935	T. M. Harton Company, Irwin Vettel	A wooden out-and-back roller coaster
Little Dipper		1952	1952	Allan Herschel Company	A steel children's roller coaster that was a one-year concession. It previously operated at Myrtle Beach Pavilion in South Carolina.
Loop the Loop		1902	1909	Frederick Ingersoll	A wooden roller coaster with a height of 46 feet (14 m). Also known as Three-Way Figure Eight Roller Toboggan.
Mean Streak		1991	2016	Dinn Corporation	A wooden roller coaster. It was the tallest wooden coaster in the world with the longest drop when it opened to the public, standing at 161 feet (49 m). It was converted into Steel Vengeance, a hybrid steel coaster, which opened in 2018
Racer		1910	1928	McKay Construction	A wooden racing roller coaster with a height of 46 feet (14 m)
Scamper		1962	1969	Unknown	A wooden wild mouse roller coaster. It later operated at Dollywood in Pigeon Forge, Tennessee.
Super Coaster		1953	1965-66	Allan Herschell Company	A steel children's roller coaster that previously operated at Myrtle Beach Pavilion. It operated at Vollmar's Park in Bowling Green, Ohio after its time at Cedar Point.
Switchback Railway		1892	1901	Unknown	A wooden roller coaster with a height of 25 feet (7.6 m) and a speed of 10 miles per hour (16 km/h). It was Cedar Point's first roller coaster. It did not have a powered lift hill, so the cars needed to be pulled back to the station by hand.
Top Thrill Dragster		2003	2021	Intamin	A first-of-its-kind full circuit steel hydraulically launched strata coaster (Accelerator Coaster), with a height of 420 feet (130 m) and speed of 120 miles per hour (190 km/h). The attraction was closed in August 2021 due to an incident. The ride was reimagined into Top Thrill 2 in 2024.
Wicked Twister		2002	2021	Intamin	A steel LIM launched inverted roller coaster (Impulse) marketed as the tallest and fastest of its kind in the world when it opened. Replaced by the Grand Pavilion in 2023.
Wild Mouse		1959	1963	B.A. Schiff & Associates	A steel wild mouse roller coaster
Wildcat		1970	1978	Schwarzkopf	A steel roller coaster. It later operated at Valleyfair in Shakopee, Minnesota for a time before being moved to Jolly Roger Amusement Park in Ocean City, Maryland, where it still operates today.
WildCat		1979	2011	Schwarzkopf	A steel roller coaster. Removed in 2011 to make room for Luminosity – Ignite the Night! . It operated in three locations in the park during its tenure. The footprint for WildCat now houses parts of Valravn and Siren's Curse.

== Defunct rides ==
Ride	Picture	Year opened	Year closed	Manufacturer	Description
Airplane Dips		1917	Unknown	Aero Joy-Plane Company	A track ride themed to airplanes that went around a circular track similar to a Tumble Bug
Antique Cars		1969	2021	Arrow Development	An automobile track ride in Frontier Town with cars that resembled an early Cadillac car. After 52 years of operation, it was permanently closed and demolished in November 2021. It was replaced by The Farmhouse Kitchen & Grill in 2022.
Bayern Kurve		1970	1984	Schwarzkopf	A Bayern Kurve ride
Bumper Boats		1993	2013	Hampton Amusement Company	A children's bumper boat ride located in the Gemini's Children Area. It closed in 2013, and was replaced by Lake Erie Eagles.
Caterpillar		1924	1961	Unknown	A Caterpillar ride that generates centrifugal force, causing the riders on the inside of the seats to press against the riders on the outside of the seats
Circle Swing		1906	1920s or 1930s	Unknown	A swing ride that was located at the center of the former amusement circle midway
Chaos		1997	2010	Chance Rides	A Chaos ride that was one of the first of its kind. It inverts its riders in three degrees of motion: lifting, inverting, and spinning. Moved in 2002 to make room for Top Thrill Dragster, and relocated to the former Schwabinchen location. Closed in 2010.
Choo Choo Lagoon		1995	2016	Unknown	A children's area featuring a train-themed water play area. It closed in 2016 and was replaced by Lemmy's Lagoon.
Demon Drop		1983	2009	Intamin	A Freefall ride that provides the feeling of weightlessness. It was relocated to Dorney Park & Wildwater Kingdom in 2010. It was replaced at Cedar Point with Ocean Motion, which was later relocated within the park to make room for WindSeeker.
Dodgem		1967	2001	Unknown	A bumper cars ride located across from Magnum XL-200. It was moved to Michigan's Adventure. A separate Dodgem attraction remains on The Boardwalk.
Earthquake		1965	1984	Arrow Development	A dark ride inspired by the 1906 San Francisco earthquake. This ride formerly operated at Freedomland U.S.A. and was relocated to Cedar Point in 1965. The ride transportation system was provided by Arrow Development.
Flying Coaster		1961	1967 or 1968	John Norman Bartlett and Aeroaffiliates	A ride that went around in a circular track with a steep hill that gave riders the sensation of flying
Flying Skooters		1944	1960	Unknown	A children's ride where riders sat in airplanes and swung back and forth as they went in a circle
Frontier Carousel		1972	1994	Dentzel	A 1921 Dentzel wooden carousel with 50 jumping horses, 12 standing horses, 4 menagerie animals (1 deer, 1 giraffe, 1 lion, 1 tiger), and 2 chariots. It was purchased from Lansing, Michigan and moved to Dorney Park & Wildwater Kingdom in 1995. The carousel building still stands in Frontier Town and is used as a haunted house during HalloWeekends. It is listed on the National Register of Historic Places.
Frontier Lift		1968	1985	Von Roll	A second sky ride which operated separate from the one on the main midway. It ran from the main midway to Frontier Town. The site of the midway station is now the station for Iron Dragon, but the Frontier Town station still stands; restrooms occupy the ground floor, while the second floor is used for employee meetings and storage. A cart from the ride is used for HalloWeekends.
Ferris Wheel		1920s or 1930s	Unknown	Unknown	A small Ferris wheel located next to High Frolics
Fun House		1950s or 1966	1981	Unknown	A three-story walkthrough attraction. This "upside-down house" featured a rocking chair on the ceiling and a labyrinth where the floor was at an angle representing an upside-down attic roof. Replaced with the Kid Arthur's Court play area, which would also eventually be removed. Portions of the attraction are used in the HalloWeekends attraction "The Magical House on Boo Hill".
Giant Sky Wheel		1961	1980	Allan Herschell Company	A double Ferris wheel with two wheels mounted on opposite ends of a giant pivoting arm, allowing one wheel to turn high in the air while the other was being loaded. It was located near the front main entrance.
Hot Rods		1970	2013	Hampton Amusement Company	A children's spinning old-fashioned automobile ride located in Kiddy Kingdom
Mill Race		1963	1993	Arrow Development	A log flume that was located near the main entrance. It had a relatively small footprint, and was the second Arrow Development log flume to open. The final drop on this ride was once sponsored by Nestea and was called the "Nestea Plunge". The ride was retired after the 1993 season to make room for Raptor.
Miniature Merry-Go-Round		1920s or 1930s			A miniature carousel that stood next to Cyclone and High Frolics
Monorail		1959	1965	Ohio Mechanical Handling Company	A monorail with a gasoline-powered engine and five streamlined passenger cars that ran along a three-quarter mile long course suspended nine feet off the ground.
Monster		1970	2025	Eyerly Aircraft Company	Standard Monster ride. Operated on the Gemini Midway.
Moon Rocket		1946	1940s or 1950s	Unknown	Spinning ride that only lasted a few seasons on the midway due to poor business.
Old Timers		1970	2013	Hampton Amusement Company	A children's spinning old-fashioned automobile ride located in Kiddy Kingdom
Octopus		1941	Unknown	—N/a	An Octopus ride that spun on an axis with several individually spinning arms and ride vehicles. Similar to the Monster ride that operated on the Gemini Midway up to 2025.
Paddlewheel Excursions		1961	2011		A boat ride with wise-cracking captains that transported its guests on a relaxing voyage around Cedar Point's lagoons past scenes depicting early rural Americana. After a half century of operation, Paddlewheel Excursions ride closed on Labor Day 2011 to make room for Dinosaurs Alive!. The ride was originally known as Riverboat Cruises, then renamed Western Cruise in 1964. Renamed Paddlewheel Excursions in 1987, when the loading dock was relocated to the Gemini Midway to make way for Iron Dragon (whose station sits on the plot of land that once held the dock of Western Cruise).
Pirate Ride		1966	1996	Arrow Development	A pirate-themed dark ride located near the Blue Streak queuing area. This ride formerly operated at Freedomland U.S.A. and was relocated to Cedar Point in 1966. The building still stands today. The ride transportation system was provided by Arrow Development.
Professor Delbert's Frontier Fling		1996	2024	Ride Entertainment Group	A 152 feet (46 m) dual arch Skycoaster model. Previously operated as RipCord from 1996 to 2016 in the Challenge Park section, near the water park. It was an upcharge attraction.
Rotor		1961	1964	Anglo Rotor Corporation	A Rotor ride. A cylindrical room that spun while the floor dropped, leaving riders pinned to the wall by centrifugal force.
Rotor		1967	1984	Chance Rides	A Rotor ride. A cylindrical room that spun while the floor dropped, leaving riders pinned to the wall by centrifugal force.
Schwabinchen		1970	2002	Mack Rides	A Trabant-style ride. The ride's motion resembled that of a spinning coin. It was removed in 2002 to make room for Chaos's relocation after Top Thrill Dragster was built.
Sea Swing		1904	Unknown	Traver Engineering Company	An early swing ride
Shoot the Rapids		1967	1981		A log flume. The ride closed in 1981 to make room for White Water Landing. It operated where Maverick is located now.
Shoot the Rapids		2010	2015	Intamin	A short-lived log flume that was named after the original Shoot the Rapids. Frequent ride problems and an incident in 2013 led to its closure.
SkyScraper		2008	2015	Gravity Works	A Booster ride. The ride had a duration of two minutes, and rotated its riders at a max speed of 55 miles per hour (89 km/h) at 160 feet (49 m) in the air. The ride was previously located at Dorney Park & Wildwater Kingdom and Valleyfair.
Sky Slide		1968	1991	Unknown	A fun slide located just west of the Main Arcade. Riders would sit on a burlap mat while sliding down. The slide had 15 "lanes" for riders.
Snake River Expedition		2021	2023		A themed riverboat attraction that navigated the route formerly taken by the retired Paddlewheel Excursions
Space Spiral		1965	2012	Von Roll/Willie Buhler's Space Towers Company	A 330-foot (100 m) tall gyro tower that gave riders a 360-degree view of the park. It featured a distinctive two-level cabin, found only on a few early models of the ride. However, the second level wasn't used in the ride's later years. It was imploded and demolished on September 12, 2012.
Speed Slides		1988	2011	Surf Coaster	Two body slides in Soak City (now Cedar Point Shores). Replaced by Riptide Raceway.
Sir Rub-A-Dub's Tubs		1986	2014	Unknown	A small water ride in Kiddy Kingdom. Replaced by Dodgem.
Snake River Falls		1993	2024	Arrow Dynamics	A shoot the chute ride. It opened as the tallest and fastest water ride in the world with a drop of 80 feet (24 m).
Star Voyager		1961	1986	Kasper Klaus	A Satellite Jet in which 20 jet-like vehicles were attached to a rotating arm. As the ride rotated, guests could pull or push the yoke of the vehicle to make the jet rise or descend.
Tiki-Twirl		1970	1984	Mack Rides	A Polynesian-themed Calypso. In 2016, the newer Calypso was renamed "Tiki Twirl" after the 1970 version. In 2023, its name was returned to Calypso.
Trabant		1966	1990	Chance Rides	A Trabant ride in which the riders sat on the ends of a round disc-shaped object similar to a flattened cone. The ride motion pattern resembled that of a spinning coin.
Tumble Bug		1934	1963	Traver Engineering Company	A Tumble Bug ride with a central axis and a circular, humped track
Turnpike Cars		1959	2014	Arrow Dynamics	The ride featured cars themed to mini hot rods from the 1950s and 1960s. Replaced by Valravn.
Twister		1950s	Early 1970s	Unknown	A spinning ride that was originally located where the main midway restaurants are now. In the late 1960s it was moved to where the Grand Pavilion stands today.
VertiGo		2001	2001	S&S Worldwide	An air-powered thrill ride that used three 265-foot (81 m)-tall towers and cable to propel riders over 300 feet (91 m). One of the ride's three towers partially collapsed after its debut season. Park management felt the potential for failure of this ride design outweighed the positive impact made by repairing it, and it was removed prior to the start of the 2002 season. It was located in the Challenge Park section.
Water Toboggan		1890	Early 1900s	Unknown	A slide built into Lake Erie located approximately where WindSeeker stands today
White Water Landing		1982	2005	Arrow Development	A log flume built on the former site of the original Shoot the Rapids. It operated for 23 years before it was retired to make room for Maverick. Its station and queue are now part of Maverick's queue and gift shop.
Witches' Wheel		1977	2018	HUSS Park Attractions	An Enterprise ride that spun riders, eventually inverting them upside down for several rotations more than 60 feet (18 m) above ground. Replaced by BackBeatQue.
Yankee Bullet		1941	Unknown	Unknown	Fast-paced ride with enclosed ride cars
Zugspitze	unknown	1966	1971	Mack Rides	A variation of a standard Himalaya ride
Jaycopter		1964	1964	Jaycopter Corporation	A unique helicopter simulator originally intended for military training. Also operated at the 1964-65 New York World's Fair.

== Defunct attractions ==
Ride	Year opened	Year closed	Description
Aquarium	1967	2001	An aquarium. It was removed to make room for Wicked Twister. Its plot of land is now occupied by the Grand Pavilion, which was built in 2023.
Berenstain Bear Country	1985	1998	A children's play area themed to The Berenstain Bears. It was rethemed to Peanuts Playground in 1999.
Cedar Point Cinema	1975	2001	A 950-seat IMAX cinema featuring a 67 foot by 90 foot screen and an IMAX projection system. The screen was removed in 2001, and the building was renamed the Good Time Theater. After hosting ice skating shows from 2002 to 2014, the theater was removed at the end of the 2014 season to make way for Valravn.
Challenge Park	1992	2016	A small area located near the Soak City water park. It featured Challenge Racing, Skyscraper, Xtreme Trampoline, Ripcord (later known as Professor Delbert's Frontier Fling), the Frontier Trail, and Challenge Golf. Removed to allow for the expansion and rebranding of the water park to Cedar Point Shores.
Dinosaurs Alive!	2012	2018	A walkthrough attraction which featured 50 animatronic dinosaurs. It was removed to make way for Forbidden Frontier on Adventure Island.
Eden Musee	1918	1966	A wax museum that contained the heads of well-known historical and folk figures. It was replaced by the Hollywood wax museum.
Forbidden Frontier on Adventure Island	2019	2022	An island with interactive activities
Jungle Larry's African Safari	1965	1994	A zoological attraction with live animal exhibits, including some trained animal shows. Originally, guests had to cross a long bridge over a lagoon to get to the attraction. When the midway was extended in 1976, this part of the lagoon was filled in.
Kid Arthur's Court	1982	1999	A children's play area with ball pits, a maze, and rope climbing. It was demolished to make way for Peanuts Playground.
Noah's Ark	1925	1959	A wooden replica of Noah's Ark that contained moving animals and had a slight swaying movement to simulate the appearance of a rocking boat.
Peanuts Playground	1999	2007	A children's play area. It was removed to make room for Planet Snoopy.
Rock Climbing Wall	2000	2004	Upcharge rock climbing wall
Snoopy Bounce	1999	2019	Bounce house located in Camp Snoopy
Starlight Experience	2009	2012	Over one million colorful LED lights lit up the Frontier Trail nightly. It also featured music and various Peanuts floats.
Swan Boats	1997	2003	A swan boat-style paddleboat ride. They were relocated to Michigan's Adventure for the 2004 season. The pond used for the Swan Boats is where Maverick's turnaround is located today.

== Former shows ==
Show	Opened	Closed	Location	Description
American Portrait	2011	2011	Millennium Midway	A nighttime show themed to patriotic America. It occurred nightly around 10 p.m., and was shown on the big screen in front of the Cedar Point & Lake Erie Railroad station. It was replaced by Luminosity – Ignite the Night!.
Great Western Band	1884	1884	Grove on lakeshore	
Hot Summer Lights	2006	2010	Millennium Midway	
Luminosity – Ignite the Night!	2012	2017	Celebration Plaza	Luminosity – Ignite the Night! was a nighttime show featuring dancers, singers, drummers, and Cirque du Soleil performers. It was free with admission, and was replaced by another show called Vertical Impact.
Mundy's Trained Wild Animal Show	1908	1966	Unknown	
Splash!	1999	2007	The Aquatic Stadium	A high diving demonstration. It was replaced by the All Wheels Extreme stunt show.
The Summer Spectacular	1995	2005	Millennium Midway	A nighttime laser light show projected on a giant screen in front of the Cedar Point & Lake Erie Railroad train station. It was replaced by Hot Summer Lights.

== Rides relocated within Cedar Point ==
Ride	Year moved	Former location	New location
Atomic Scrambler (formerly Scrambler)	2023	Near Corkscrew	The Boardwalk
Calypso (formerly Tiki Twirl)	2015	Next to Blue Streak	The Boardwalk
Dodgem	2015	Millennium Midway Plaza	The Boardwalk
Giant Wheel	2000	Millennium Force	The Boardwalk
Matterhorn	1985	Near former Space Spiral plot (GateKeeper's location today)	Near Corkscrew
Matterhorn	2023	Near Corkscrew	The Boardwalk
Midway Carousel	1994	Raptor	Near front entrance
Monster	1987	Iron Dragon	Gemini Midway
Ocean Motion	2011	WindSeeker	Former Demon Drop plot (near front entrance)
Professor Delbert's Frontier Fling (formerly RipCord)	2017	Challenge Park (now Cedar Point Shores)	Former 2010 Shoot the Rapids plot (near Forbidden Frontier on Adventure Island)
Rock, Spin, and Turn	2014	Gemini Midway	Kiddy Kingdom
Space Age	2014	Gemini Midway	Kiddy Kingdom
Super Himalaya	1985	Near former Space Spiral plot (GateKeeper's location today)	Camp Snoopy
Super Himalaya	1999	Camp Snoopy	Next to Corkscrew's station
Troika	2001	Near Corkscrew	The Boardwalk
