= GateKeeper (roller coaster) =

Steel wing coaster at Cedar Point

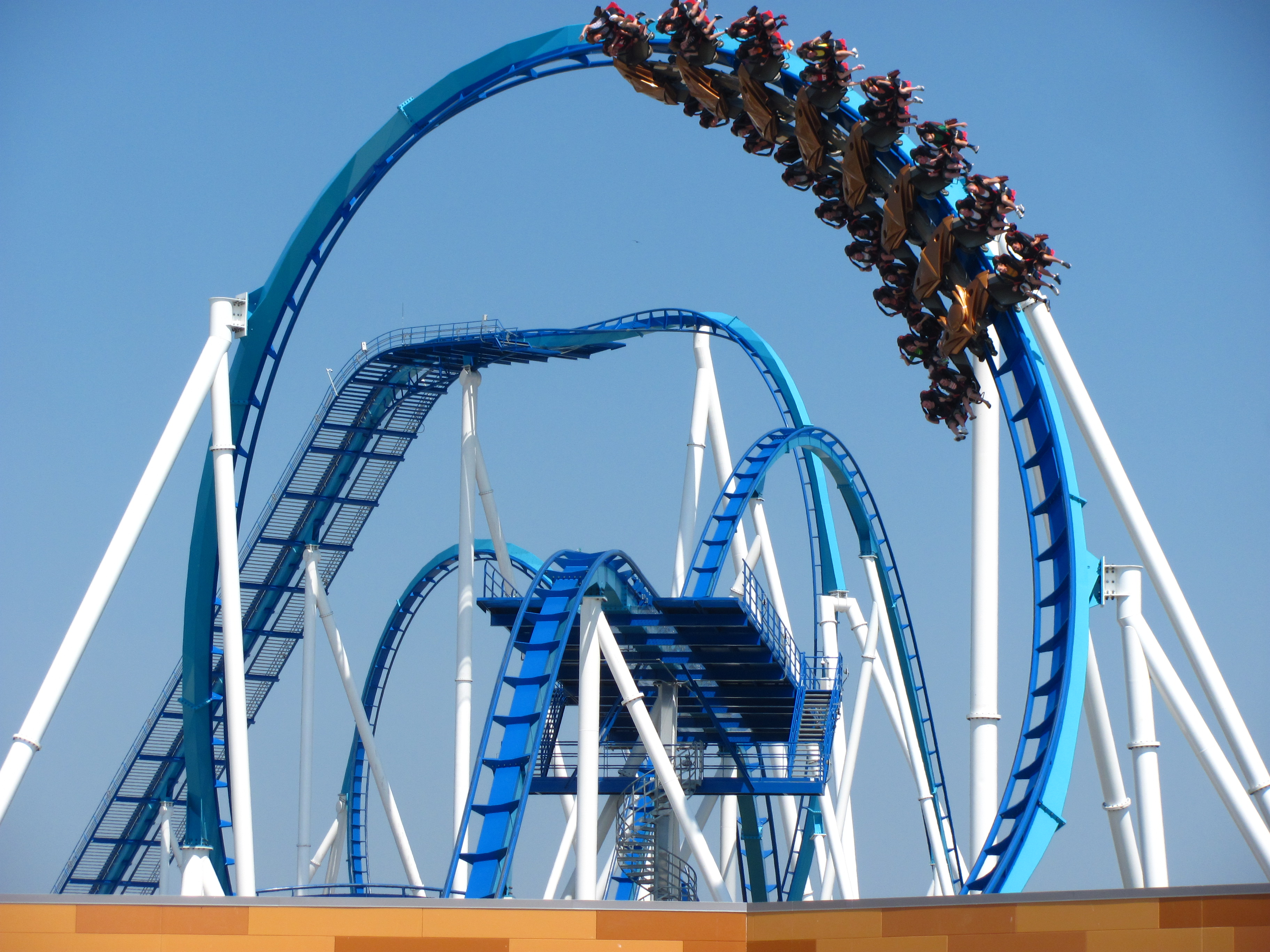
- GateKeeper's flat spin element

Cedar Point
- Location: Cedar Point
- Park section: The Boardwalk
- Coordinates: 41.480582°N 82.679009°W
- Status: Operating
- Soft opening date: May 9, 2013
- Opening date: May 11, 2013
- Cost: $30 million
- Replaced: Disaster Transport; Space Spiral

General statistics
- Type: Steel – Wing Coaster
- Manufacturer: Bolliger & Mabillard
- Model: Wing Coaster
- Track layout: Out and back
- Lift/launch system: Chain lift hill
- Height: 170 ft (52 m)
- Drop: 164 ft (50 m)
- Length: 4,164 ft (1,269 m)
- Speed: 67 mph (108 km/h)
- Inversions: 6
- Duration: 2:00
- Capacity: 1,710 riders per hour
- G-force: 4
- Height restriction: 52–78 in (132–198 cm)
- Trains: 3 trains with 8 cars; riders arranged 4 across in a single row for a total of 32 riders per train
- Fast Lane available
- Wheelchair accessible
- GateKeeper at RCDB

GateKeeper is a steel roller coaster located at Cedar Point amusement park in Sandusky, Ohio. Designed by Bolliger & Mabillard (B&M), it was the fifth Wing Coaster installation in the world. The ride opened on May 11, 2013, on the most successful opening weekend to date in the park's history. GateKeeper featured the highest inversion in the world when it opened, with its 170-foot (52 m) Wing Over drop. It also broke several Wing Coaster records, including those for height, speed, track length, drop height and number of inversions. The coaster has a 170 ft (52 m), 40-degree inclined lift hill with a 164 ft (50 m) drop and features two support towers with keyhole elements that the trains travel through.

Construction began in September 2012 and took roughly eight months to complete. Cedar Point built a new entrance plaza featuring the keyhole towers as the centerpiece. The roller coaster replaced Disaster Transport and Space Spiral, both demolished during mid-2012. It was Cedar Point's first new roller coaster since Maverick debuted in 2007, and the third B&M coaster in the park following Raptor (1994) and Mantis (1996). In 2013, GateKeeper was the most frequently-ridden roller coaster at Cedar Point, and it ranked 28th among steel roller coasters in the annual Golden Ticket Awards poll from Amusement Today.

== History ==
=== Planning ===
Initial planning for a new roller coaster began under former Cedar Fair CEO Dick Kinzel in 2011, who credits his successor Matt Ouimet with the project. The first concept of GateKeeper was showcased at the 2011 International Association of Amusement Parks and Attractions (IAAPA) Expo. On April 24, 2012, Ouimet said at an Erie County Chamber of Commerce meeting that there would be $25 million in capital expenditures for Cedar Point in 2013. On May 30, 2012, the Sandusky Register reported that a memo written by Ouimet to Cedar Fair's board of directors on February 15, 2012, stated that a new Wing Coaster code-named "CP Alt. Winged" would be introduced in 2013. It also mentioned that the new coaster would set Wing Coaster records for drop, speed, and length and that it would have a "Front Gate Statement" explained as a strong presence at the entrance to the park. In addition to traveling over the front entrance, part of the track would also cross over portions of the parking lot. Details claimed the ride would be 170 feet (52 m) high, and that both Disaster Transport and Space Spiral would need to be removed to accommodate the new attraction.

As part of GateKeeper's marketing campaign, Cedar Point released several teasers on their "OnPoint" blog. Posters scattered throughout the park and on Cedar Point's website included taglines such as, "How do you recover from a Disaster?", "WildCat is no match for this creature" and "Not even a Jumbo Jet soars like this!" Each poster had a black background with five blue wings, hinting at the ride's logo. Annie Zelm, a marketing representative for the park, stated that some of the clues on the website were intended to mislead readers. On August 3, 2012, Cedar Point launched a countdown clock on their Facebook page, letting the public know when the next major announcement was scheduled. The page said, "We can't keep it locked away much longer... Join us outside the Main Gate at 3:30 pm on August 13, where all we've kept hidden will be set free!"

On August 13, 2012, Cedar Point made an official announcement introducing GateKeeper with specifications that confirmed the report leaked previously by Sandusky Register—a 170-foot-tall (52 m) Wing Coaster that would be manufactured by B&M. The announcement included a Halloween Haunt-like creature speaking to guests atop the main gate at the park's main entrance. A trademark application was filed for the name GateKeeper the same day. Rob Decker said, "GateKeeper is truly an innovation in thrills. Every twist, turn and near-miss element was created exclusively for Cedar Point." Following its completion, the total investment in the new coaster was $30 million.

=== Construction and opening ===
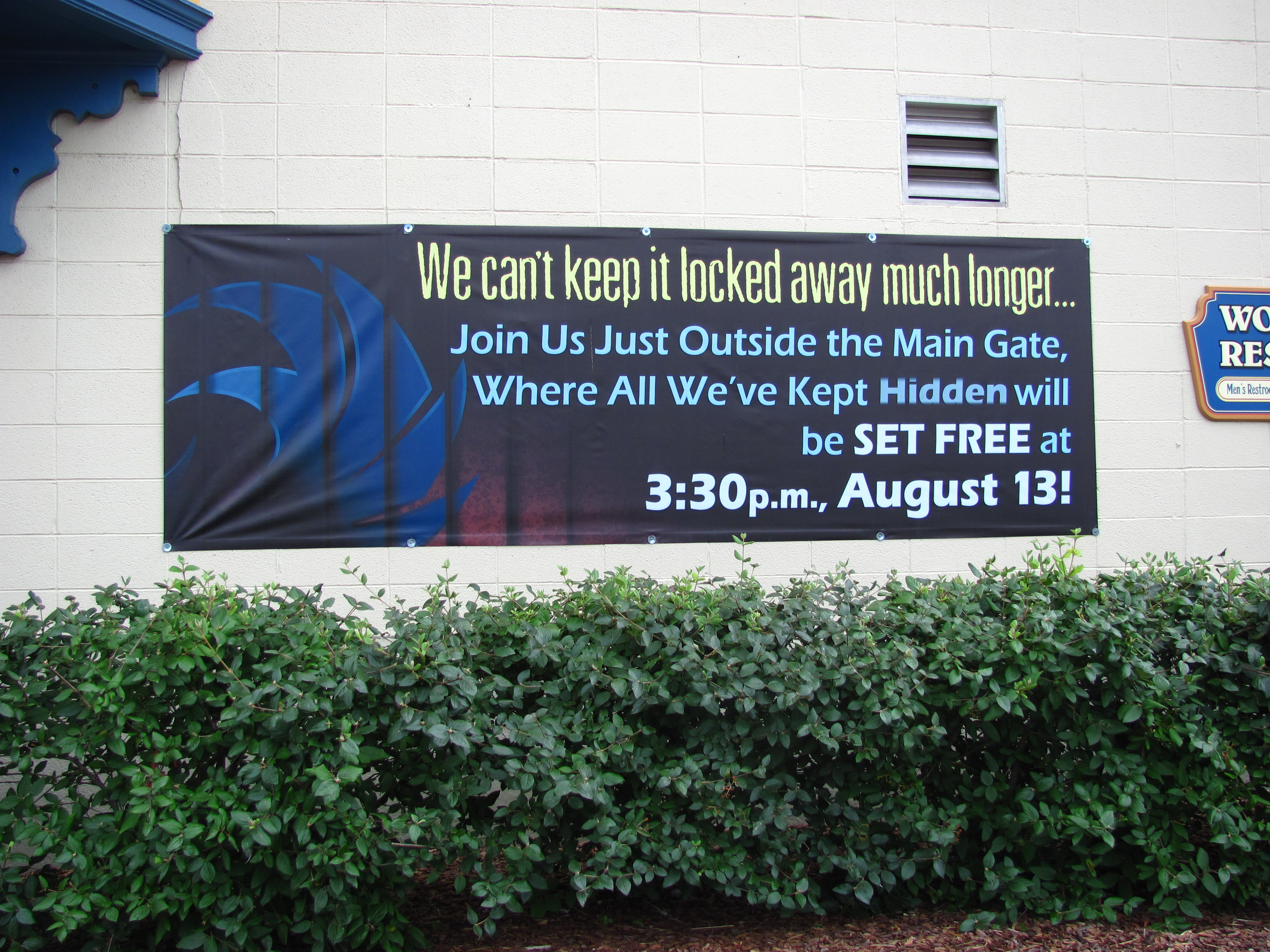
Banner announcing the August 13, 2012, reveal date for GateKeeper

Cedar Point announced in early July 2012 that the Disaster Transport and Space Spiral attractions were scheduled for removal. Disaster Transport closed on July 29, 2012, with dismantling beginning a week later in the back of the building. Space Spiral closed on August 14, 2012, and was demolished a month later by a controlled explosion that imploded the base and caused the tower to fall toward the beach. Construction of GateKeeper started in mid-September and the first footings were poured on October 2. Approximately 200 footings were dug, each approximately 6 feet (1.8 m) deep. The first pieces of track were delivered on October 23 and the installation of the track and supports, starting with the station, began on November 5. The lift hill was topped off on November 30. A construction update on January 7, 2013, said that approximately 40% of the ride's structure, including the Wing Over Drop, Immelmann and Camelback elements, had been completed. The first pieces of the two keyhole towers arrived on January 23, and the first keyhole tower was erected on January 29. On February 27, 2013, at approximately 2 pm, the final piece of GateKeeper was put in place about two weeks ahead of schedule.

Gatekeeper took approximately eight months to construct, and nearly 100 workers from four engineering companies participated on the project. Sherrod Brown, a United States senator from Ohio, praised Cedar Point for hiring local companies for the job. A.A. Boos & Sons did the groundwork, including the footers and cement pouring. Tony Ravagnani Architects designed, engineered and installed the two keyhole towers. The electrical work, including the lighting, was done by Firelands Electric. The station and gift shop were built by Bert Witte Contractors, S.A. Comunal installed the plumbing and air systems and Lew’s Construction built the park's new entrance plaza. About 12 million pounds (5,400,000 kilograms) of concrete was used for the ride.

Hundreds of tests were conducted prior to inspection and operational approval. The roller coaster completed its first full-circuit ride during testing on April 4, 2013. Less than a week later, Cedar Point hosted an online auction for the first 64 seats on GateKeeper's opening day. The Cleveland Clinic Children's Hospital and United Way of Erie County each had 32 seats available in separate auctions, and proceeds were shared between the organizations. A soft opening media day for GateKeeper was held on May 9, 2013, and the ride opened to the public two days later on May 11.

== Ride experience ==
=== Entrance and queue ===
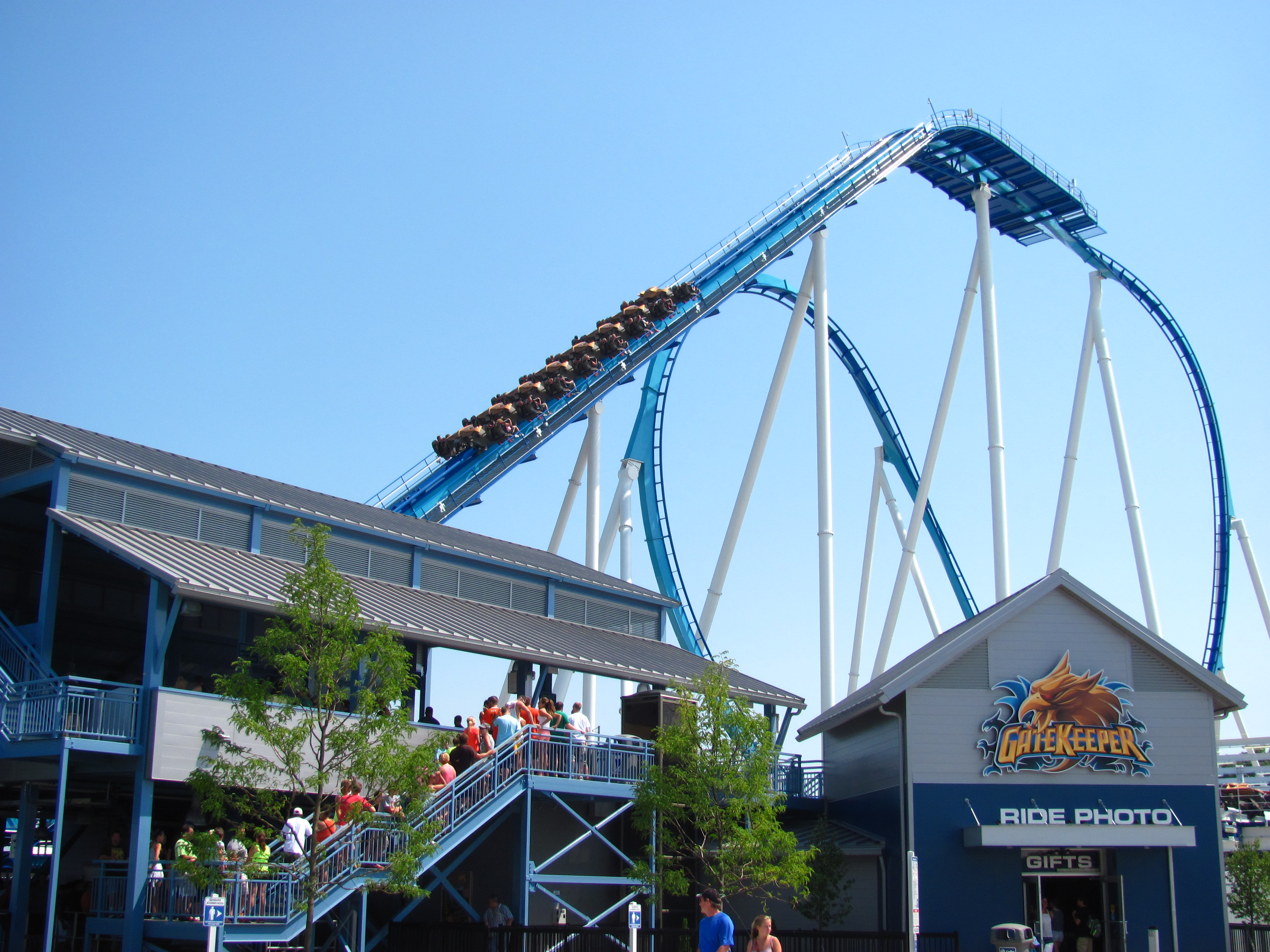
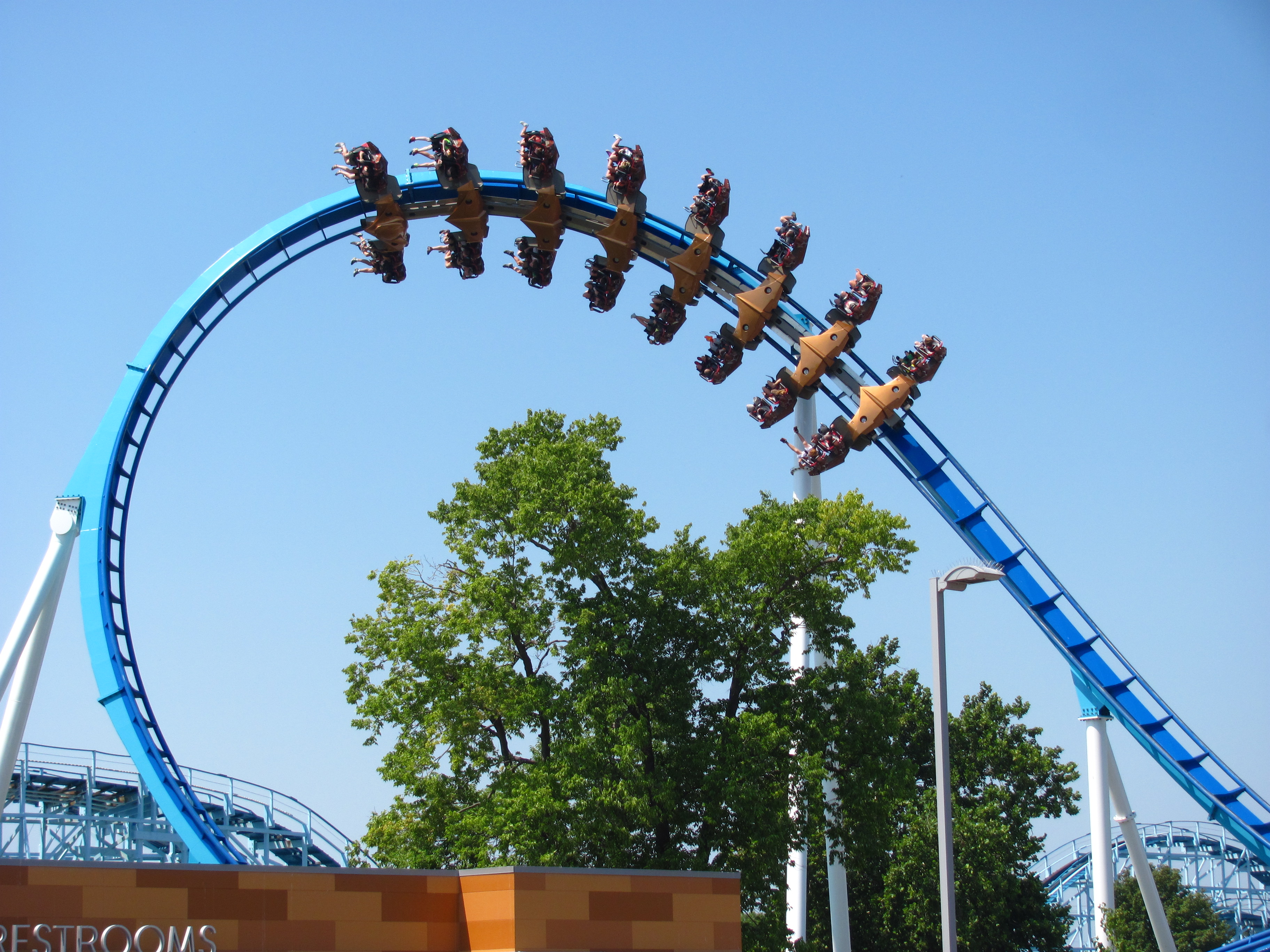
GateKeeper's station, gift shop and lift hill (left), and train going through the inclined dive loop element (right)

GateKeeper's entrance plaza is located along the beach near Giant Wheel. A sculpture with the GateKeeper logo is in the center of the plaza. The queue runs parallel to the beach, under the lift hill and station. Once under the station, riders can choose which side of the train they would like to ride. GateKeeper uses the Fast Lane queuing system; visitors can buy a wristband that allows them to wait in a shorter line.

=== Layout ===
After leaving the station, the train turns a big 180 degrees to the right and begins to climb the chain lift hill at a 40-degree angle. At the top of the 170-foot (52 m) lift, it immediately enters the first element, an inversion that B&M calls the "Wing Over Drop". The train rotates 180 degrees before descending 164 feet (50 m) in a half loop. During this drop, the ride attains its maximum speed of 67 mph (108 km/h), and riders experience approximately 4 Gs. After exiting the first drop, the train enters an Immelmann loop situated underneath the lift hill. After the loop, the train turns right into its only camelback hill, where riders experience a feeling of weightlessness. Next, the train goes through an oversized corkscrew element that B&M calls a giant flat spin, followed by two keyhole elements slotted through a pair of 100-foot-tall (30 m) towers near the park's entrance. Both keyholes are connected by a zero-g roll inversion. The train then dips low to the ground and enters an inclined dive loop, where the track reaches its turnaround point. Next, the train rotates 360 degrees in an inline twist and passes by the two keyhole towers. The track veers slightly left as the train enters the mid-course brake run. This is followed by another hill that dips low to the ground and a 360-degree downward helix. The train then traverses a small hill before turning left into the final brake run, which leads back into the station.

== Characteristics ==
=== Location ===
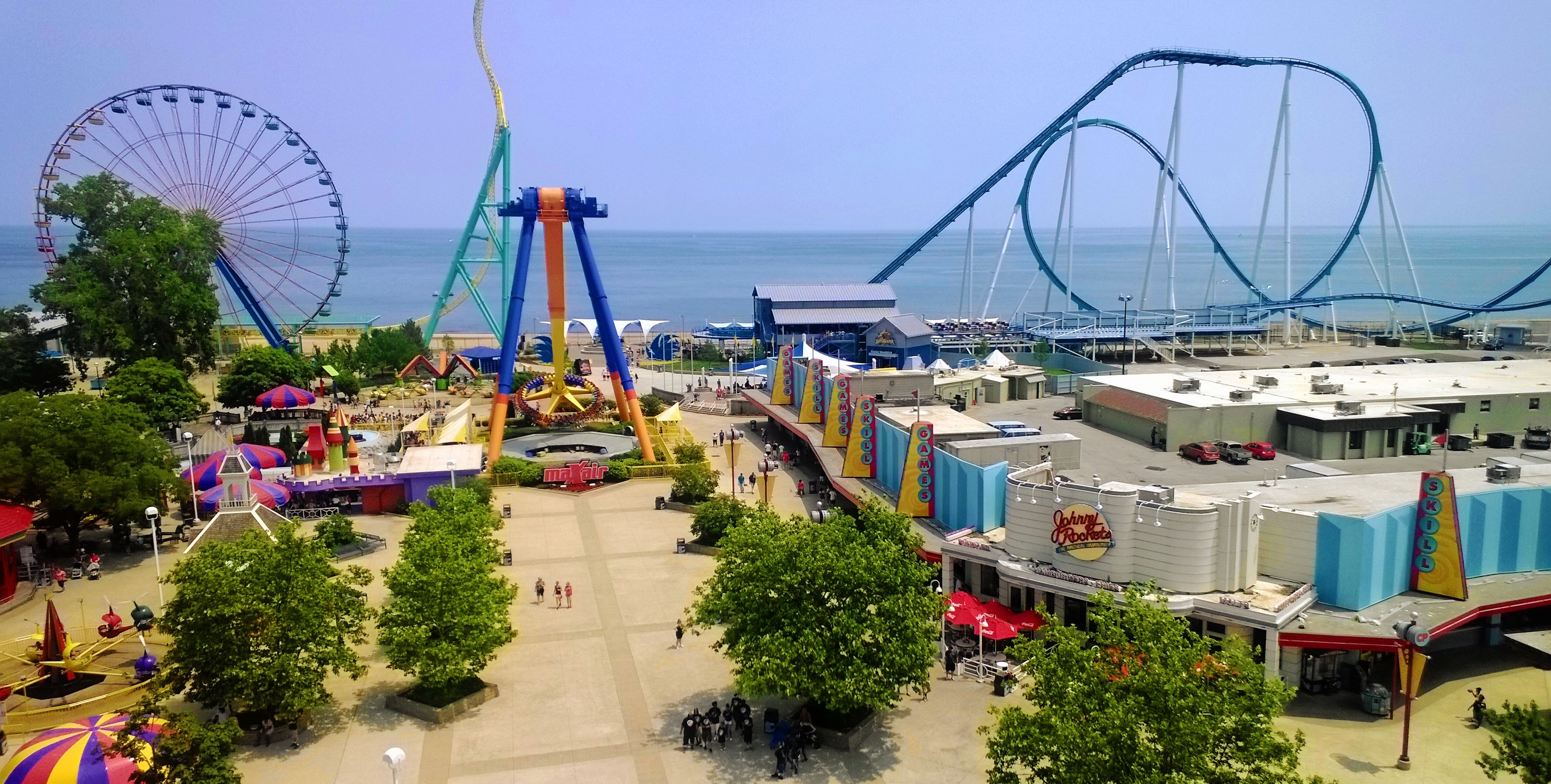
GateKeeper (right) viewed from the Sky Ride

GateKeeper's entrance and station are located near Giant Wheel, Troika and maXair. The ride covers 3.5 acres (1.4 ha); it initially runs parallel to Lake Erie then travels through the parking lot, over the main entrance then turns around in front of Blue Streak. As it passes through the main entrance plaza, it passes through two 100-foot (30 m)-tall towers that form Cedar Point's entrance gates.

=== Manufacturer ===
GateKeeper is a Wing Coaster model manufactured by Swiss roller coaster firm Bolliger & Mabillard. It is the third roller coaster at Cedar Point to be manufactured by B&M, after Raptor, an inverted roller coaster, and Rougarou, a floorless roller coaster. GateKeeper was the third Wing Coaster in the United States, following X-Flight at Six Flags Great America and Wild Eagle at Dollywood. This was also the fifth one to be built worldwide, after the two in the U.S., as well as Raptor at Gardaland in Italy and The Swarm at Thorpe Park in the United Kingdom.

=== Trains ===
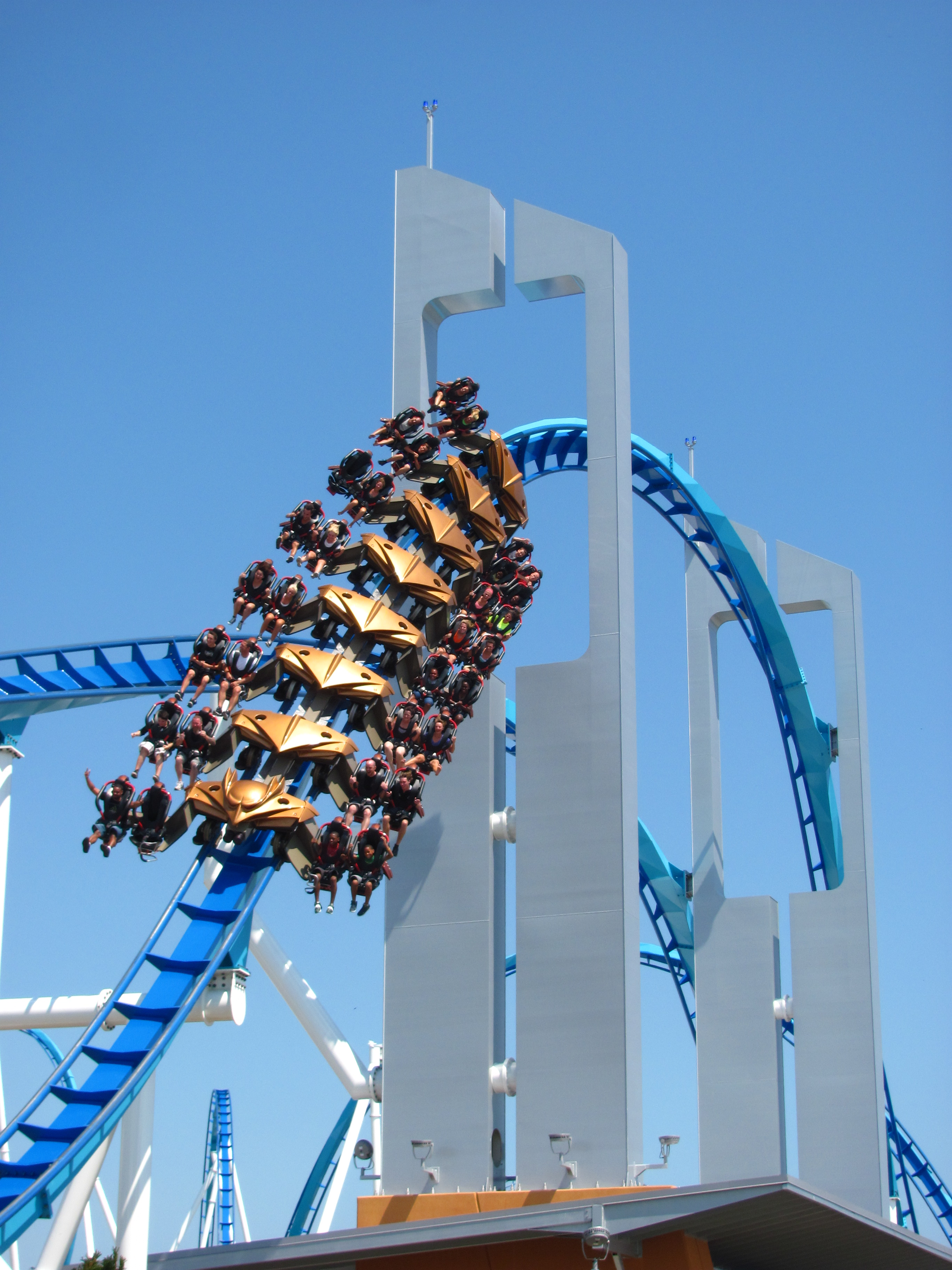
One of GateKeeper's trains exiting the Keyhole element

GateKeeper operates with three open-air steel and fiberglass trains, each with eight cars of four seats each, with two on each side of the track. Each train holds 32 riders and the ride has a capacity of about 1,710 riders per hour. Riders are restrained by flexible over-the-shoulder restraints and interlocking seat belts and riders are required to be between 52 inches (130 cm) and 78 inches (200 cm) to ride. Because the seats are on the side of the track, a cantilevered steel arm is used to support the wings. The trains are painted Sunset Gold with Zenith, Meteor, and Orion Gold accents. The fourth row of each train has extendable harnesses enabling large passengers to ride. The front of each train is shaped to resemble the head of a griffin. The griffin's eyes and the outside seats of each row incorporate LED lighting, a first for a roller coaster at Cedar Point. The LED lights on the trains recharge while the trains are in the station.

=== Track ===
GateKeeper's tubular steel track is 4,164 feet (1,269 m) long and the lift is approximately 170 feet (52 m) high. The track is Azure Blue (dark blue) and Strata Blue (light blue), and the supports are white. There are 102 track pieces, each weighing approximately 7,500 pounds (3,400 kg). Unlike Raptor and Rougarou, the track and supports are filled with sand to reduce the noise as the ride traverses the main entrance. The track and supports were manufactured by Clermont Steel Fabricators in Batavia in southwest Ohio.

Clermont also manufactured the two keyhole towers. Each tower is 100 feet (30 m) tall; 25 feet (7.6 m) is the concrete foundation and 75 feet (23 m) is steel. At the Great Ohio Coaster Club holiday tour, Ed Dangler—Cedar Point’s Director of Maintenance and New Construction—stated the original plan was to have the towers' supports encased by an outer shell; however, Cedar Point went back to B&M, and decided to build a steel structure to serve as the keyhole element and the supports. Each half of the tower weighs about 65,000 pounds (29,000 kg).

== Records ==
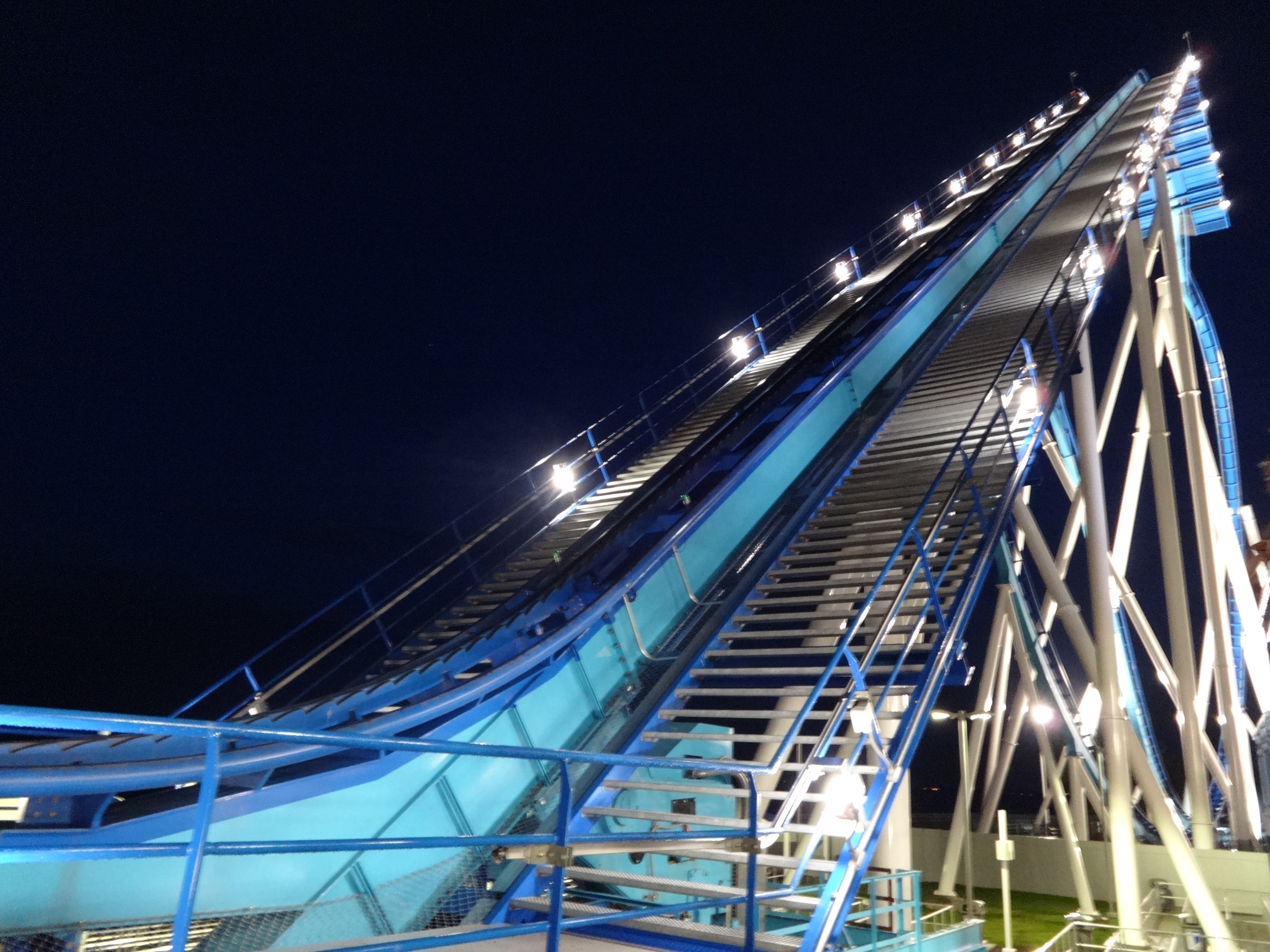
The 170-foot (52 m) lift hill of GateKeeper, lit up at night

GateKeeper broke several world records. Among Wing Coasters, it became the longest and fastest, featured the longest drop, and contained the most inversions. It also set a record for the world's highest roller coaster inversion, surpassing the defunct Volcano, The Blast Coaster at Cedar Point's sister park, Kings Dominion. The highest-inversion record was broken by Steel Curtain in 2019.

== Reception ==
GateKeeper has received mostly positive reviews from the media and public. Some riders complained about the shoulder restraints becoming too tight while sitting in the brake run at the end of the ride. Others praised the near-miss elements; one woman said, "It feels like you're going to get your knees chopped off and your head chopped off." Many guests also praised the smoothness of the ride and how the renovated main entrance is very appealing. On GateKeeper's opening weekend, Cedar Point achieved its most successful opening weekend in the history of the park, due to the popularity of GateKeeper.

On July 17, 2013, GateKeeper's millionth rider received $500 to spend at the park, a VIP tour of the park and exclusive access to GateKeeper for the rest of the 2013 season. The park's spokesman Bryan Edwards said, "We are giving approximately 1,600 rides per hour. It has definitely been a huge success for the park. Our guests love GateKeeper." It finished the season with just over 2.1 million riders, the most of any ride in 2013. GateKeeper also helped Cedar Fair to achieve record revenue, record attendance, record distribution and record stock pricing in 2013.

=== Awards ===
In 2013, GateKeeper ranked third in Amusement Today's Golden Ticket Award for Best New Ride behind Outlaw Run at Silver Dollar City and Iron Rattler at Six Flags Fiesta Texas. It also debuted 28th on the list for Top Steel Roller Coasters, making it the first time ever that Cedar Point had six steel roller coasters in the top 50.

Golden Ticket Awards: Top steel Roller Coasters
Year									1998	1999
Ranking									–	–
Year	2000	2001	2002	2003	2004	2005	2006	2007	2008	2009
Ranking	–	–	–	–	–	–	–	–	–	–
Year	2010	2011	2012	2013	2014	2015	2016	2017	2018	2019
Ranking	–	–	–	28	32	–	49	–	–	–
Year	2020	2021	2022	2023	2024	2025	2026			
Ranking	N/A	–	–	–	–	–	–			

== Incidents ==
- On July 13, 2013, a man was found unresponsive after one of the trains returned to the station. EMT's performed CPR, then rushed him to a nearby hospital. A park spokesman said the man survived a medical condition unrelated to the ride, which reopened later that day.
- On June 12, 2019, strong winds affected the momentum of a train, which stalled and failed to return to the station. Safety mechanisms engaged, stopping the next train on the lift hill. All riders were safely evacuated.

== See also ==
- 2013 in amusement parks

Preceded by Volcano, The Blast Coaster	World's tallest roller coaster inversion May 2013–June 2019	Succeeded by Steel Curtain
