= Scamper =

Scamper may refer to:

- Scamper (horse), a ProRodeo Hall of Fame barrel racing horse
- Scamper (Transformers), a fictional character and the partner of Metroplex in the Transformers universe
- Scamper the Penguin, the namesake of American version of The Adventures of Lolo the Penguin
- Scamper, a former Cedar Point attraction in Sandusky, Ohio
- S.C.A.M.P.E.R, a creativity technique for brainstorming
