= Disaster Transport =

Defunct roller coaster at Cedar Point

- Previously known as Avalanche Run (1985–1989)
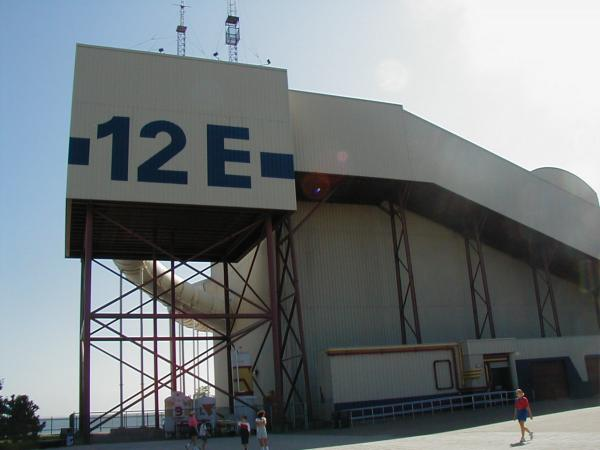
- The outside of Disaster Transport

Cedar Point
- Location: Cedar Point
- Coordinates: 41°28′52″N 82°40′46.00″W
- Status: Removed
- Opening date: 1985
- Closing date: July 29, 2012
- Cost: $3.4 million USD to build (1985) $4 million USD to renovate (1990)
- Replaced by: GateKeeper

General statistics
- Type: Steel – Enclosed – Bobsled
- Manufacturer: Intamin
- Model: Swiss Bob
- Track layout: Custom
- Lift/launch system: Chain
- Height: 63 ft (19 m)
- Drop: 50 ft (15 m)
- Length: 1,932 ft (589 m)
- Speed: 40 mph (64 km/h)
- Inversions: 0
- Duration: 2:32
- Max vertical angle: 27°
- Capacity: 1,800 riders per hour
- G-force: 2.7
- Height restriction: 46 in (117 cm)
- Trains: 5 trains with a single car; riders arranged 2 across in 5 rows for a total of 10 riders per train
- Disaster Transport at RCDB

Disaster Transport (originally Avalanche Run) was an enclosed steel bobsled roller coaster built by Intamin at Cedar Point in Sandusky, Ohio, United States. It was notable as being the only indoor roller coaster at Cedar Point, the only bobsled roller coaster in the Midwestern United States, and the only enclosed bobsled roller coaster in the world at its debut. The name of the ride stems from a rearrangement of the letters "Dispatch Master Transport", which could still be seen in the ride's logo in its later years. Before the ride was enclosed, the supports and outer sides of the track were painted blue.

The ride originally opened in 1985 as Avalanche Run, an outdoor attraction. As part of a $4 million renovation, ITEC Productions converted it into a space-themed, indoor roller coaster between 1989 and 1990. The renovated ride's narrative centered on delivering cargo from a suborbital factory to a station in Alaska. The 10-passenger bobsleds traveled through a track with a 63-foot-tall (19 m) lift hill and a 50-foot (15 m) drop, reaching a top speed of 40 mph (64 km/h) with an average ride duration of approximately 2 minutes and 32 seconds. The building itself was also used as a storage facility for the park, and the structure leaked, forcing the ride to close during rain. The ride closed on July 29, 2012, and the area was cleared to make way for the GateKeeper roller coaster.

== History ==
Disaster Transport was originally known as Avalanche Run and was entirely outdoors. On October 19, 1984, Cedar Point announced that Avalanche Run would be added to the park. The ride opened in 1985. It was built next to the beach, on the former spot of Jumbo Jet and later, WildCat. Many other rides also had to be relocated. The original ride cost $3.4 million: $1.9 million to manufacture and $1.5 million to install.

=== Renovation ===
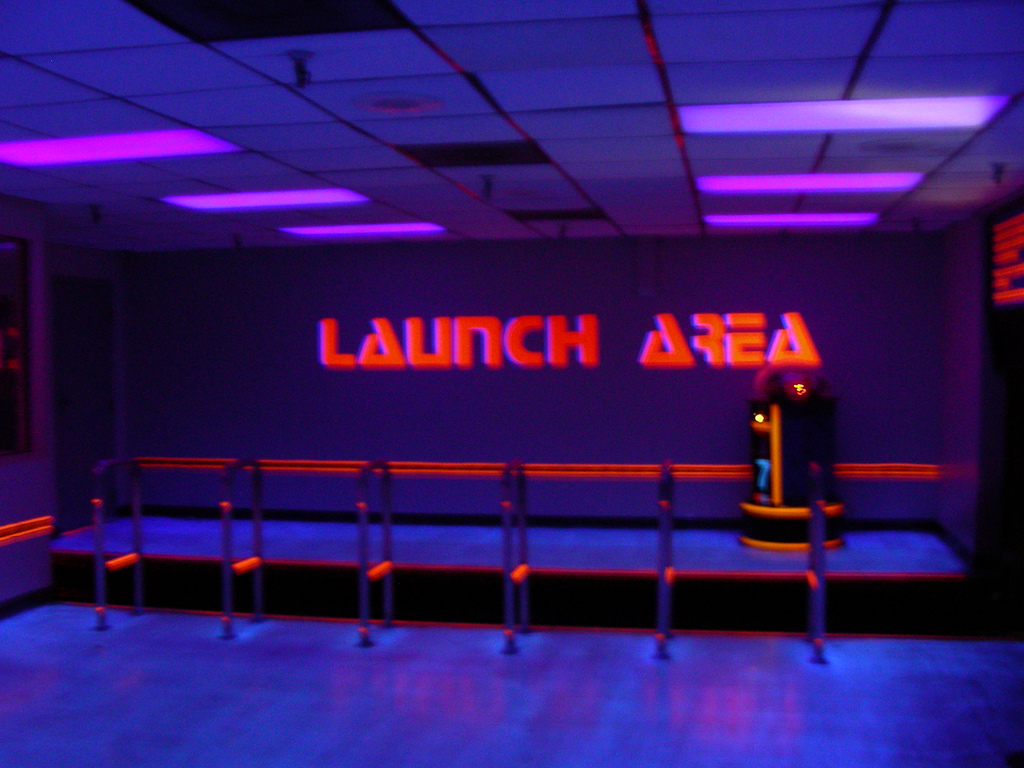
The loading platform of Disaster Transport

In October 1989, Cedar Point announced that Avalanche Run would receive a major refurbishment and be renamed Disaster Transport for the 1990 season. ITEC Productions, Inc. was chosen to renovate the ride, completely enclosing it in a show building. The renovation included the addition of a space-themed queue and ride along with special effect lighting, two robot animatronics, and sound. The special effects and construction cost approximately $4 million. On the outside of the building, "12 E" was written, which had caused numerous rumors as to its meanings. On August 3, 2005, it was revealed that it stood for the 12th ride designed by the ITEC employee, Eric.

Not long after the changes to the ride in 1990, the special effects began to deteriorate due to a lack of upkeep. By the time the ride closed, many of the effects were no longer active or had been covered up. Blacklight reactant paint lined the walls, mostly in the form of handprints or outlines of scenes. These gave a 3-D appearance when the rider wore special glasses purchased at the beginning of the queue.

=== Closure ===
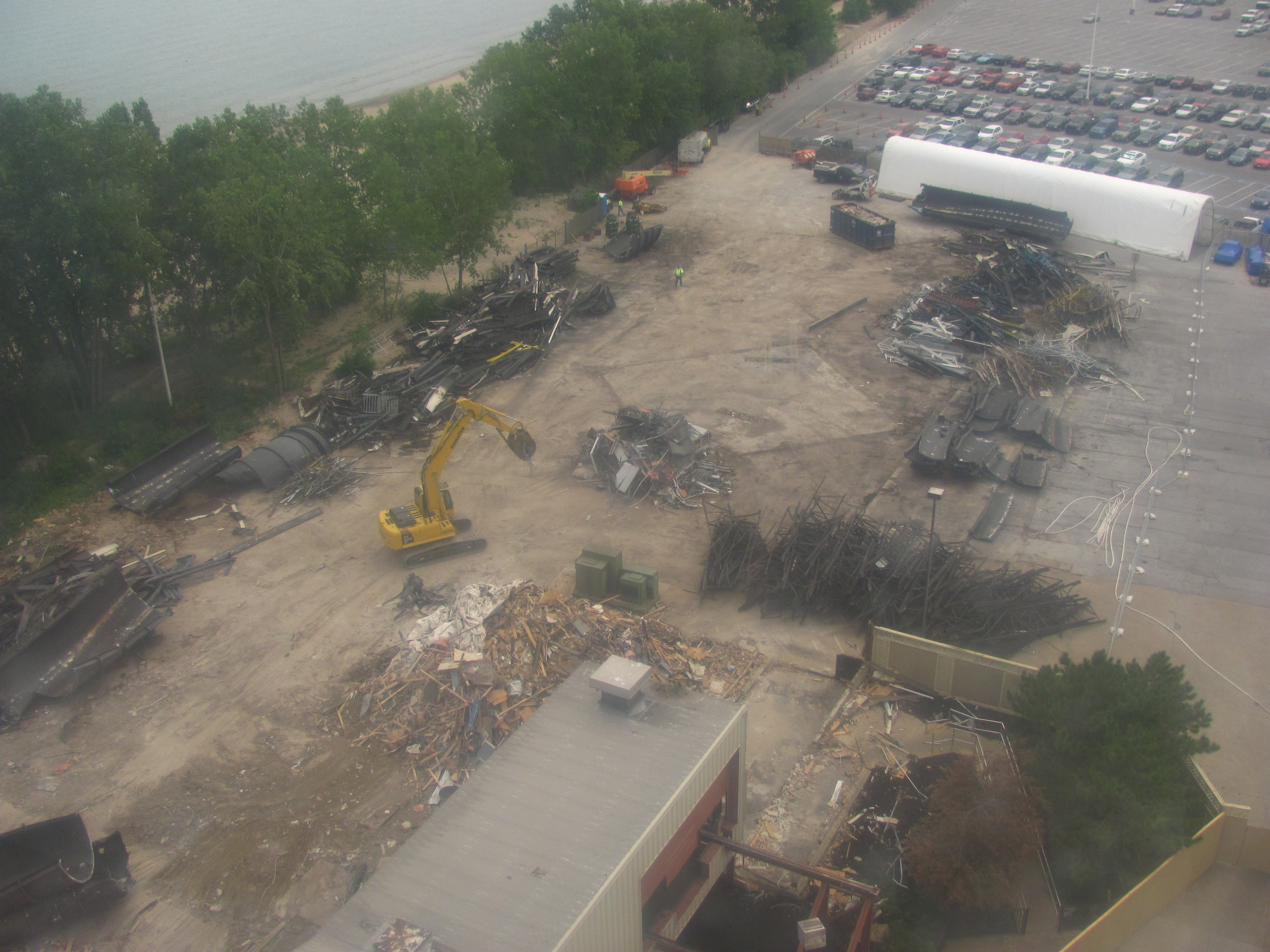
Demolition of Disaster Transport

After Matt Ouimet replaced Richard Kinzel as the CEO of Cedar Fair in 2012, he decided that Disaster Transport could no longer be salvaged. The ride was becoming an outdated attraction, as well as an eyesore. On July 13, 2012, Cedar Point announced that Disaster Transport would close on July 29, 2012. It was the second roller coaster at Cedar Point to close in 2012. A charity auction was held for the final riders, benefiting the Give Kids the World charity foundation. The last ride was given at 11:53 PM on July 29, with the lights turned on.

The ride started demolition on August 6, using about 380 trucks to transport scrap materials. A portion of track, two cars and the main entrance sign were to be donated to the National Roller Coaster Museum. Less than a month later on August 29, the last section of Disaster Transport was demolished. The 12E part of the building was the last section left standing. The following year, GateKeeper immediately replaced both Disaster Transport and its neighbor Space Spiral.

=== Incident ===
On June 7, 1990, a bobsled car carrying eight passengers struck a large plastic foam prop that had fallen from its bracket and onto the track, injuring three riders. The meteorite prop, which was 6 feet (1.8 m) in diameter, weighed 100 to 150 pounds (45 to 68 kg). Two of the injured were treated and released at a nearby hospital, while the third was flown to a Michigan hospital to be treated for a neck injury.

== Ride experience ==
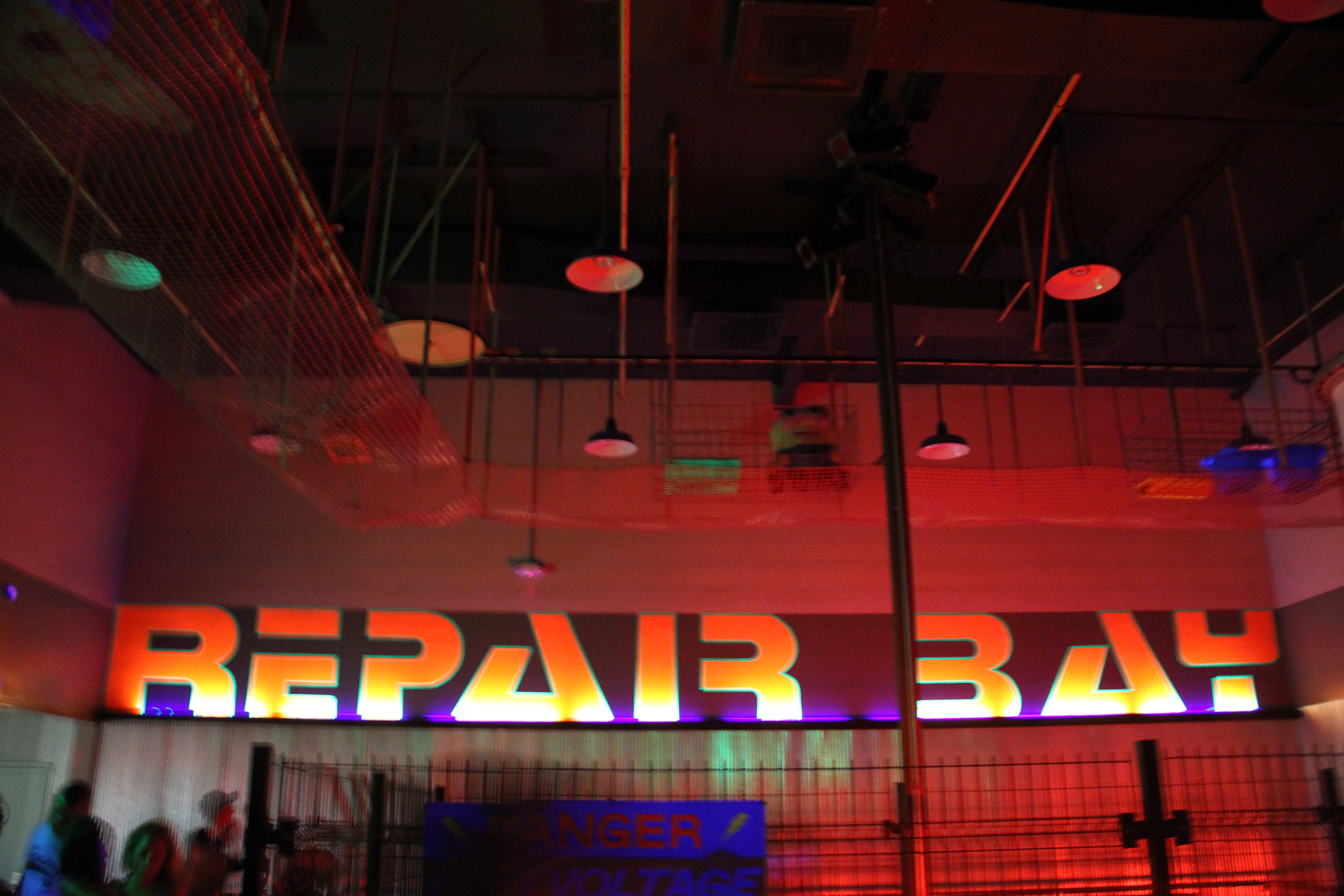
Inside the Repair Bay

Disaster Transport was a bobsled roller coaster, meaning the wheels were not attached to a track as on a conventional roller coaster. The cars — resembling bobsleds — operated within a steel trough, on which they were allowed to operate freely. This allowed the ride to swing from side to side when turning sharp corners, as an actual bobsled would. Guests would enter 10-passenger bobsleds, secured by a lap bar. After leaving the "launch area", the bobsled traveled up the 63-foot-tall (19 m) lift hill at a 15-degree-angle, which featured red and blue blinking lights on the sides. After reaching the top of the lift hill, it curved to the right, dropping 50 feet (15 m) at a 27-degree-angle and reaching a top speed of 40 mph (64 km/h). After that, it curved to the left into a mid course brake run. After the mid course brake run, the bobsled turned left followed by several banked turns and curves and two more brake runs. One cycle of the ride lasted about 2 minutes and 32 seconds. The ride was spread across six structures.

=== Theme ===
After the ride was renovated in 1990, a new space theme was given. The story of the ride was the passengers had been enlisted to deliver cargo from a suborbital factory to a station in Alaska. Large screen projections, simulated lasers, mist, and recordings were added to the ride. In the queue, guests would go through three rooms including Rocket Recovery, Mission Control and Repair Bay. The original entrance to the ride was located next to Troika. During HalloWeekends, the park would change the entrance of Disaster Transport to under the lift hill, leaving the one next to Troika to be used for the Halloween Haunt. For the 2009 season, the entrance was permanently changed to under the lift hill. When the entrance was changed, the Rocket Recovery and Mission Control rooms were closed, leaving the Repair Bay the only room guests walked through.

=== Story ===
The ride experience was different and much more immersive in its earlier years. The story of the ride was that the riders were Dispatch Master Transport's first public passengers and they were bound for a receiving station in Alaska. The alleged company had exclusively transported cargo until that time. The riders' shuttle would also be carrying cargo that included a highly volatile fuel nicknamed "Really Big Bang" (RBB-11 for short).

Within the queue area, passengers walked through multiple rooms with props, special effects, and two robots named Dave and Franc. The queue area was divided into three rooms. The Terminal featured black lights, travel posters, space transport diagrams, and a fabricated mishap (smoke pouring out from under loading gates) that would force riders to head through a detour. The Control Room hosted Dave, who provided mission briefings and comic relief while frequently glitching out, saying "Disaster Transport" instead of "Dispatch Master Transport". The last room was the Repair Bay, which contained Franc, as well as props including suspended conveyor baskets carrying spare rocket parts, a forklift, and a laser scanner.

Alternate view of the building (2002)

From the Repair Bay, guests would climb a short stairway and enter the launch area. The ride vehicles would move from behind a curtain without passengers. The ride would begin after ten or less riders were loaded onto a rocket. The rocket would move out onto a block section where an on-board computer system would welcome the riders. Once the cargo was "loaded" onto the rocket, the launch sequence would begin. Two spinning laser light spheres would project a star field around the rocket as it climbed the lift. Nearing the top, the computer would announce to the riders that they had achieved orbit. But upon reaching the top of the hill, the computer would detect aggressive "space pirates" near their location and began to take evasive maneuvers as the rocket descended down the first drop.

The ride's show building contained numerous props and scenes to make the riders feel as if they were under attack while flying through outer space. The riders would speed by other rockets similar to theirs, explosions, meteors, debris, video projections and a satellite that would fire lasers at the passengers. Halfway through the ride, the on-board computer would shout, "I'm losing control, I'm losing control!" before an Alaskan landscape came into view. Here, the computer would scream, "Look out! We're gonna crash!" The rocket then banked right and entered the final brake run. White lights would strobe accompanied by a gust of wind to simulate the rocket crashing into snow. Riders would enter the unloading station where they were greeted by an employee that yelled, "WELCOME TO ALASKA!" The riders would disembark their vehicle and exit on the left side of the platform where a sign read, "Thank you for flying with Dispatch Master Transport!".

== Building ==
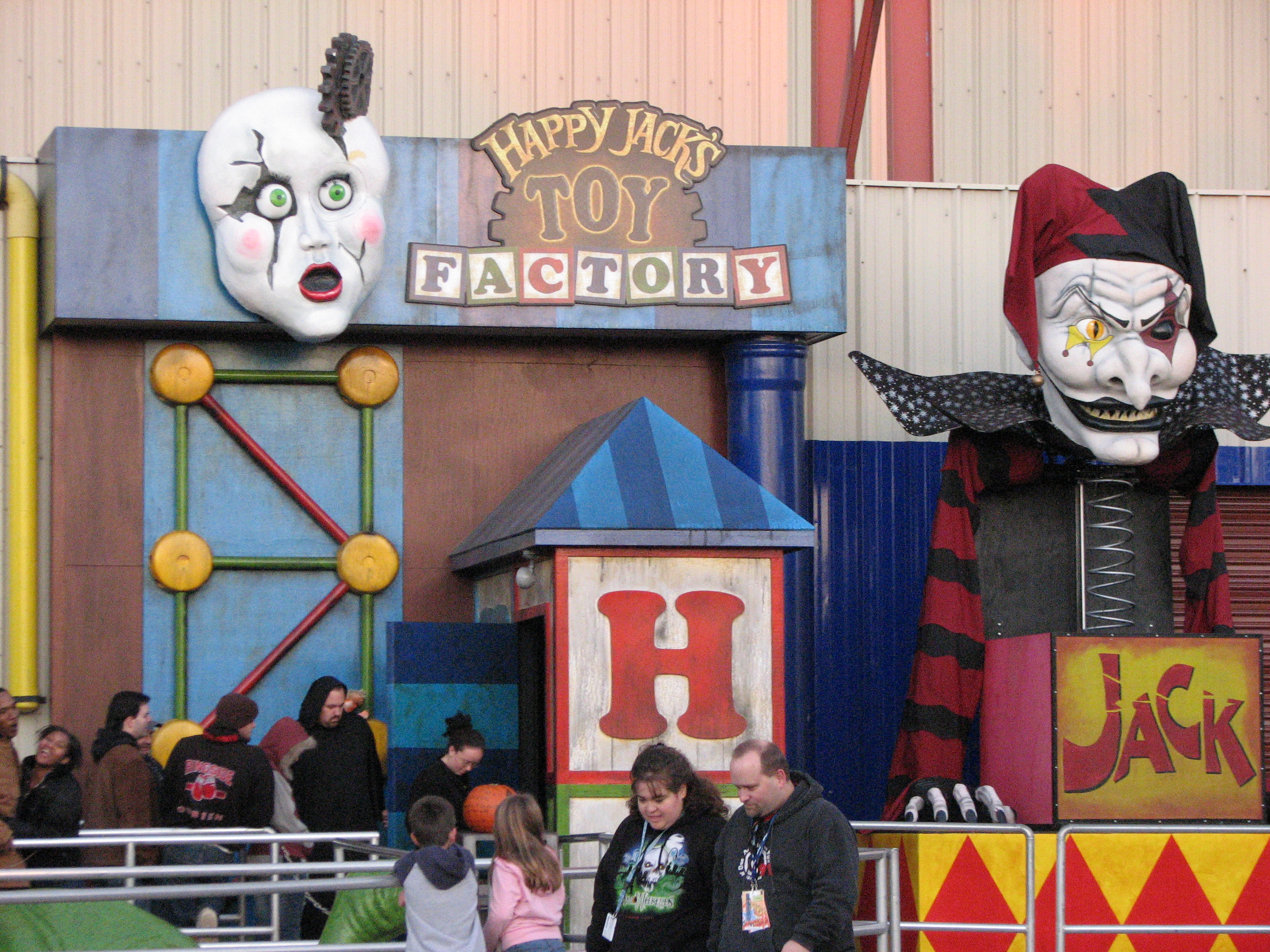
Entrance to Happy Jack's Toy Factory

The building was also used as a storage facility for the park. During HalloWeekends, much of the original queue area was used to house a haunt attraction. It was first used in 1997 for the haunt Cedar Point Cemetery. In 2000, it was transformed into the Egyptian-themed Pharaoh's Secret haunted house. In 2009, it was transformed into Happy Jack's Toy Factory, a haunted toy factory.

The ride, though indoors, would close in any type of rain. Because of leaks in the structure, water pooled in the trough, warranting a shutdown. Typically, the ride would remain shut down after a period of rain as the crew would have to cycle several trains through the circuit in order for it to dry. Although the ride was enclosed, the storage track remained outdoors with a large door that opened when the storage track was needed.

== See also ==
- 2012 in amusement parks
