= MaXair (ride) =

Frisbee ride at Cedar Point

maXair
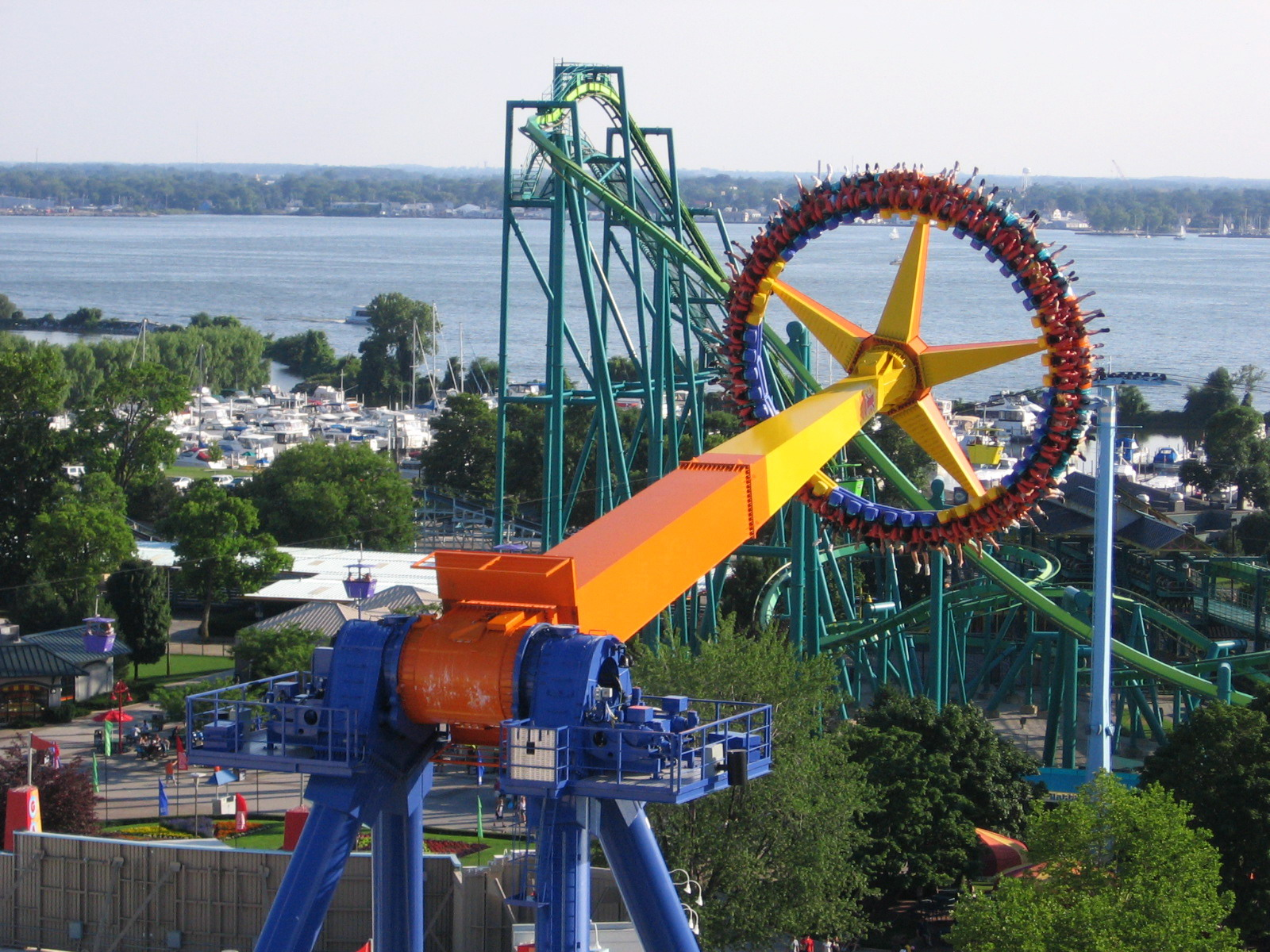
- maXair with Raptor in the background.

Cedar Point
- Area: The Boardwalk
- Coordinates: 41°28′50.92″N 82°40′48.53″W
- Status: Operating
- Opening date: May 7, 2005

Ride statistics
- Manufacturer: HUSS Park Attractions
- Model: Giant Frisbee
- Height: 140 ft (43 m)
- Speed: 70 mph (110 km/h)
- Capacity: 1,000 riders per hour
- Vehicle type: Circular Gondola
- Riders per vehicle: 50
- Duration: 2:30
- Height restriction: 52 in (132 cm)
- Restraints: Over the shoulder
- Fast Lane available

maXair is a Huss Park Attractions Giant Frisbee ride at Cedar Point in Sandusky, Ohio, United States. It is one of two HUSS Giant Frisbees in the United States, the other being Delirium at Kings Island. It is located near the front of the park near Troika, GateKeeper, and Kiddy Kingdom.

== Ride experience ==
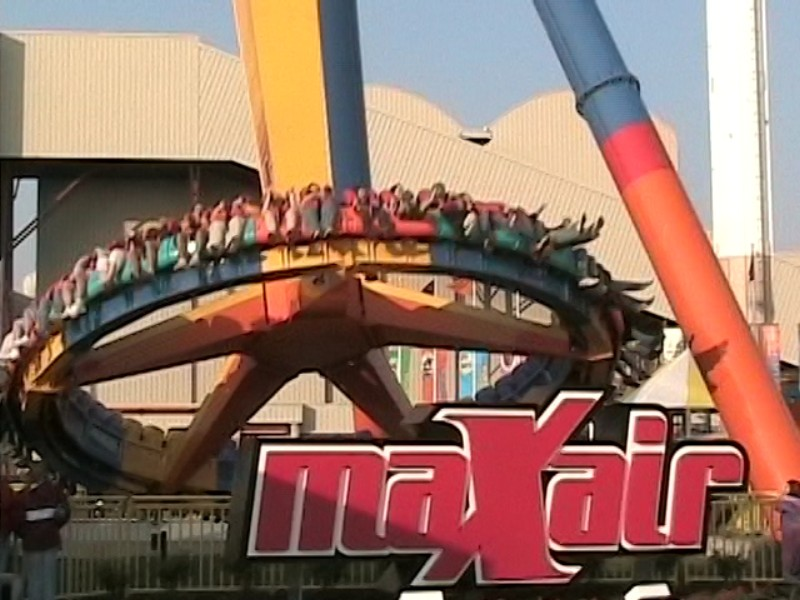
maXair at Cedar Point. Disaster Transport and Space Spiral, two rides removed in 2012 for the construction of GateKeeper, can be seen in the background.

Before the ride starts, the ride operator assigns every rider a seat. When loaded the cycle starts, a movable floor drops to allow clearance for the ride to move. After that, the ride begins to swing back and forth as the circular gondola rotates, gaining more height and speed with each swing. At the peak, riders reach a height of 140 feet (43 m) above the ground although the structure of the ride is only 84 feet (26 m) tall. The pendulum motion propels riders back and forth at 70 miles per hour (110 km/h) up to an arc of 120 degrees, making it one of the fastest non-coaster rides at Cedar Point. At the end of the cycle, the pendulum gradually slows to a stop and the gondola stops rotating. Once the pendulum and gondola are parked at the loading position, the floor rises and the restraints release.

maXair is one of several rides at Cedar Point that require glasses to be secured with an athletic strap. Loose articles may be brought into the queue, but must be secured in small cubbies located around the gondola on the loading platform.

Riders are secured with a ratcheting shoulder harness and a backup seatbelt between the legs. In addition to the seatbelt, the restraints contain sensors which will not allow the ride to be started unless all 50 harnesses have been closed past a certain limit, which is indicated by a green light near each seat.

== See also ==
- Delirium at Kings Island, the only other HUSS Giant Frisbee in the United States.
- Titan at La Ronde, a similar ride produced by Zamperla.
