= Arthur Rodney =

- Born: 1943 (age 82–83)
- Occupation: cruise line executive

Arthur "Art" Rodney is a cruise line executive known for launching two new cruise lines.

Rodney joined the cruise industry at Princess Cruises in 1970. He eventual became chairman at that cruise line. He then went on to launch Crystal Cruises in 1988. Rodney was selected in May 1994 to serve as the first president of the Disney Cruise Line. He resigned on August 31, 1999, as cruise line president. Senior operating officer Matt Ouimet was named as his replacement.
