= Space Spiral =

Defunct gyro tower at Cedar Point

Coordinates: 41.4808°N 82.6795°W

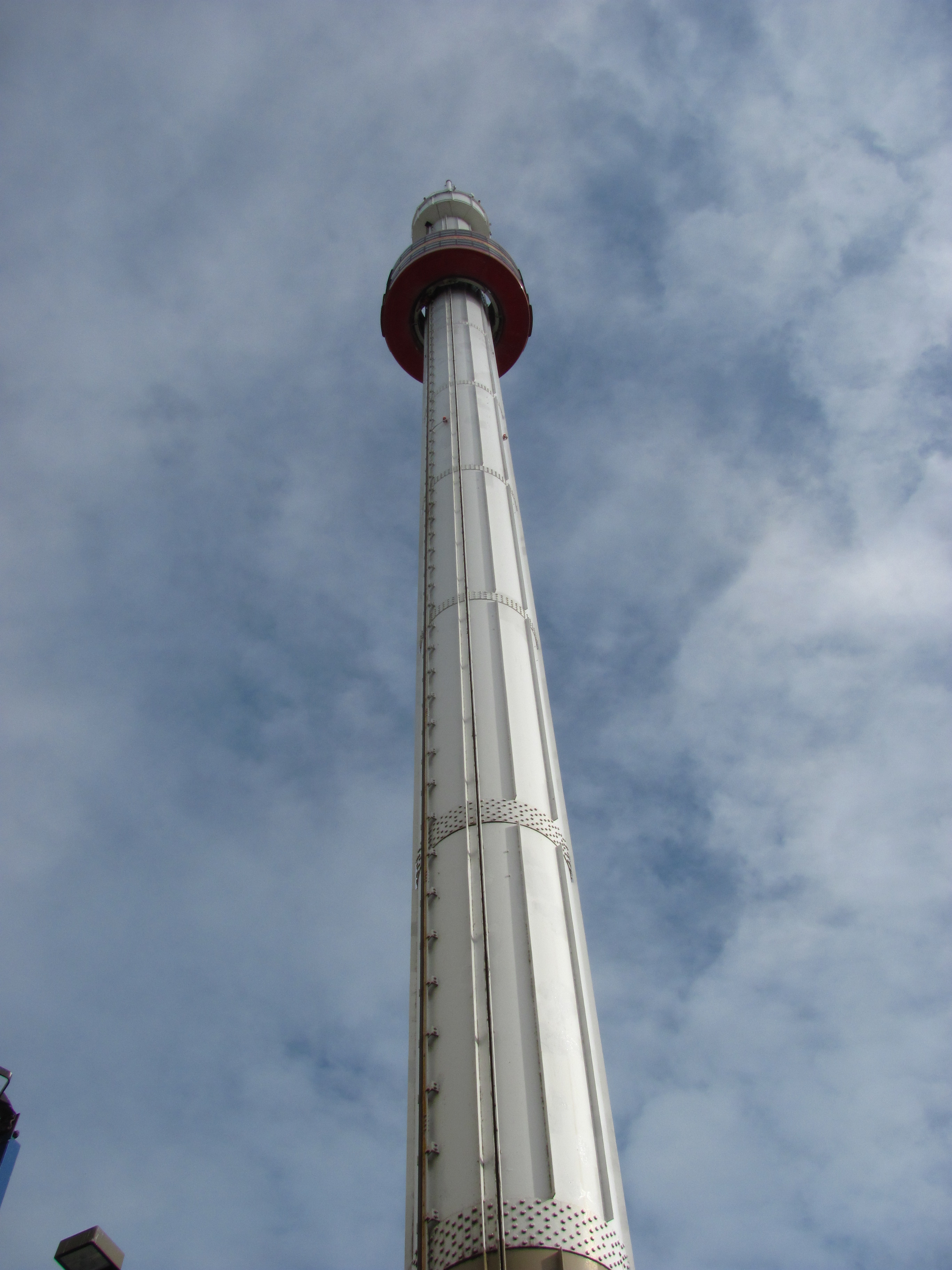

Cedar Point
- Status: Removed
- Cost: $350,000
- Opening date: May 22, 1965
- Closing date: August 14, 2012
- Replaced by: GateKeeper

Ride statistics
- Attraction type: Gyro tower
- Manufacturer: Willy Bühler Space Towers
- Model: Observation Tower
- Height: 330 ft (100 m)

Space Spiral was a gyro tower built by Willy Bühler Space Towers of Berne, Switzerland, with a double-decker cabin provided by Von Roll. It was located at Cedar Point in Sandusky, Ohio, near the front of the park, next to Disaster Transport. It opened in 1965 and closed on August 14, 2012, to make room for GateKeeper. It was demolished on September 12, 2012. On its opening year, it was the fourth of its kind to be built.

== Ride experience ==
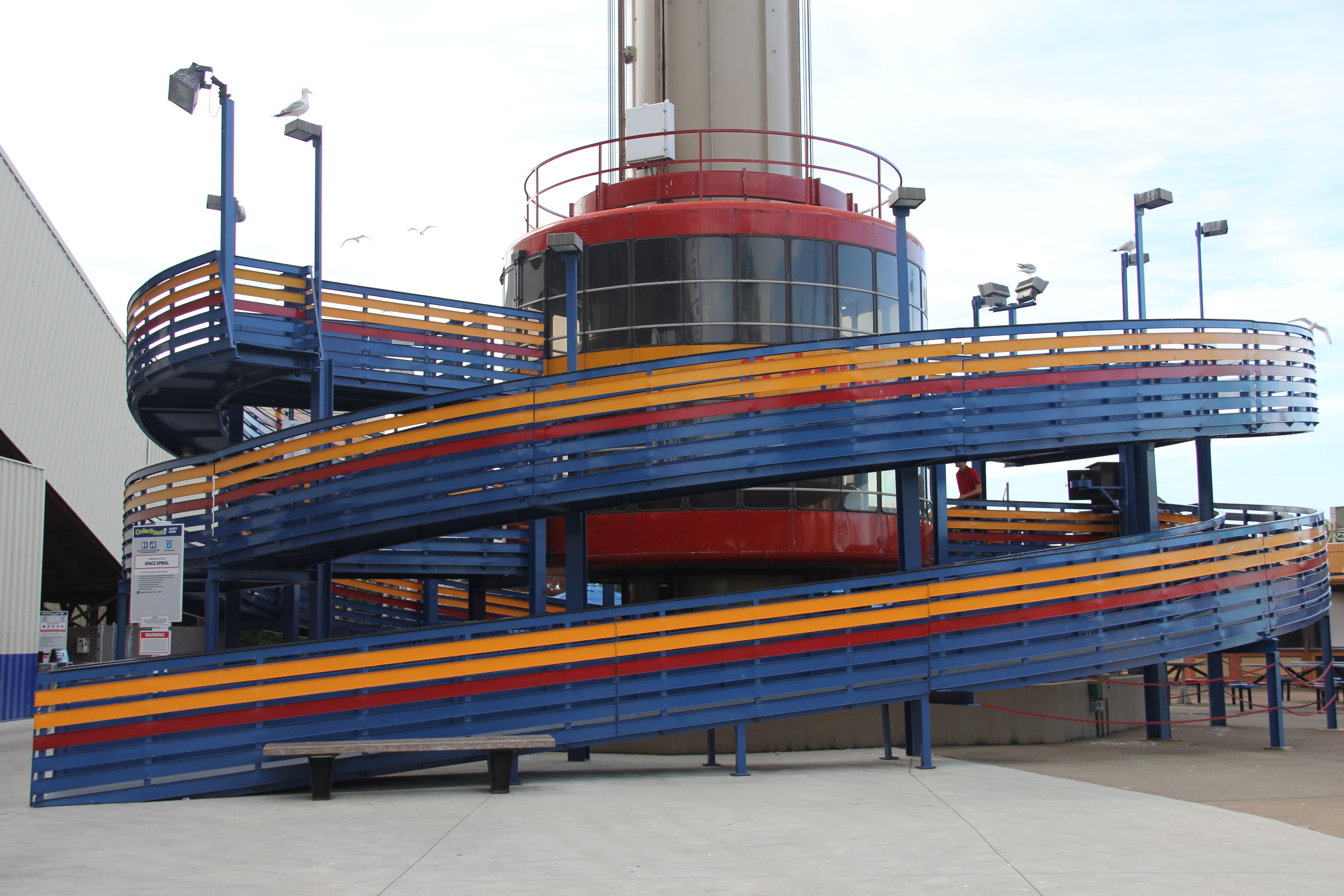
Space Spiral cabin at ride's station in June 2011

Space Spiral gave riders a 360-degree view of the surrounding area. It featured a distinctive two-level cabin, found only on a few early models. However, the second level wasn't used in the ride's later years. The height of the tower was 330 feet (100 m), however riders only reached a height of 285 feet (87 m). It was the tallest ride in the park for decades until Top Thrill Dragster opened in 2003.

== Closure and demolition ==
On July 13, 2012, Cedar Point announced that Space Spiral would close along with the neighboring Disaster Transport. It was first reported that it would stay open through Labor Day, but it closed on August 14, 2012. On the morning of September 12, 2012 at 7:30 AM, it was demolished, and took 17 seconds for the tower to fall. Contractors worked with park maintenance staff to cut into its base, weakening it and about 10 pounds of explosives were added to it.

Both Space Spiral and Disaster Transport would be immediately replaced with GateKeeper for the 2013 season.

== Incident ==
- On May 18, 1985, ten people were stranded on Space Spiral for seven hours. The cab was raised to the top where the passengers and the operator took the stairs down to the ground on the inside of the tower. There were no injuries.
