= HalloWeekends =

Annual amusement park promotion in Ohio

- Genre: Halloween
- Frequency: Annual
- Locations: Cedar Point (1997–present); Dorney Park & Wildwater Kingdom (1998–2007); Valley Fair (1998–2000); Worlds of Fun (1999–2006)
- Years active: 1997–2019, 2021–present
- Website: Official website

HalloWeekends is an annual Halloween event at Cedar Point amusement park in Sandusky, Ohio. It was introduced in 1997, and takes place during the Halloween season, usually from the second Friday after Labor Day until the Sunday before Halloween, or sometimes into early November. The event is open on Thursday Nights, Fridays, Saturdays and Sundays. It is included free with park admission. As of 2021, HalloWeekends features 11 haunted houses and nighttime scare zones, and there are several children's attractions. It is advised that children under 13 years old be accompanied by an adult. HalloWeekend's yearly slogan is "All You Fear is Here!". Other Six Flags parks including Dorney Park & Wildwater Kingdom, Valley Fair, and Worlds of Fun all have formerly used the HalloWeekends name. The name has changed to Halloween Haunt at all 3 parks. Cedar Point is the only Six Flags park that still uses the HalloWeekends name.

== Overview ==
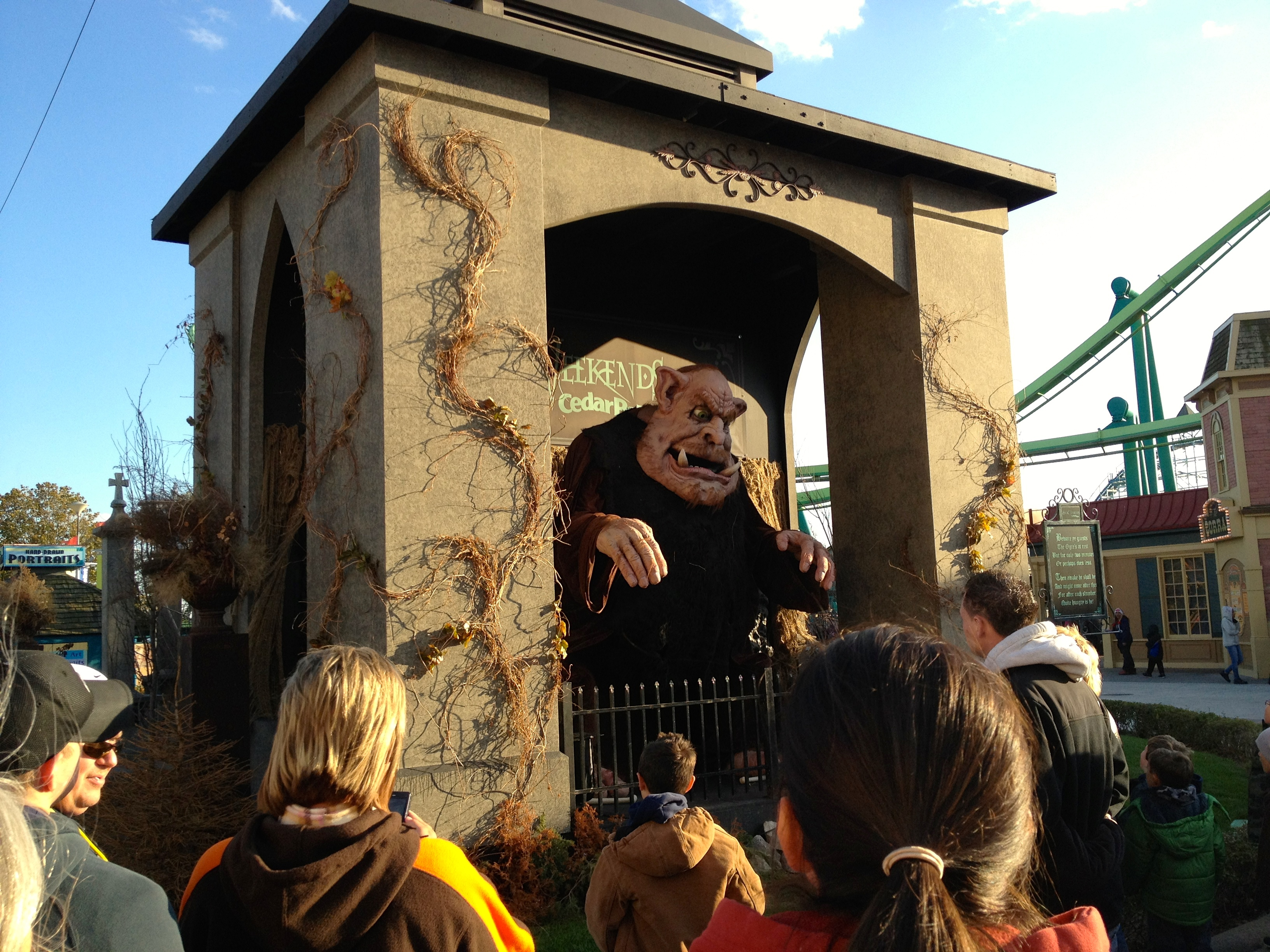
Animatronic monster on display near Celebration Plaza during HalloWeekends at Cedar Point.

HalloWeekends debuted in 1997 and was only open for three weekends. It has since grown to be held on Thursday Nights, Fridays, Saturdays and Sundays during seven weekends in September and October. However, not all of the rides and attractions are open on Friday nights. Attractions include Haunted Houses and Scare Zones. The park is decorated with 1,735 bales of hay, 28,800 cornstalks, 23,000 pounds of pumpkins and other Halloween related items. Located underneath the Sky Ride on the Main Midway in front of Raptor is the Cedar Point Graveyard, also known as "The Land Of The Lost Thrill Rides", which was added to HalloWeekends in 2004 and features tombstones of the park's rides that have been retired from the 1960s onwards. Cars from retired rides are placed around the park. For example, cars from Frontier Lift and formerly Mantis lie in the Cedar Point Graveyard, one from WildCat lied near Gemini and a car from Disaster Transport lied near Power Tower.

During HalloWeekends, the park offers an express ticketing system called Fright Lane for the haunt attractions, similar to Fast Lane. It offers front-of-the-line access for one visit to Deprivation, CornStalkers 2.0, Fearground Freakshow, Eerie Estate, Hexed, and Slaughter House, and unlimited visits through Blood on the Bayou, and Cut Throat Cove.

HalloWeekends has been ranked as one of the best Halloween events in the US. It was ranked fifth for "Best Halloween Event" in the Golden Ticket Awards between 2005 and 2008. In addition, it was ranked fifth again in 2013 and 2014. The event was cancelled in 2020 due to the COVID-19 pandemic. It returned in 2021.

== Attractions ==
=== Historical ===
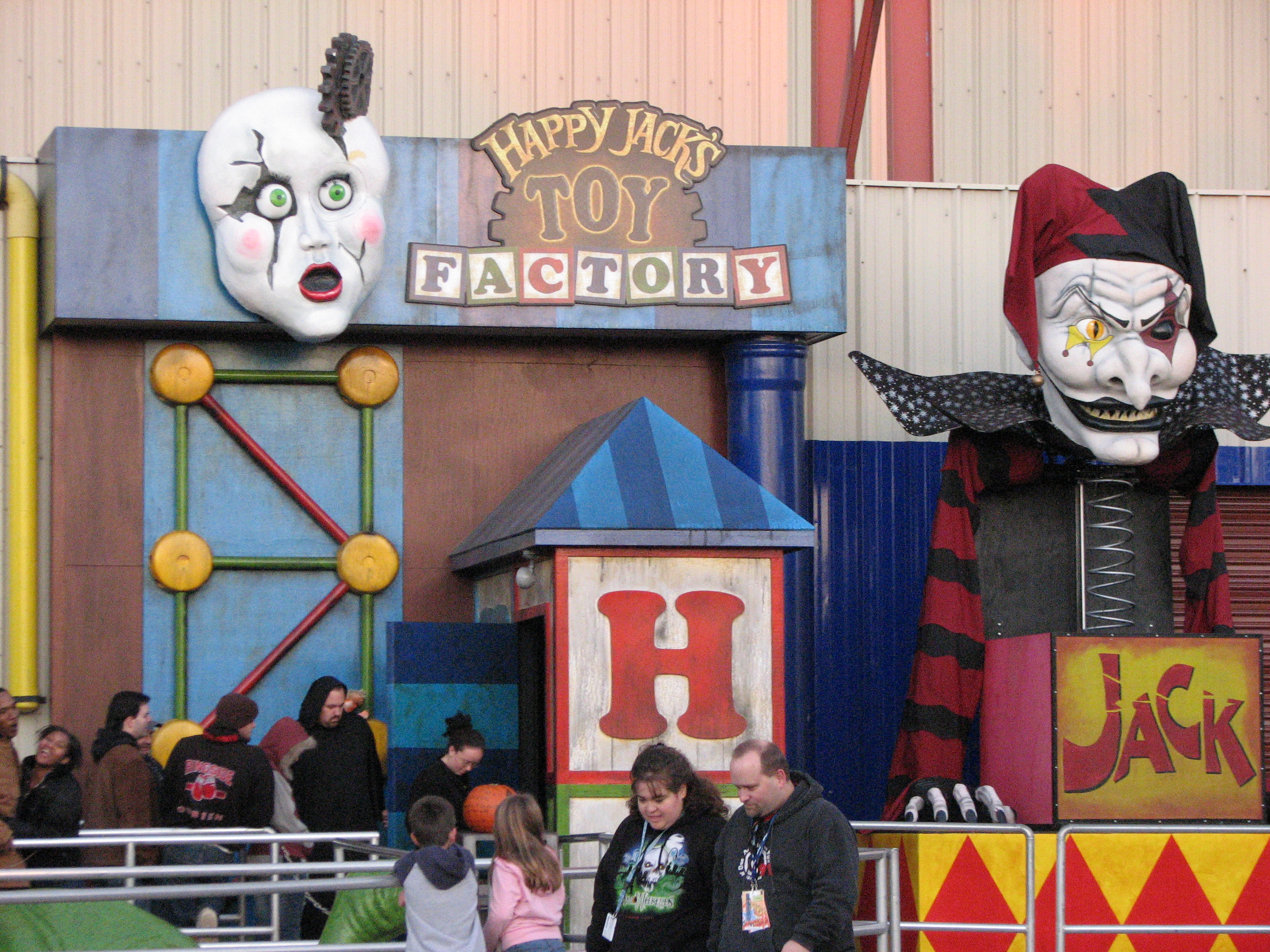
Happy Jack's Toy Factory entrance

Cedar Fair, the park's former owner, acquired Knott's Berry Farm—the first park with a Halloween Haunt—in 1997, and implemented the event throughout the chain, starting with Cedar Point. At its debut, there were only two haunt attractions, Eerie Manor and Cedar Point Cemetery. Guests could travel on the Cedar Point Spooky Express through haunted lagoons and graveyards. The first new attraction, Toxic Tunnel of Terror, was introduced in 1998. Camp Spooky debuted a year later with children's activities in Camp Snoopy. In 2000, Cedar Point Cemetery was re-themed into Pharaoh's Secret. The park added three attractions in 2001, Eerie Manor was re-themed into Undertaker U., and Fright Zone and Magical House on Boo Hill were added.

Fright Zone was introduced on the Frontier Trail in 2001 as the park's first outdoor scare zone. Werewolf Canyon debuted in 2003 in Thunder Canyon. 2004 saw the addition of CarnEvil and Lair of the Vampire. Werewolf Canyon was also expanded that year. Fear Faire, with a medieval theme, was added in 2006. In 2007, the park added the Monster Midway Invasion Celebration Parade which goes from Gemini to the main midway. In 2008, HalloWeekends received a major expansion. CornStalkers replaced Werewolf Canyon, Club Blood replaced Lair of the Vampire, CarnEvil was relocated to Camp Snoopy and Terror Island was added under Millennium Force. The area near Blue Streak was turned into a children's area, Magical House on Boo Hill was relocated and a haybale maze was added. HalloWeekends was extended to eight weekends for the first time.

In 2009, the park replaced Pharaoh's Secret with Happy Jack's Toy Factory and G.A. Boeckling's Eerie Estate opened. Dr. D. Mented's Asylum for the Criminally Insane was added in 2010. For the 2011 HalloWeekends, Cedar Point renamed two attractions due to protests. Dr. D Mented's Asylum for the Crimally Insane was renamed Eternity Infirmary and The Edge of Madness show became The Edge of Madness -- Six Feet Under. Screamworks replaced Fright Zone and Blood on the Bayou was added along the lagoons under Iron Dragon. When Disaster Transport closed in 2012, so did Happy Jack's Toy Factory. Terror Island was relocated under Maverick because the Dinosaurs Alive! attraction was using the path for Terror Island. Its name was changed to Cut Throat Cove. A new haunted house called Eden Musee was built inside Mean Streak's infield. For the 2013 event, Cedar Point introduced Zombie High School, which replaced Club Blood at the front of the park. Trick-or-Treat with the Dinosaurs, which takes place on Adventure Island, was also introduced for kids to collect candy from the dinosaurs.

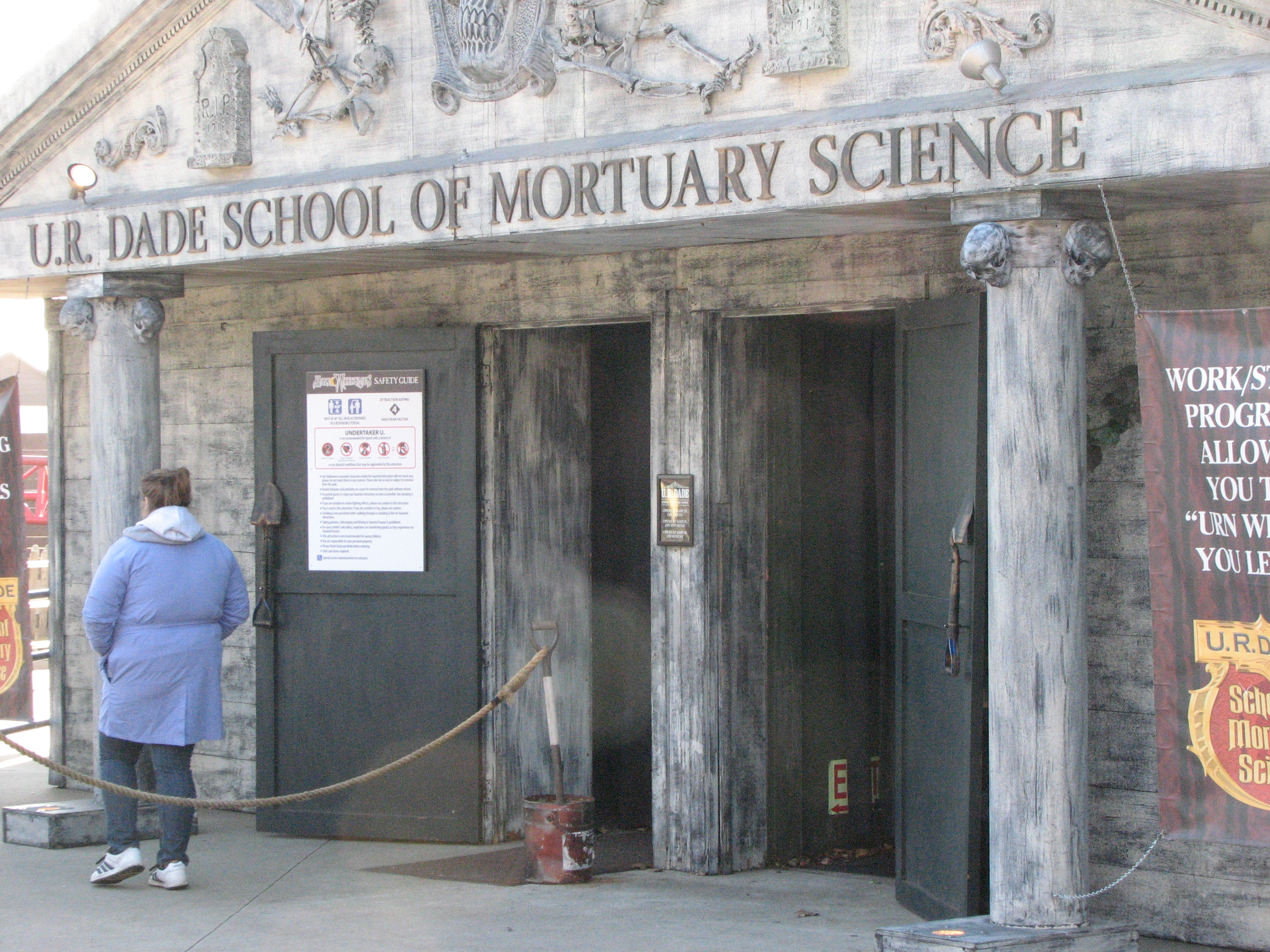
Undertaker U. entrance

In 2014, CarnEvil is replaced by Fear-y Tales in Camp Snoopy, which was closed in 2016 when Camp Snoopy was no longer used as a location for outdoor scare zones. 2014 was also the opening for Tombstone Terror-tory, an old west style outdoor zone located in Frontier Town in the back of the park, and Hexed, a haunted house filled with witches located at the front next to Gatekeeper. In 2015 came Slaughter House, which ironically was located next to the petting zoo off Frontier Trail. The 2017 season saw the openings of two new houses and a 360 scare zone. There was Deprivation: No Way Out (which replaced Eden Musee), a complete blackout house with 3 different mazes inside with the intention of playing on your senses, Fearground Freakshow (which replaced Eternity Infirmary), a big top house filled with undead carnies and other oddities, and the brand new Harvest Fear, an outdoor zone festival that becomes haunted when night falls. Screamworks closed in 2017 and opened up in 2018 as Trail of the Forsaken, which was then closed after the 2019 season. Zombie High School also closes after the 2019, but is not replaced by anything going forward.

Halloweekends was closed for the 2020 season due to the COVID-19 pandemic as the park deemed it unsafe since the social distancing guidelines would make the houses and zones difficult to operate. However, Halloweekends opened back up in 2021 with new hours on Thursdays in October and a brand new scare zone named Banished which ends up replacing the former Trail of the Forsaken. Blood on the Bayou was also moved from the lagoons under Iron Dragon to Adventure Island from this season onwards as well. The 2022 season became more amped up for its 25th anniversary with 2 new houses with Bloodbath replacing Deprivation in Steel Vengeance’s courtyard and The Haunting of Eerie Estate replacing G.A. Boeckling's Eerie Estate.

Former attraction	Opened	Closed	Replaced by
Banished	2021	2022	—N/a
Blood on the Bayou	2011	2025	Crystal Rock Massacre
Bloodbath	2020	2025	Diablo: The Infernal Path
CarnEvil	2004	2014	Fear-y Tales
Cedar Point Cemetery	1997	1999	Pharaoh's Secret
Club Blood	2008	2012	Zombie High School
Deprivation: No Way Out	2017	2021	Bloodbath
Eden Musee	2012	2016	Deprivation
Eerie Manor	1997	2000	Undertaker U.
Eternity Infirmary	2010	2016	Fearground Freakshow
Fear Faire	2006	2013	—N/a
Fear-y Tales	2015	2016	—N/a
Fright Zone	2001	2009	Maniacal Mechanical Screamworks
G.A. Boeckling's Eerie Estate	2009	2021	The Haunting of Eerie Estate
Happy Jack's Toy Factory	2009	2011	—N/a
Harvest Fear	2017	2022	—N/a
Hexed: Lights Out!	2014	2022	Midnight
Lair of the Vampire	2004	2007	Club Blood
Maniacal Mechanical Screamworks	2011	2017	Trail of the Forsaken
Pharaoh's Secret	2000	2008	Happy Jack's Toy Factory
Terror Island	2008	2011	Cut Throat Cove
Toxic Tunnel of Terror	1998	2003	Lair of the Vampire
Trail of the Forsaken	2017	2019	Banished
Undertaker U.	2001	2009	Eternity Infirmary
Werewolf Canyon	2003	2007	CornStalkers
Zombie High School	2013	2019	—N/a

=== Current ===
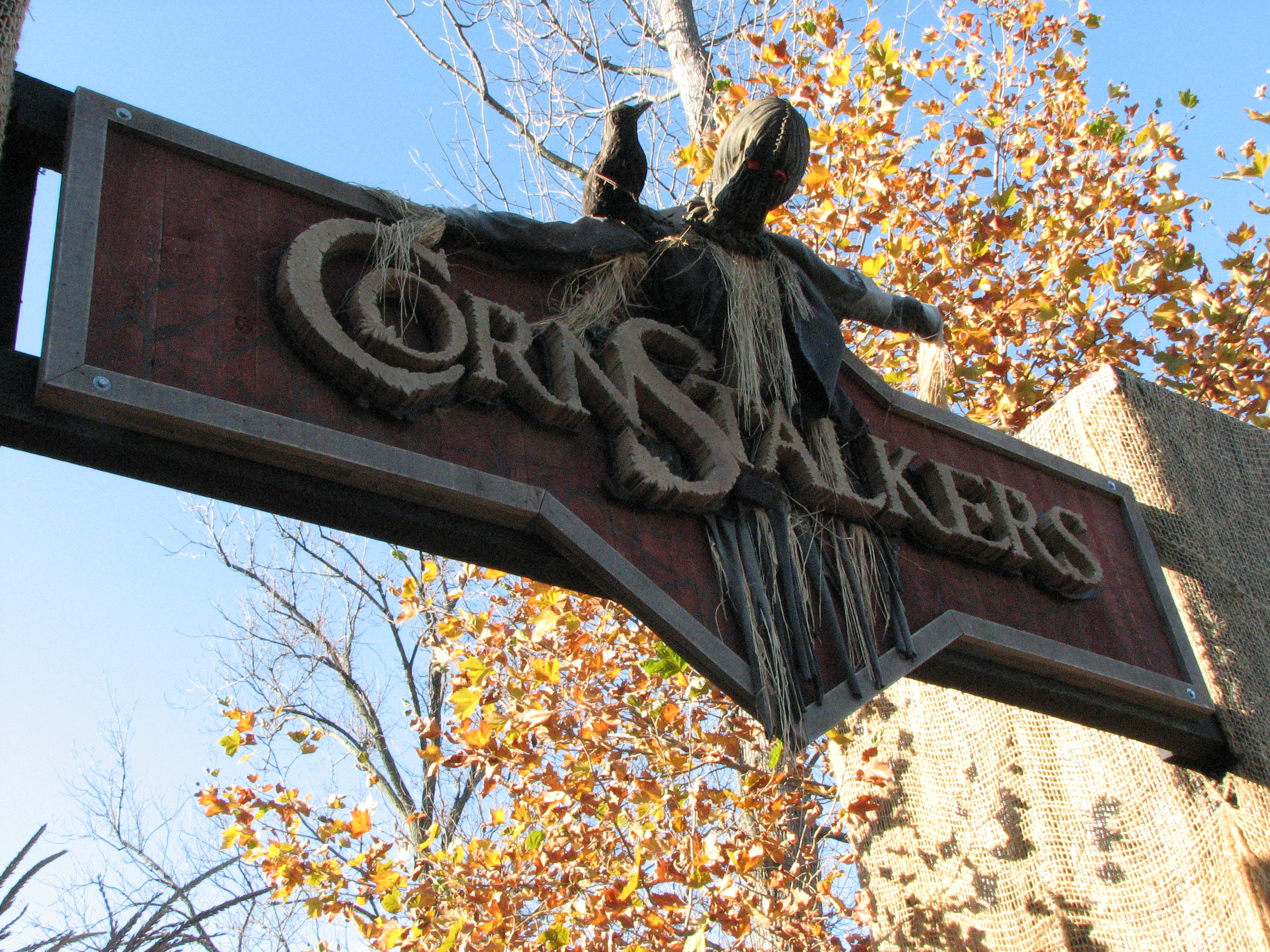
Sign for CornStalkers Scare Zone

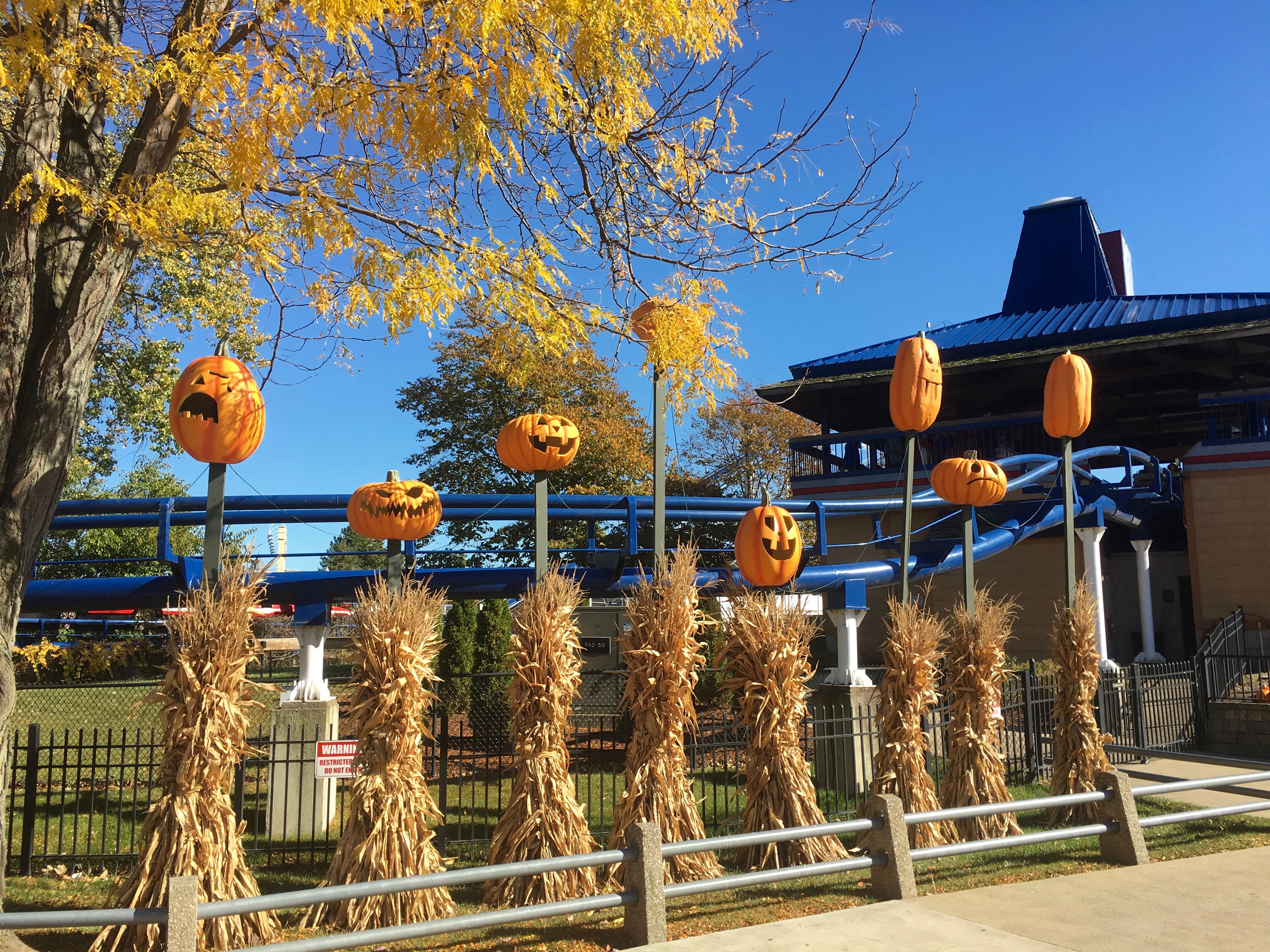
Pumpkins on display near Corkscrew

The attractions are run by the HalloWeekends' Screamsters, a group of Cedar Point staff members who are commanded to scare visitors by icon character Mr. Midnight when night falls. The Overlord debuted in 2009 as Halloweekend's first icon character, and he commanded all the Screamsters to scare people at every opportunity. However, he did not appear for the 2013 season. Knott's Scary Farm's very own Sarah "The Green Witch" Morgan-Marshall took over HalloWeekends as their new and first female leader of the Screamsters in 2014 and 2015. In 2016, a Siren commanded the Screamsters. In 2017, a new Overlord got resurrected, and returned as leader of The Screamsters before being replaced by the Ringmaster in 2018. There was no icon character for the event from 2019-2021. Mr. Midnight was introduced to lead the Screamsters in 2022, along with his Book of the Dark and his sidekick, Mallory.

The Screamsters were introduced in 2001, with 20 staff in a single scare zone. As of 2013, there were about 400 Screamsters, and 25 make-up artists who provide their masks. Each Screamster has an individual character.

As of 2026, HalloWeekends features 10 attractions, including five scare zones and five haunted houses, as well as "SCREAMium" experience The Conjuring: Beyond Fear. The outdoor attractions are Crystal Rock Massacre, Cut Throat Cove, Clownz: Hall of Infamy Tour, Tombstone Terror-tory, and CornStalkers 2.0. The indoor attractions are The Haunting of Eerie Estate, Diablo: The Infernal Path, Midnight, Slaughterhouse and Fearground Freakshow.

In March 2014, Midnight Syndicate announced plans for a series of live multimedia concerts entitled Midnight Syndicate Live! Legacy of Shadows that would run throughout the 2014 HalloWeekends event. They also announced that they would be teaming up with special effects artist, Robert Kurtzman (From Dusk till Dawn) as well as director Gary Jones (Axe Giant) and Face Off contestants, Beki Ingram and David Greathouse. The show opened on September 12 to very positive reviews. The Akron Beacon Journal described it as "Part concert, part movie, part theater, part just plain creepy," going on to call it "top-notch and ambitious." This production would be the final show to run in the Goodtime Theater which was torn down shortly after to make way for park expansion. In March 2017, it was announced that Midnight Syndicate would be returning once again to perform their Midnight Syndicate Live! show at HalloWeekends and that the show would be held in the Jack Aldrich Theater. The production was subsequently brought back the Aldrich Theater for the 2018, 2019, and 2021 seasons. in 2022, the band commemorated its 25-year association with HalloWeekends by co-producing and performing in a new show entitled, Midnight Hour: 25 Years of HalloWeekends and Midnight Syndicate. A compilation album entitled, HalloWeekends: 25 Years of Terror Together was released and sold in the park. The album featured songs that had been heavily used at HalloWeekends over the previous 25 years as well as new music from the Midnight Hour show.

Attraction	Type	Opened	Location
Clownz:Death Metal Tour	Scare Zone	2023	Gemini Midway
The Conjuring: Beyond Fear	SCREAMium	2025	Frontier Town
CornStalkers 2.0: Revenge of the Pumpkin Heads	Haunted Maze	2008	Thunder Canyon
Crystal Rock Massacre	Scare Zone	2026	Adventure Island
Cut Throat Cove	Scare Zone	2012	Near Maverick
Diablo: The Infernal Path	Haunted Maze	2026	Steel Vengeance Infield
Fearground Freakshow	Haunted Maze	2017	Near Wave Swinger
The Haunting of Erie Estate	Haunted Maze	2022	Near Planet Snoopy
Midnight	Haunted Maze	2023	Under Gatekeeper
Slaughter House	Haunted Maze	2015	Frontier Trail
Tombstone Terror-tory	Scare Zone	2014	Frontier Town

== Children's attractions ==
The park features several attractions for children. Several live shows, including the Skeleton Crew acrobatics show that takes place in Celebration Plaza, are performed each day. The Monster Midway Invasion Celebration Parade, which travels along the Main Midway from Gemini to Starbucks on Saturdays, and travels the reverse route on Sundays, takes place at 4 pm. In 2013, the park introduced Howl-O-Palooza in the Blue Streak plaza. It includes several Halloween attractions for children, including a haunted house named Magical House on Boo Hill, a haybale maze and a Kids' Costume Contest. The Camp Snoopy children's area is transformed into Camp Spooky. The Planet Snoopy children's area is transformed into Planet Spooky.

== See also ==
- Halloween Haunt (disambiguation), Halloween events at other Six Flags parks
