= Dick Kinzel =

American business executive

Richard Kinzel
- Born: July 25, 1940 (age 85); Toledo, Ohio
- Occupations: Former CEO of Cedar Fair; Former VP of Cedar Point; Former GM of Valleyfair; Former member of Advisory Board of KeyCorp
- Years active: 1972-2012
- Known for: CEO of Cedar Fair
- Predecessor: Robert L. Munger Jr.
- Successor: Matt Ouimet
- Awards: Golden Ticket Awards, Legends Series 2011

Richard L. Kinzel (born July 25, 1940) is the former president and CEO of Cedar Fair Entertainment Company, promoted to the role in 1986. He was replaced by his successor, Matt Ouimet, on January 2, 2012. Kinzel's career with Cedar Fair had spanned 39 years by the time of his retirement.

== Career highlights ==
=== Valleyfair ===
Richard Kinzel started out at Cedar Point as an employee but was transferred to Valleyfair in 1978 to run the newly acquired park. He served as the General Manager of Valleyfair from 1978 to 1986. In 1986, the then-CEO of Cedar Fair stepped down due to health issues. Kinzel was promoted to president and CEO.

=== CEO of Cedar Fair ===
When Kinzel stepped in as CEO of Cedar Fair, the company owned just two parks: Valleyfair and Cedar Point. His first major highlight was the installation of Magnum XL-200, a hypercoaster at Cedar Point that was intended to draw more crowds to the park. "Magnum" was the first coaster to break 200 feet and is considered by many to have started the so-called "coaster war" competition between amusement parks, which would make up the majority of Kinzel's tenure at Cedar Fair. In 1992, Cedar Fair made their first acquisition with Dick Kinzel as CEO; Dorney Park was acquired from Harris Weinstein.

Six Flags Worlds of Adventure was acquired by Cedar Fair in 2004, and all Looney Tunes and DC Comics theming, walk around character costumes and souvenirs were either removed or destroyed upon completion of the sale. The SeaWorld Ohio exhibit was shuttered and Six Flags vacated the animal exhibits and transported the animals themselves to the company's other parks.

In 2006, Kinzel and Cedar Fair acquired the former Paramount Parks. The deal added all five parks plus their water parks to the Cedar Fair chain. Cedar Fair's revenue went from $569 million to $1 billion. Kinzel is most notable for this move because it expanded Cedar Fair into new markets with competition. In 2010, Kinzel announced that he would retire. On June 20, 2011, it was announced that Matt Ouimet would take over as CEO of Cedar Fair, effective immediately. Dick Kinzel officially retired on January 2, 2012, when his contract was up.

== Life after Cedar Fair ==
In an article in the Toledo Blade, Kinzel stated that life would be very different once he retired. He hadn't had a summer off since joining the company and so planned to take many vacations. Though he'd been asked to work on a few projects, he wanted to take some time off. On May 9, 2013, Kinzel announced that he would be stepping down from the board of directors of Cedar Fair. He also said he plans to stay in Sandusky but has a winter home in Florida.
