= Jumbo Jet (Chelyuskintsev Park) =

Steel roller coaster

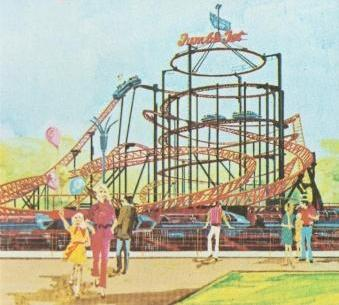
- Advertisement for Jumbo Jet while at Cedar Point

Chelyuskintsev Park
- Coordinates: 53.91976°N 27.6147°E
- Status: Operating
- Opening date: 2015

Dreamland
- Coordinates: 53.931°N 27.517°E
- Status: Removed
- Opening date: 2010
- Closing date: 2014
- Jumbo Jet at Dreamland at RCDB

Beoland
- Coordinates: 56.308°N 43.996°E
- Status: Removed
- Opening date: 2003
- Closing date: 2006
- Jumbo Jet at Beoland at RCDB

Malmö Folkets Park
- Coordinates: 55.594°N 13.015°E
- Status: Removed
- Opening date: 1985
- Closing date: 1989
- Jumbo Jet at Malmö Folkets Park at RCDB

Palace Playland
- Coordinates: 43.515°N 70.375°W
- Status: Removed
- Opening date: Unknown
- Closing date: Unknown
- Jumbo Jet at Palace Playland at RCDB

Cedar Point
- Coordinates: 41.482°N 82.685°W
- Status: Removed
- Opening date: 1972
- Closing date: 1978
- Replaced by: WildCat
- Jumbo Jet at Cedar Point at RCDB

General statistics
- Type: Steel
- Manufacturer: Anton Schwarzkopf
- Designer: Werner Stengel
- Model: Jet Star 3 / Jumbo Jet
- Lift/launch system: Electric spiral lift
- Height: 56 ft (17 m)
- Inversions: 0
- Trains: 3 trains with 2 cars; riders arranged 1 across in 6 rows for a total of 12 riders per train
- Jumbo Jet at RCDB

Jumbo Jet was a steel roller coaster located at Chelyuskintsev Park in Minsk, Belarus. It originally operated from 1972 to 1978 at Cedar Point in Sandusky, Ohio. The roller coaster is a prefabricated model that features an electric spiral lift mechanism, and it was one of the earliest known coasters to use this lift mechanism.

== Ride layout ==
The Jumbo Jet, like all electric spiral lift roller coasters, reached the top of its lift hill by way of a gently-graded spiraling helix, before beginning its first drop. Unlike many roller coasters, which use a traditional chain lift, the Jumbo Jet was propelled with small wheel motors up the incline of the helix. This sort of coaster soon became a very common type of steel roller coaster in the 1970s, and were distinguished from later steel roller coaster designs that were characterized by their thicker, tubular-steel tracks. After climbing the 56-foot-tall (17 m) spiral lift, riders plunge into a series of tight turns using a figure-eight pattern and ending with a double-helix. When it debuted, Jumbo Jet was billed as the fastest of its kind and was known for its views of Lake Erie and steeply banked turns (some at up to 70 degrees).

== History ==
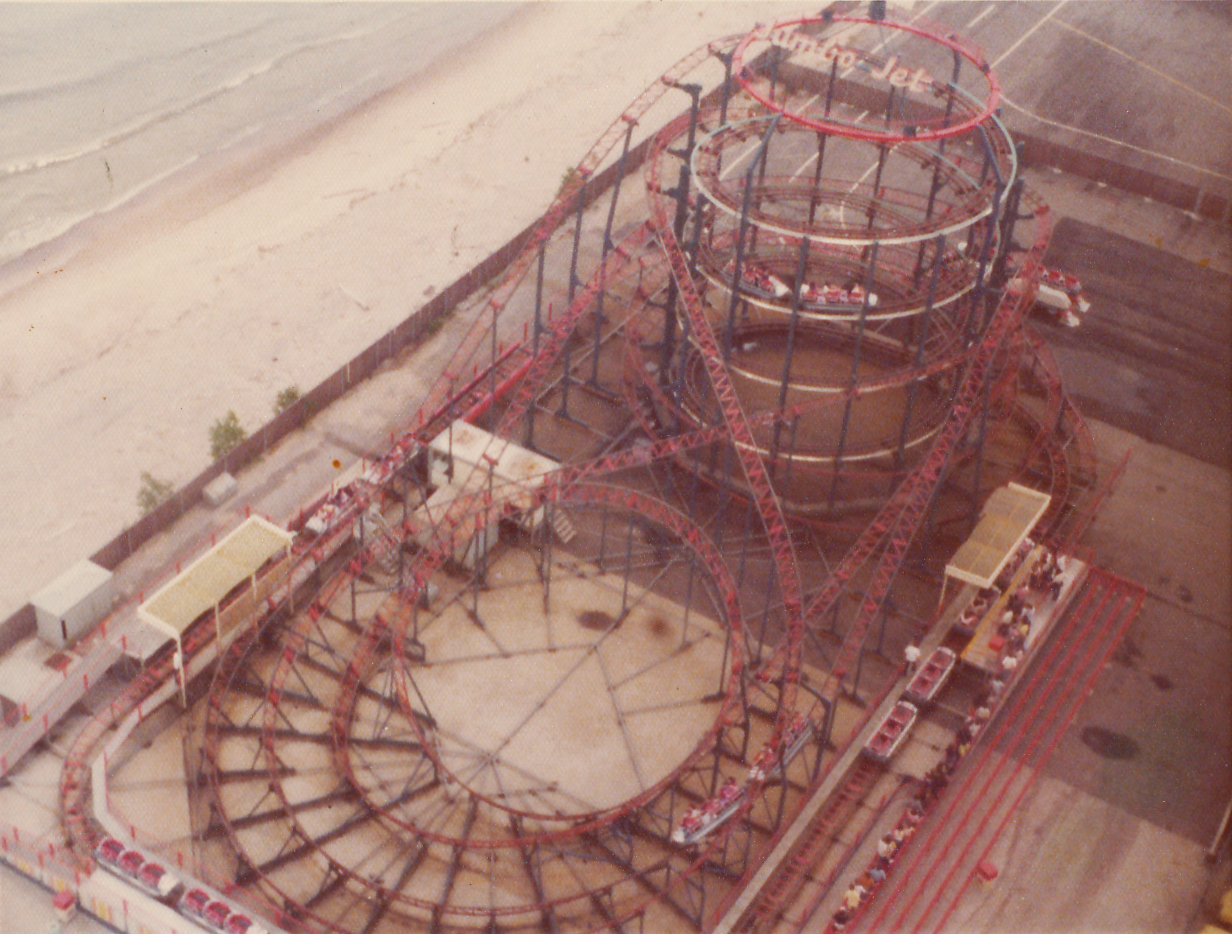
Jumbo Jet in July, 1973

Jumbo Jet was manufactured by notable roller coaster designer Anton Schwarzkopf, and was the first of the Jet Star 3 model in the Jumbo Jet line. The coaster was located in the same beachfront location where a wooden roller coaster called Cyclone once stood before. It was also the location that housed the now-defunct Disaster Transport, an indoor roller coaster, as well as the location where GateKeeper stands presently. While at Cedar Point, Jumbo Jet carried between 1.6 and 1.8 million passengers every year. Jumbo Jet was eventually replaced in 1979 by the new WildCat coaster. Although Jumbo Jet was only at Cedar Point for a short time, the roller coaster subsequently moved to a number of different amusement parks, including Palace Playland in Maine, Malmö Folkets Park in Sweden, Beoland in Russia, Dreamland in Belarus, and its present location of Chelyuskintsev Park also located in Belarus.
