= Matt Ouimet =

American business executive (born 1958)

- Born: Matthew Anthony Ouimet; 1958 (age 67–68)
- Education: BA
- Alma mater: Binghamton University

Matthew Anthony Ouimet (born 1958) is a retired tourism industry executive. Over his 40-plus-year career, Ouimet held leadership positions at both The Walt Disney Company and Cedar Fair Entertainment Company.

== Early life ==
Ouimet was born in 1958 in Cooperstown, New York and raised in Unadilla, New York. His first job was working at a grave yard in Unadilla. He graduated from Unatego High School in 1976 and earned a Bachelor of Science degree in accounting from Binghamton University.

== Career highlights ==
Ouimet started his professional career in 1980 as a certified public accountant at PriceWaterhouse.

Ouimet joined The Walt Disney Company in 1989, starting in finance roles. He served many different parts of the company's theme park business at Walt Disney Imagineering, Disney's Wide World of Sports, and Disney Vacation Club, and as chief financial officer of Disney Development Company (DDC). He was senior vice president of finance and business development for the Walt Disney World Resort until August 1998, when he was transferred to Disney Cruise Line as its senior operating officer. With the resignation of cruise line president Arthur Rodney on August 31, 1999, Ouimet was named as his replacement.

In 2003, Ouimet was appointed president of Disneyland Resort. There he prepared for the resort's 50th anniversary celebration and managed the park's restoration after years of maintenance neglect. In 2006, Ouimet left Disney and was succeeded as president of the Disneyland Resort by Ed Grier in an announcement made July 25.

After leaving Disney, Ouimet joined Starwood as president of the company's hotel group in 2006. He oversaw global operations for more than 850 hotels in 95 countries. In September 2008, he was replaced by Matthew Avril and departed the company.

In December 2008, Ouimet became the president and chief operating officer of Corinthian Colleges, Inc. He announced on October 11, 2010, that he would be leaving Corinthian for personal reasons.

Matt Ouimet was a director of Collective Brands, Inc., where he served on the audit and finance committee.

In June 2011, Ouimet was named president of Cedar Fair Entertainment Company. He assumed the CEO position on January 3, 2012. On October 4, 2017, it was announced by Cedar Fair that Ouimet would be stepping down, having Richard A. Zimmerman succeed him. However, it was also announced that Ouimet would take the newly created role of Executive Chairman.

Ouimet retired in September 2023.

== Personal life ==
As of 2023, Ouimet lives in Cananaigua, New York. He is married, has two grown children, and at least one grandchild.
