= WildCat (Cedar Point) =

Defunct roller coaster

- WildCat in May 2002

Cedar Point
- Location: Cedar Point
- Park section: Celebration Plaza
- Coordinates: 41°28′54″N 82°41′6″W
- Status: Removed
- Opening date: 1979
- Closing date: 2011
- Replaced: Jumbo Jet
- Replaced by: Luminosity – Ignite the Night! Siren's Curse

General statistics
- Type: Steel
- Manufacturer: Anton Schwarzkopf
- Designer: Werner Stengel
- Model: Wildcat/65m
- Track layout: Metal track in an overlapping and interlocking figure-eight configuration
- Lift/launch system: Chain lift
- Height: 50 ft (15 m)
- Length: 1,837 ft (560 m)
- Speed: 40 mph (64 km/h)
- Inversions: 0
- Duration: 1:25
- Capacity: 900 riders per hour
- Height restriction: 48 in (122 cm)
- Trains: 7 trains with a single car; riders arranged 2 across in 2 rows for a total of 4 riders per train
- WildCat at RCDB

WildCat was a steel roller coaster located at Cedar Point in Sandusky, Ohio. Designed by Werner Stengel and manufactured by Anton Schwarzkopf, the ride opened to the public in 1979. Cedar Point decided in 2012 to remove WildCat to allow for expansion of the Celebration Plaza, also citing that the coaster had reached the end of its service life. It was dismantled and scrapped.

== History ==
WildCat opened at Cedar Point in 1979. It was the 65m variant of the Schwarzkopf Wildcat model where small cars (each holding four passengers) take many tight turns and small hills that produce negative g-forces as well as strong lateral forces. Riders were required to be at least 48" tall and be able to climb down vertical ladders in the case of an emergency evacuation. Riders were secured by a seatbelt and lap bar. At the end of the ride, riders were given a visual signal by the operator to extend their arms and hold on, as the train stops extremely quickly. It was the second Cedar Point ride to use the WildCat name following the 1970 installation, Wildcat, which was an identical 65m Schwarzkopf Wildcat.

In 1997, the ride vehicles received seatbelts after the death of a teenager on a similar ride at Bell's Amusement Park in Oklahoma.

WildCat is the only roller coaster in Cedar Point that has been relocated since being built. WildCat had been in two previous places before settling in its final location, across from Iron Dragon. WildCat gave more than 25 million rides since its debut. Although this figure-8 designed coaster was a park favorite, ridership declined over the years from over 500,000 riders in 1996 down to 300,000 riders in 2008.

On May 2, 2012, Cedar Point announced the permanent removal and dismantling of the WildCat roller coaster prior to the opening of the 2012 season for the expansion of Celebration Plaza. WildCat was demolished and scrapped before the season started.

== Incidents ==
On May 29, 1994, a 14-year-old girl from Michigan fainted while riding the WildCat. She was taken to a nearby hospital, where she died a few hours later. The coroner attributed her death to an inflamed heart that was caused by an upper respiratory infection. He claimed that the ride did not cause of her death.

On May 16, 2008 during the opening weeks of the season, WildCat suffered a "roll back". A car traveling up the lift hill did not make it all the way up and rolled back down, hitting another car. This incident injured nine guests, of which eight were treated at the first aid station in the park, and one was treated and released at Firelands Memorial Hospital. Due to this accident, the ride was closed for a month. It reopened in late June 2008 after a section of track was replaced.

In the evening of June 5, 2011, two cars of WildCat collided, injuring seven people, none seriously. Three people were taken to Firelands Regional Medical Center as a precaution and four were released from the first aid station without further treatment. The crash was classified as an "incident" by the US Department of Agriculture.

== See also ==
- 2011 in amusement parks
