= List of Dollywood attractions =

This is a list of Dollywood attractions.

== The Dolly Parton Experience ==
- Song-teller
- Behind the Seams
- Dolly's Home-On-Wheels
- Dreamsong Theater

== Country Fair ==
Attraction	Added	Manufacturer	Description
Amazing Flying Elephants	2005	Zamperla	Elephant-themed kids ride
Busy Bees	2005	I.E. Park	Bee -themed kids ride
Demolition Derby			Bumper cars
Lemon Twist	2005	Technical Park	Tea cups ride
Lucky Ducky	2005	I.E. Park	Duck-themed kids ride
Piggy Parade	2005	Zamperla	Pig themed kids jumping ride
Scrambler	1993	Eli Bridge Company	Spinning scrambler ride
Shooting Star	2005		Kids drop tower
Sky Rider	2005	Chance Rides	Elevating spinning ride
Waltzing Swinger	2005	Sartori	Elevated spinning ride

== Craftsman's Valley ==
Attraction	Added	Manufacturer	Description
Blazing Fury	1978	Built in House	Indoor roller coaster with dark ride elements
Daredevil Falls	1998	Hopkins Rides	Log flume that can seat two across
Tennessee Tornado	1999	Arrow Dynamics	Enthusiast-acclaimed looping coaster

- Calico Falls Schoolhouse
- Eagle Mountain Sanctuary
- Robert F. Thomas Chapel

== Owens Farm ==
Attraction	Added	Manufacturer	Description
Barnstormer	2011	S&S Worldwide	Screamin Swing ride

- Pig Pen, a small playground
- Granny's Garden, a small playground
- Li'L Pilot's Playground, a small playground

== Jukebox Junction ==
Attraction	Added	Manufacturer	Description
Lightning Rod	2016	Rocky Mountain Construction	Hybrid Roller Coaster
Rockin' Roadway	1995	Chance Rides	Car ride

- Pines theater

== Rivertown Junction ==
Attraction	Added	Manufacturer	Description
Smoky Mountain River Rampage	1986	Barr Engineering	River Rapids ride

- Tennessee Mountain Home
- Back porch Theater

== Showstreet ==
- Friendship Gardens
- Dollywood Celebrity Theater
- Showstreet Palace Theater

== Timber Canyon ==
Attraction	Added	Manufacturer	Description
Drop Line	2017	Funtime Inc.	Drop tower
Lumberjack Lifts	2006	Heege	Tower climbing ride
Mystery Mine	2007	Gerstlauer	Euro-fighter roller coaster
Thunderhead	2004	Great Coasters International	Wooden roller coaster
Whistle Punk Chaser	2017	Zamperla	Family Gravity Coaster

== The Village ==
Attraction	Added	Manufacturer	Description
Dollywood Express	1961	Baldwin Locomotive Works	train ride
Village Carousel	1999	Chance	Carousel

- Imagination Playhouse

== Wilderness Pass ==
Attraction	Added	Manufacturer	Description
FireChaser Express	2014	Gerstlauer	Family roller coaster with two launches and a lift hill
Wild Eagle	2012	Bolliger & Mabillard	Wing roller coaster

== Wildwood Grove ==
Attraction	Added	Manufacturer	Description
NightFlight Expedition	2026	Mack Rides	Indoor Hybrid coaster/Whitewater River ride
Big Bear Mountain	2023	Vekoma	Family launched coaster
Black Bear Trail	2019	Metallbau Emmeln	Track ride allowing riders to ride on the back of a bear
Dragonflier	2019	Vekoma	Family Suspended Coaster that "mimics the flight of a dragonfly"
Frogs and Fireflies	2019	Zamperla	A children's flat ride allowing riders to ride on the back of a frog as it hops
Great Tree Swing	2019	Zamperla	A swinging ship style ride themed to a sycamore leaf in the air
Mad Mockingbird	2019	Larson	Classic spinning flat ride allowing riders to "fly" on the Tennessee state bird
Treetop Tower	2019	Zamperla	A spinning tower providing a view of the surrounding area

- Hidden Hollow, a soft-play area
- Wildwood Tree, an artificial tree with light-up leaves and butterflies
- Wildwood Creek, a splash pad play area

== Defunct ==
Attraction	Located	Type	Manufacturer	Opened	Closed	Details
Scamper	Country Fair	Wooden Wild Mouse	Adolph Heinrich	1970	1977	Previously operated at Cedar Point (1963–1969)
The Butter Churn	Country Fair	Trabant	Chance Rides		1986	
Flooded Mine	Craftman's Valley	Indoor Float-Through	Built in House	1977	1997	Built based on Flooded Mine (1968) at Silver Dollar City. Replaced with Daredevil Falls
The Rocky Springs Carousel	The Village	Carousel	Dentzel Carousel Company	1990	1998	Carousel dates to 1901, but was updated to the 3 row design by Dentzel in 1924. Previously at Rocky Springs Park (1901–1923,1924-1983), and Lake Lansing Park (1983–1987). Purchased by the Rocky Springs Carousel Association in 1999. Currently in storage. Replaced with the Village Carousel.
The Balloon Race	Owens Farm	Balloon Race	Zamperla	1988	1999	Originally in Country Fair, later moved to Owens Farm in 1993
Thunder Express	Craftsman's Valley	Mine Train	Arrow Dynamics	1989	1999	Previously operated as a second track of River King Mine Train at Six Flags St. Louis. Relocated to Magic Springs & Crystal Falls where it opened in 2002 as Big Bad John. Replaced by Tennessee Tornado
Country Fair Falls	Country Fair	Log Flume	Arrow Development	1967	2004	Originally built for the 1964 New York World's Fair.
Swingamajig	Country Fair	Waveswinger	Chance Rides	1980	2004	Replaced with Waltzing Swinger
Tennessee Twister	Country Fair	Tilt-A-Whirl	Larson International	1993	2004	
Timber Tower	Timber Canyon	Topple Tower	HUSS	2006	2012	Replaced with Drop Line
Adventure Mountain	Wilderness Pass	Ropes Course	Ropes Courses Inc	2010	2012	Tower structures repurposed for FireChaser Express
Sideshow Spin	Country Fair	Steel Kiddie Coaster	L&T Systems	2005	2016	formerly VeggieTales Sideshow Spin. Relocated to Kentucky Shores Family Fun Center
Wonder Wheel	Country Fair	Ferris Wheel	Eli Bridge Company	1993	2017	
River Battle	Wilderness Pass	Splash Battle	Mack Rides	2008	2017	
Mountain Slidewinder	Owens Farm	Dinghy Waterslides		1987	2018	
Dizzy Disk	Country Fair	Disk-O	Zamperla	2005	2023	

- Imagination Cinema
- Inventor's Mansion
- The Rainmaker
- Cloud Grabber (Opened 1980, Closed 1984)
- Southern Gospel Museum and Hall of Fame
- Chasing Rainbows
- Little Swinger
- Convoy (Closed 2004)
- Fight of the Century
- Imagination Station
- Treehouse
- Bullfrog Creek
- Beehive
- SkyZip
- Barnwood Theater
