= Steve Summers =

American designer and costumer to Dolly Parton

Steven Kent Summers is an American costumer and creative director for Dolly Parton. He has been styling Dolly Parton for more than 30 years.

== Early life and education ==
Summers was raised in Harriman, Tennessee. At age 2, he lost 75 percent of his hearing as a result of the mumps and is legally deaf. In his twenties, he worked as general manager at a retail store. He then went on to attend college to study English where he also sang with a group called the Celebration Singers.

== Career ==
In 1991, Summers auditioned as a singer/dancer at Dollywood and Opryland, and after offers from both signed on to Dollywood. He eventually became one of Dolly Parton's onstage dance partners. After five years of performing there, Summers began designing sets and scenery for the productions, and later began designing wardrobe pieces. He remained on staff at Dollywood for 15 years.

In 2006, Summers was appointed Parton's creative director for Dolly Parton Enterprises. At this point, Parton sent Summers to attend the Fashion Institute of Technology.

As creative director and stylist, Summers and his team created up to 300 ensembles for Parton each year. All of the clothing was customized, including the shoes Parton wore, and is kept in a 50,000 square foot warehouse that stores archival pieces going back to 1964. Summers was also involved in all visual aspects of Parton's production, including album covers and stage sets; embellishing Parton's guitars and creating costume jewelry. Additionally, he helped design and create the Chasing Rainbows Museum at Dollywood.

Among Summers' designs for Parton was the dress she wore for her 50th wedding anniversary to Carl Dean in 2016.

In 2020, Summers made his directorial debut with the "When Life is Good Again" music video, featuring Dolly Parton. During the COVID-19 pandemic, Summers helped produce a series of virtual interviews and other content with Parton. He also was a producer for her 2022 holiday special "Dolly Parton's Magic Mountain Christmas."

== Personal life ==
Summers was married for 23 years beginning in his twenties, and has three children. He came out as gay at age 44 and in 2008 met his now-husband, architect and interior designer Mark Williams.
