= For the Love of Dolly =

- Directed by: Tai Uhlmann
- Produced by: Valerie Stadler
- Release date: 2006
- Running time: 56 minutes
- Country: United States

For the Love of Dolly is a 2006 documentary film directed by Tai Uhlmann. It focuses on five colorful Dolly Parton fans and explores their fascination with the singer. The film made its debut at the 2006 Miami Film Festival.

== Synopsis ==
This documentary was filmed over the course of a year and shows five of Dolly's most avid fans as they follow her career. Dolly Parton's upbeat attitude, sense of humor and great talent allow her to inspire fans across the country. The film is made up of interviews, footage of daily life, trips to Dolly concerts and pilgrimages to Dollywood, the Dolly Parton theme park. The film documents the ways that Dolly's fans exhibit not only their adoration for Dolly, but also their need to be close to her, literally following her career as they travel to as many venues where she makes appearances as possible. For the Love of Dolly shows that fandom can give meaning to some people's lives, but it can also overwhelm the lives of others.

== Cast ==
- Harrell Gabehart as himself
- Judy Ogle as herself
- Patric Parkey as himself
- Dolly Parton as herself
- Jeannette Williams as herself
- Melisa Rastellini as herself
- David Schmidli as himself

== Reception ==
The Austin Chronicle suggested that the film might be "the first documentary used as evidence in a restraining order case".
