= Dragonflier =

Suspended family roller coaster

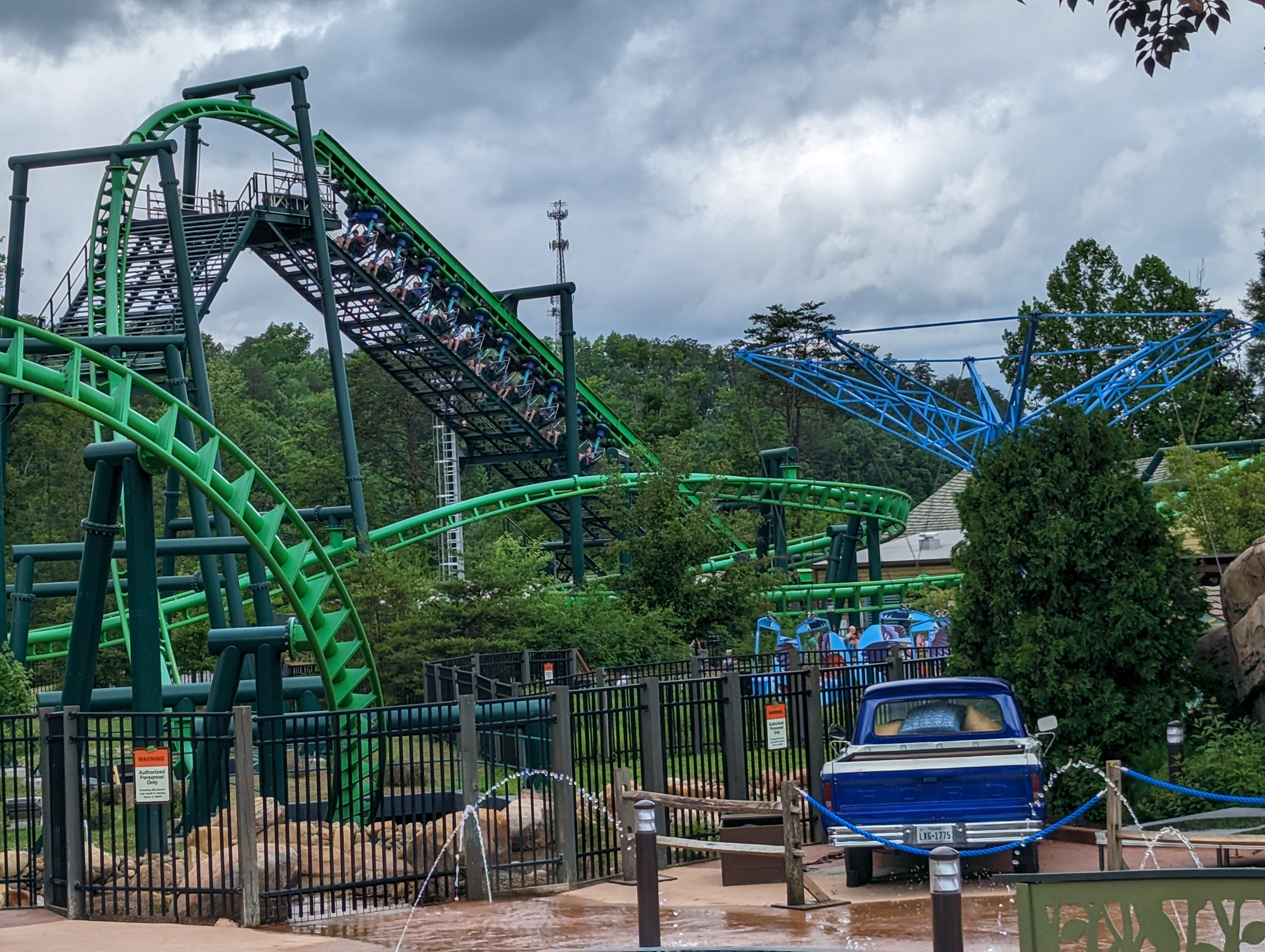

Dollywood
- Location: Dollywood
- Park section: Wildwood Grove
- Coordinates: 35.797749°N 83.531204°W
- Status: Operating
- Opening date: May 10, 2019

General statistics
- Type: Steel – Family – Inverted
- Manufacturer: Vekoma
- Model: Suspended Family Coaster (453m)
- Track layout: Twister
- Lift/launch system: Drive tire
- Height: 63.3 ft (19.3 m)
- Length: 1,486.2 ft (453.0 m)
- Speed: 46.6 mph (75.0 km/h)
- Inversions: 0
- Duration: 1:00
- Capacity: 720 riders per hour
- G-force: 3.5
- Height restriction: 39 in (99 cm)
- Trains: Single train with 10 cars. Riders are arranged 2 across in a single row for a total of 20 riders per train.
- Website: Official website
- Dragonflier at RCDB

Dragonflier is a Vekoma Suspended Family Coaster at Dollywood in Pigeon Forge, Tennessee. The coaster debuted in 2019 as part of the $37 million, 5.5-acre Wildwood Grove park area, which was targeted at families and children. The ride features a seven-story first drop into a tunnel, a top speed of 46.6 mph (75.0 km/h), and a total track length of 1,486.2 feet (453.0 m). This is the first 453m clone in the United States.

== History ==
In October 2017, the park began clearing out and leveling massive swaths of land in between the Timber Canyon area of the park and the Dollywood Express train course, which was immediately deduced to be a 2019 park expansion and leading to intense speculation on what was to come in the park's future years. Following land clearing taking place throughout the winter, it was reported in February 2018 that Dollywood officials were meeting with members of the Pigeon Forge Planning Commission in order to discuss the development of a 5-acre plot of land located between the Thunderhead coaster and the parking lot. In March 2018, plans submitted to the Planning Commission were uncovered and broadcast online, showing off a family-intended park expansion, which included several flat rides and an inverted coaster, which was quickly deduced to be the 453m variant of the popular Dutch firm Vekoma's Suspended Family Coaster model.

With land clearing completed, early construction began on the new area, with footers being poured of the then-unknown Dragonflier coaster in July 2018. Amid several teasers, the name and logo of the new area, Wildwood Grove, became public knowledge on July 24, and the park subsequently set an announcement date for August 3, 2018. On the said date, Dragonflier was formally announced by Dolly Parton and park staff as part of the $37,000,000 Wildwood Grove, which would offer several new rides and amenities, as well as their first expansion to the park's footprint since 2008.

After track began arriving in September 2018, Dragonflier quickly went vertical and was mostly constructed during the fall, with 85% of the layout reportedly having been completed by late November 2018. By 2019, the track was completed, and work would continue throughout the winter on the surrounding area and station in order to meet the anticipated May 2019 opening. The coaster began testing in and around April 2019, and Wildwood Grove - including Dragonflier - had its grand opening on May 10, 2019.

== Characteristics ==
=== Statistics ===
Dragonflier has a top speed of 46.6 mph (75.0 km/h) and a total length of 1,486.2 feet (453.0 m). Although the ride reaches a max height of 63.3 feet (19.3 m), its layout stays relatively low to the ground. The coaster is noted for its first drop, which plunges into a short tunnel and thus surpasses the ride's height. It runs a single, 20 passenger train, which restrains guests with lap bars and is mounted below the track; typical for an inverted coaster. The ride's lift hill also utilizes drive tires instead of the traditional chain lift used on the majority of inverted/suspended coasters, thus rendering the climb to the top of the hill as a quiet one.

=== Model ===
Dragonflier was manufactured by Dutch-firm Vekoma, and is one of the 453m clones of their Suspended Family Coaster model. The original, Orkanen at Fårup Sommarland in Denmark, was opened in 2013 and has its first tunneled drop diving into the lagoon. As of 2021, 11 of the 453m variant are either in operation or under construction across the globe.

== Ride experience ==
Dispatching the station, riders make a 90° left turn into the lift hill, which utilizes drive tires to propel the train to its 63.3-foot (19.3 m) height. Upon reaching the top, riders bank slightly to the left and plunge into a subterranean tunnel, rising up into a forceful overbanked turn (similar to a Cutback). The train speeds up into a helix, following a jump over the station building and yet another helix. Riders twist into a turnaround and make a final 90° turn into the station, where the train comes to a stop. The entire ride lasts just one minute.

== Reception ==
Dragonflier and the collective area of Wildwood Grove received unanimous praise from local media and park guests alike. Dragonflier itself received praise for its layout, aesthetics, ride experience, and appeal to both children and thrill seekers alike, while coaster enthusiasts lauded its surprise forces and smooth tracking. On September 9, 2019, Wildwood Grove won a prestiged Golden Ticket Award from coaster industry newspaper Amusement Today for Best Kids Area.
