= Chasing Rainbows Museum =

Former Museum at Dollywood

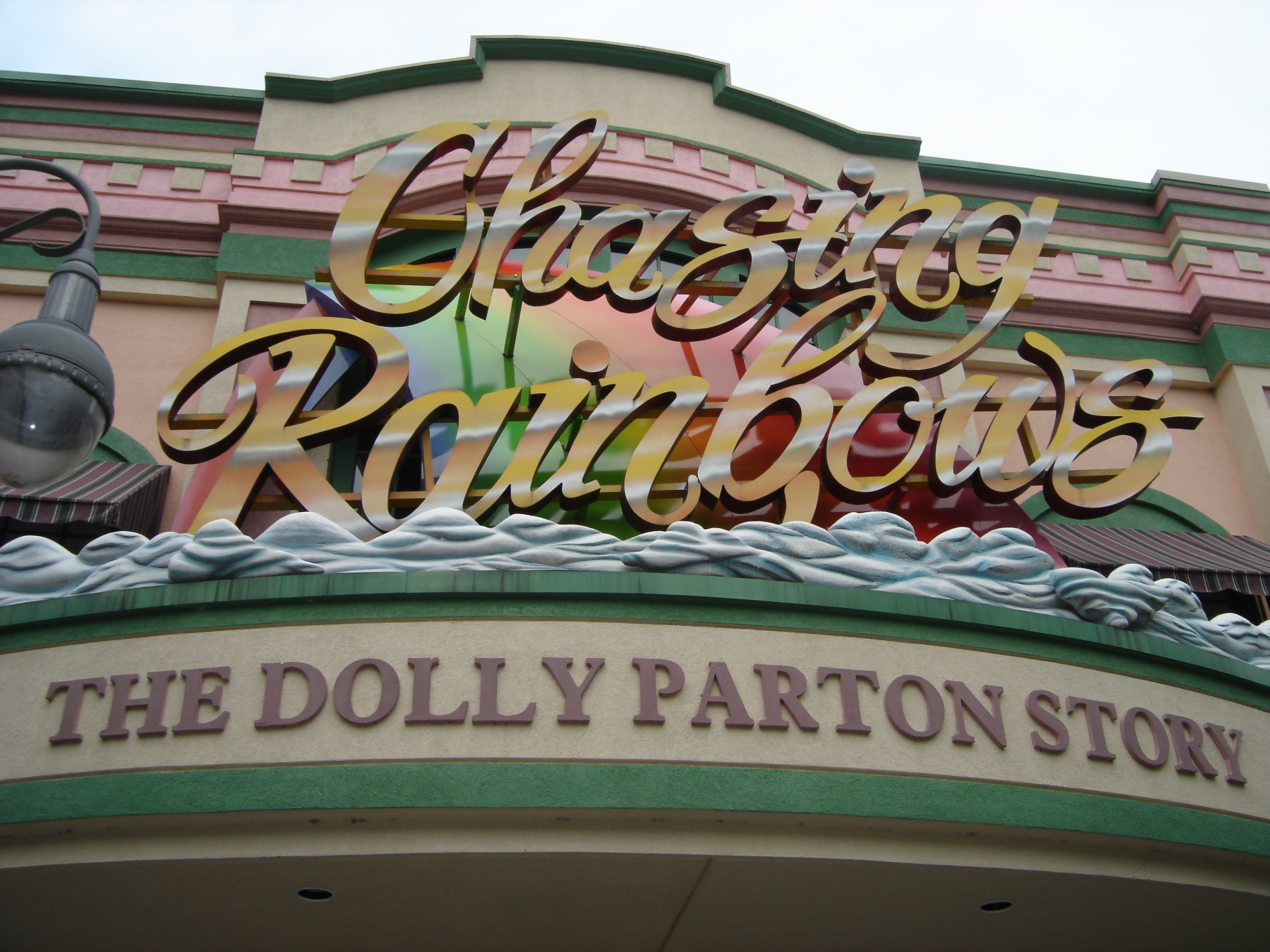
- Sign above entrance to Chasing Rainbows Museum.
- Established: 2002
- Dissolved: 2023
- Location: Dollywood, Pigeon Forge, Tennessee, United States
- Type: Biographical

The Chasing Rainbows Museum was a museum based on the country music singer Dolly Parton. It was located in the Dollywood theme park, Pigeon Forge, Tennessee, United States.

== History ==
Chasing Rainbows opened in 2002 as a part of the "Adventures in Imagination" area of Dollywood. The museum was in part designed by Dolly Parton's creative director, Steve Summers. The building was originally built in 1996 and opened as the Silver Screen Cafe and was converted to DJ Platters in 1997. Chasing Rainbows is the second museum for Parton at Dollywood. The original was Rags to Riches: The Dolly Parton Story, located over a pedestrian tunnel in Craftman's Valley.

The museum was home to artifacts from Parton's life, including the "Coat of Many Colors," Parton's high school band uniform, and her wedding gown and Carl Dean's wedding suit. A hologram of Parton in the exhibit explained the name of the museum: “I decided to call [the museum] ‘Chasing Rainbows’ because that’s exactly what I’ve been doing since the day I arrived on this good earth."

The museum closed at the end of the 2021 season to make way for the Dolly Parton Experience, which opened in 2024.

== Exhibits ==
Front door to Chasing Rainbows

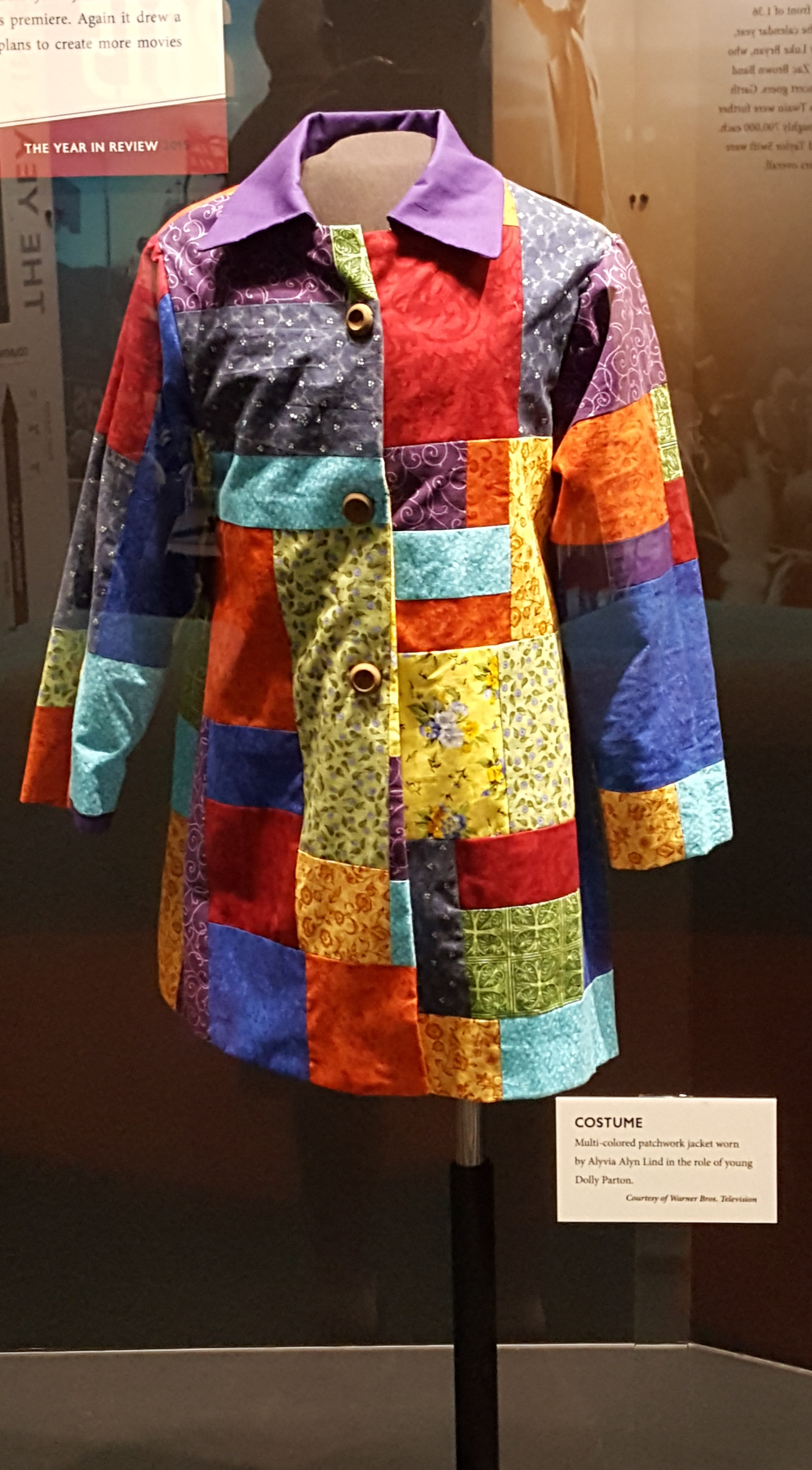
Recreated Coat of Many Colors from “Dolly Parton's Coat of Many Colors”

- Dolly's Friends - Several pictures of Parton with her celebrity friends including: Cher, Jane Fonda, Lily Tomlin, Carol Burnett, Johnny Cash, and others.
- Dolly's Attic - a showcase of Parton's personal items from her history. Some items are made by fans and displayed in the room. The room is designed to look like an attic. A video plays in the room of Parton telling stories about items in the room.
- Tennessee Mountain Home - A replica of a cabin like the one in which Parton grew up. This exhibit contains dolls like the one her father made for her as a child called "Little Tiny Tassletop," which was the influence for Parton's first song written.
- Coat of Many Colors - A replica of the coat that Parton's mother made for her is displayed, next to Porter Wagoner's laundry slip (on the back of which Parton wrote the song).
- School House - A one-room school house like Parton attended as a child. Objects on display include love letters written to Parton by a schoolmate, a photo of Parton in front of the United States Capitol her senior year, and her high school band uniform.
- Do You, Dolly... - A copy of Parton's wedding certificate as well as other pictures of her and her husband are displayed.
- The Porter Wagoner Show - Costumes belonging to Parton, Porter Wagoner, Speck Rhodes, and Don Warden are on display. Also on display are "Dolly Dolls" made by Ann Warden.
- Movies - Costumes from 9 to 5, The Best Little Whorehouse in Texas, Rhinestone, Steel Magnolias, and Straight Talk are displayed.
- Awards and Accomplishments - Parton's Academy of Country Music Awards, Grammys, Country Music Association, and other awards are on display in a two-story case.

== See also ==
- List of Dollywood attractions
- List of music museums
