= List of Dollywood entertainment =

The Showstreet Palace

Heartsong Theater during KidsFest

Pines Theater

This is a list of Dollywood entertainment shows and venues.

== Theaters ==
- Showstreet Palace - located in Showstreet.
- Pines Theatre - located in Jukebox Junction.
- DP's Celebrity Theatre - located in Showstreet.
- Backporch Theatre - located in Rivertown Junction.
- Valley Theatre - located in Craftsman's Valley.
- Wings of America Theatre - located in Craftman's Valley
- Heartsong Theater - located in The Village.
- Showstreet Gazebo - located in Showstreet.
- Dreamsong Theater - located in Adventures in Imagination.

== General shows ==
- Country Crossroads - A show that blends contemporary and traditional country music.
- Dreamland Drive-In - A show that takes the audience on a musical journey into the 1950s and 1960s.
- Gem Tones - Dollywood's doo-wop group.
- Heartsong - A film presented in a "nature-round" theater narrated by Dolly Parton herself.
- My People - A show featuring Dolly's brother Randy and sister Cassie as well as cousins, nieces and friends who tell the story of growing up with Dolly in the Smoky Mountains
- Kingdom Heirs - A showcase of Dollywood's own Southern gospel group.
- Professor Seymour Tricks Magic Show - A magic show.
- Smoky Mountain String Band - A bluegrass band.
- Wings of America Birds of Prey - Presented by the American Eagle Foundation, this show helps educate people about the American national bird, the bald eagle.
- Coat of Many Colours, The Little Engine That Could and Molly Lou Melon

== Festival of Nations shows ==
- Imaginé presented by La Grand Cirque
- Czech Pilsen Brass Band
- Keona
- Atahualpa
- Calpulli Danza Mexicana
- Dainava
- Royal Stiltwalkers of Merchtem Belgium
- Zambia Vocal Group

a new festival called great American summer with a fireworks display at the end of each day

== Smoky Mountain Christmas shows ==
- Dollywood's It's A Wonderful Life
- Christmas in the Smokies
- Appalachian Christmas
- Carol of the Trees
- Christmas with the Kingdom Heirs
- Dolly's Christmas Chapel
- O' Holy Night
- 'Twas the Night Before Christmas
- Victorian Melodies

Candlelight Carolers

== Master Craftsmen ==
- Blacksmith & Foundry- Custom ironworks
- Custom Glassworks- Glasswork made from crystal.
- Grist Mill- Authentic replica of 1880s grist mill including working water wheel. Sells goods from ground corn and flour such as cookies, biscuits, and baked goods. Arguably most known for the popular cinnamon bread snack.
- Valley Carriage Works- Handcrafted covered and buckboard wagons.
- Mountain Slate Works- Painted murals on pieces of slate tile.
- Rainbow Glass Factory- Hand-blown glass creations from molten glass.
- Smoky Creek Leather- Leather and tanning goods.
- Old Flames- Candles and wax creations.
- Sweet Shoppe- Handmade candy including taffy, brittle, ice cream, and fudge.
- Woodcarving Shop- Custom wood carved creations.

== Atmosphere Characters ==
- Apple Jack
- Miss Lillian
- Rainmaker
- Trapper & Baxter Bear
- Miss Penny & Patches the Scarecrow
- Cas & Walker
- Scrooge (Christmas)
- Flit and Flutter
- Benjamin Bear
- Vinny Vine (Halloween)
- Ma Hatfield
- The Mayor

== Past shows ==
- Silver Dollar Jamboree (1982–1985)
- Smoky Mountain Song (1990–1991)
- Dollywood Jamboree (1986–1993)
- Country Standard Time (1994)
- Movie Magic (1996)
- Back to the Country (1996)
- Fire on the Mountain (1992–1997)
- Paradise Road (1998–2001)
- Let the Good Times Roll (1995–2002)
- Backstage Pass (2002)
- Hometown Holidays (1994–2003)
- Christmas on Ice (2011–2012)
- Buddy Baxter's Bandstand USA (2003–2005)
- Dollywood's Babes In Toyland (2006–2010)
- Big Cats and Magic starring the Fercos Brothers (2006)
- Back Where I Come From (2005–2006)
- Untamed Illusions starring the Fercos Brothers (2007)
- Rhythm of the Dance (2007–2008)
- The Great American Country Show (2007–2008)
- Sha-Kon-O-Hey! Land of Blue Smoke (2009–2011)
- Naomi & the Wood Brothers
- Randy Parton (Various Shows)
- Lone Star Ramblers
- Country Treasures
- Sundown Hoe-Down
- Extreme Stunts
- Dollywood's Christmas Carol
