= Mystery Mine =

Steel roller coaster at Dollywood

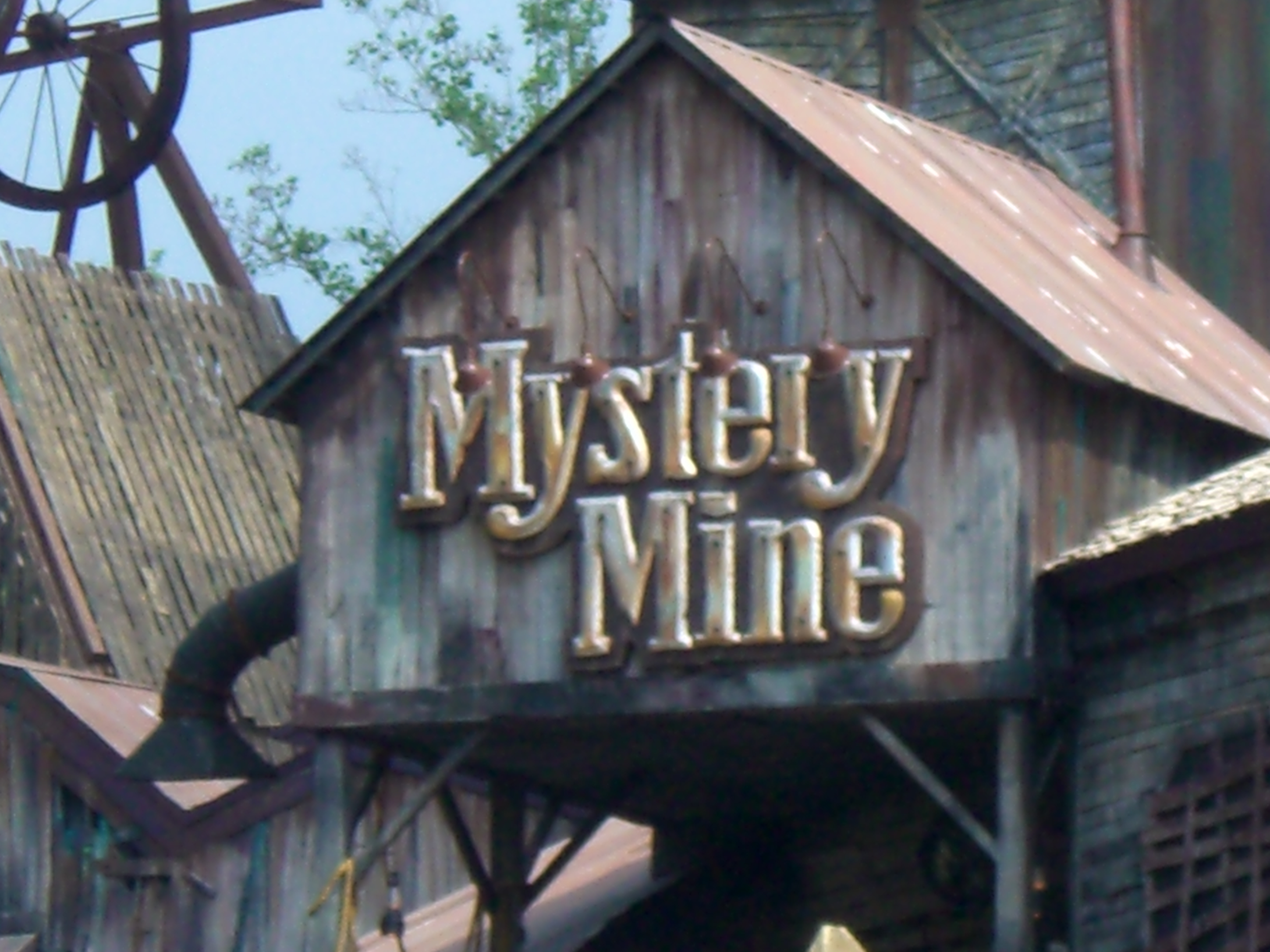
- Entrance to Mystery Mine

Dollywood
- Location: Dollywood
- Park section: Timber Canyon
- Coordinates: 35.795583°N 83.530059°W
- Status: Operating
- Soft opening date: March 31, 2007
- Opening date: April 13, 2007
- Cost: $17.5 million

General statistics
- Type: Steel – Euro-Fighter
- Manufacturer: Gerstlauer
- Designer: Werner Stengel
- Model: Euro-Fighter (Custom)
- Track layout: Terrain
- Lift/launch system: Two Chain lift hills
- Height: 85.3 ft (26.0 m)
- Length: 1,804.5 ft (550.0 m)
- Speed: 43.5 mph (70.0 km/h)
- Inversions: 2
- Duration: 2:30
- Max vertical angle: 95°
- Capacity: 1000 riders per hour
- Height restriction: 48–76 in (122–193 cm)
- Trains: 7 trains with a single car; riders arranged 4 across in 2 rows for a total of 8 riders per train
- TimeSaver Pass available
- Must transfer from wheelchair
- Mystery Mine at RCDB

Mystery Mine is a steel roller coaster located at Dollywood amusement park in Pigeon Forge, Tennessee. Manufactured by Gerstlauer, the Euro-Fighter model is heavily themed as a haunted mining operation from the 19th century. Opened in 2007, the roller coaster was Dollywood's largest single investment in the park's history at the time, costing $17.5 million to construct. A large portion of the track is located indoors, where the ride utilizes a series of special effects. It was the first Gerstlauer Euro-Fighter installation in the United States and had the steepest drop of any coaster in North America at the time of its opening. The ride was installed by Ride Entertainment Group, who handles all of Gerstlauer's operations in the Western Hemisphere.

== History ==
On July 7, 2006, Dollywood announced the addition of Mystery Mine for the 2007 season. The ride occupies a 1-acre (0.40 ha) expansion area of Timber Canyon near Thunderhead. According to Dollywood, Mystery Mine would feature state-of-the-art special effects, dark ride elements and mineshaft theming. For the ride system, the park hired Gerstlauer to build a custom variation of the Euro-Fighter coaster model — the first of its kind in the United States and the first to feature two vertical lift hills.

Mystery Mine officially opened on April 13, 2007. It was one of the two Gerstlauer Euro-Fighters to open that year, with the other being Rage at Adventure Island in Essex, England.

On March 9, 2021, photos were released which showed a change in the layout. Originally, the ride's first large drop was directly after the first block brake. The cars would pass under the first block brake, rise into a sharp vertical left U-turn, and then make a 270 degree right turn upwards into the second block brake. After the modifications, the ride now makes a 90 degree left turn before its first large drop, which leads directly into a 180-degree right turn into the second block brake." This new first drop has a trim brake and the former U-turn still remains unused. The rest of the layout remains the same, including the second half of the first outdoor portion and the climactic 95-degree drop and inversions. Mystery Mine became one of Dollywood's two roller coasters to receive new track in 2021, with the other being Lightning Rod.

== Ride experience ==
The ride's story and themes are introduced in the queue as guests enter. Visitors pass old newspaper articles and signs condemning an old abandoned mine shaft, and the queue winds around a rocky area before climbing stairs to the boarding area. During this time, guests occasionally hear recorded audio stating, "If the canary ain't tweetin'...you'll be sleepin'!" Quick-paced banjo music can also be heard playing in the background.

After boarding, the 8-passenger car launches quickly out of the station. A miner's evil laugh echoes down the first small drop as the car rushes toward the first curve. A wall of cawing crows and a caged canary watch the car as it passes. After turning the corner, passengers come face to face with a giant spinning rock crusher. The cart quickly drops beneath the grinder and whips around a hairpin curve. As the car slows to a stop, a crow caws loudly from somewhere above and a small lever labeled "mine gas" cranks into the on position.

The car ascends up a vertical wall of track at a 90-degree angle. Graffiti litters the sheet metal walls on both sides. After reaching the top, the car drops down a short hill outside the ride building. A sign advertises "Burnt out bridge ahead!", and the car swerves across the trestle. Prior to 2021, a steep drop sent the vehicle careening up a vertical U-turn, although this turn was removed from the layout prior to the 2021 season. The car proceeds to swing around a few small helices before plunging back into the abandoned mine building, where it slows down. A spotlight turns on illuminating the canary cage seen earlier. A lightning special effect flashes from the shaft ahead, as the canary turns over on its perch, to indicate it died. The car begins to ascend the mine shaft as crows peer out from behind the broken boards surrounding the shaft. A window effect above riders shows the storm going on outside the shaft. Another flash of lightning strikes the top of the simulated tower protruding above, which collapses onto the window.

Now in darkness, the car stops at the peak of the hill. A lit fuse is heard in the distance and soon becomes visible, snaking along both sides of the car. A green lantern suddenly illuminates, sitting on top of a mound of dynamite in boxes, hooked to the quickly approaching fuse. As the lit portion reaches the dynamite, simulated flames shoot out as the car drops at a beyond-vertical drop of 95 degrees, passing the on-ride camera and into a barrel roll followed by a twist and half loop. The car enters the final brake run and returns to the station.

== Accidents ==
On July 11, 2020, three park guests were walking on a pathway that trails underneath a bridged part of the ride when a decorative chain gave way and fell on top of them. One of the guests suffered from a laceration on her forehead and injured her arm, the other woman was also taken to a hospital in an unknown condition, and the third person was treated at the park.

== Awards ==
- On July 2, 2007, Theme Park Insider awarded Mystery Mine its "Best New Theme Park Attraction" award for 2007.
- Mystery Mine was ranked 48th on the Amusement Today Top 50 Best Steel Coasters list for 2007.
- Amusement Today ranked Mystery Mine as the #2 new ride for 2007, behind Cedar Point's Maverick.

== Ride Elements ==
- Two vertical lifts
- 95 degree drop
- Heartline roll
- Turn-over loop

== Gallery ==
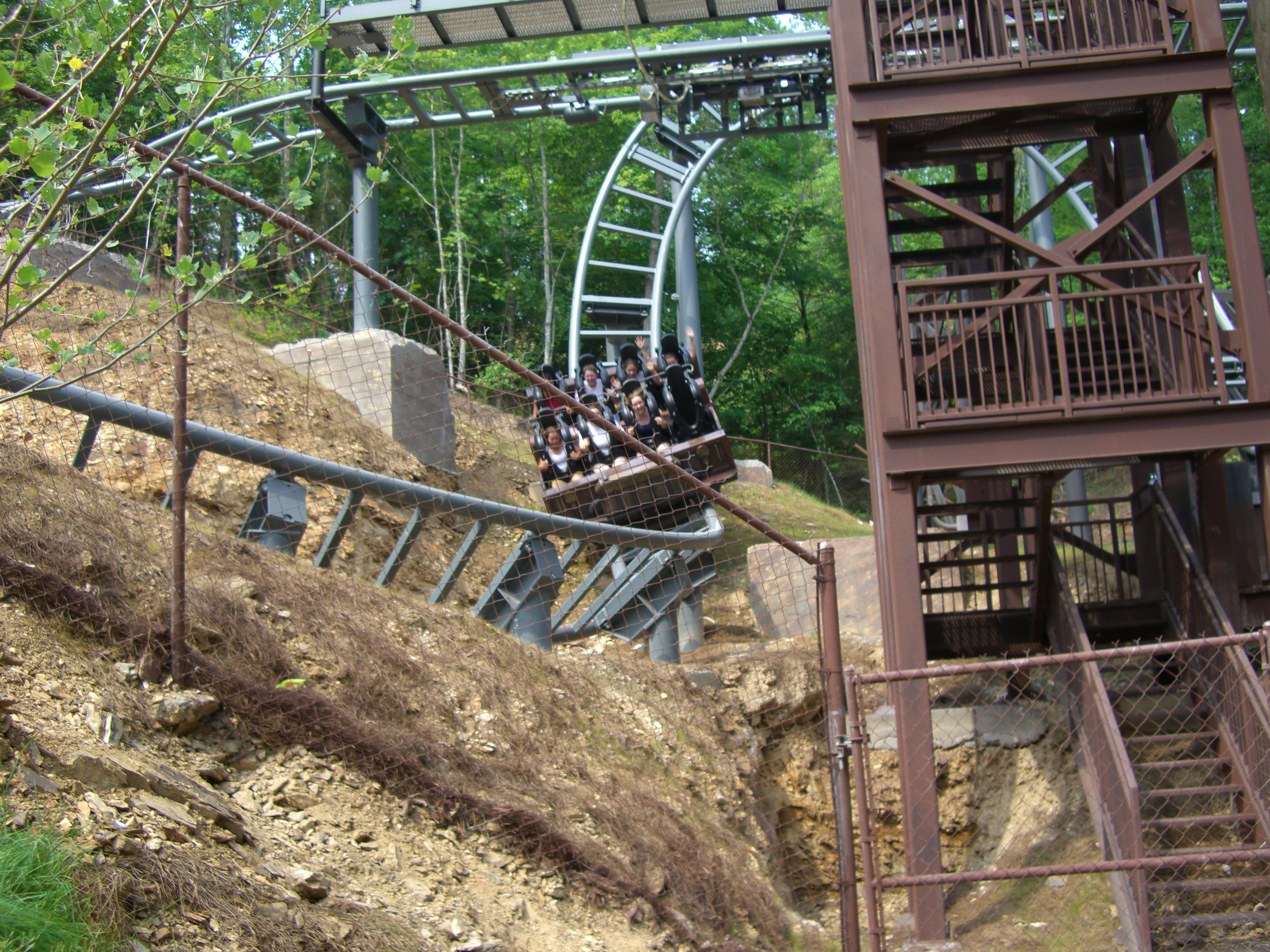
Part of Mystery Mine's back section, preceding the 95 degree drop. The car is exiting the U-turn that was removed prior to the 2021 season.

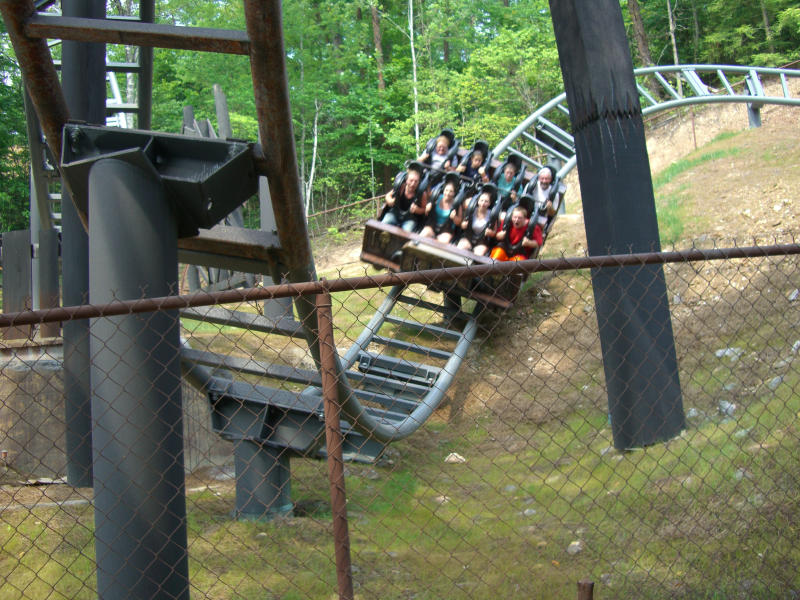
More of Mystery Mine's back section, preceding the 95 degree drop

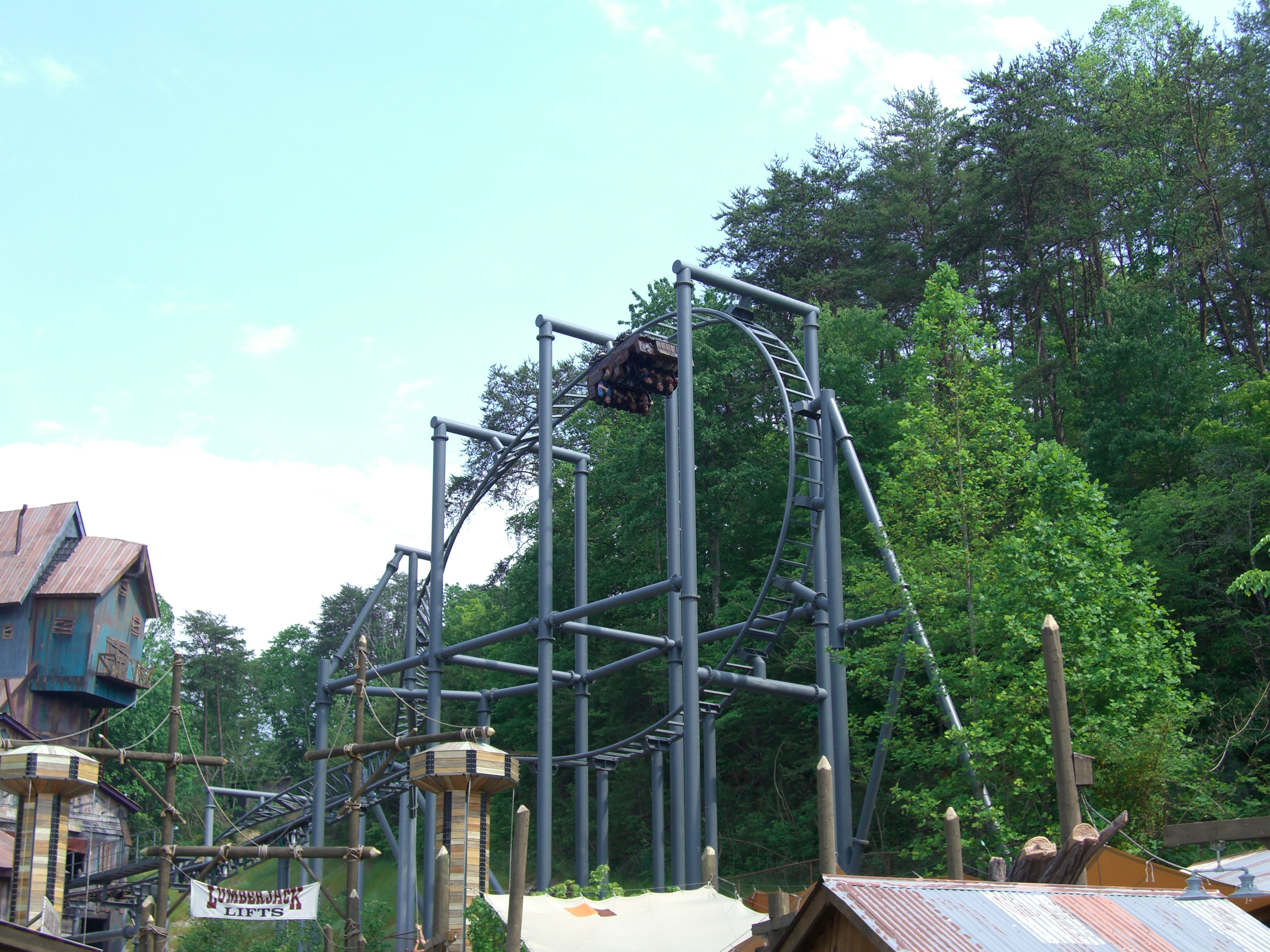
Mystery Mine's finale
