= River Battle =

Defunct water ride at Dollywood

- River Battle entrance

Dollywood
- Area: Wilderness Pass
- Status: Removed
- Cost: US$5 million
- Opening date: March 21, 2008 (17 years ago)
- Closing date: September 4, 2017

General statistics
- Manufacturer: Mack Rides
- Model: Splash Battle, interactive boat ride
- Length: 500 ft (150 m)
- Capacity: 800 riders per hour
- Boats: 8 boats. Riders are arranged 4 across in 2 rows for a total of 8 riders per boat.
- Virtual queue: TimeSaver Pass was available
- Wheelchair accessible

River Battle was a Splash Battle, an interactive water raft ride at Dollywood in Pigeon Forge, Tennessee. It was located behind the Mystery Mine roller coaster in the Wilderness Pass section. It opened on March 21, 2008. In 2017, it was announced that it would be removed. Its last day of operation was September 4, 2017.

== History ==
In July 2007, Dollywood announced the addition of River Battle for the following year. The project also included a 750-foot (230 m) walkway called Wilderness Pass to provide a direct route between Craftsman's Valley and Timber Canyon. The ride officially opened on March 21, 2008.

== Ride ==
River Battle was the fourth Interactive Boat Rides developed by German firm, Mack Rides. Similar rides, known as Splash Battles, were previously built by 3DBA. Riders boarded one of eight boats which each seated 8 passengers and slowly floated around a 500-foot (150 m) course. They had to shoot at the other boats and more than 100 targets along their way. The ride boasted an hourly capacity of 800 passengers.

== See also ==
- Battle Boats, a similar ride at Sea World on the Gold Coast, Australia
