= FireChaser Express =

Steel roller coaster at Dollywood

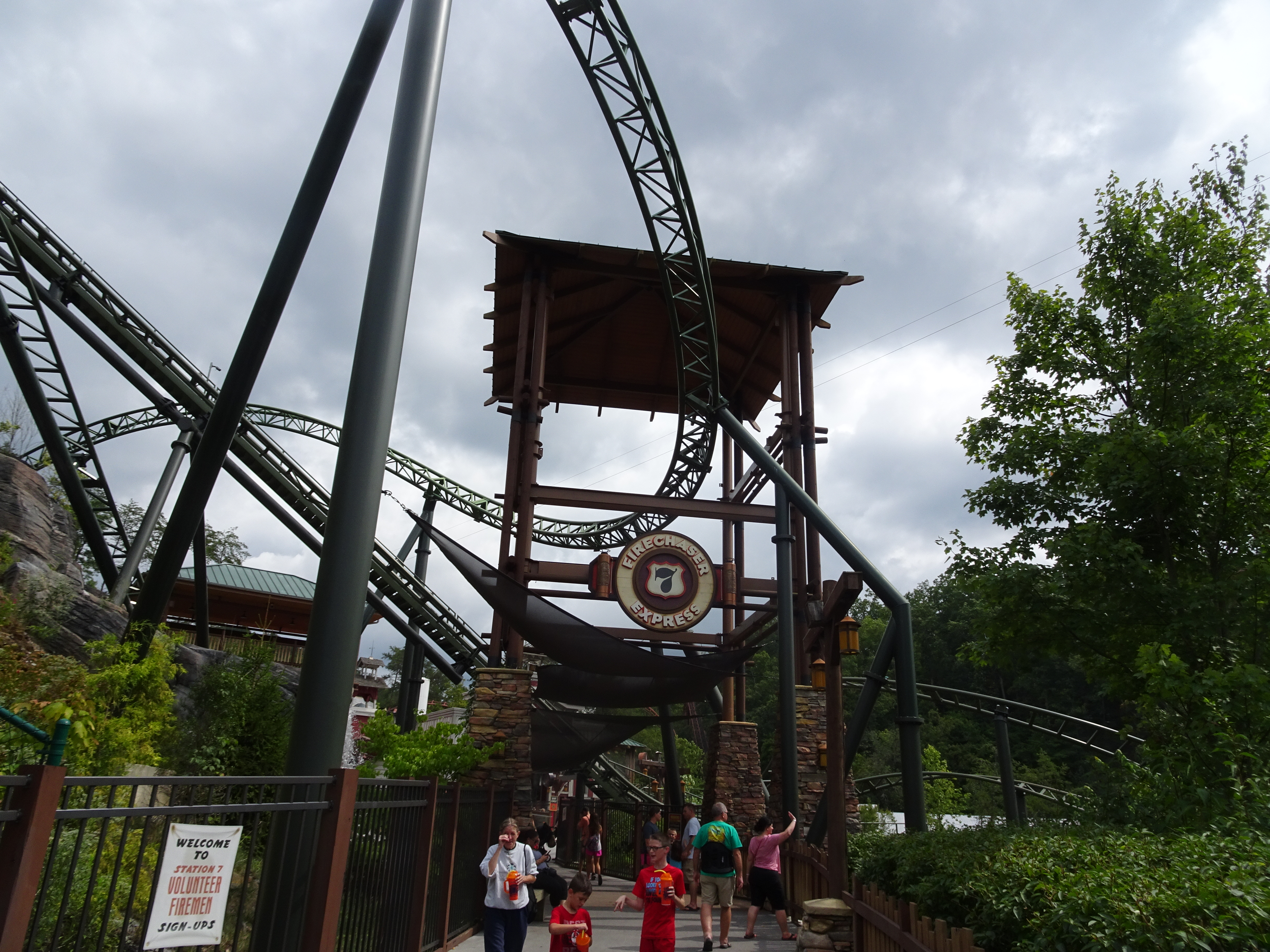

Dollywood
- Location: Dollywood
- Park section: Wilderness Pass
- Coordinates: 35.7947°N 83.5301°W
- Status: Operating
- Opening date: March 22, 2014
- Cost: $15 million
- Replaced: Adventure Mountain

General statistics
- Type: Steel – Family – Launched
- Manufacturer: Gerstlauer
- Model: Custom
- Lift/launch system: Tire propelled launch, Chain lift hill
- Height: 78 ft (24 m)
- Length: 2,427 ft (740 m)
- Speed: 34.5 mph (55.5 km/h)
- Inversions: 0
- Duration: 2:19
- Capacity: 750 riders per hour
- Acceleration: 0 to 16 mph (26 km/h) in 1.1 secs 0 to 20 mph (32 km/h) in 2 secs
- Height restriction: 39 in (99 cm)
- Trains: 3 trains with 7 cars; riders arranged 2 across in a single row for a total of 14 riders per train
- FireChaser Express at RCDB

FireChaser Express is a family launched roller coaster located at the Dollywood amusement park in Pigeon Forge, Tennessee, United States. The ride's revealing was part of a large announcement made on August 21, 2013. The roller coaster opened on March 22, 2014.

== History ==
On December 9, 2012, Dollywood announced that their Adventure Mountain ropes course would not reopen for the 2013 season. On opening day, the structure remained, but was carefully dismantled in preparation for a new-for-2014 attraction.

In the summer of 2013, ground clearance began for the new attraction. A sign was erected near the site with the words "Coming in 2014: The next big adventure... It'll be a blast!"

A trademark for the name "FireChaser Express" was filed on August 8, 2013. The attraction was officially announced in the morning of August 21. The ride will be installed by Ride Entertainment Group, who handles all of Gerstlauer's operations in the Western Hemisphere.

Dollywood revealed more details about FireChaser Express in October 2013. The ride was designed with two tire propelled launches, a 79-foot (24 m) lift hill, two helices, six airtime moments, and a 100-foot (30 m) long trick-track section. There are also themed elements, such as fire towers, crashed rockets, a destroyed fireworks storage shed, fallen telephone poles with rocket darts, and other charred remnants that litter the coaster's path. The ride's climax was designed to feature a show scene with fire effects and fireworks, as well as a backwards launch.

FireChaser Express opened to the general public on March 22, 2014.

== Story ==
The ride is themed around the fictional Volunteer Fire Station 7 and its fire chief, Pete Embers. Pete is a man of considerable patience and he's always more than happy to let sleeping dogs lie, except when the beautiful Great Smoky Mountains and their forests are endangered. Lately, he's had to deal with local businessman and eccentric fireworks enthusiast "Crazy" Charlie Cherribaum and his Gas Station and Fireworks Emporium. Because of an increase in dry lightning in the area, Charlie has taken to calling Fire Station 7 on a daily basis, asking them to come out whenever he sees the slightest hint of smoke. To deal with Charlie while leaving his regular volunteers available to deal with real emergencies, Chief Embers has recently decided to deputize almost everyone in town to keep an eye on Charlie and his latest creation, the Big Bertha firecracker, which is rumored (by Charlie) to be the most powerful firecracker anybody in town has ever seen; this claim has driven Pete over the edge, and now he's looking for any excuse to have Charlie and his business shut down.

== Ride ==
FireChaser Express' theme is based on the several volunteer-based fire departments surrounding the Great Smoky Mountains National Park in the 1940s. After a brief message from Fire Chief Embers, the station's siren goes off as the "truck" launches out of the station and navigates a few curves before hitting the chain lift. The ride proceeds into a small curve drop into another curve then a drop into several camelbacks. After the camelbacks the train goes through a tower and navigates through Crazy Charlie's fireworks testing range before hitting an s-bend and entering Charlie Cherribaum's Gasoline and Fireworks Emporium, through the storage warehouse. Charlie panics, saying he sees smoke, but then dismisses it as a result of his paranoia as a spark ignites a box of firecrackers and a few tanks of gas. The fire catches Charlie by surprise, and he tells the volunteers (riders) to watch out for Big Bertha and to leave the building; as he says this, a large firecracker labeled "Big Bertha" falls into a position where it points directly at the train, and the fire ignites the fuse, which begins to throw sparks. As the fireworks start to go off, the room fills with smoke and a series of loud bangs are heard as the train accelerates backwards onto a different track, where it navigates a few more turns and passes underneath another fire tower before hitting the final brake run. Fire Chief Embers praises the work of the volunteers as the train in the station is launched. The track switches again as the train backs into the station, where riders unload and exit the station. The track length is 2,427 feet (740 m).

== Accidents ==
- On April 23, 2019, 40 passengers were stranded for 20 minutes when the safety sensor tripped.
