= Barnstormer (ride) =

Ride at Dollywood

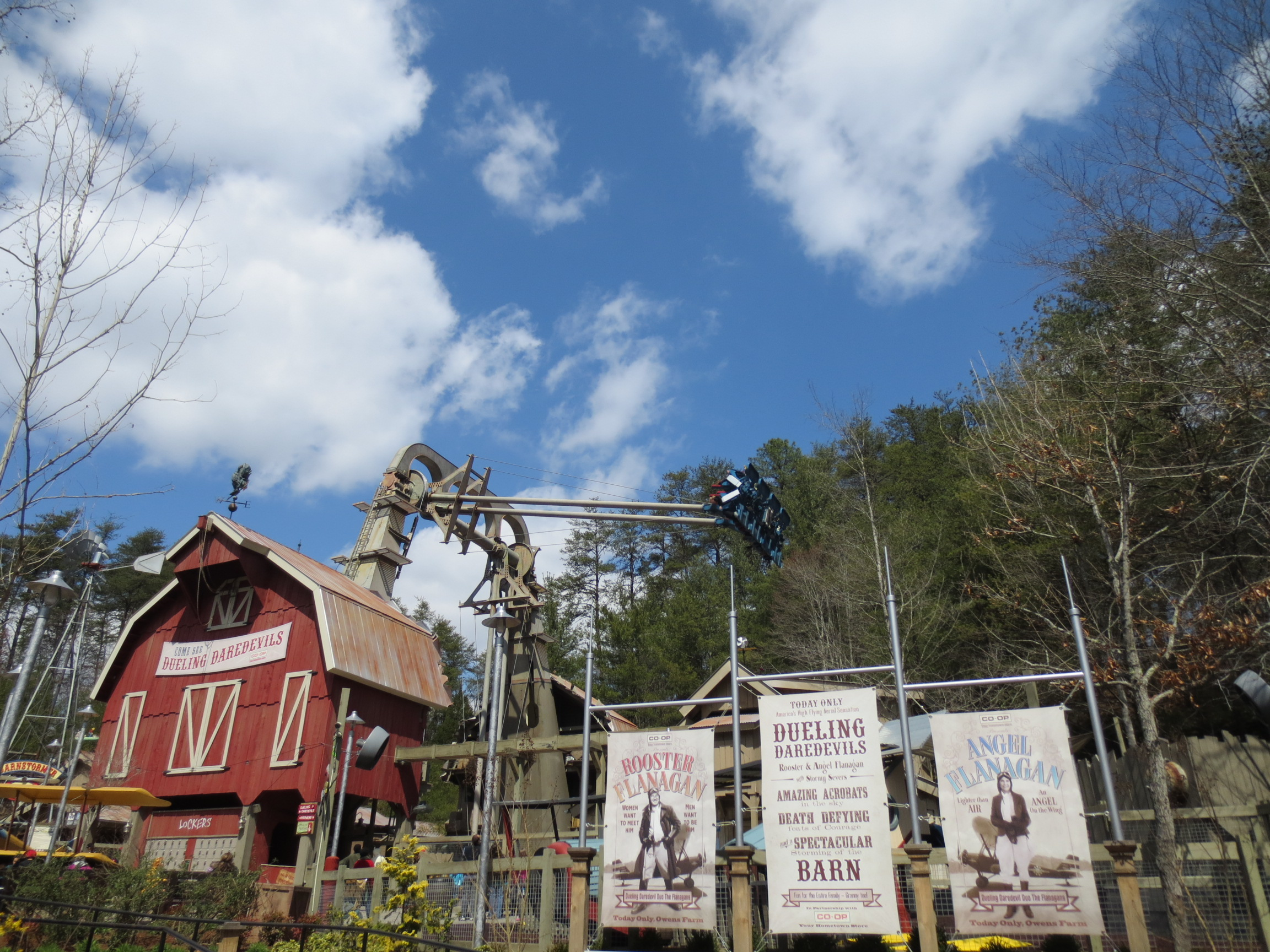

Dollywood
- Area: Owen's Farm
- Coordinates: 35.7941781°N 83.5337981°W
- Status: Operating
- Opening date: March 28, 2011 (13 years ago)

Ride statistics
- Manufacturer: S&S Worldwide
- Model: Screamin' Swing
- Drop: 81 ft (25 m)
- Speed: 45 mph (72 km/h)
- Capacity: 450 riders per hour
- Vehicles: 2
- Riders per vehicle: 16
- Rows: 2
- Riders per row: 8
- Duration: 1 minute
- Height restriction: 48 in (122 cm)
- Restraints: Lap bar
- Virtual queue: TimeSaver Pass available
- Must transfer from wheelchair

Barnstormer is a thrill ride at Dollywood in Pigeon Forge, TN. It is located in Owen's Farm section of the park. It opened on March 28, 2011. It cost $5.5 million and was Dollywood's first S&S Worldwide amusement ride.

The ride was made famous in June 2012 by a viral YouTube video of a father and daughter riding a similar ride twice. The video was featured on national media outlets including the Huffington Post.

== Specifications ==
Barnstormer is a Screamin' Swing type ride built by S&S Worldwide, and installed by Ride Entertainment Group. It consists of two swinging arms, seating 16 riders per arm (32 total). At full swing, the arms reach 81 feet (25 m) off the ground and achieve a maximum velocity of 45 miles per hour (72 km/h). Each arm is capable of 230 degrees of rotation. Riders must be 48 in (120 cm) or taller, and are restrained by a lap bar.
