= Lightning Rod (roller coaster) =

Hybrid roller coaster at Dollywood

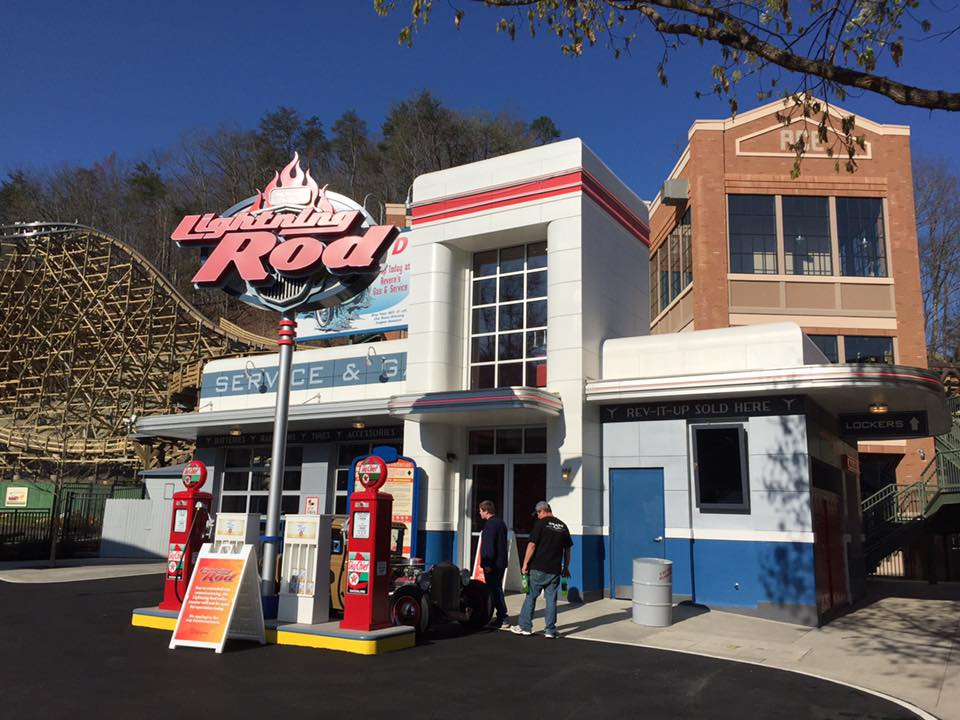
- Lightning Rod main entrance

Dollywood
- Location: Dollywood
- Park section: Jukebox Junction
- Coordinates: 35.8058°N 83.5289°W
- Status: Operating
- Opening date: June 13, 2016
- Cost: $22 million

General statistics
- Type: Steel
- Manufacturer: Rocky Mountain Construction
- Designer: Alan Schilke
- Model: Topper Track
- Track layout: Terrain
- Lift/launch system: Chain lift hill
- Drop: 165 ft (50 m)
- Length: 3,800 ft (1,200 m)
- Speed: 73 mph (117 km/h)
- Inversions: 0
- Duration: 3:12
- Max vertical angle: 73°
- G-force: 3.5
- Height restriction: 48 in (122 cm)
- Trains: 2 trains with 6 cars; riders arranged 2 across in 2 rows for a total of 24 riders per train
- Single rider line available
- Lightning Rod at RCDB

Lightning Rod is a hybrid roller coaster located at Dollywood theme park in Pigeon Forge, Tennessee. Manufactured by Rocky Mountain Construction (RMC), the ride is themed to hot rod cars from the 1950s and opened to the public on June 13, 2016. Initially marketed as the first launched wooden roller coaster of its kind, Lightning Rod was later modified for the 2021 season, with over half of its wooden Topper Track being replaced with RMC's steel I-Box track. Prior to the conversion to steel, Lightning Rod was considered the fastest wooden coaster in the world reaching a maximum speed of 73 mph (117 km/h).

Dollywood originally planned for the ride to open at the beginning of the 2016 season, but it was delayed due to a problem with its magnetic launch system. Lightning Rod operated in limited capacity for much of its inaugural season and has been plagued with issues over the years that led to frequent closures. For the 2024 season, the trains were replaced, and the launch system was removed in favor of a high-speed chain lift to improve reliability.

== History ==
=== Construction ===
Planning for a new roller coaster at Dollywood park (in Pigeon Forge, Tennessee) began in 2014; park officials selected a hilly, wooded site for the construction of a new roller coaster. This rugged section of terrain was to be a key factor in the coaster’s unique layout and ride experience. Dolly Parton herself publicly announced the plans for the roller coaster during a press conference on August 7, 2015. Upon Mrs. Parton’s announcement and confirmation, this ride (estimated to cost $22 million) was slated to be the largest investment, on any one attraction, in Dollywood's history. The project was just one part of a multi-year, $300-million park expansion, which was initiated in 2013. The park hired Rocky Mountain Construction (RMC) to design and manufacture the new coaster.

Construction of Lightning Rod commenced in May 2015, when workers began laying footers for the ride. Plans focused on revitalizing the Jukebox Junction area of the park (open since 1995), with Lightning Rod as its primary attraction. The area would maintain its 1950s theming, with the entire section showcasing a design aesthetic unique to that era within the Sevierville and East Tennessee region. The project included interior renovations and an outdoor seating area at Red's Diner; a hot rod-themed retail store called Hi Octane; a chicken sandwich truck; and an airstream trailer selling Dippin' Dots ice cream.

Ahead of Lightning Rod's opening, Mayfield Dairy released a co-branded ice cream flavor called "Smoky Mountain Fudge", advertising the coaster. On February 3, 2016, Dollywood invited press members to preview Lightning Rod. Lightning Rod was scheduled to open with the park on March 15, 2016, but the opening was postponed. On March 24, 2016, Fred Grubb (of RMC) said that the roller coaster's magnetic launch system (developed by Pennsylvania-based Velocity Magnetics) would not be able to “perform at the level required” for proper operation. Mr. Grubb did not elaborate any further on the nature of the problem, nor did he offer an estimate or a timeline for the delay.

=== Operation ===
Lightning Rod opened occasionally for "technical rehearsals", where select guests could experience the ride. It officially opened to the public on June 13, 2016. After several days of operation, Dollywood closed Lightning Rod on June 18, 2016. The closure was necessitated because RMC had recalled a part used in several of its rides, including Lighting Rod. The ride reopened in limited capacity on June 22, 2016. Park officials later clarified that the ride was operating in "technical rehearsal" status, meaning it would close periodically for maintenance. On September 5, 2016, Dollywood announced that the ride was again fully operational.

By 2017, the ride had gained a reputation for unreliability, although local news station WBIR-TV disputed this, saying: "It is not true that the ride is down more often than not." Lightning Rod closed in early July 2018 and did not reopen until October 10, 2018. The park did not specify the reason for the closure, but Director of Public Relations Pete Owens stated it was not related to the launch. After it reopened, guests noticed changes to the lead car of each train as well as new wood along portions of the ride's structure.

In late September 2020, Lightning Rod closed again, this time for the remainder of the season. Rocky Mountain Construction began work to make major unspecified modifications to the attraction. Park officials subsequently confirmed that a portion of Lightning Rod's wooden Topper Track was being replaced with steel I-Box Track, making the coaster a hybrid of wood and steel. The trains had put too much stress on the wooden track in several sections, including the launch. It reopened with the rest of the park in March 2021. RCDB updated the roller coaster's classification from wood to steel, reporting that 57 percent of the track had been converted. In September 2023, Dollywood announced another extended closure beginning at the end of the month to replace the ride's launch system with a chain lift hill, and to replace the trains. The changes were intended to improve overall reliability and ride experience, and the park clarified that the ride would retain its maximum speed of 73 mph (117 km/h).

== Ride experience ==
=== Queue ===
Guests enter Johnny Rev's garage, where the queue takes place. In the first area, guests pass by several tires, trophies, equipment and a full-scale model of a hot rod. Heading outside, there is a sign with the phone number on Randy's Repair Shop, resembling the Dollywood hours and information phone line. After winding through the outdoor area, guests enter a three-story research building, which contains a lot of the behind the scenes top secret information. The next area resembles a custom hot rod shop. There are two green doors that show a welding room. This room also features a chalkboard, blueprints and more tools. After climbing the stairs, guests reach another area. Here, Rev's private tinkering and hot rod design space can be seen. The Lightning Rod mural is also spotted. Then, guests reach the last area, which is the loading station. There are numerous boxes and crates that are casually tucked into various nooks and crannies in this area. Guests select a row and board the train.

=== Layout ===
The train makes a right-hand turn as it departs the station and climbs the initial chain lift hill. It originally launched up the first hill, accelerating from zero to 45 mph (72 km/h). The train drops a short length into a dip that leads into the tallest hill of the ride. After cresting the second hill, the train drops 165 feet and reaches a maximum speed of 73 mph (117 km/h). A climb to the left follows, and the train enters the first of several steeply banked turns. It then rises to the right, snaps to the left, and then back to the right once more. This is followed by a right-hand turn, another snap-left-then-right sequence, and a double-up climb. The train then descends through a sequence of four consecutive drops and a sharp bank to the right as it passes near the station. The finale is a final uphill, 180-degree turn to the right that finishes with a short drop into the final brake run.

== Characteristics ==
Upon opening, Lightning Rod became the first wooden roller coaster in the world to use a launch system instead of a traditional chain lift hill. Featuring a peak speed of 73 mph (117 km/h), it also became the world's fastest wooden coaster, surpassing Goliath at Six Flags Great America. The linear synchronous motors were powered by a large bank of capacitors located in the main building. This system would require 1,500 horsepower (1.1 megawatts) to catapult each train. Although the ride has a maximum height of 206 feet (63 m), the crest of the lift hill is 80 feet (24 m). However, on the 12th September 2023, It was announced that Lightning Rod would close to have the launch replaced with a high-speed chain lift hill. It reopened on the 8th March, 2024.

The ride originally used RMC's Topper Track technology, which consists of continuously welded metal plates that cover the wooden track. According to Pete Owens, Lightning Rod was constructed in the same way as the park's other wooden coaster, Thunderhead, except that Lightning Rod also "has a continuously welded tubular steel track for a better ride". The use of Topper Track also allowed the ride to contain overbanked turns, which could not be used on many traditional wooden coasters due to structural limitations. Much of the Topper Track was replaced with I-Box track prior to the 2021 season.

Lightning Rod's trains are themed to hot rod cars from the 1950s. According to the Los Angeles Times, the theming on each train includes an "injector scoop, header pipes and a flame paint job". Each train has six cars, with each car seating four people (two rows of two riders), for a total capacity of 24 riders per train. The wheels on Lightning Rod's trains are made of urethane instead of steel. This was intended to allow a quieter and smoother ride experience.

== Awards ==
Lightning Rod received the Golden Ticket Award for Best New Ride in 2016. The website coaster101.com gave the ride its "Coaster of the Decade Award" in 2019. In addition, every year from 2016 to 2019, Amusement Today magazine's Golden Ticket Awards ranked Lightning Rod among the world's top 50 wooden coasters. Amusement Today began classifying Lightning Rod as a steel coaster in 2021, when the ride was ranked among the world's top 50 steel coasters.

Golden Ticket Awards: Top wood Roller Coasters
Year									1998	1999
Ranking									–	–
Year	2000	2001	2002	2003	2004	2005	2006	2007	2008	2009
Ranking	–	–	–	–	–	–	–	–	–	–
Year	2010	2011	2012	2013	2014	2015	2016	2017	2018	2019
Ranking	–	–	–	–	–	–	11	5	6	7
Year	2020	2021	2022	2023	2024	2025	2026			
Ranking	N/A	–	–	–	–	–	–			

Golden Ticket Awards: Top steel Roller Coasters
Year									1998	1999
Ranking									–	–
Year	2000	2001	2002	2003	2004	2005	2006	2007	2008	2009
Ranking	–	–	–	–	–	–	–	–	–	–
Year	2010	2011	2012	2013	2014	2015	2016	2017	2018	2019
Ranking	–	–	–	–	–	–	–	–	–	–
Year	2020	2021	2022	2023	2024	2025	2026			
Ranking	N/A	7	11	14	22 (tie)	31	39			

== Accidents ==
- On June 13, 2016, after grand opening, the coaster was shut down temporarily due to a nation-wide mechanical recall.
