= Big Bear Mountain (roller coaster) =

Launch coaster at Dollywood

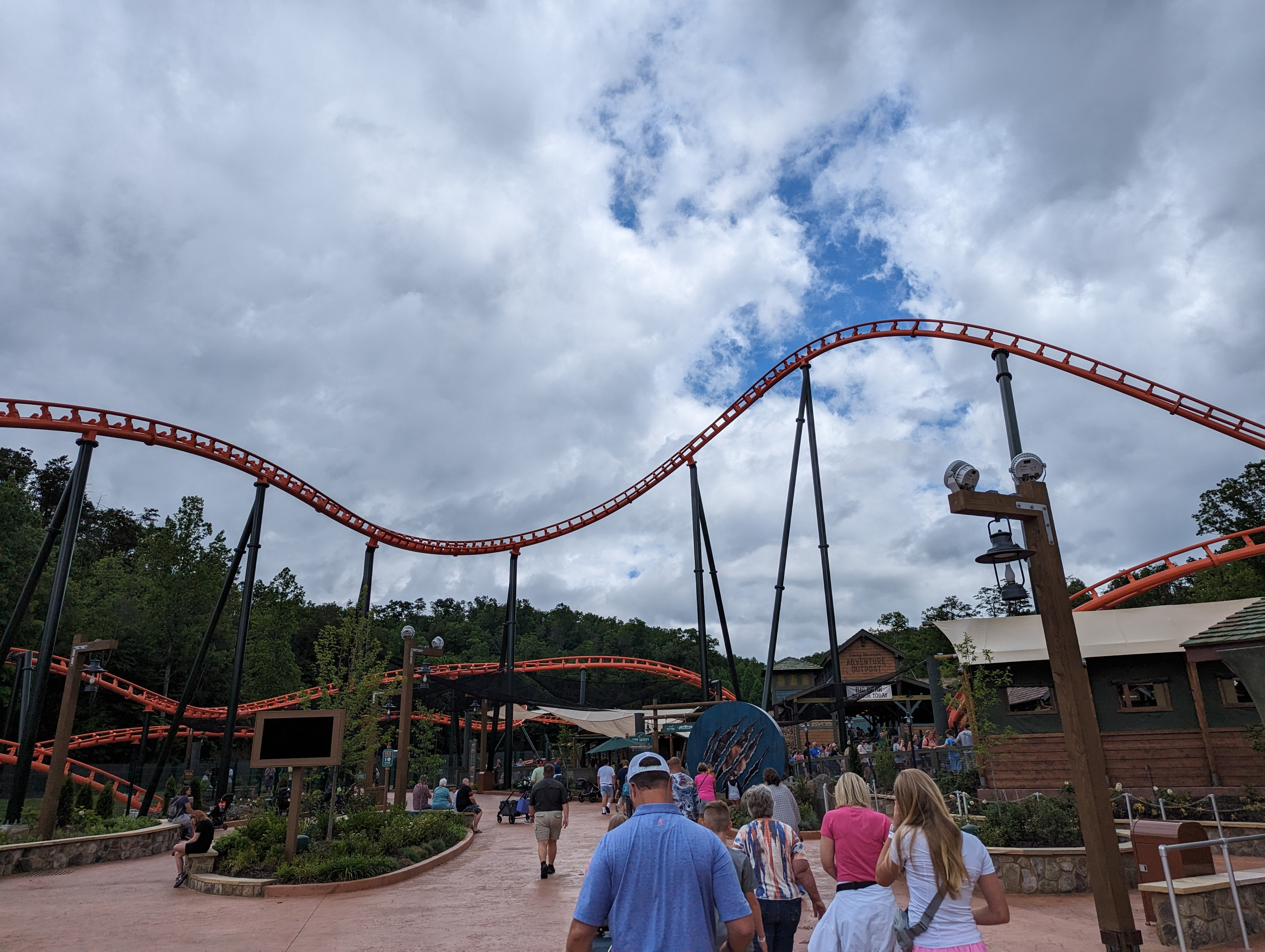

Dollywood
- Location: Dollywood
- Park section: Wildwood Grove
- Coordinates: 35.7987°N 83.5300°W
- Status: Operating
- Opening date: May 12, 2023
- Cost: $25 million

General statistics
- Type: Steel – Launched
- Manufacturer: Vekoma
- Lift/launch system: LIM launch
- Height: 66 ft (20 m)
- Length: 3,990 ft (1,220 m)
- Speed: 48 mph (77 km/h)
- Inversions: 0
- Height restriction: 39 in (99 cm)
- Trains: 10 cars; riders arranged 2 across in a single row for a total of 20 riders per train
- Website: Official website
- Big Bear Mountain at RCDB

Big Bear Mountain is a launching steel roller coaster located at Dollywood in Pigeon Forge, Tennessee, United States. Manufactured by Vekoma, the roller coaster opened on May 12, 2023, and is the longest in the park featuring a length of 3,990 feet (1,220 m).

== History ==
On August 5, 2022, Dolly Parton and Dollywood officially announced the US$25 million roller coaster named Big Bear Mountain for the Wildwood Grove section of the theme park with a planned opening of spring 2023. Track for the attraction arrived the following month in September, and trains for the attraction were officially unveiled at the International Association of Amusement Parks and Attractions (IAAPA) Expo on November 15, 2022. Big Bear Mountain opened on May 12, 2023.

== Characteristics ==
The steel track for Big Bear Mountain encompasses 6 acres (2.4 ha) of land, with the track length totaling 3,990 feet (1,220 m), the longest in Dollywood, and the height of the roller coaster is 66 feet (20 m). The color of the track is orange with green supports. There are 23 airtime hills throughout the course.

The theme for the ride is based on the legend of a black bear named Big Bear roaming Wildwood Grove that has never been seen. Ned Oakley, who is an explorer, is tasked to finding Big Bear and brings riders along in an SUV. The ride has a minimum height requirement of 39 inches (990 mm).

== Rankings ==
Golden Ticket Awards: Top steel Roller Coasters
Year									1998	1999
Ranking									–	–
Year	2000	2001	2002	2003	2004	2005	2006	2007	2008	2009
Ranking	–	–	–	–	–	–	–	–	–	–
Year	2010	2011	2012	2013	2014	2015	2016	2017	2018	2019
Ranking	–	–	–	–	–	–	–	–	–	–
Year	2020	2021	2022	2023	2024	2025	2026			
Ranking	N/A	–	–	37	32	37	40 (tie)			
