= Daredevil Falls =

Water ride

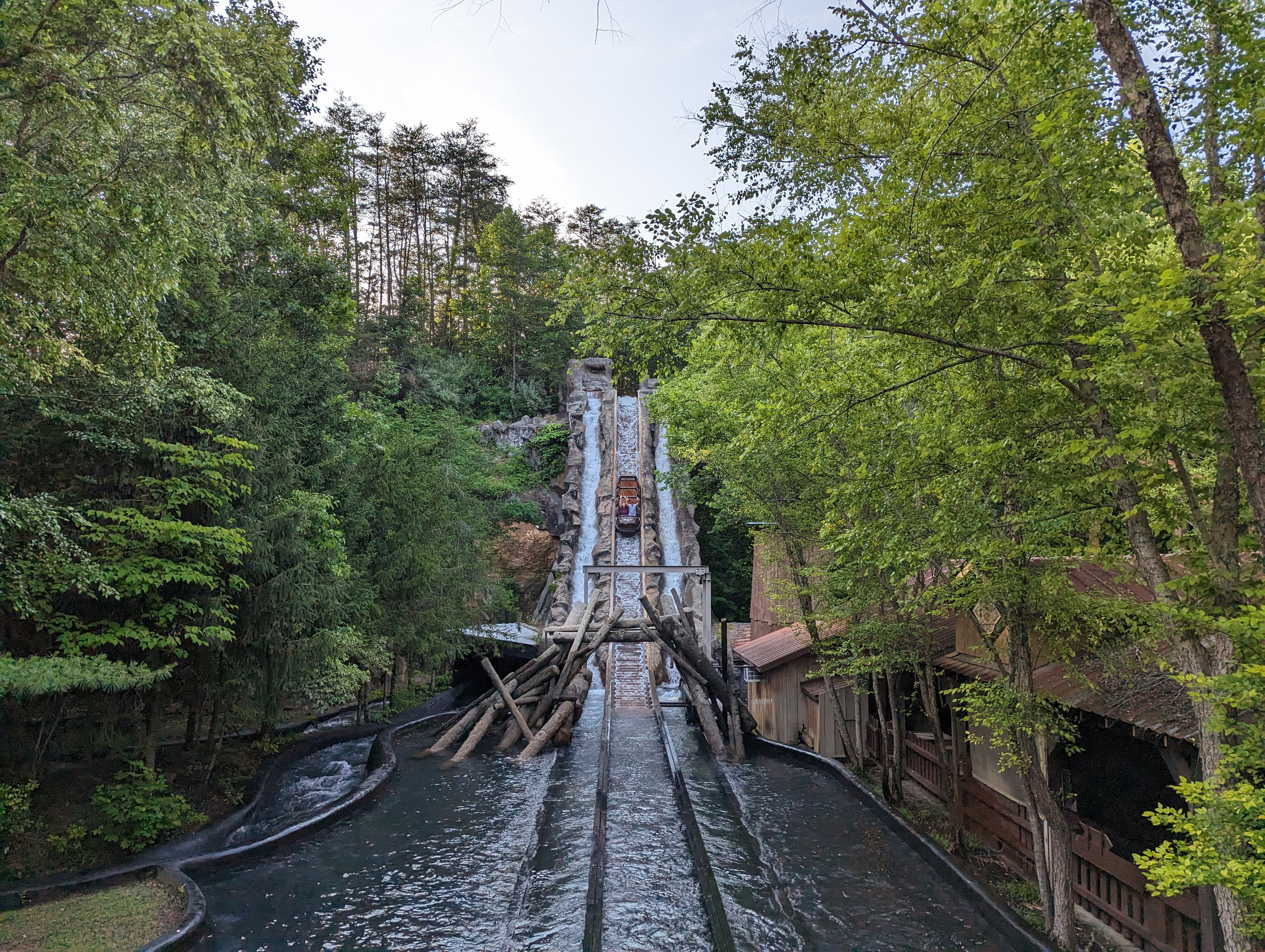

Dollywood
- Area: Craftsman's Valley
- Opening date: April 1998
- Replaced: Flooded Mine

General statistics
- Manufacturer: Hopkins Rides
- Lift system: Chain lift hill
- Height: 20 m (66 ft)
- Length: 411 m (1,348 ft)
- Speed: 80 km/h (50 mph)
- Max vertical angle: 60°
- Duration: 3:56
- Height restriction: 42 in (107 cm)
- Must transfer from wheelchair

Daredevil Falls is a water ride located in Dollywood, consisting of a pipe-like tunnel and a 60 degree drop.

== History ==
The ride opened in April 1998 as a replacement of the older Flooded Mine attraction like the one at the sister park to Dollywood, Silver Dollar City, and was manufactured by Hopkins Rides of Contoocook, New Hampshire.

== Queue ==
The ride is set in a community called Lost River which is a logging community that takes the riders into an abandoned saw mill

== Ride ==
Riders board on a log themed car and go into a pipe. As the vehicle enter the pipe, there's a fluttering noise and red eyes glowing. Riders leave the pipe and there is a bear wrecking a tent. The vehicle makes a sharp turn and goes up a steep lift hill. Once on top, there is a saw coming towards the riders which then turns to the 60 degree drop and then take a sharp turn and pull into the station.
