= Thunderhead (roller coaster) =

Wooden roller coaster at Dollywood

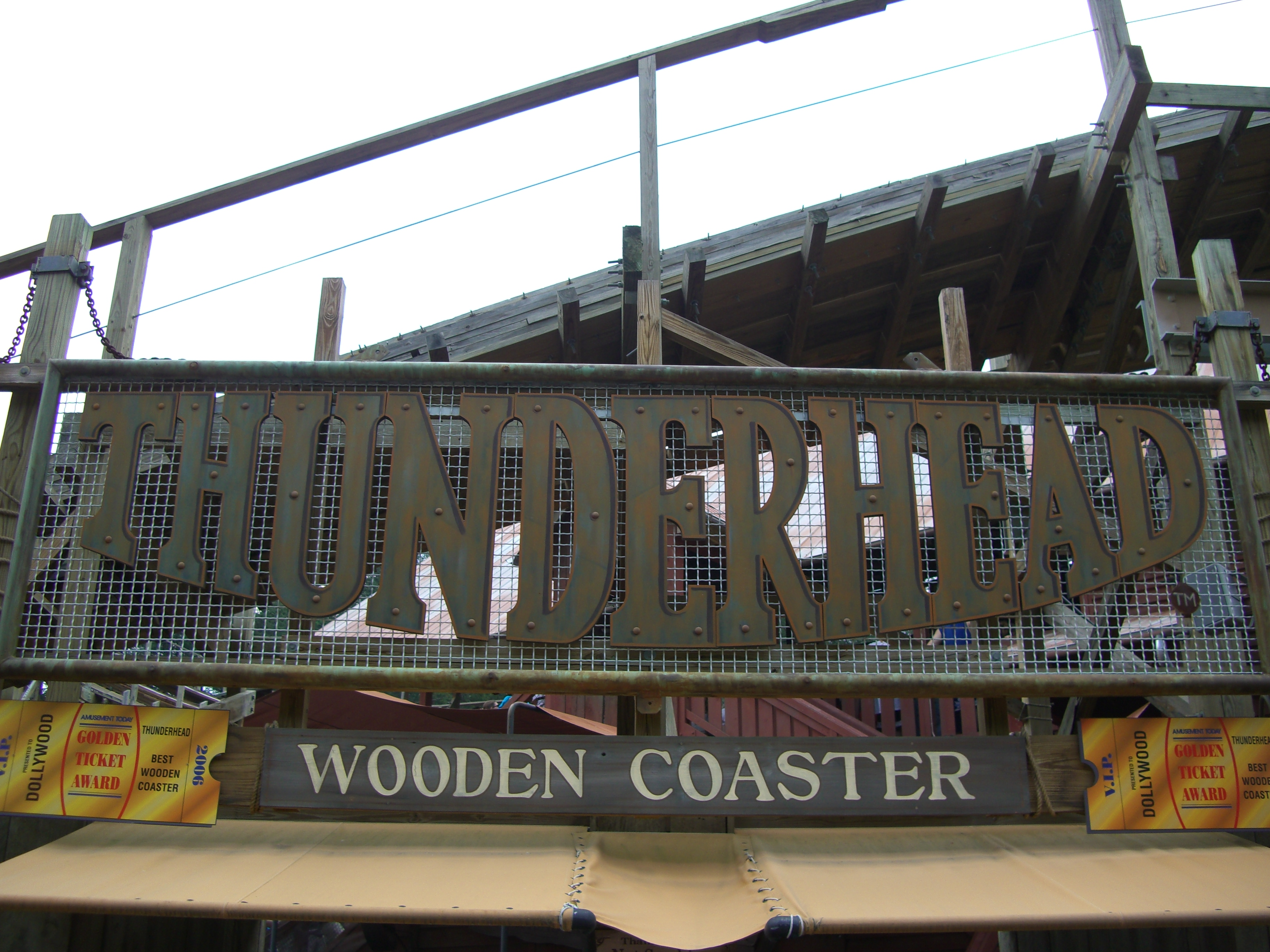
- Thunderhead's logo and two Golden Tickets for the Best Wooden Roller Coaster

Dollywood
- Location: Dollywood
- Park section: Timber Canyon
- Coordinates: 35°47′48″N 83°31′55″W
- Status: Operating
- Opening date: April 3, 2004
- Cost: $7 million

General statistics
- Type: Wood
- Manufacturer: Great Coasters International
- Designer: Mike Boodley
- Track layout: Twister roller coaster
- Lift/launch system: Chain lift hill
- Height: 100.4 ft (30.6 m)
- Drop: 100 ft (30 m)
- Length: 3,230 ft (980 m)
- Speed: 53.7 mph (86.4 km/h)
- Inversions: 0
- Duration: 2:30
- Max vertical angle: 60°
- Height restriction: 48–76 in (122–193 cm)
- Trains: Unknown number of trains with 12 cars; riders arranged 2 across in a single row for a total of 24 riders per train
- TimeSaver Pass available
- Must transfer from wheelchair
- Thunderhead at RCDB

Thunderhead is a wooden roller coaster located at Dollywood amusement park in Pigeon Forge, Tennessee. Manufactured by Great Coasters International, the ride opened on April 3, 2004, as the anchor attraction of a new section added to the park that season called Thunderhead Gap. Thunderhead features 22 turns and 32 crossovers, and utilizes GCI's Millennium Flyer trains, which have been used on all GCI coasters since 1999.

== History ==
On June 26, 2003, Dollywood unveiled plans for a third coaster addition to the park called Thunderhead for the 2004 season, following Tennessee Tornado, which opened in 1999. Thunderhead officially opened to the public on April 3, 2004.

The ride was named after Thunderhead Mountain, a peak within the nearby Great Smoky Mountains National Park that was heavily logged during the early 19th century. A thunderhead is also a common name for a rounded mass of cumulus or cumulonimbus cloud that often appears before a thunderstorm.

== Ride experience ==
The train exits the station and turns right. From there, it makes its way through a left turn and climbs the 100.4-foot (30.6 m) chain lift hill. Upon reaching the top, the train drops 100 feet (30 m) to the right at 53.7 miles per hour (86.4 km/h). Riders go through a right-handed banked turn after the drop. This is followed by a left-handed curve. Next, the train approaches a right turn, heading towards an on-ride camera, which takes photos of the riders. After a 180-degree right turn, riders go through a fly-through station element while traveling 40 miles per hour (64 km/h). The train makes a loud noise as it travels 8 feet (2.4 m) above the station. It then goes through a left-handed curve. A smaller airtime hill leads to a 270-degree helix. Riders then go through a right turn and a left turn before hitting the brakes. The train slowly turns 90 degrees to the right, passing by the transfer track. This is followed by a 180-degree left turn that leads back to the station, where riders exit the train.

== Construction data ==
- 700,000 board feet of Southern Yellow Pine
- 3600 yards of concrete
- 250,000 bolts
- 2,000,000 screws
- 185,000 feet of steel rebar

== Rankings ==
Golden Ticket Awards: Top wood Roller Coasters
Year									1998	1999
Ranking									–	–
Year	2000	2001	2002	2003	2004	2005	2006	2007	2008	2009
Ranking	–	–	–	–	6	1	1	2	2	5
Year	2010	2011	2012	2013	2014	2015	2016	2017	2018	2019
Ranking	5	5	4	5	5	5	7	8	10	11
Year	2020	2021	2022	2023	2024	2025	2026			
Ranking	N/A	10	10	4	4	5	6			

NAPHA Survey: Favorite Wood Roller Coaster
Year	2005	2006	2007	2008	2009
Ranking	4	4	3	3	3

== Gallery ==
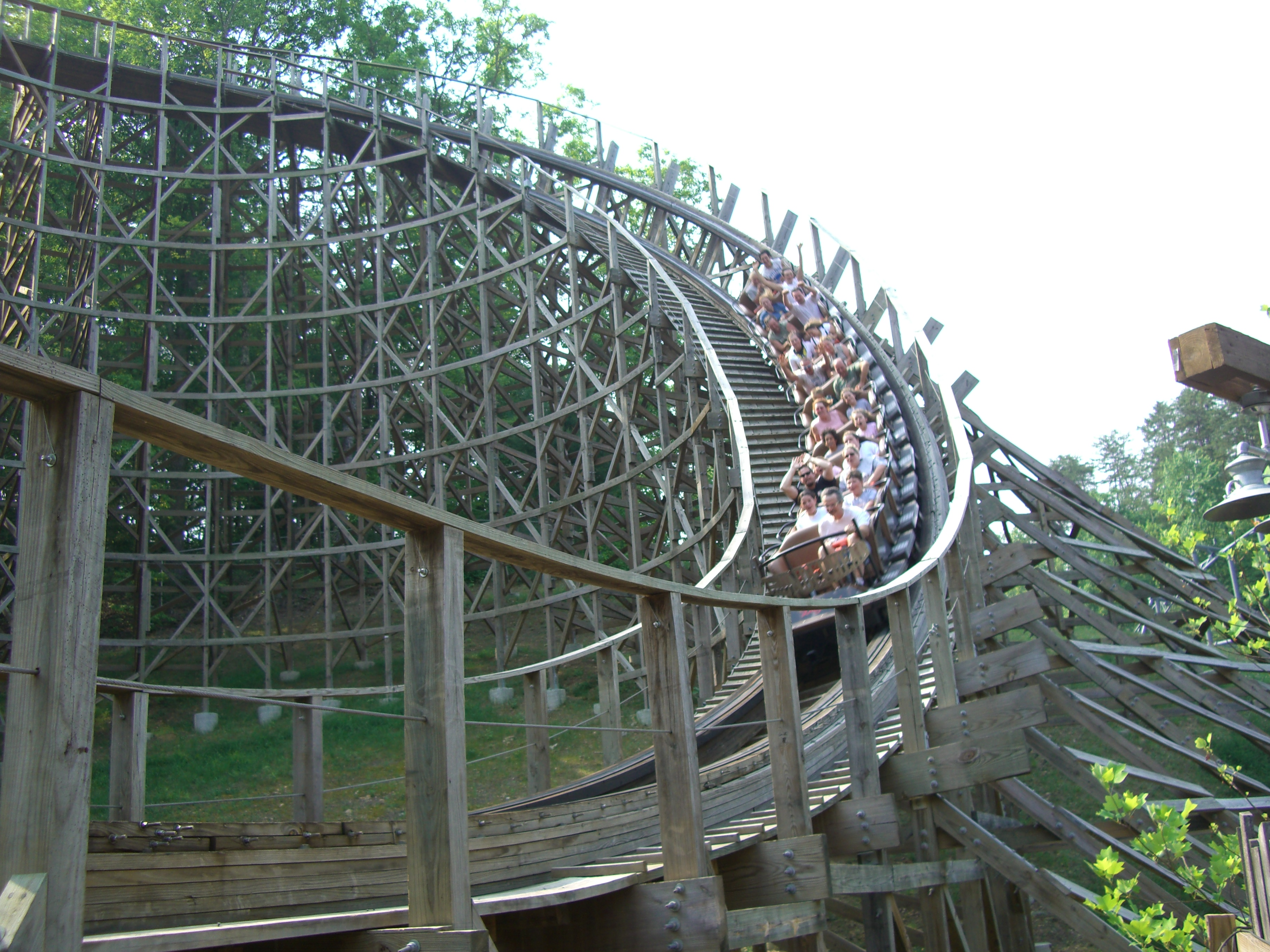
Thunderhead's second drop

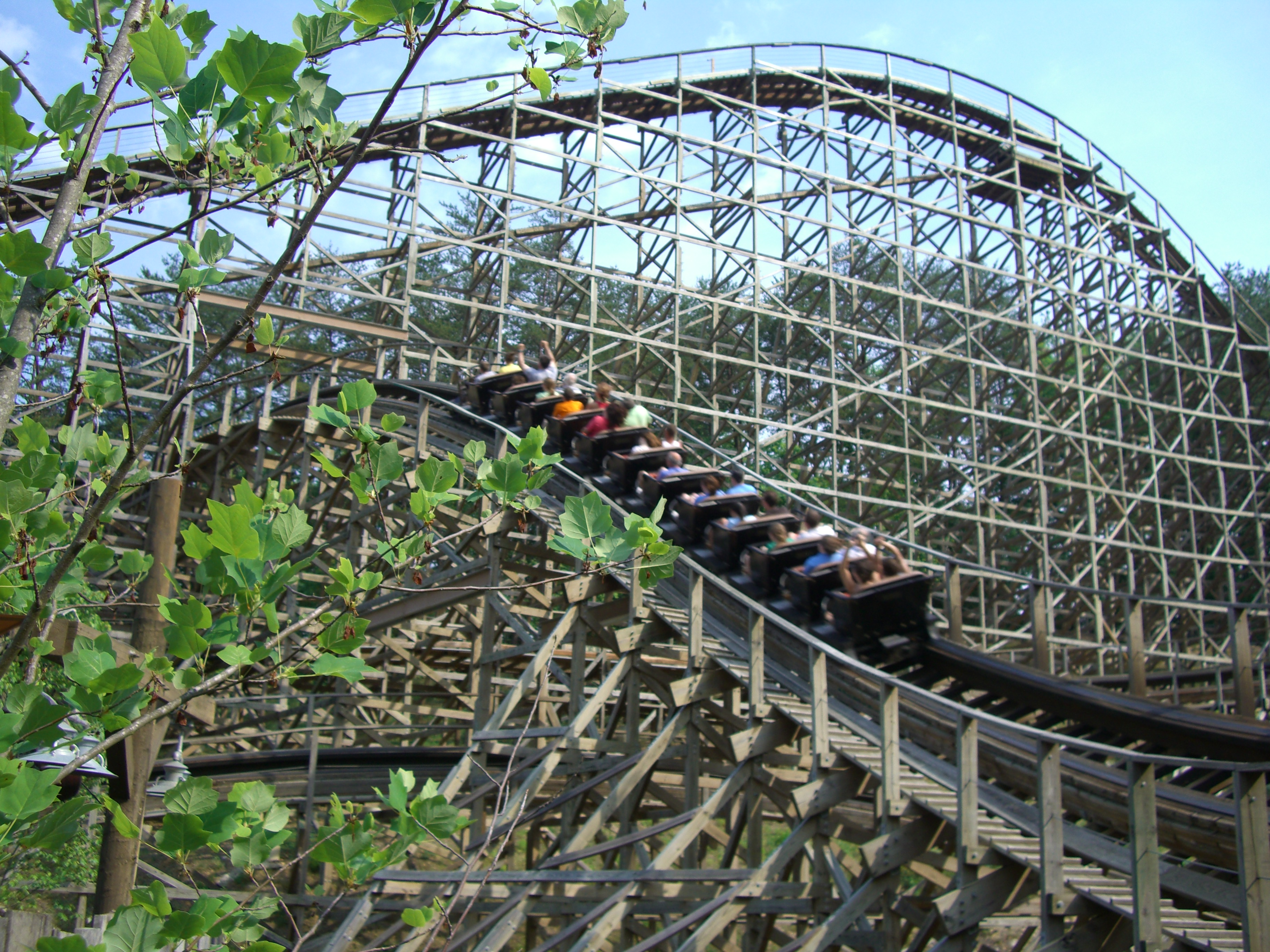
Thunderhead's first airtime hill

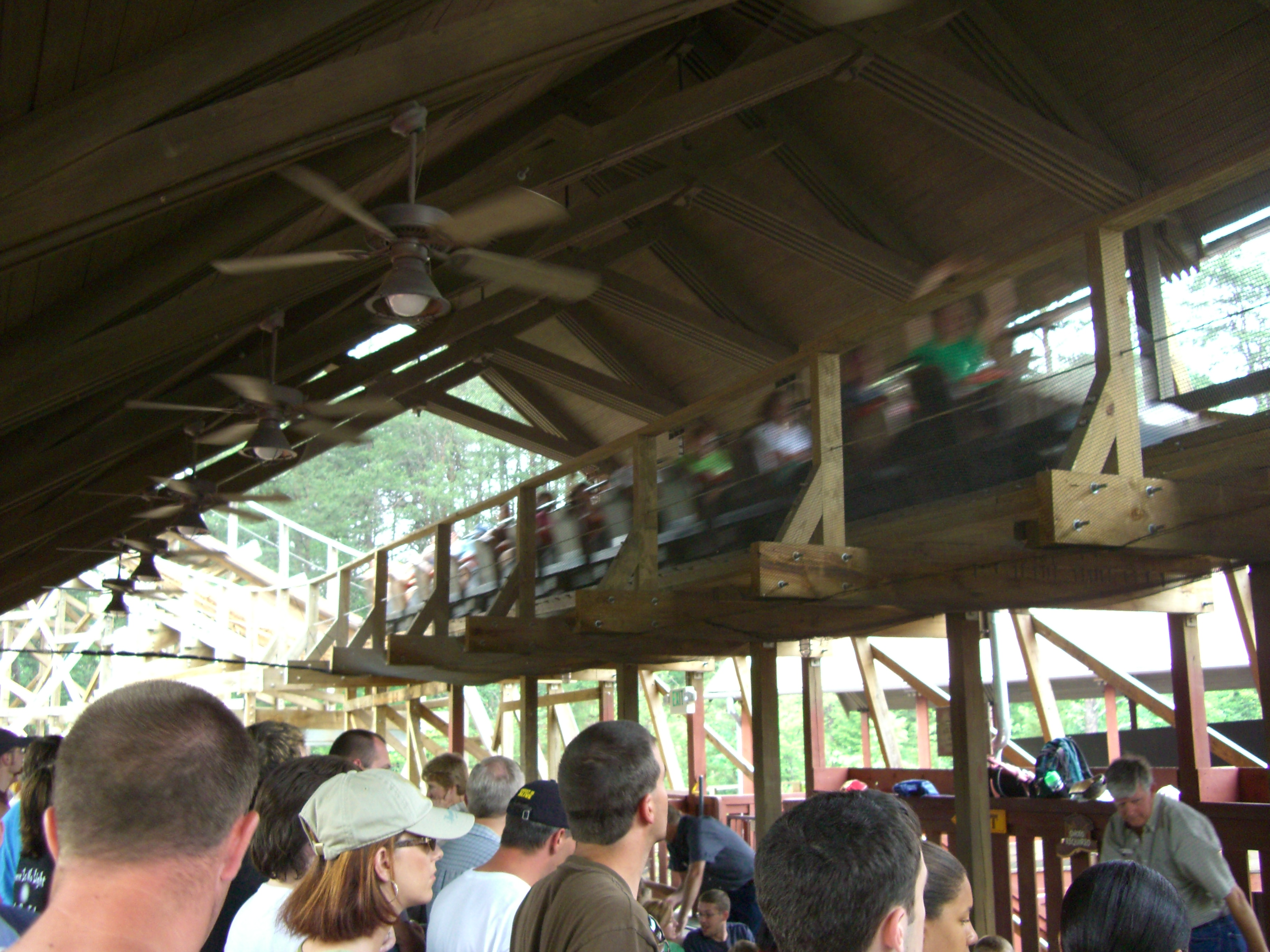
Thunderhead's station fly-through

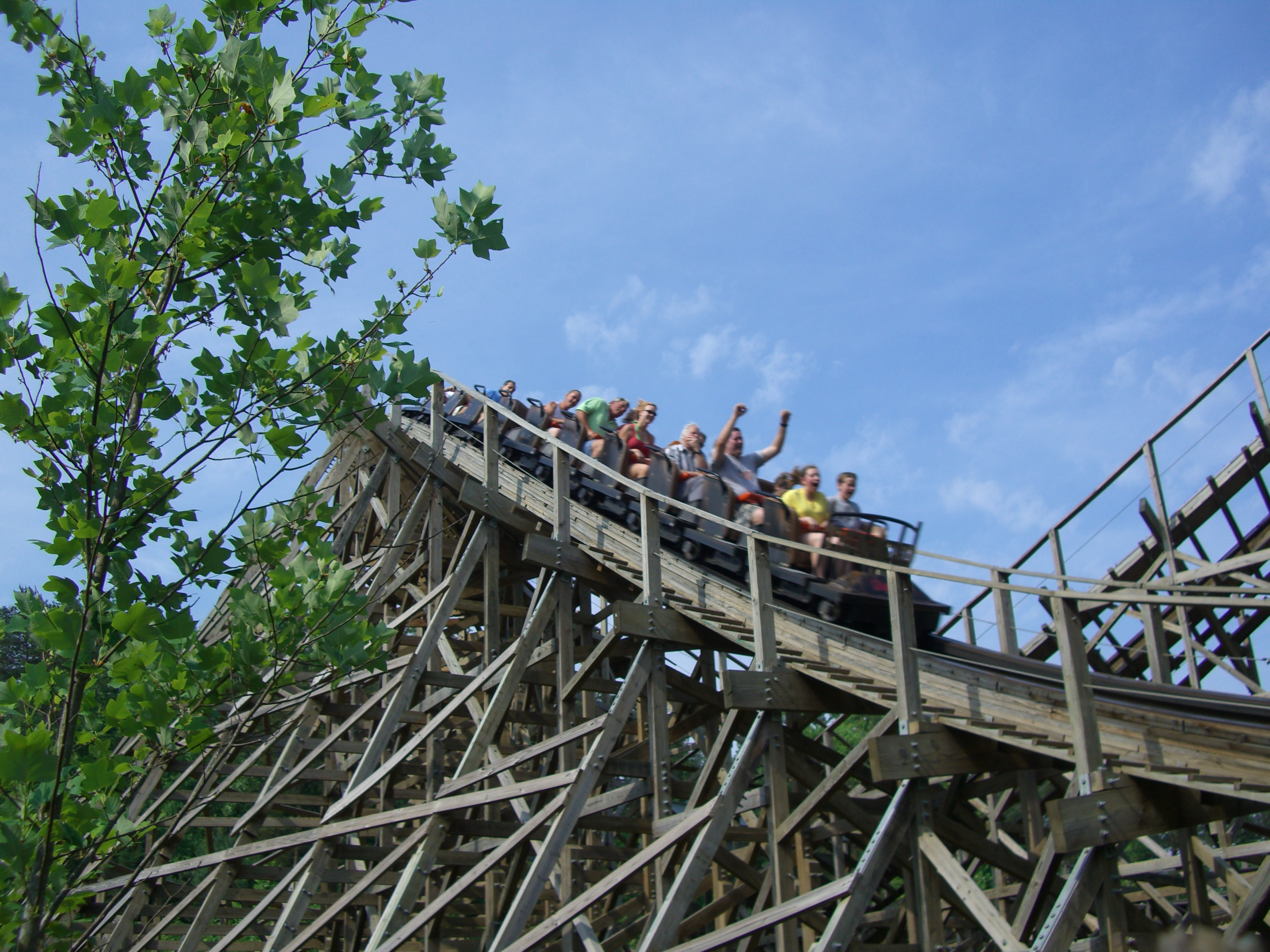
Thunderhead's drop after its station fly-through
