= Flug der Dämonen =

Wing roller coaster at Heide Park

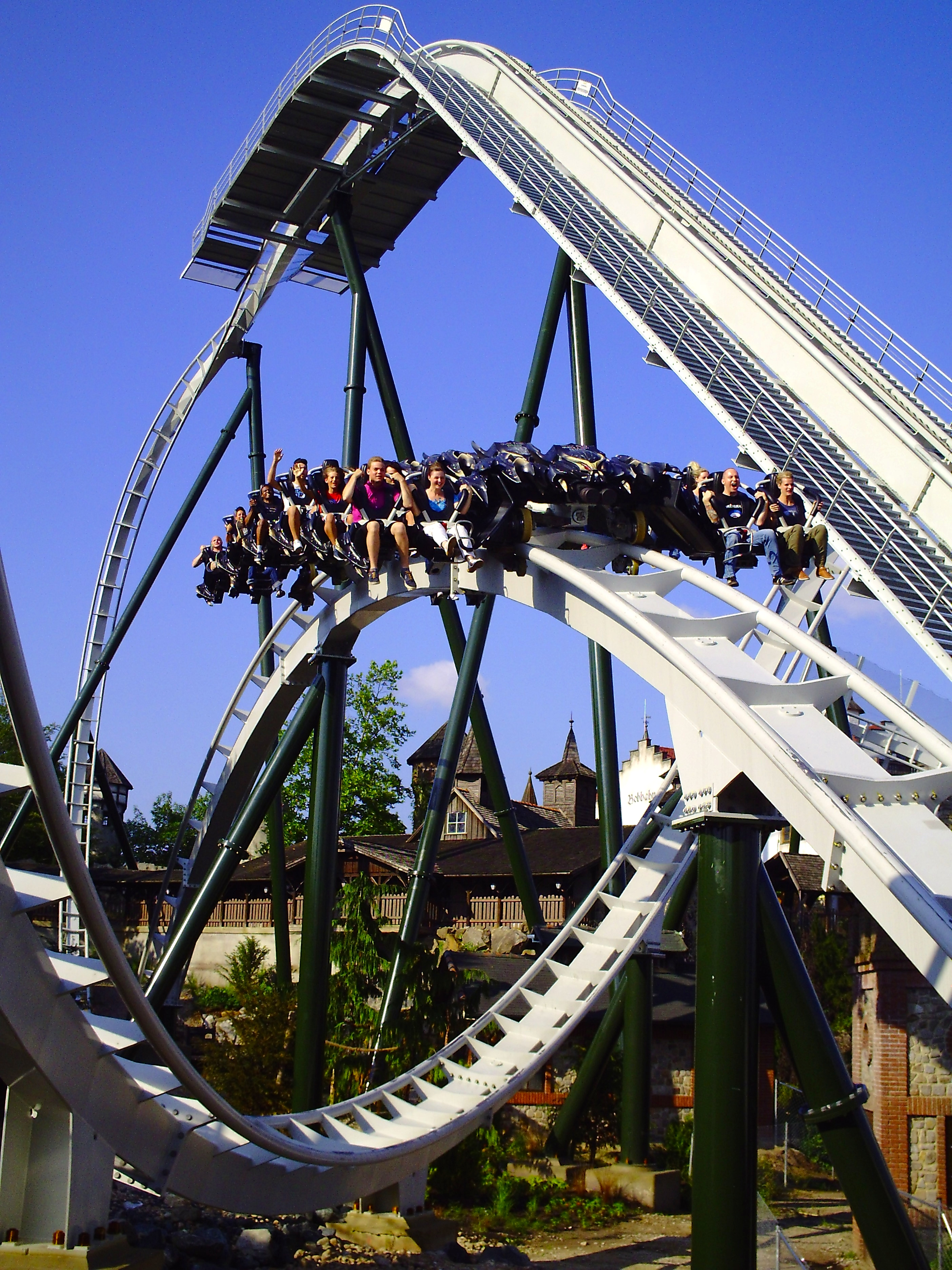
- (Top) Logo of Flug der Dämonen (Bottom) One of Flug der Dämonen's trains

Heide Park Resort
- Location: Heide Park Resort
- Park section: Transsilvanien
- Coordinates: 53.026181°N 9.879649°E
- Status: Operating
- Opening date: March 29, 2014
- Cost: €15,000,000 ($USD19.9 million)
- Replaced: Wildwasserbahn II

General statistics
- Type: Steel – Wing Coaster
- Manufacturer: Bolliger & Mabillard
- Model: Wing Coaster
- Lift/launch system: Chain lift hill
- Height: 40 m (130 ft)
- Length: 772 m (2,533 ft)
- Speed: 100 km/h (62 mph)
- Inversions: 5
- Duration: 0:52 minutes
- Capacity: 1060 riders per hour
- G-force: 4
- Height restriction: 140–195 cm (4 ft 7 in – 6 ft 5 in)
- Trains: 2 trains with 6 cars. Riders are arranged 4 across in a single row for a total of 24 riders per train.
- Theme: Transylvania
- Express Butler available
- Single rider line available
- Flug der Dämonen at RCDB

Flug der Dämonen (German for "Flight of the Demons") is a Bolliger & Mabillard Wing Coaster at the Heide Park Resort amusement park located in Soltau, Lower Saxony, Germany. The attraction officially opened to the public on March 29, 2014.

== History ==
During the 2012 season, the Wildwasserbahn 2 was completely dismantled. Before that there were a few speculations about a new rollercoaster on the place of the Wildwasserbahn 2. In the 2013 season of the park, the coaster was announced in late summer, but before that, the themepark announced the new ride as follows: "It's big. It's fast. It comes. Closer and closer and closer. Premiere for Germany 2014. Here at Heide Park Resort.". On August 18, 2013, one day before Heide Park Resorts' 35th birthday, the park announced some details about the new ride to the media. The park also put up a website saying that the full details of the ride will be announced in the morning of August 19, 2013. On this website were construction updates and other information about Flug der Dämonen. The name of the new Wing Coaster was announced on January 8, 2014. It officially opened to the public on March 29, 2014.

== Ride experience ==
Layout of Flug der Dämonen

After being dispatched from the station, the train makes a right hand turn, entering the 130-foot (40 m) lift hill. Upon reaching the top of the lift hill, the train enters the first element of the roller coaster, a dive drop. This element is similar to the dive drops found on X-Flight at Six Flags Great America and The Swarm at Thorpe Park, and it consists of the train rotating 180 degrees into an inverted position before descending back to the ground. During this drop, the train reaches its maximum speed of 62 mph (100 km/h). Next, the train enters a camelback hill producing a moment of airtime. Upon exiting the hill, the train immediately enters an Immelmann loop. Next, the train goes through a corkscrew inversion, followed by a left-handed 270-degree downward helix. The next element is a new element called a demonic knot, which consists of a combination of an inclined dive loop followed by an inclined Immelmann loop. The train then enters a 315-degree left hand turn leading into the final brake run.

== Characteristics ==
=== Track ===
Flug der Dämonen's tubular steel track is 772 metres (2,533 ft) long and the lift is approximately 40 metres (130 ft). The track is white and the supports are dark green. Also, the entire track weighs a total of about 650 tonnes (640 long tons; 720 short tons).

=== Trains ===
Flug der Dämonen operates with two open-air steel and fiberglass trains, each with six cars of four seats each, with two on each side of the track. Each train holds 24 riders and the ride has a capacity of about 1,060 riders per hour. Riders are restrained by flexible over-the-shoulder restraints and interlocking seat belts and riders are required to be between 140 centimetres (4.6 ft) and 195 centimetres (6.40 ft) to ride. Because the seats are on the side of the track, a cantilevered steel arm is used to support the wings.

The trains are painted black and white. The front of each train is shaped to resemble the head of a demon. It was designed by German graffiti artist Markus Genesius.

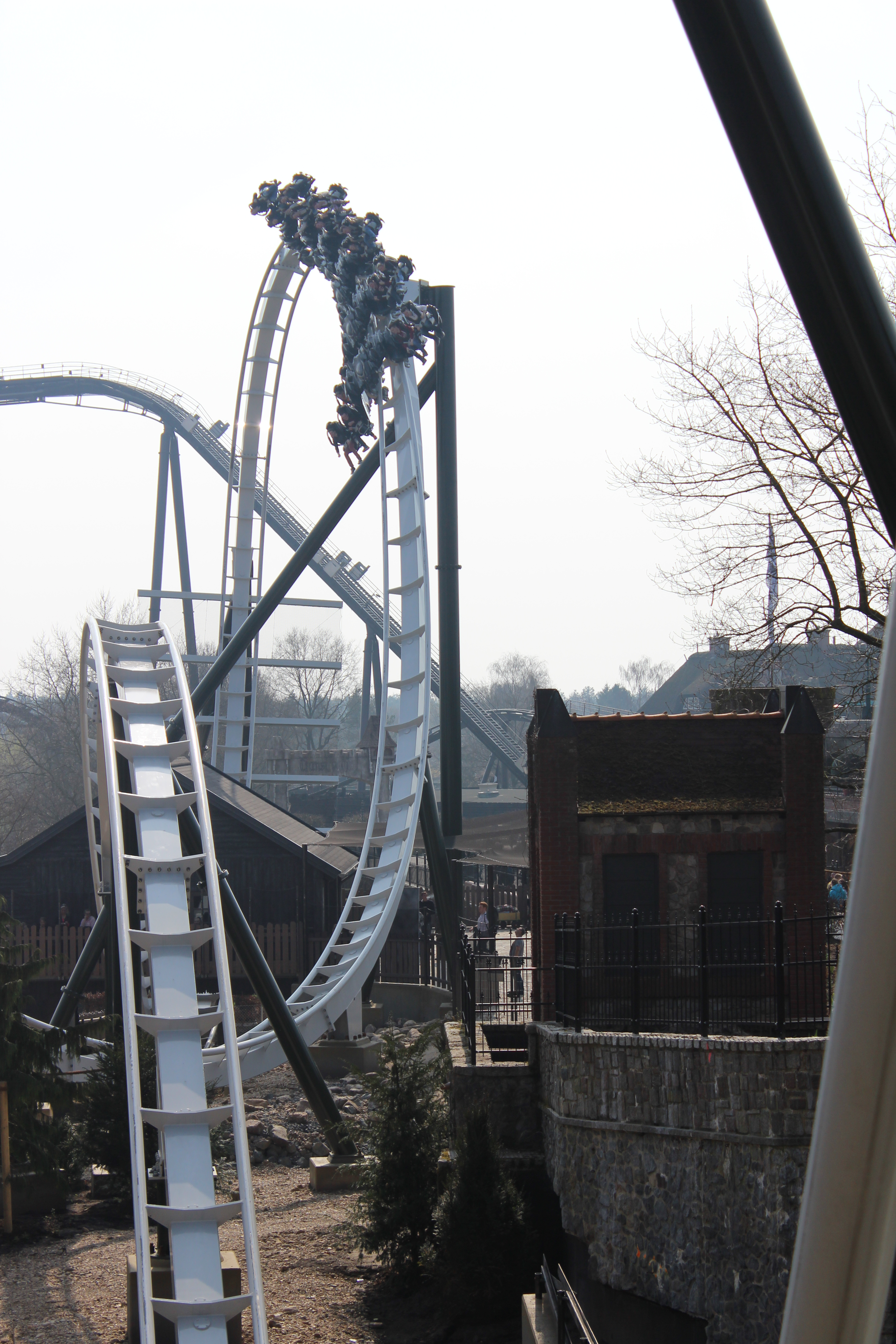
The Immelmann inversion
