= Parrot Coaster =

Wing roller coaster in Zhuhai, China

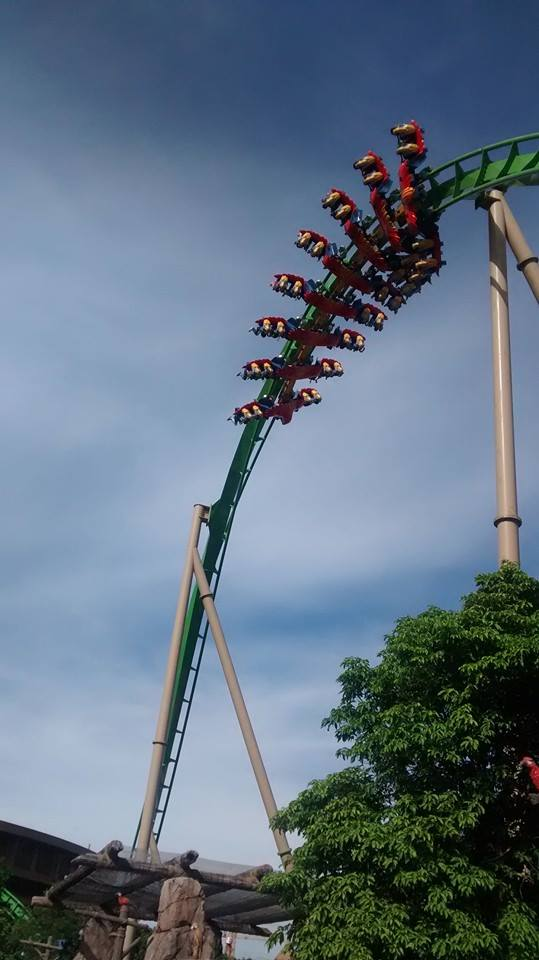
- Parrot Coaster

Chime-Long Ocean Kingdom
- Location: Chime-Long Ocean Kingdom
- Park section: Amazing Amazon
- Coordinates: 22.101640°N 113.528959°E
- Status: Operating
- Opening date: January 25, 2014

General statistics
- Type: Steel – Wing Coaster
- Manufacturer: Bolliger & Mabillard
- Model: Wing Coaster
- Track layout: Twister
- Lift/launch system: Chain lift hill
- Height: 164.1 ft (50.0 m)
- Length: 1,278 m (4,193 ft)
- Speed: 67 mph (108 km/h)
- Inversions: 3
- Height restriction: 140 cm (4 ft 7 in)
- Trains: 3 trains with 8 cars. Riders are arranged 4 across in a single row for a total of 32 riders per train.
- Parrot Coaster at RCDB

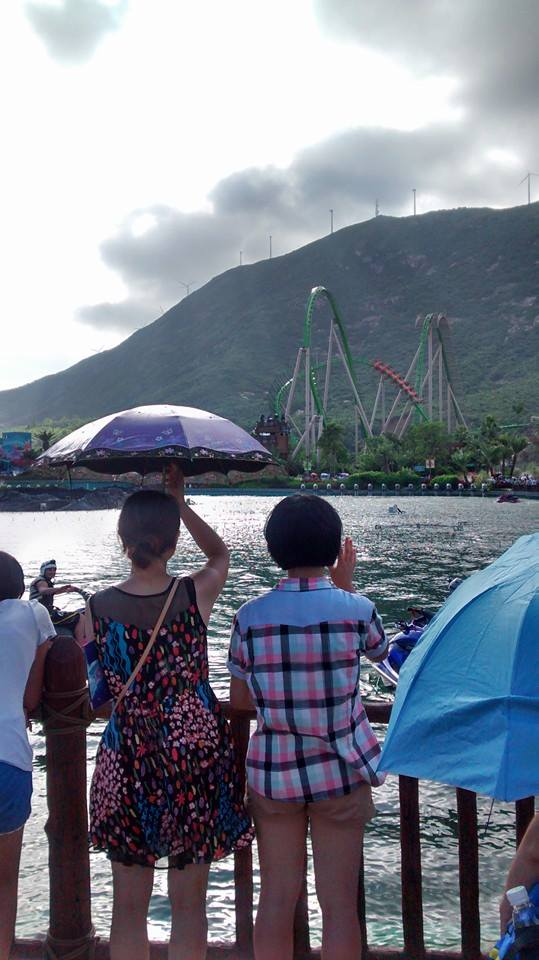
Distant View of Parrot Coaster, August 2014

Parrot Coaster (formerly known as Flying Over the Rainforest) is a steel Wing Coaster at Chimelong Ocean Kingdom in Zhuhai, Guangdong, China. Manufactured by Bolliger & Mabillard, upon its opening in 2014, it became the first Wing Coaster in Asia and also features the first splashdown on a Wing Coaster. With a height of 164.1 feet (50.0 m), it is also the third tallest of its kind, behind Wild Eagle at Dollywood and GateKeeper at Cedar Point. The roller coaster is the longest Wing Coaster in the world, at 4,192.9 feet (1,278.0 m) in length and reaching a top speed of 67.1 miles per hour (108.0 km/h). The ride was named Flying Over the Rainforest for the first two months of it operating before being renamed at the end of March 2014.

== Ride experience ==
After being dispatched from the station, the train makes a left hand turn, entering the 164-foot (50 m) lift hill. Once at the top, the train drops back down and enters a diving loop. Next, the train makes a short left hand turn before making an upward right turn. The train then drops back down and goes through an artificial splashdown. Following a zero-gravity roll, the train then makes a banked left turn and an upward right turn leading into the mid-course brake run. After passing through the brake run, the train drops down into a tunnel (under a path). Upon exiting the tunnel, the train makes a left turn, followed by a right which leads directly into the last inversion, an inline twist. After making a right turn into a second tunnel, the train makes a left hand helix which leads into the final brake run.

=== Track ===
The length of the steel track of Parrot Coaster is 4,192.9 feet (1,278.0 m) and the lift hill is 164.1 feet (50.0 m) tall. The color of the track is green while the supports are a light brown.

=== Trains ===
Parrot Coaster operates with 3 steel and fiberglass trains. Each train features eight cars that can seat four riders each. The seats are located level with the track on either side. Between the pair of seats on the first car of each train, there is a large parrot head. The trains are painted: blue, green, red and yellow.
