= Mandrill Mayhem =

British roller coaster at Chessington World of Adventures

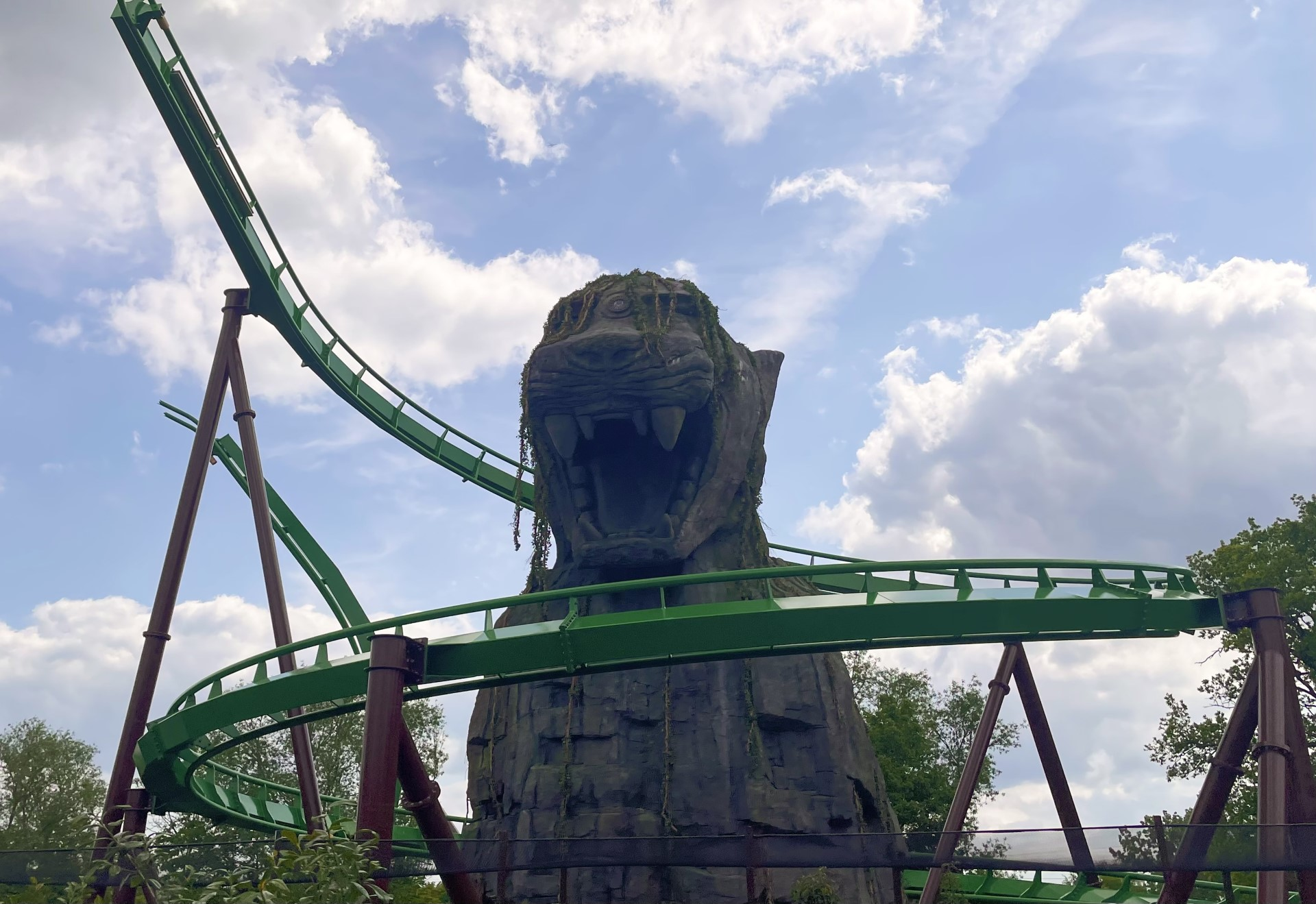

Chessington World of Adventures
- Location: Chessington World of Adventures
- Park section: World of Jumanji
- Coordinates: 51.34728°N 0.31764°W
- Status: Operating
- Opening date: 15 May 2023

General statistics
- Type: Steel – Wing – Shuttle
- Manufacturer: Bolliger & Mabillard
- Model: Wing Coaster
- Lift/launch system: LSM launch
- Height: 66 ft (20 m)
- Length: 1,247 ft (380 m)
- Speed: 45 mph (72 km/h)
- Inversions: 2 (once forwards and once backwards)
- Capacity: 840 riders per hour
- G-force: 3.5G
- Height restriction: 47.2 in (120 cm)
- Trains: Single train with 7 cars; riders arranged 4 across in a single row for a total of 28 riders per train
- Theme: Jumanji
- Wheelchair accessible
- Mandrill Mayhem at RCDB

Mandrill Mayhem is a launched, steel shuttle wing coaster located at Chessington World of Adventures in Chessington, United Kingdom. The ride was designed by Swiss rollercoaster manufacturers Bolliger & Mabillard, and is located in the World of Jumanji section of the park, themed to the Jumanji film and book franchise. A consultation for the ride took place in May 2021, and the coaster opened two years later on the 15th May 2023.

The 1,247-foot-long (380 m) ride stands 66 feet (20 m) tall and features one inversion – an inline twist, two LSM launches, a junior scorpion tail spike and a 405° spiral rollback. Riders experience speeds of up to 45 mph (72 km/h). The trains are stylized as mandrill monkeys holding the riders in their arms. The ride features a single train with 7 rows, with the last row facing backwards. Riders are arranged 4 across in a single row for a total of 28 riders, making for a theoretical capacity of 840 guests per hour.

Guests between 1.2m and 1.3m must be accompanied by an adult over the age of 16, while those a minimum height of 1.3m can ride alone. The ride sits alongside two other attractions, manufactured by the Italian SBF Visa Group, Ostrich Stampede (a ‘Jump & Smile’ model) and Mamba Strike (a ‘Miami’ flat ride).

Mandrill Mayhem is the first and only Bolliger & Mabillard installation in the world that does not form a complete circuit.

== History ==
Chessington opened an online, two-week consultation for the ride and the surrounding area on the 17th May 2021, and held two in-person consultation in the hotel's conference centre. Plans were then submitted to Kingston Council in August 2021, with the park citing they “must respond decisively” following the COVID-19 pandemic, with an attraction that “excites visitors and generates interest within the industry”. Plans were approved for the area towards the end of January 2022, starting a 15-month build process.

The ride and the surrounding area were officially announced to themed to the Jumanji franchise in August 2022, with trademarks submitted for the attractions in December of that year. Merlin Magic Making's lead creative, John Burton designed the area. The land, including Mandrill Mayhem had a press launch on the 13th May 2023, by Merlin Entertainment's CEO, Scott O' Neil, who said the themed land was his company's “most expansive and exciting yet”. The World of Jumanji is said to have cost £17 million, serving as the park's single biggest investment since opening.

The attraction officially opened on the 15th May 2023, with a virtual queuing system due to uncertainty around the ride's capacity to manage a conventional queue. Six Jumanji themed bedrooms complimented the area, in the park's Safari Hotel, following a deal between Merlin Entertainments and Sony covering both Europe and North America, which includes attractions, rides, lands, retail outlets and themed hotel rooms.

== Description ==
Mandrill Mayhem is the first-ever shuttle wing coaster built by Bolliger & Mabillard, and the second B&M wing coaster in the UK with the other being The Swarm opened in 2012 at sister park Thorpe Park, which follows a full circuit.

The ride begins with the train stationary at the station before being launched backward, entering a banked turn. The train then ascends a 65-foot (20-meter) ‘beyond-vertical’ spike, known as a "Junior Scorpion Tail" due to its distinctive shape. Although the angle exceeds 90°, it is not considered an inversion. As the train climbs, it briefly stalls at the peak, causing riders to momentarily face downward before gravity pulls the train back down.

The train passes through the station once more, receiving a second launch that accelerates it to a maximum speed of 45 mph. It then banks to the left, rising through an in-line twist above the entrance to the Jumanji-themed area, marking the park’s first inversion. Following this, the train banks left again, receiving a third small boost via a launch before beginning to ascend a 405° upward helix. This helix spirals around the central theming feature of the area, the ‘Jaguar Shrine’—a rock sculpture shaped like a large feline predator’s head, referencing Jumanji: Welcome to the Jungle. At the peak of the helix, the highest point of the attraction, the train loses momentum and stalls. As a result, it begins to roll backward, retracing its path in reverse. The train then returns to the station, where it gradually comes to a stop.
