= LC12 =

LC12 can refer to:

- LC12 is the common name for Cape Canaveral Air Force Station Launch Complex 12
- LC12 was the development code name for The Swarm (roller coaster)
