= Wing Coaster =

Type of roller coaster

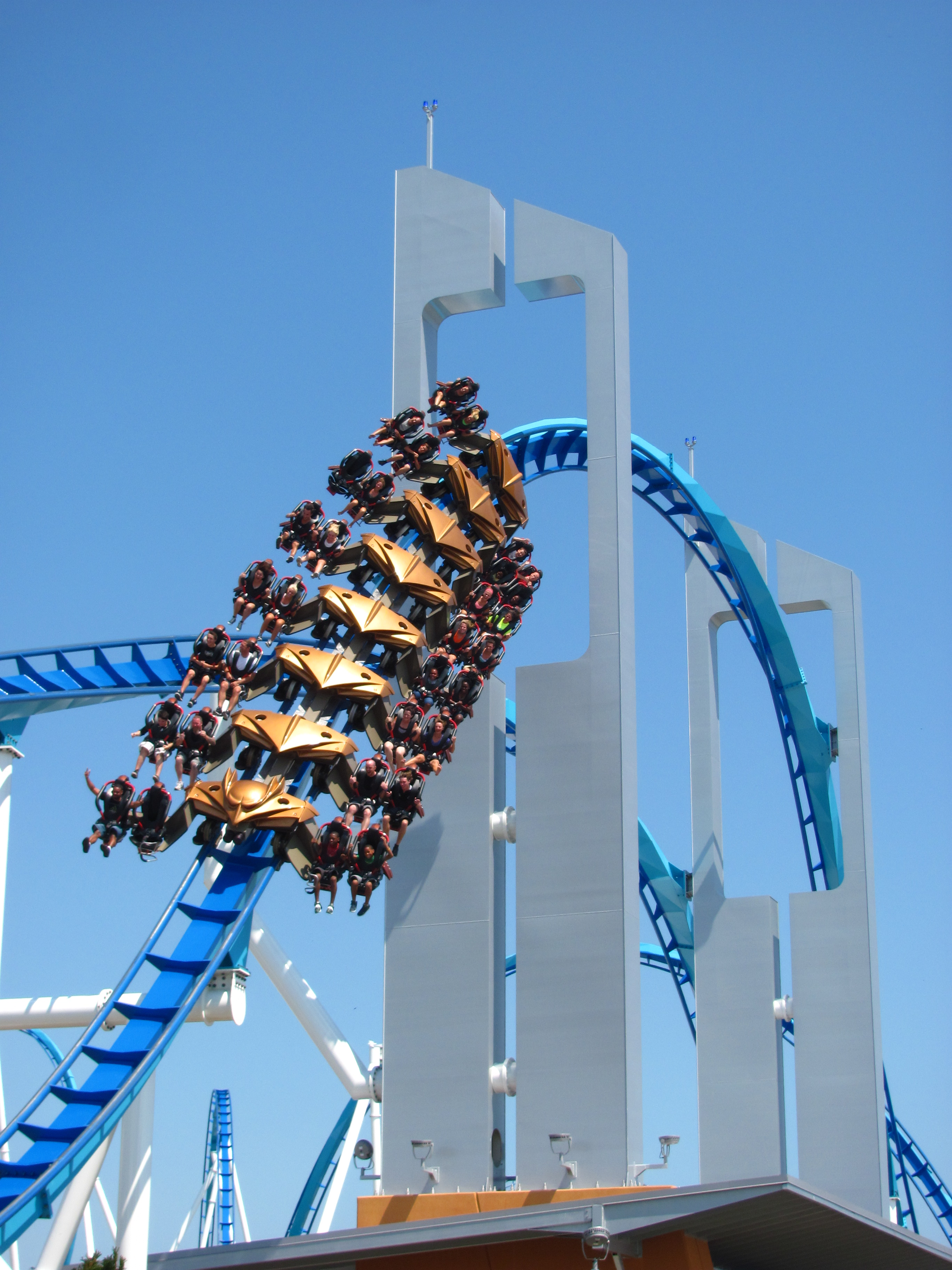
- GateKeeper at Cedar Point.
- Status: In production
- First manufactured: 2011
- No. of installations: 19
- Manufacturer: Bolliger & Mabillard
- Vehicle type: Train seats are located level with the track on both sides.
- Riders per row: 4
- Restraint Style: Rubber vest over chest and lap bar
- Wing Coaster at RCDB

Wing Coaster is engineering firm Bolliger & Mabillard’s designation for its winged roller coaster designs. Winged roller coasters are a type of steel roller coaster where pairs of riders sit on either side of a roller coaster track in which nothing is above or below the riders. B&M began development on the first Wing Coaster between 2007 and 2008 leading to the opening of Raptor at Gardaland on 1 April 2011. There were eighteen B&M-designed Wing Coasters either under construction or operating worldwide as of 2024, with one more standing but not operating.

== History ==
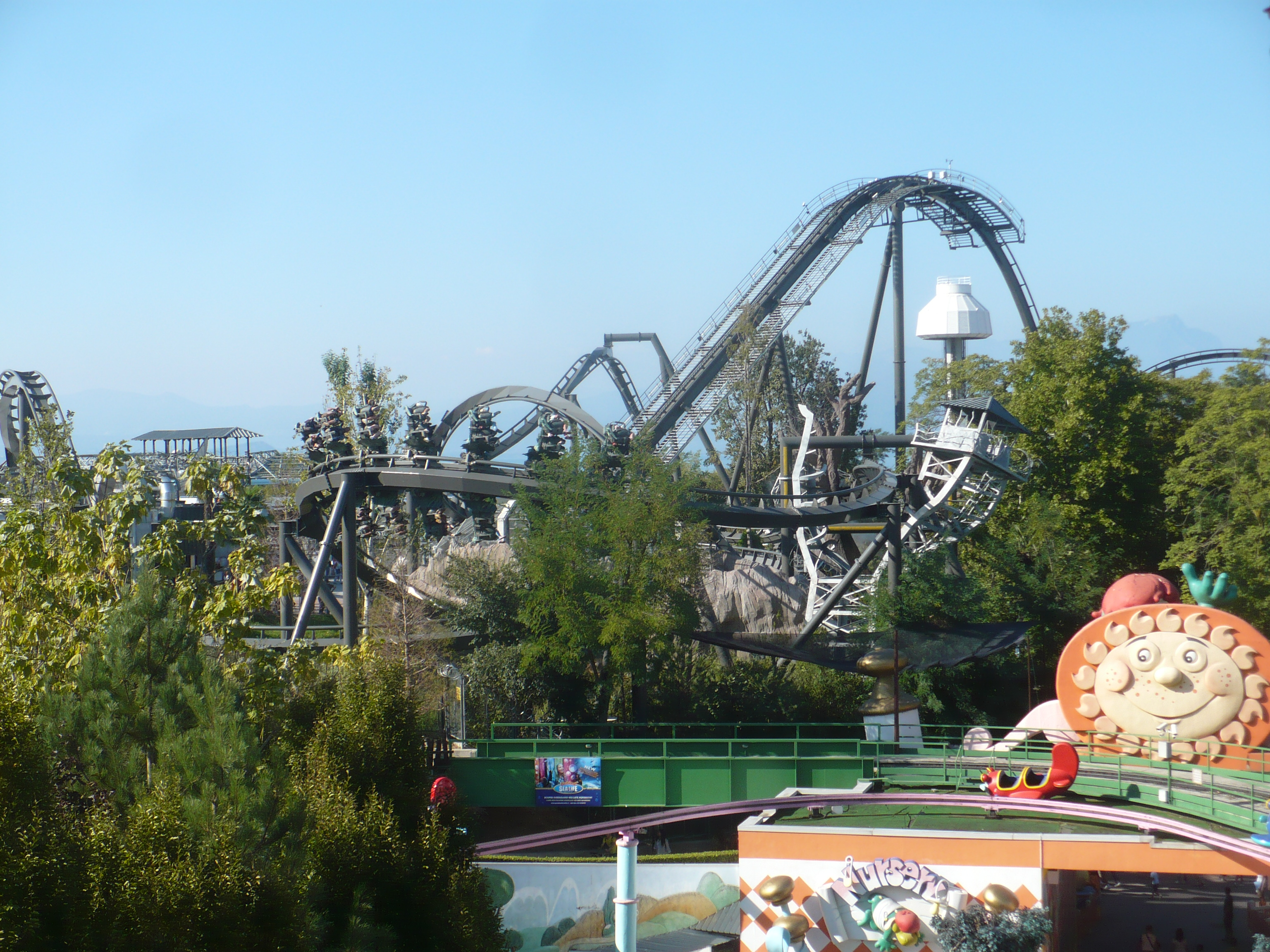
Raptor at Gardaland was the world's first Wing Coaster, opening in 2011.

According to Walter Bolliger, development of the Wing Coaster began between 2007 and 2008. In 2010, Bolliger & Mabillard announced a prototype Wing Coaster design that would be built at Merlin Entertainments' Gardaland. It became known as Raptor, which opened on 1 April 2011. A year later, Merlin Entertainments opened a second Wing Coaster on 15 March 2012, called The Swarm at Thorpe Park.

In the United States, the first Wing Coaster to be announced was X-Flight, which opened at Six Flags Great America on 16 May 2012. Dollywood's Wild Eagle actually opened earlier on 24 March 2012, making it the first Wing Coaster in North America. On 13 August 2012, Cedar Point announced plans to build a new Wing Coaster called GateKeeper, which set new records for a Wing Coaster including longest track length, fastest speed and drop height. The first Wing Coaster in Asia, Parrot Coaster, opened at Ocean Kingdom on 25 January 2014. Thorpe Park announced that the last two rows of The Swarm would be turned backwards – a first for a Wing Coaster – for the 2013 season. On 24 July 2014, Holiday World & Splashin' Safari announced Thunderbird, the first launched Wing Coaster.

== Design ==
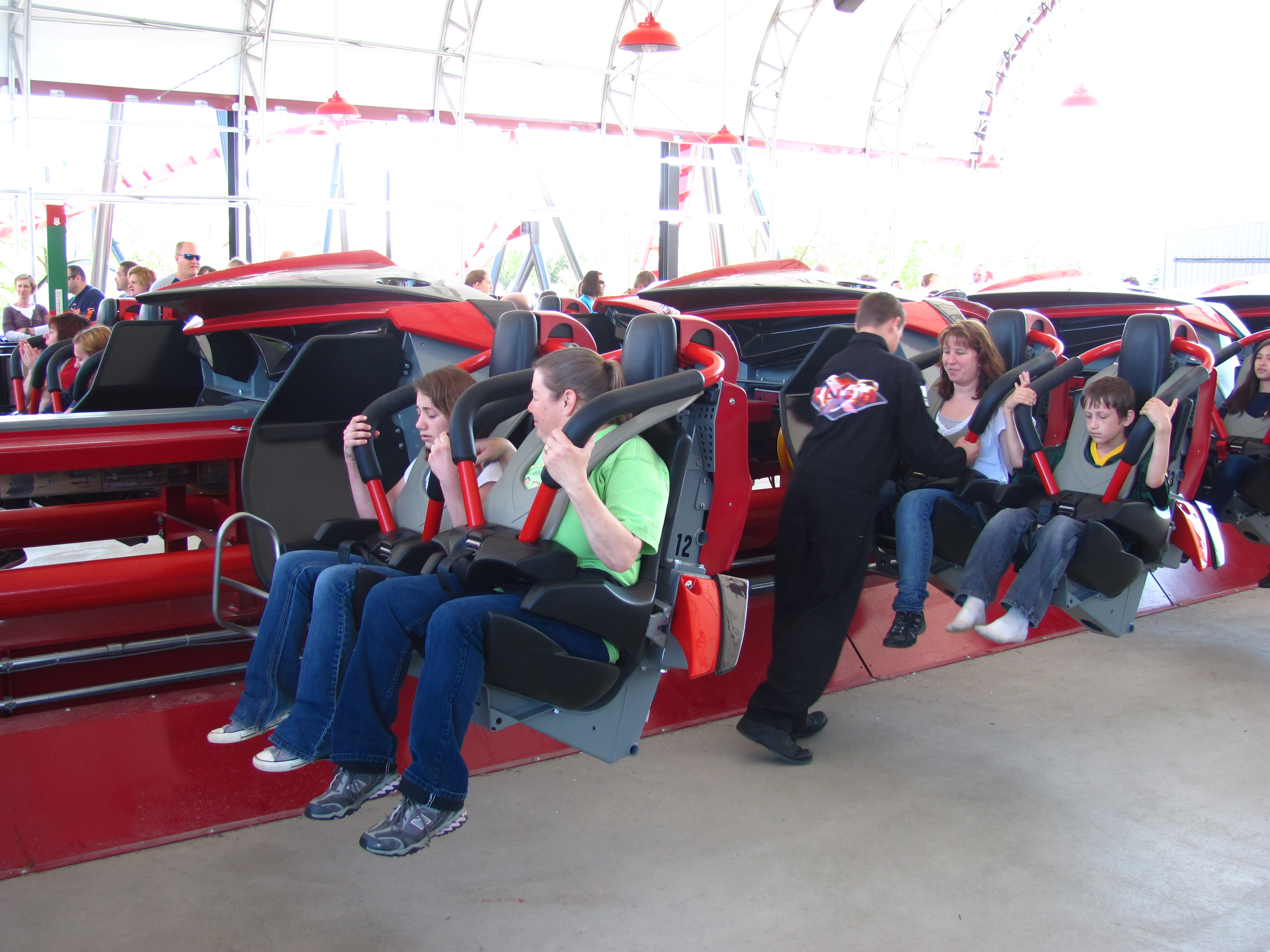
A ride operator checking the restraints on X-Flight at Six Flags Great America. Notice how the bars on the restraint system are not what actually hold the rider in place.

Nothing above, nothing below. An unprecedented feeling of freedom.

— Bolliger & Mabillard

The design of a Wing Coaster differs from many traditional steel roller coasters in that its trains are not located above or below the track but rather on the sides, a configuration that give riders the impression of free flight. Also, because there is nothing on top of the track and only steel beams holding each ends of the train together, all current Wing Coasters have an object (that relates to the theme) that covers the steel beams and adds to the experience. The restraints on the trains are also different. Instead of simply having the traditional over-the-shoulder restraint bar used on many inverted roller coasters, the Wing Coaster restraints are similar to Bolliger & Mabillard's Flying Coaster, which includes a vest restraint and a waist-level restraint with bars on the side for the rider to hold on to. The Wing Coaster's differences extended to the station layout of the station, which requires the queue to split in two halves, allowing riders to board the train where the seats sit level with the track.

== Installations ==
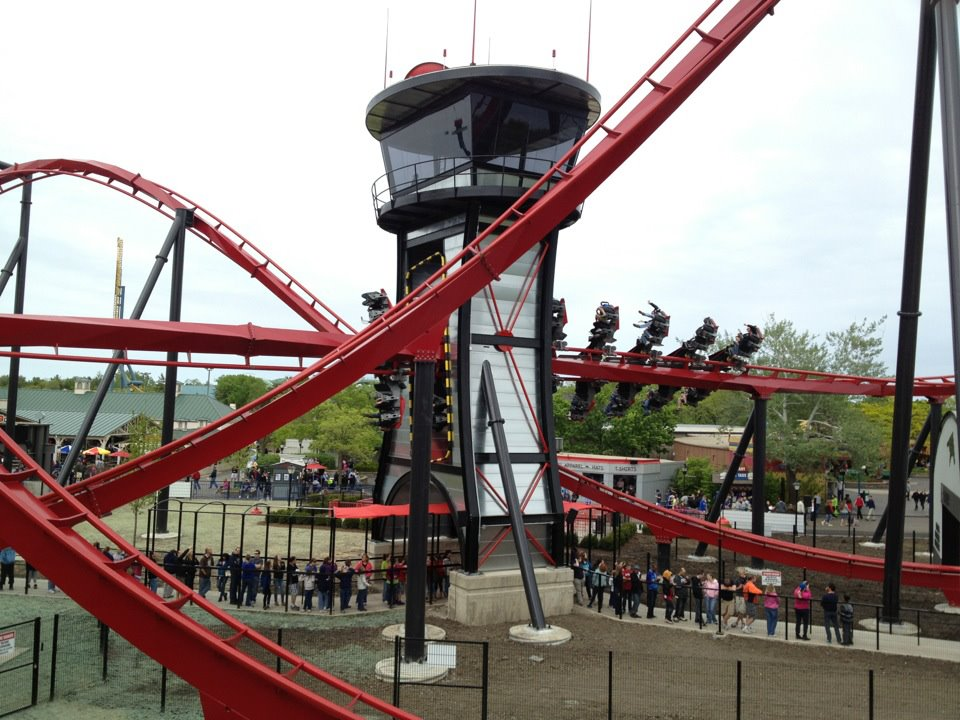
X-Flight at Six Flags Great America going through the signature keyhole element.

Bolliger & Mabillard has built or is in the process of building a total of nineteen Wing Coasters as of December 2024. The roller coasters are listed in order of opening dates.

Name	Park	Country	Opened	Status
Raptor	Gardaland	Italy	1 April 2011	Operating
The Swarm	Thorpe Park	United Kingdom	15 March 2012	Operating
Wild Eagle	Dollywood	United States	24 March 2012	Operating
X-Flight	Six Flags Great America	United States	16 May 2012	Operating
GateKeeper	Cedar Point	United States	11 May 2013	Operating
Parrot Coaster	Chimelong Ocean Kingdom	China	25 January 2014	Operating
Flug der Dämonen	Heide Park	Germany	29 March 2014	Operating
Thunderbird	Holiday World & Splashin' Safari	United States	25 April 2015	Operating
Flying Wing Coaster	Happy Valley Chongqing	China	8 July 2017	Operating
Wing Coaster	Colourful Yunnan Happy World	China	5 July 2018	Operating
Fēnix	Toverland	Netherlands	7 July 2018	Operating
Unknown	Hot Go Dreamworld	China	Unknown	SBNO
Heaven's Wing	Huayi Brothers Movie World	China	2018	Operating
Falcon	Wuxi Sunac Land	China	29 June 2019	Operating
Forest Predator	Happy Valley Nanjing	China	11 November 2020	Operating
DaVinci Ride	Fantasy Valley Xiangyang	China	29 April 2022	Operating
Maximus – Der Flug des Wächters	Legoland Deutschland	Germany	25 March 2023	Operating
Mandrill Mayhem	Chessington World Of Adventures	United Kingdom	15 May 2023	Operating
Rapterra	Kings Dominion	United States	29 March 2025	Operating
Rokan	Energylandia	Poland	2027	Under Construction

== Similar rides ==
Prior to the development of the Wing Coaster, in 2007, Intamin debuted a version of an Accelerator Coaster with modified trains similar to those used on 4th Dimension roller coasters and Wing Coasters. Known as a Wing Rider Coaster, Furius Baco at PortAventura Park was the first and currently only ride of its type. It launches riders from 0 to 135 kilometres per hour (84 mph) in 3.5 seconds with trains that seat six rows of four people (two on either side of the track).

In addition to the Wing Rider Coaster, Intamin also introduced a model named Wing Coaster. The first installation was Skyrush at Hersheypark in 2012, and the latest Flying Aces at Ferrari World Abu Dhabi. The trains feature four seats per row: two center seats positioned over the track and have a floor, while two hang over the side and are the "wings".

The Wing Coaster is also similar to the 4th Dimension roller coaster concept from the 1990s. However, unlike 4th Dimension roller coasters, cars on a Wing Coaster train do not spin — they are locked in place. Examples of 4th Dimension roller coasters include X2 at Six Flags Magic Mountain and Eejanaika at Fuji-Q Highland.
