= Wild Eagle =

Roller coaster at Dollywood

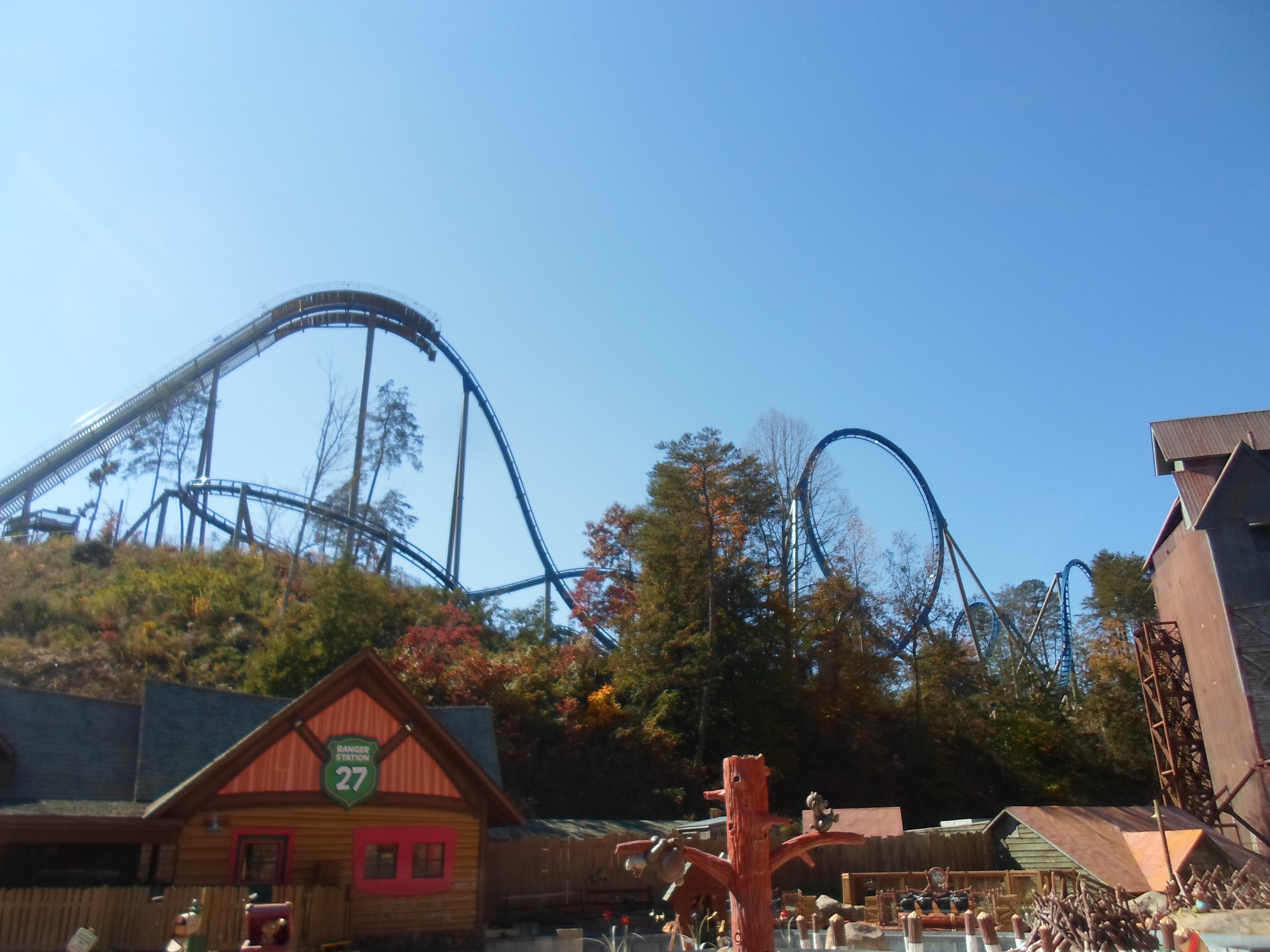
- Part of Wild Eagle's layout

Dollywood
- Location: Dollywood
- Park section: Wilderness Pass
- Coordinates: 35.794675°N 83.530127°W
- Status: Operating
- Soft opening date: March 23, 2012
- Opening date: March 24, 2012
- Cost: $20,000,000 ($28 million in 2025 dollars)

General statistics
- Type: Steel – Wing Coaster
- Manufacturer: Bolliger & Mabillard
- Model: Wing Coaster
- Lift/launch system: Chain lift hill
- Drop: 135 ft (41 m)
- Length: 3,127 ft (953 m)
- Speed: 61 mph (98 km/h)
- Inversions: 4
- Duration: 2:22
- Height restriction: 50–78 in (127–198 cm)
- Trains: 2 trains with 7 cars; riders arranged 4 across in a single row for a total of 28 riders per train
- TimeSaver Pass available
- Must transfer from wheelchair
- Wild Eagle at RCDB

Wild Eagle is a steel Wing Coaster built by Bolliger & Mabillard at the Dollywood amusement park in Pigeon Forge, Tennessee. It is the first of its kind in the United States and opened to the media on March 23, 2012 before opening to the public on March 24, 2012. The roller coaster reaches a height of 210 feet (64 m) and reaches speeds of 61 miles per hour (98 km/h). In September 2012, the ride was voted as the best new ride of 2012 in Amusement Today's Golden Ticket Awards.

== History ==
Speculation of Wild Eagle began in March 2011 when plans to discuss Dollywood's 2012 attraction were submitted to the Pigeon Forge Planning Commission. On March 24, 2011, those plans were approved and though city officials could not tell exactly what the plans were, some believed it looked to be a roller coaster. By early June, blue Bolliger & Mabillard roller coaster track pieces had already arrived at Dollywood. On September 4, 2011, Wild Eagle was officially announced to the public as the first wing coaster to open in the United States. On October 7, 2011, the lift hill was completed, and by the end of October 2011, the track layout was complete. On February 28, 2012, Dollywood unveiled a steel sculpture of an eagle with a wing span of 42 feet (13 m) and a total weight of 8,000 pounds (3,600 kg) that would be placed near the entrance of the ride. The ride soft opened to the media on March 23, 2012, before officially opening to the public on March 24, 2012.

== Experience ==
...There's nothing above you and nothing below you. You can fly like an eagle.

— Dolly Parton

After departing from the station, the train makes a left turn leading into the 210-foot (64 m) chain lift hill. Once at the top, the train drops 135 feet (41 m), reaching a top speed of 61 mph (98 km/h). The train enters a 110-foot (34 m) vertical loop followed by a slight left, then into a zero-gravity roll where riders experience the feeling of weightlessness. Upon exiting the roll, the train immediately enters an immelmann loop. The train then goes through a trim brake, before entering a corkscrew, then a camelback hill which is a common way of achieving air-time on roller coasters. The train then makes a sharp left turn before making a sharp right turn which leads into the brake run. The train then makes a left turn into another set of brakes before entering the station where the next riders board the train. One cycle of the ride lasts about 2 minutes and 22 seconds.

=== Trains ===
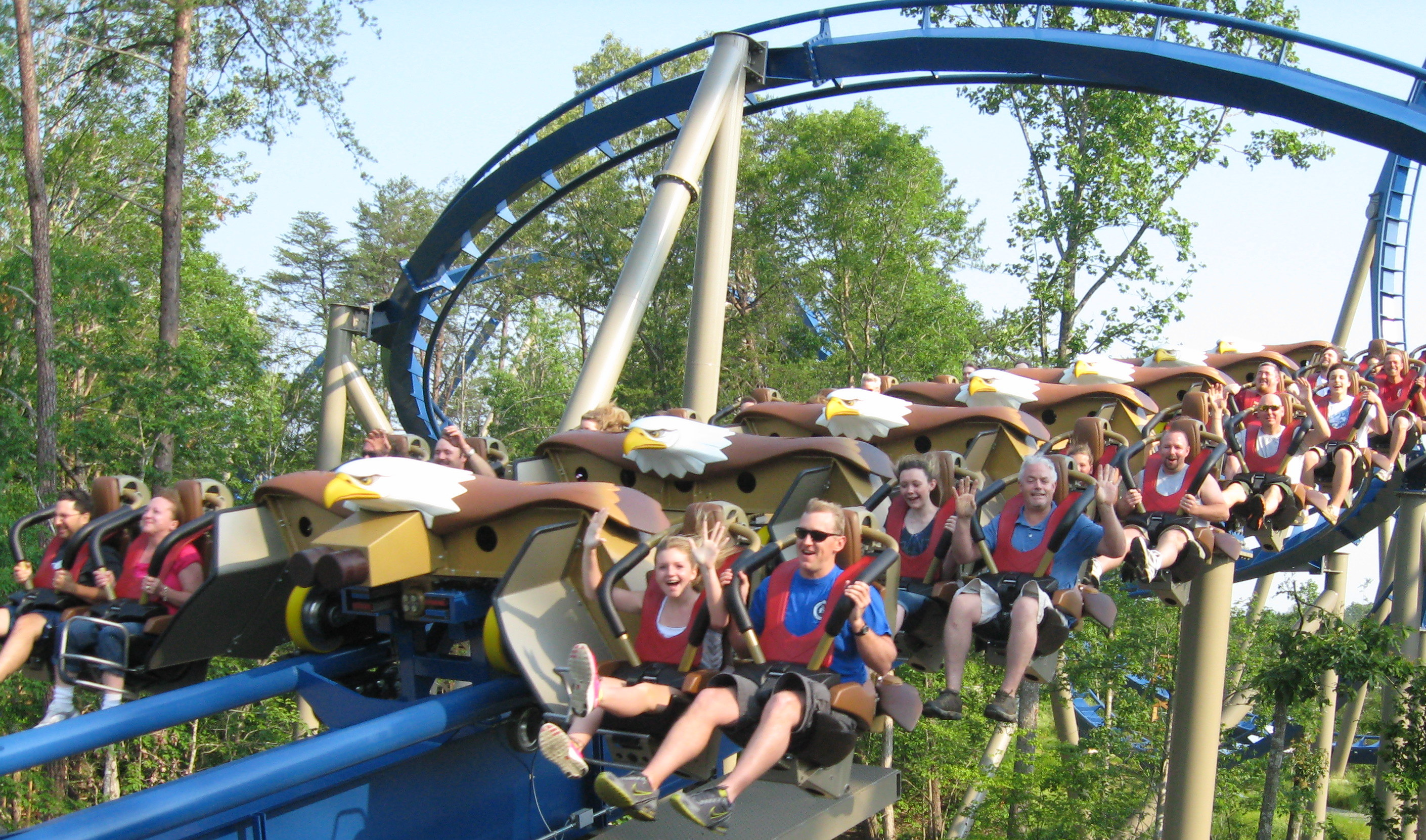
One of Wild Eagle's trains entering the brake run.

Wild Eagle operates with two open-air steel and fiberglass trains, each with seven cars which have four seats each, with two on each side of the track for a total of 28 riders per train. Riders are restrained by flexible over-the-shoulder restraints and interlocking seat belts. Also, because the seats are on the side of the track, a cantilevered steel arm is used to support the wings. The front of each of the seven train cars is shaped to resemble an eagle with outstretched wings adding to the theme of the ride.

=== Track ===
The steel track is 3,127 feet (953 m) in length and the height of the lift is approximately 210 feet (64 m). The track is painted blue and the supports are painted tan. Both friction and magnetic brakes are used on the roller coaster to control the trains' speed.

== Reception ==
Joel Bullock from The Coaster Critic gave Wild Eagle a nine out of ten for its unique experience. He also stated that, "It's smooth, has some fun inversions, and is meant to be a wide-reaching crowd pleaser and it fully delivered" but mentions that the restraints can become uncomfortable from time to time.

In Amusement Today's Golden Ticket Awards, the roller coaster was voted as the best new attraction for 2012 and 15th best roller steel roller coaster in the world. In Mitch Hawker's worldwide Best Roller Coaster Poll, the ride placed 87th.

Golden Ticket Awards: Best New Ride For 2012
| Year | 2012 |
|---|---|
| Ranking | 1 |

Golden Ticket Awards: Top steel Roller Coasters
| Year | | | | | | | | | 1998 | 1999 |
|---|---|---|---|---|---|---|---|---|---|---|
| Ranking | | | | | | | | | – | – |
| Year | 2000 | 2001 | 2002 | 2003 | 2004 | 2005 | 2006 | 2007 | 2008 | 2009 |
| Ranking | – | – | – | – | – | – | – | – | – | – |
| Year | 2010 | 2011 | 2012 | 2013 | 2014 | 2015 | 2016 | 2017 | 2018 | 2019 |
| Ranking | – | – | 15 | 24 | 28 (tie) | 31 | 36 | – | – | – |
| Year | 2020 | 2021 | 2022 | 2023 | 2024 | 2025 | 2026 | | | |
| Ranking | N/A | – | – | – | – | – | – | | | |

== See also ==
- 2012 in amusement parks
- X-Flight, a Bolliger & Mabillard Wing Coaster at Six Flags Great America
- The Swarm, a Bolliger & Mabillard Wing Coaster at Thorpe Park
