= Raptor (Gardaland) =

Steel roller coaster at Gardaland

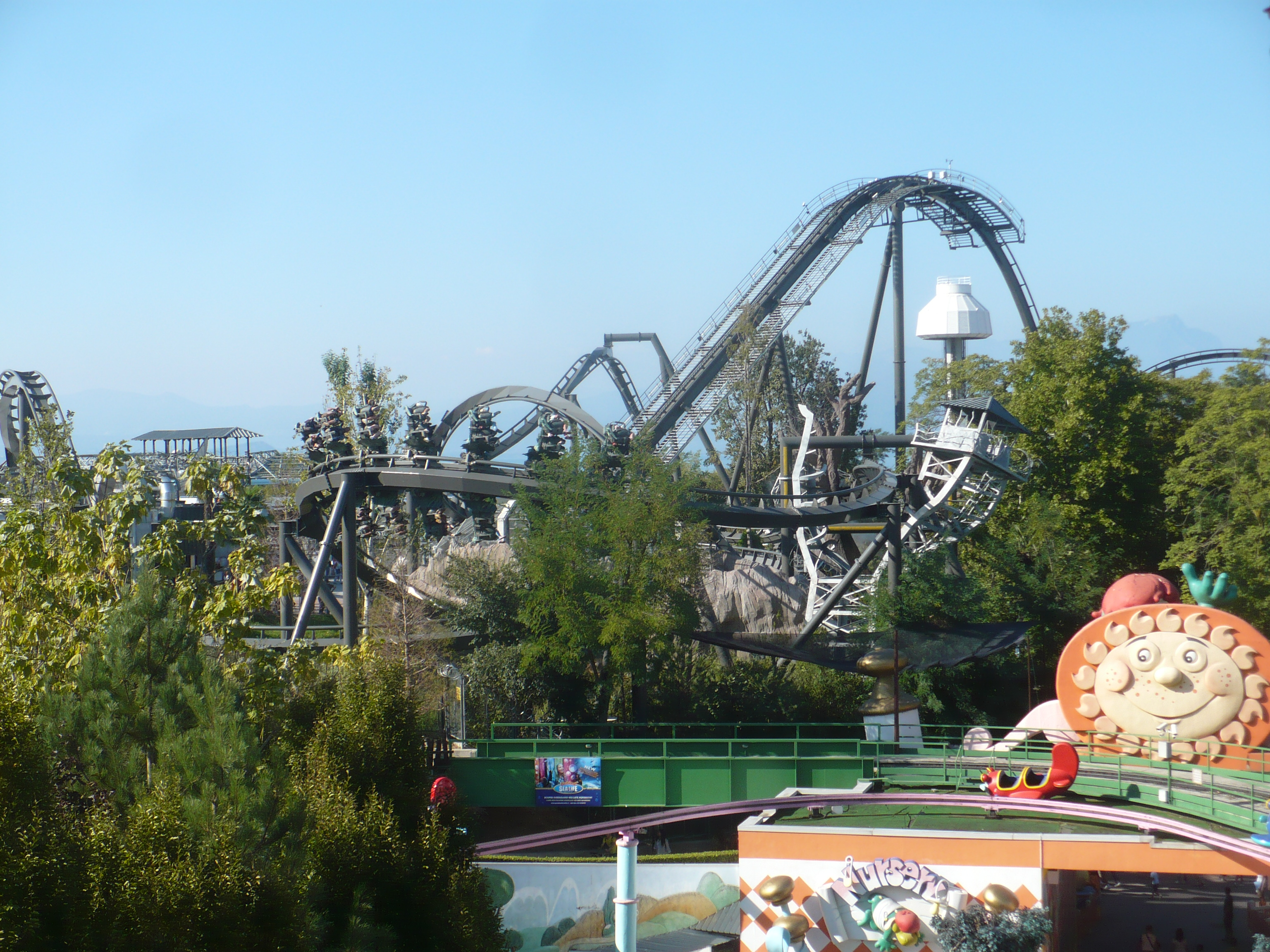
- Part of Raptor's layout

Gardaland Italy
- Location: Gardaland Italy
- Coordinates: 45.457056°N 10.711949°E
- Status: Operating
- Opening date: April 1, 2011

General statistics
- Type: Steel – Wing Coaster
- Manufacturer: Bolliger & Mabillard
- Model: Wing Coaster
- Track layout: Twister
- Lift/launch system: Chain lift hill
- Height: 108.3 ft (33.0 m)
- Length: 2,526.3 ft (770.0 m)
- Speed: 90 km/h (56 mph)
- Inversions: 3 (Corkscrew, Zero-G Roll, Inline Twist)
- Duration: 1 minute and 30 seconds
- Max vertical angle: 65°
- Height restriction: 140–195 cm (4 ft 7 in – 6 ft 5 in)
- Trains: 2 trains with 7 cars; riders arranged 4 across in a single row for a total of 28 riders per train
- Raptor at RCDB

Raptor is a steel roller coaster at the Gardaland amusement park in Lake Garda, Italy. The ride is a prototype Wing Coaster design by Swiss roller coaster manufacturer Bolliger & Mabillard. Raptor opened to the public on April 1, 2011. The ride begins from an underground station and features two water splash elements. The layout features several roll overs.

== Ride experience ==
After departing from the underground station, the train makes a left turn into the lift hill. After reaching the top of the 108.3-foot (33.0 m) lift, the train drops back to the ground before making a sharp left over-banked turn. The train then enters a corkscrew followed by a slight upward left turn. Next, the train goes back down slightly, also going through a set of trim brakes. The train then makes another sharp left turn leading into a 55.8-foot (17.0 m) zero-gravity-roll. After a sharp left turn, and right turn, the train enters a 32.8-foot (10.0 m) inline twist, going through the supports of the track, a fake tree and a steel rectangle. The train then makes a left turn into the final brake run where the train then enters the station and the next riders board.

The ride lasts about 1 minute and 30 seconds.

== See also ==
- 2011 in amusement parks
