= The Swarm (roller coaster) =

Roller coaster at Thorpe Park

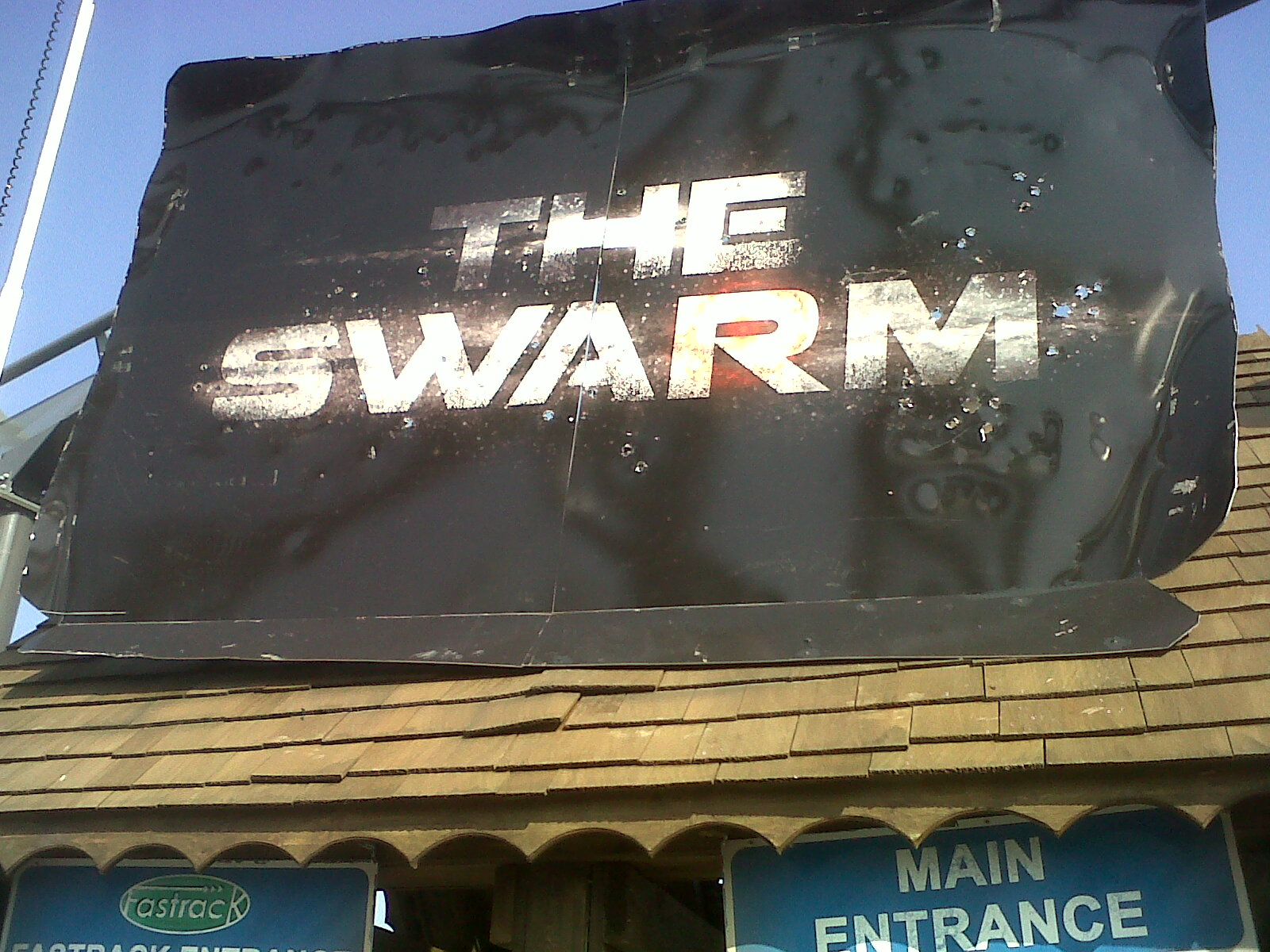

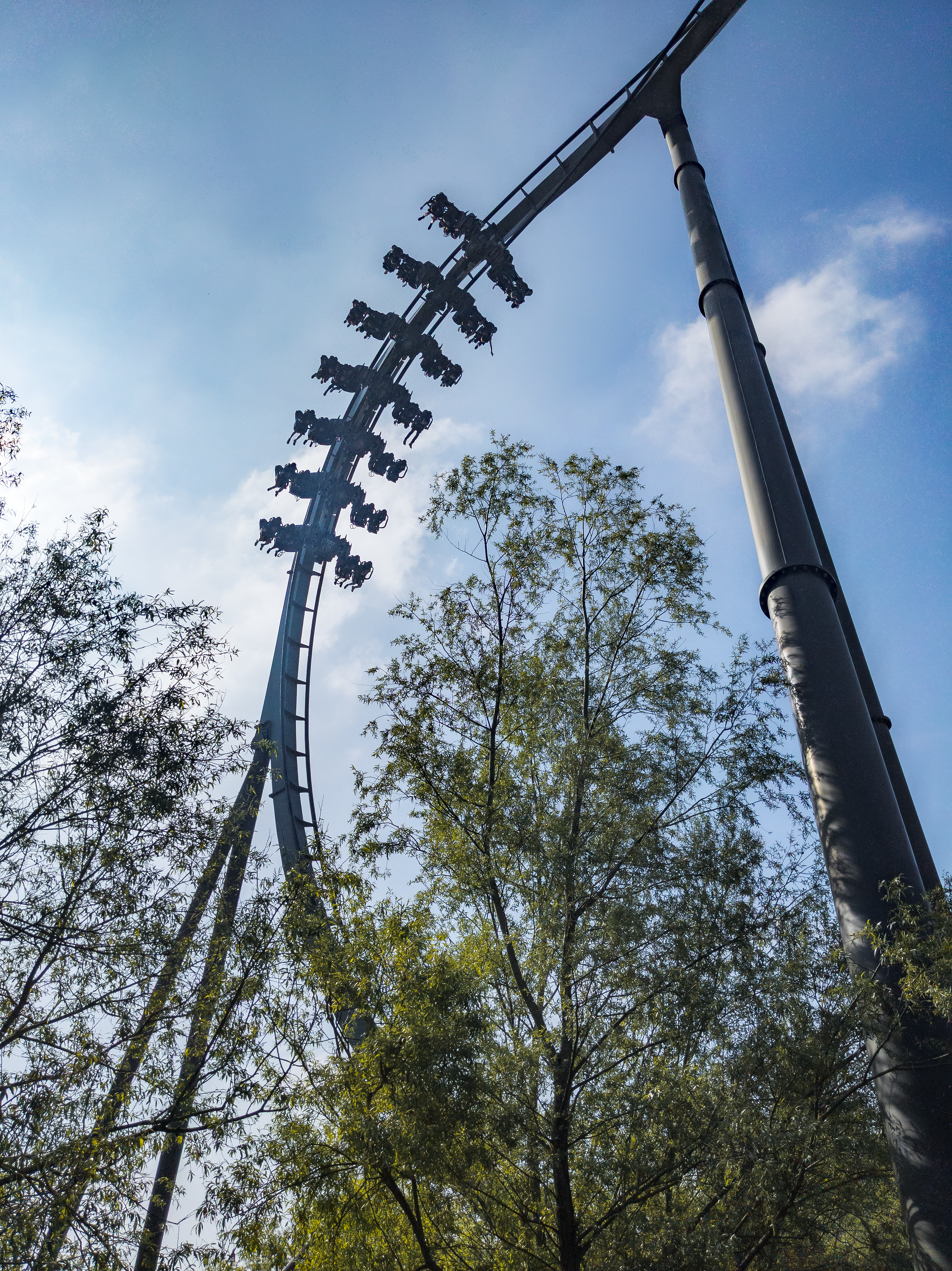
- The dive drop of The Swarm

Thorpe Park
- Location: Thorpe Park
- Park section: Swarm Island
- Coordinates: 51°24′20″N 0°30′55.5″W
- Status: Operating
- Opening date: 15 March 2012
- Cost: £20 million

General statistics
- Type: Steel – Wing Coaster
- Manufacturer: Bolliger & Mabillard
- Model: Custom
- Lift/launch system: Chain lift hill
- Height: 38.6 m (127 ft)
- Length: 775 m (2,543 ft)
- Speed: 59 mph (95 km/h)
- Inversions: 4
- G-force: 4.5
- Height restriction: 140–196 cm (4 ft 7 in – 6 ft 5 in)
- Trains: 7 cars; riders arranged 4 across in a single row for a total of 28 riders per train
- Website: Official website
- Fastrack available
- Wheelchair accessible
- The Swarm at RCDB

The Swarm is a steel roller coaster located at Thorpe Park in the United Kingdom. The Swarm was the world's second Wing Coaster model designed by Swiss roller coaster manufacturer Bolliger & Mabillard and the first one located in the United Kingdom. Construction commenced in May 2011, and the coaster opened on 15 March 2012.

Between 2013 and 2015, the rear two rows of each train were reconfigured to face backwards, while the first five rows continued to face forwards. This modification was accompanied by the promotional slogan “Brave It Backwards.” All rows on the trains were returned to their original forward-facing configuration in 2016.

The 2,543-foot-long (775 m) ride stands 127 feet (39 m) tall and features four inversions along with a heavily-banked left turn. Riders experience speeds of up to 59 mph (95 km/h) and 4.5 times the force of gravity. A marketing campaign for the ride dubbed LC12 - The End is Coming began eleven months before The Swarm opened to the public. It has generally been well received and was briefly ranked 30th among steel coasters in the 2015 Golden Ticket Awards, an annual publication from Amusement Today.

== History ==
In 2010, planning for The Swarm began behind closed doors. The ride was codenamed Project LC12 in the early process of its planning and construction. On 31 January 2011, Thorpe Park submitted a planning application for their 2012 ride to the Runnymede Borough Council. The website gave further information about the new ride's theme, that of an apocalyptic battle.

At the time of the ride's announcement construction was already underway. The track for The Swarm was complete by 18 November 2011. Clearance testing started almost immediately; the first operational test run was completed on 17 January 2012.

On 15 March 2012, The Swarm officially opened to the public. In January 2013, Thorpe Park announced that the last two rows on The Swarm would be rotated to face backwards for 2013, a first for a Wing Coaster. The park's tag line for this experience is 'THE SWARM- Brave It Backwards'. The park additionally announced that they were adding a damaged, mangled billboard, which the train travels through. In 2016, the seats were returned to all facing forwards.

== Characteristics ==
=== Location ===
The Swarm is located on a reclaimed island adjacent to the Stealth roller coaster, with parts of the ride built over water. A bridge links the core of Thorpe Park to an island which hosts the roller coaster station, merchandise outlet, a games zone and toilet buildings.

=== Trains ===
The Swarm features two 28-seat Bolliger & Mabillard Wing Coaster trains. Each train is made up of seven rows of four seats each. One pair of seats in each row is located on either side of the ride's track and slightly lower than the track, This Wing Coaster. has trains themed to resemble alien-like drones (the ride's eponymous "Swarm"), with a number of red LED lights placed across the train.

=== Theme ===
The area is designed to appear as if it has been partially destroyed by the Swarm. The ride recreates the experience of flying through a crash scene and features a partially destroyed church, crashed aeroplane, upturned ambulance, half-submerged fire engine and a damaged helicopter, devastated by a swarm of semi-organic mechanical creatures whose wings carry riders.

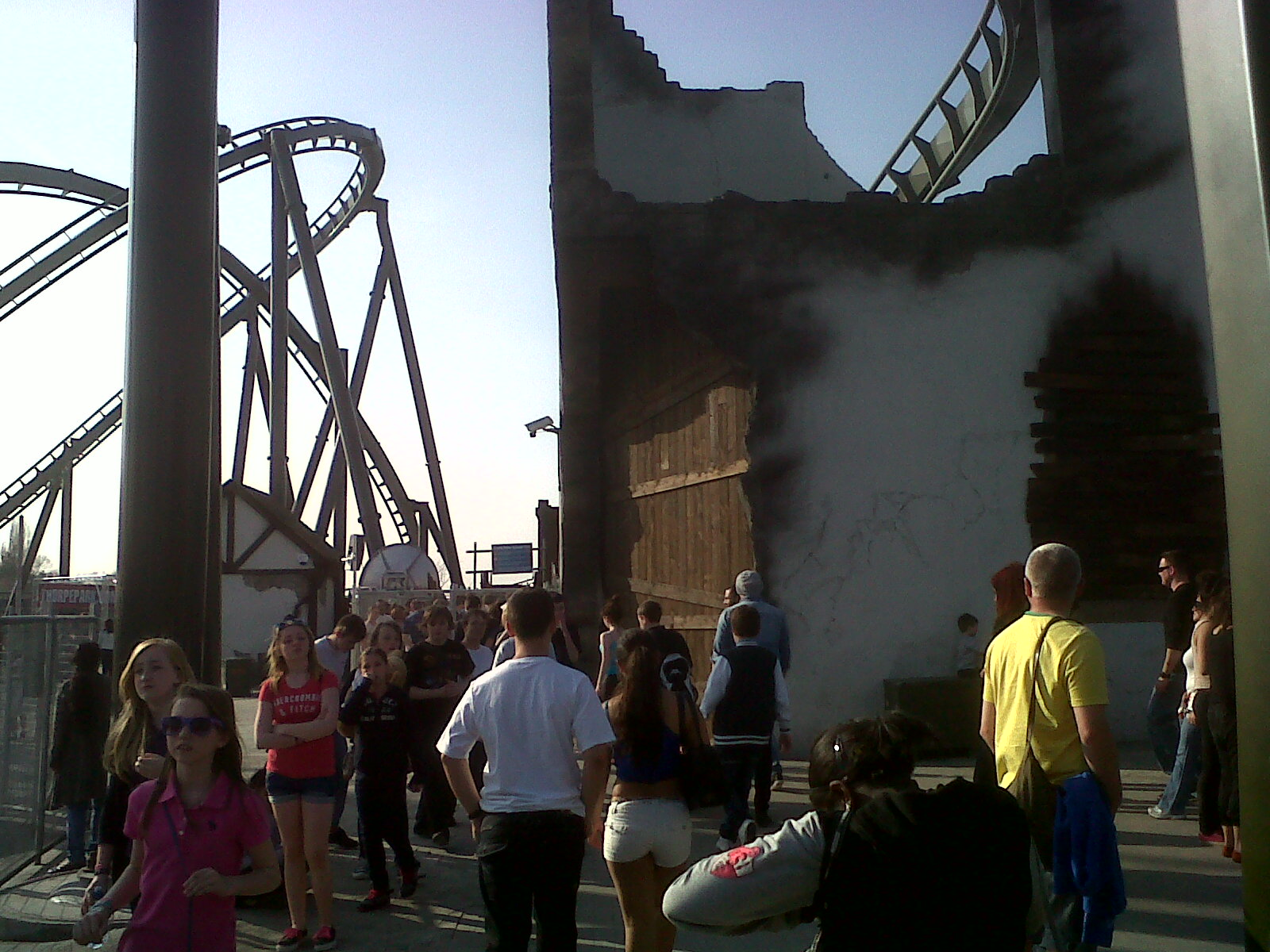
Part of The Swarm's destroyed church

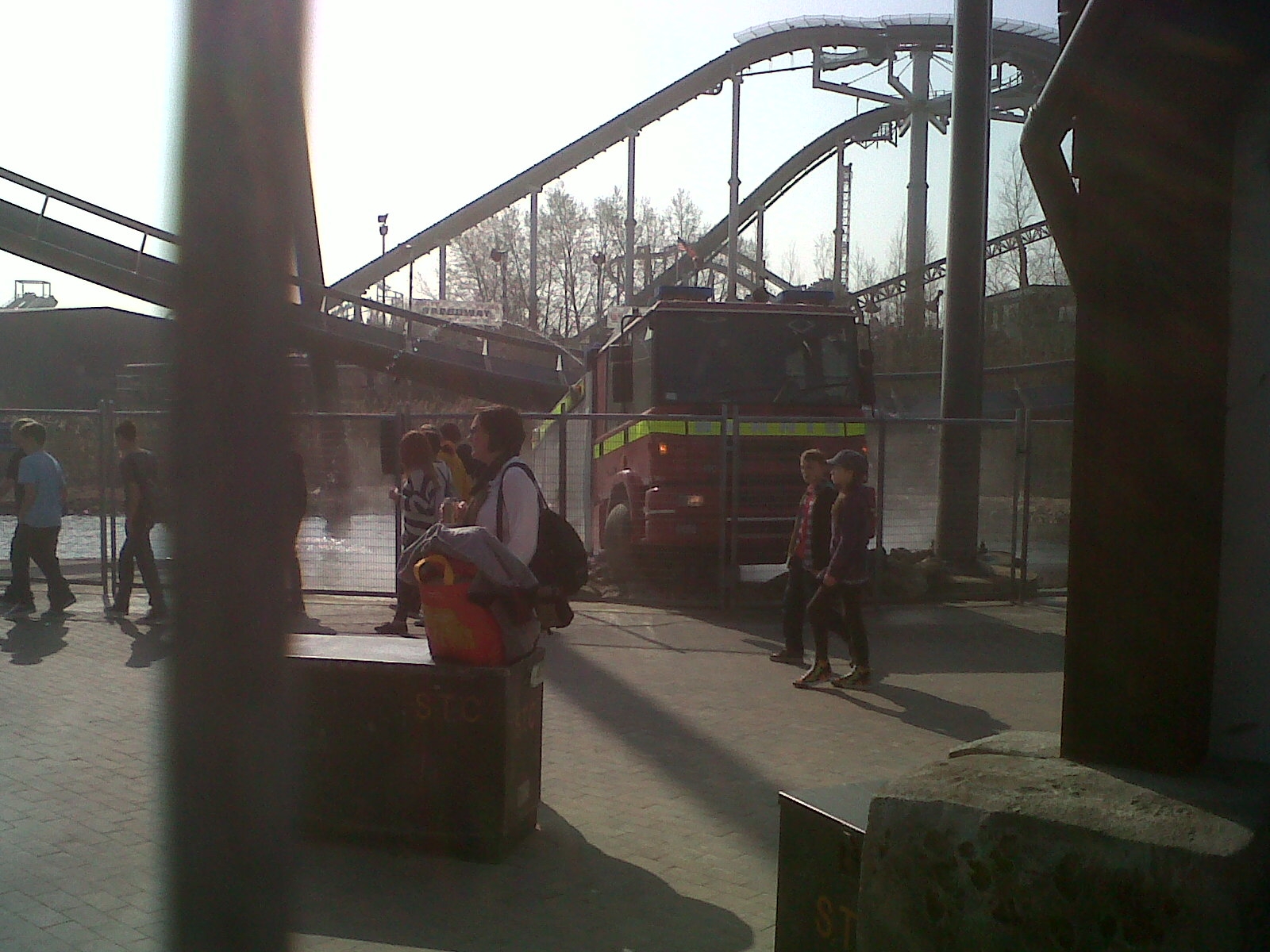
A partially submerged fire engine in the area surrounding the ride

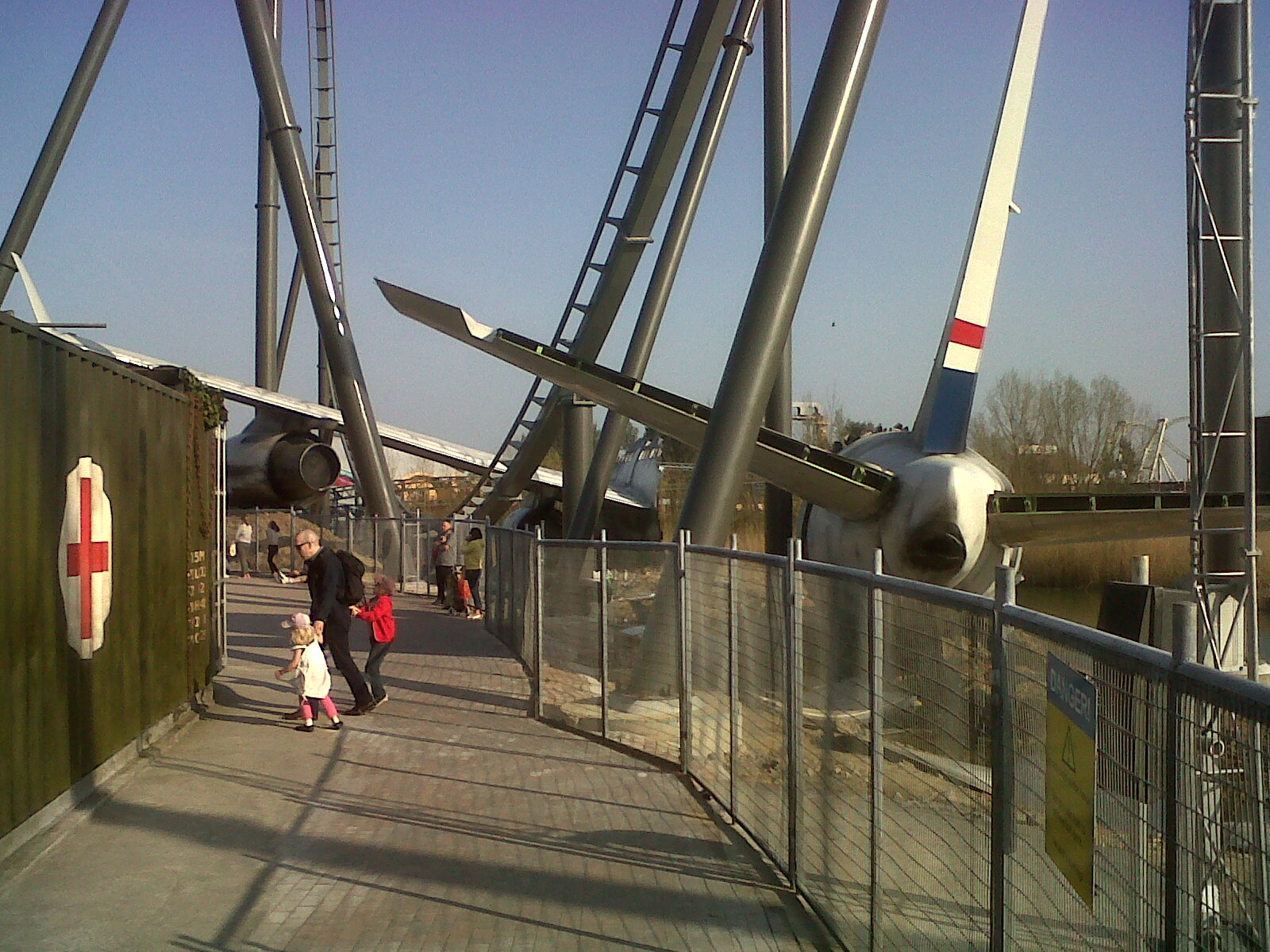
The plane crash featured in the ride

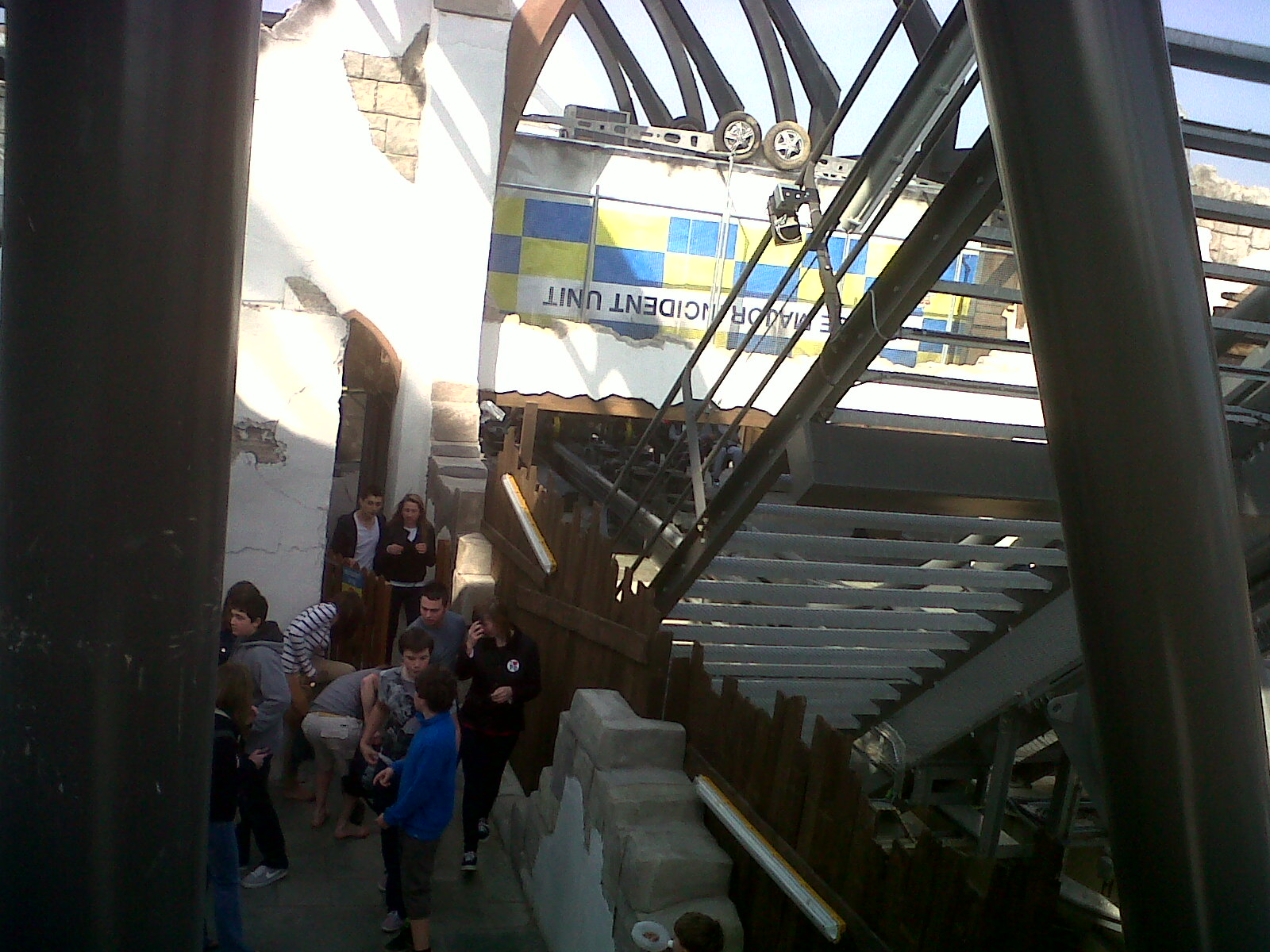
The overturned police major incident control van (also the ride's control centre).

== Ride experience ==
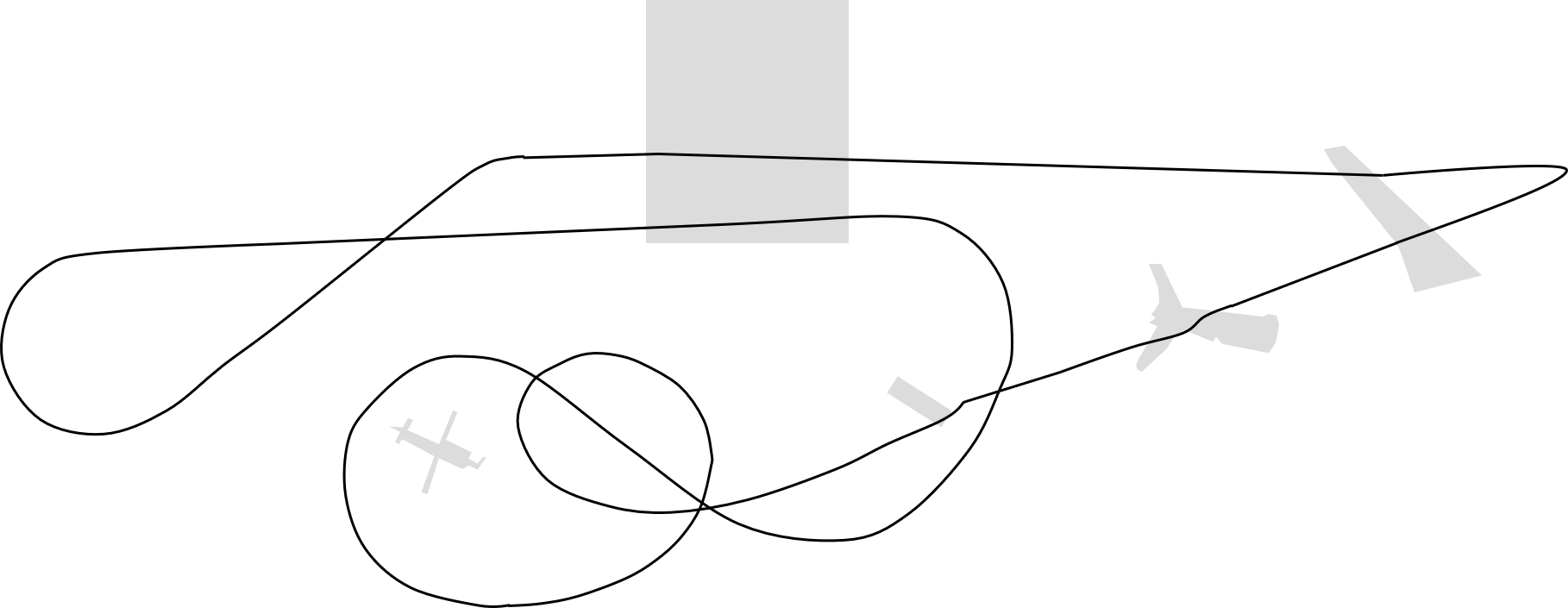
Track layout

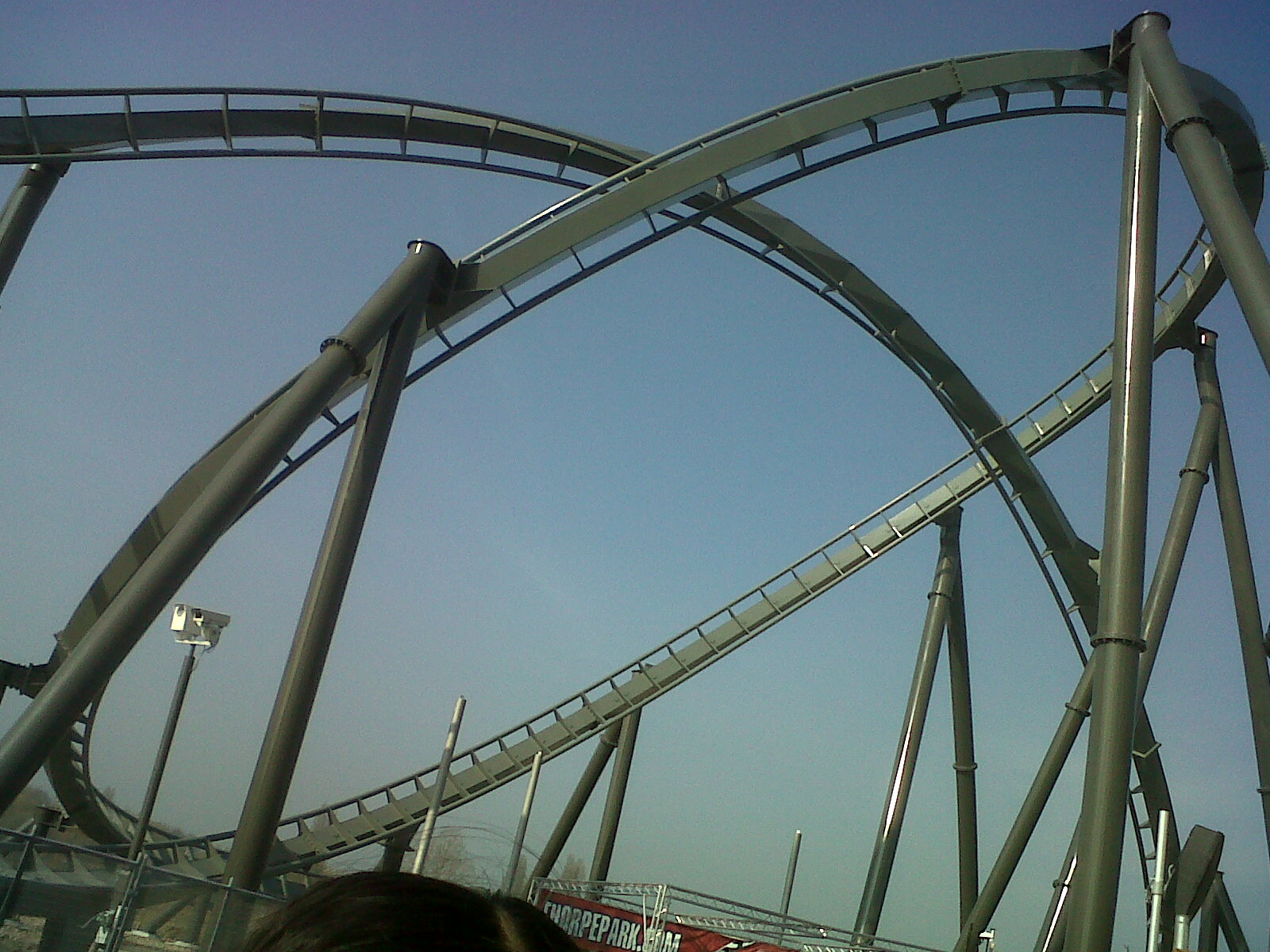
The inclined loop and corkscrew featured in the ride

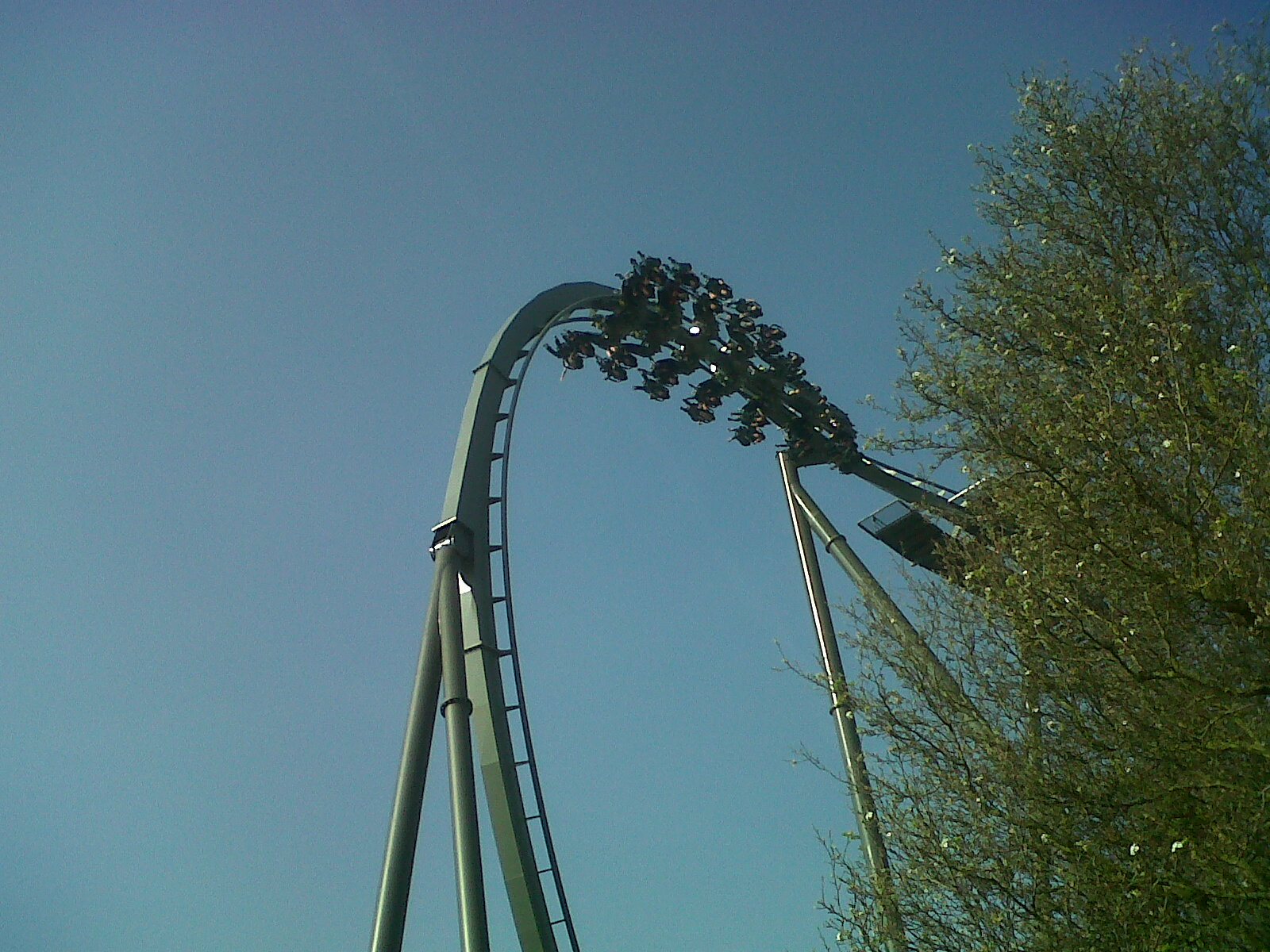
The ride's first drop

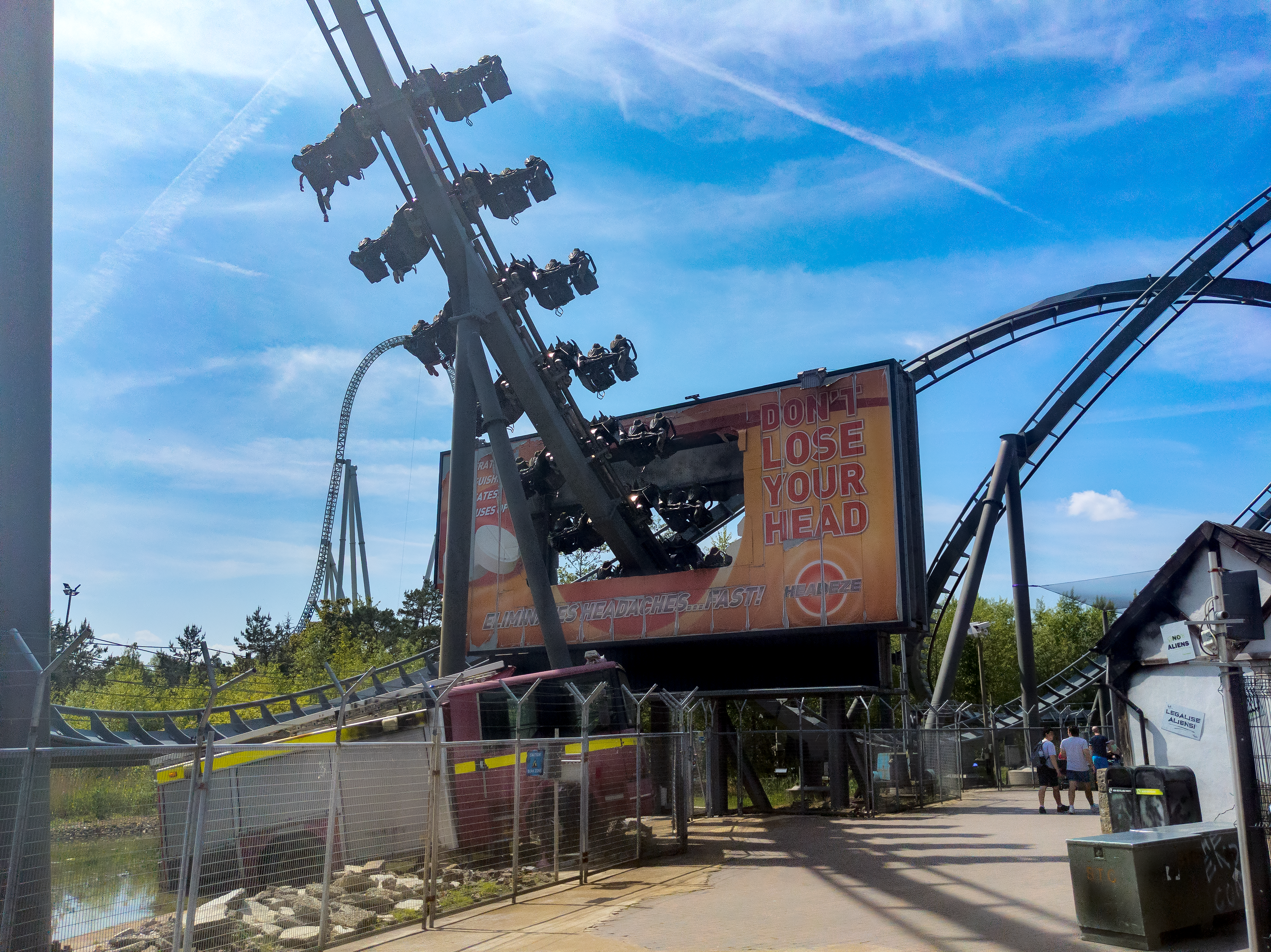
A Swarm train going through a headchopper element

The roller coaster begins in the station, which is built to look like a partially destroyed church with an upturned police trailer housing the ride operators, and climbs up a 38.7-metre (127 ft) chain lift hill. Upon reaching the top of the lift hill, the track twists 180 degrees anticlockwise, so that riders are upside down, before plunging down the world's first dive drop element. The train then proceeds to dive under the wing of a wrecked plane and into a zero-g roll 30.6 metres (100 ft) above the ground before passing narrowly through a themed billboard, immediately following which the on-ride photo is taken. It then enters an inclined loop 23 metres (75 ft) in height. The ride continues into a turnaround featuring a wrecked helicopter with slow-spinning rotor blades in the centre. At this point riders on the right hand side of the train experience a near miss with the water surrounding the helicopter. This is followed by a corkscrew, which passes through the inclined loop. Upon leaving the corkscrew, the train curves past a crashed fire engine with water and fire effects and proceeds through a keyhole: a partly destroyed church tower. The ride then flies over the station and enters into a last inline twist before a mid-course brake run. Following this, the train makes a banked left-hand turn (which despite being directly after a brake run, can generate strong forces for riders on the rear-right of the train) into the final brakes. The train then goes back into the station. The ride previously featured an on-ride video camera, filming riders and allowing the purchase of a DVD afterwards; this was removed sometime in 2016.

== Marketing ==
In late April 2011, Thorpe Park began an advertising campaign for LC12 consisting of "The end is coming" posters in the park and a teaser website, LC12.net. The LC12.net website featured a brief description hinting at the possible theme of the ride alongside a countdown until 1 August 2011. As the date of the ride's announcement approached, Thorpe Park released a video via Facebook stating that "WAR is coming".

On 25 January 2012, it was reported that an incident occurred when testing The Swarm. Limbs of test dummies were broken off when the ride passed an object that was located too close to the track.

In March 2012, Thorpe Park announced it had contracted the band You Me at Six to create the world's first roller coaster single for the launch of The Swarm. The song, "The Swarm", was released on iTunes on 18 March 2012, a few days after the opening of the roller coaster. The song entered the UK Singles Charts at number 23.

== Reception ==
Blogger Nick Sim of Theme Park Tourist praised the attraction, saying that it packs "a number of incredible elements into its compact circuit". Sim stated the ride had "fallen just short of our sky-high expectations" mainly because of "its short ride time". He rated the ride 4 out of 5. Joanna Churchill of the Daily Mirror gave a review of the backwards ride, stating that it is "a whole new adrenaline-pumped experience that is simply not for the faint-hearted". Churchill stated that her "blood pressure and heart rate went through the roof", but "there was barely time to process what was happening before we were back on terra firma".

In Mitch Hawker's worldwide Best Roller Coaster Poll, The Swarm debuted at position 68 out of the 365 roller coasters in the poll. When compared with other Wing Coasters debuting in the 2012 poll, The Swarm performed fairly well; X-Flight at Six Flags Great America ranked 58, Wild Eagle at Dollywood ranked 87, and Raptor at Gardaland ranked 113. It did not place in Amusement Today's Golden Ticket Awards in 2012, 2013 and 2014, but made its first appearance in 2015 ranked at 30.

Golden Ticket Awards: Top steel Roller Coasters
Year									1998	1999
Ranking									–	–
Year	2000	2001	2002	2003	2004	2005	2006	2007	2008	2009
Ranking	–	–	–	–	–	–	–	–	–	–
Year	2010	2011	2012	2013	2014	2015	2016	2017	2018	2019
Ranking	–	–	NR	NR	NR	30	–	–	–	–
Year	2020	2021	2022	2023	2024	2025	2026			
Ranking	N/A	–	–	–	–	–	–			

== See also ==
- 2012 in amusement parks
- Merlin Entertainments
