= X-Flight =

Roller coaster in Gurnee, Illinois

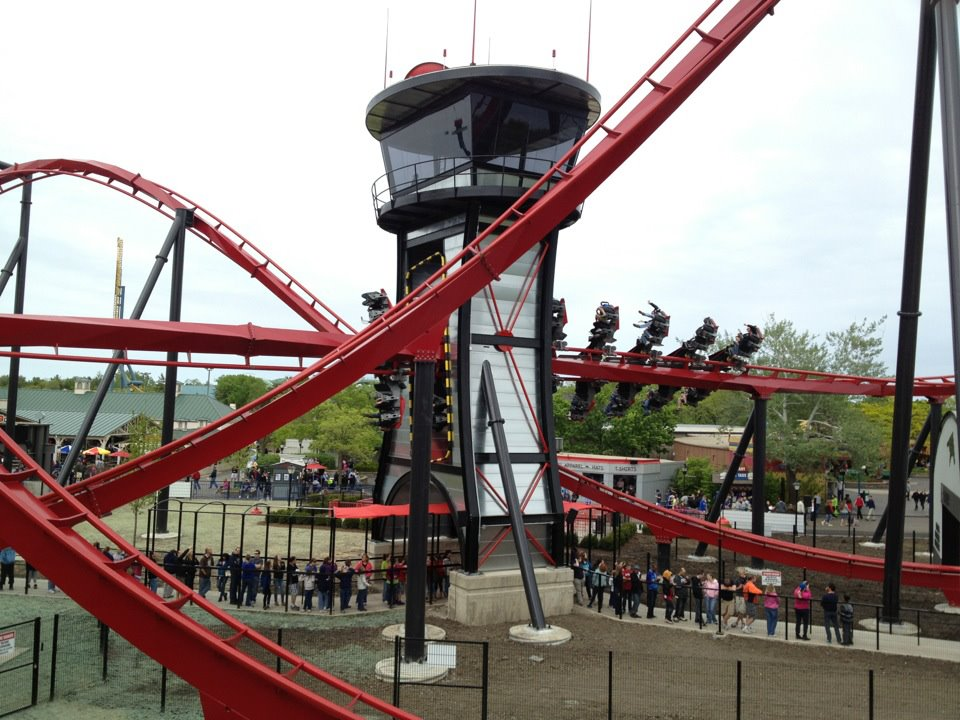
- X-Flight train going through the "Keyhole"

Six Flags Great America
- Location: Six Flags Great America
- Park section: County Fair
- Coordinates: 42°21′55.57″N 87°56′1.63″W
- Status: Operating
- Soft opening date: May 12, 2012
- Opening date: May 16, 2012
- Cost: $12–15 million
- Replaced: Splashwater Falls; Great America Raceway

General statistics
- Type: Steel – Wing Coaster
- Manufacturer: Bolliger & Mabillard
- Model: Wing Coaster
- Track layout: Twister
- Lift/launch system: Chain lift hill
- Height: 120 ft (37 m)
- Length: 3,000 ft (910 m)
- Speed: 55 mph (89 km/h)
- Inversions: 5
- Duration: 1:15
- Height restriction: 52–78 in (132–198 cm)
- Trains: 2 trains with 8 cars; riders arranged 4 across in a single row for a total of 32 riders per train
- Website: Official website
- Fast Lane available
- Must transfer from wheelchair
- X-Flight at RCDB

X-Flight is a steel roller coaster located at Six Flags Great America in Gurnee, Illinois. Designed and built by Bolliger & Mabillard, the ride opened as the fourth Wing Coaster in the world and the second in the United States on May 16, 2012. It replaced both the Splashwater Falls and Great American Raceway attractions. The 3,000-foot-long (910 m) roller coaster features barrel rolls, high-speed drops, and a signature fly-through element, where the train narrowly misses a custom-built air traffic control tower structure as it passes through an opening known as a keyhole element.

== History ==
X-Flight was announced on September 1, 2011. Six Flags Great America was the first park to announce plans for a Wing Coaster in the United States. Land clearing started that same month on the former site of Splashwater Falls and the Great America Raceway. The first pieces of the track began to arrive in early October. 127 Caissons (footers), ranging from 30 feet (9.1 m) to 77 feet (23 m) were dug into the ground. On January 27, 2012, the final piece of the lift hill was topped off. The trains for X-Flight arrived at the park on March 2, 2012. In a Chicago Sun-Times article in February, the park said they expect safety tests to start in early April. A soft opening media preview event was held on May 10, 2012. X-Flight opened for "Xclusive season pass holders" on the weekend of May 12 and then to the public on May 16, 2012. X-Flight originally opened with a 54" height restriction. In 2024, this was changed from 54" to 52".

== Ride experience ==
... It'll be like riding on the wing of a plane.

— Gary Pohlman, Director of maintenance/construction

After departing from the station, which resembles an airplane hangar, the train immediately begins to climb the steep 120-foot (37 m) chain lift hill. Upon reaching the top of the lift hill, the train enters the first element of the roller coaster, a Dive Drop. This element is similar to the Dive Drop's found on The Swarm at Thorpe Park and GateKeeper at Cedar Point and consists of the train rotating 180 degrees into an upside down position before descending back to the ground. During this drop, the train reaches its top speed of 55 miles per hour (89 km/h). At the bottom of the first drop, riders get their picture taken. After the train exits the first drop, the train then enters a zero-g-roll before going through a cloud of fog. The train then makes a slight left turn before entering an Immelmann loop followed by a right turn over a pond. The train then leads into the second zero-g-roll over the main entrance of the ride. Following the roll, the train makes a left turn before going through an Inline twist. During this element, which is known as a keyhole, riders go through an airplane control tower, giving the illusion the train will hit the tower. Contrary to popular belief, this control tower was built custom for the ride by ACME Construction Metals in Kenosha, Wisconsin. After going through the tower, the train goes through another near miss keyhole surrounded by a cloud of fog, before exiting the twist and making a tight right turn, passing by Demon's corkscrews and last turn, before making a slight left upward turn leading into the Main Brake. The train then makes a 180-degree left turn into the slowdown brake and the transfer track before entering the station. One cycle lasts about 1 minute and 15 seconds.

== Characteristics ==
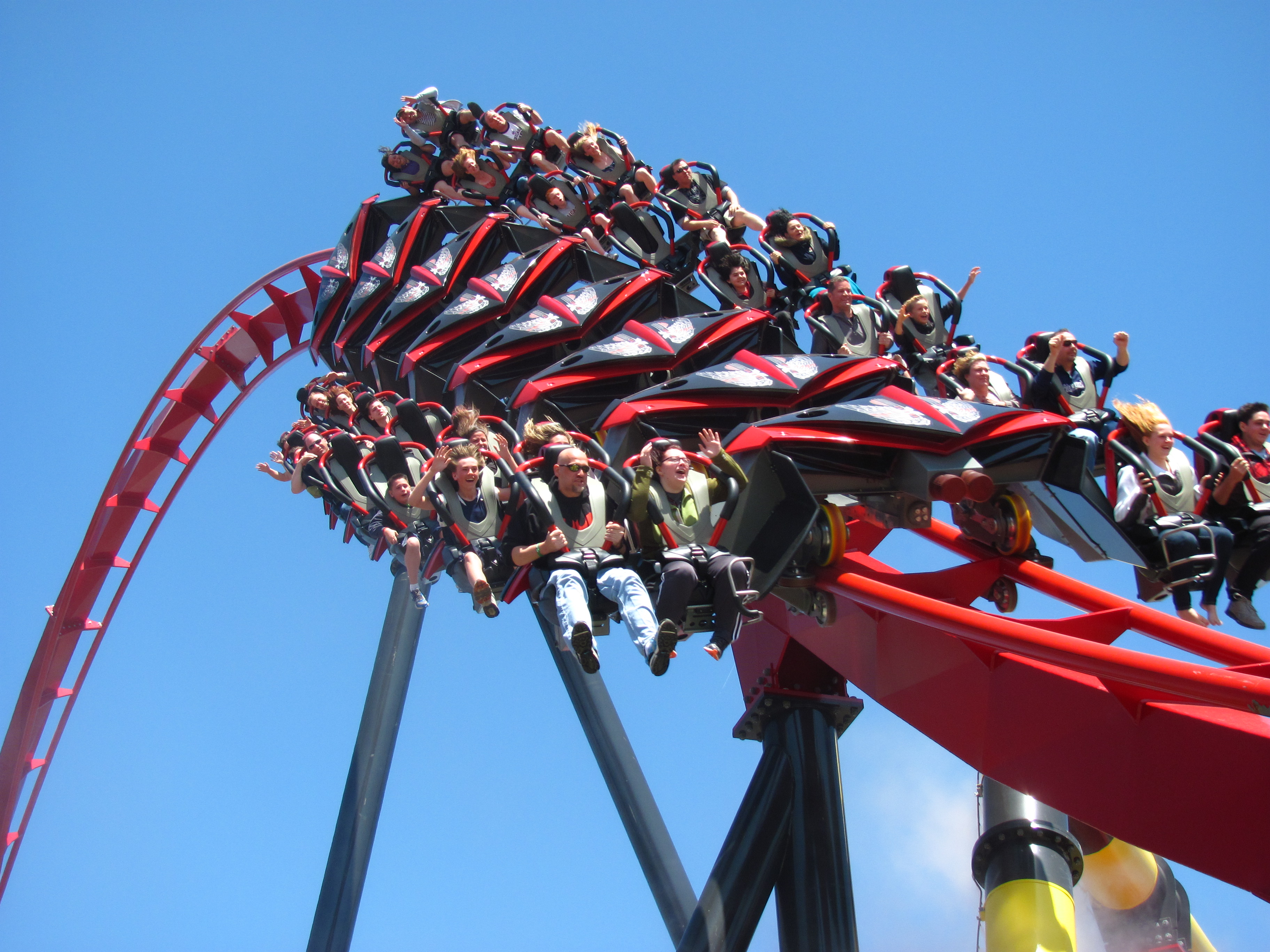
X-Flight train

=== Manufacturer ===
X-Flight is a Wing Coaster model from Swiss manufacturer, Bolliger & Mabillard. It was the fifth B&M coaster for Six Flags Great America. X Flight joins the inverted roller coaster, Batman: The Ride, the hyper-twister, Raging Bull, the flying roller coaster, Superman: Ultimate Flight, and the dive coaster Wrath of Rakshasa. The park's first B&M coaster, Iron Wolf, was moved to Six Flags America at the end of the 2011 season. X-Flight was the fourth Wing Coaster built and the second in the United States, preceded by Wild Eagle at Dollywood.

=== Trains ===
X-Flight operates with two steel and fiberglass trains. Each train has eight cars with four seats per car (two on each side of the track) for a total of 32 riders per train. The colors of the train are red and black with over-the-shoulder restraints. The restraints are similar to the restraints found on Superman: Ultimate Flight and Wrath of Rakshasa.

=== Track ===
The steel track is approximately 3,000 feet (910 m) in length and the height of the lift is approximately 120 feet (37 m). The track is colored red while the supports are black.

== Reception ==
X-Flight has received mostly positive reviews. Doug George from the Chicago Tribune stated the ride is very smooth with "rolls, dives and inverted, eye-bugging flips." However, he stated that the ride is pretty short and with only one train running the course at a time, the wait time can reach as long as other popular attractions at the park. The Coaster Critic reviewed the ride and stated that the theming is very well done, especially the keyhole element. He said the different seating set up encourages re-rides because of the different experience on each side of the train. Overall, he gave the ride a 9 out of 10 because of the "riding position, loops, and interactions or near-misses."

== Awards ==
Golden Ticket Awards: Top steel Roller Coasters
| Year | | | | | | | | | 1998 | 1999 |
|---|---|---|---|---|---|---|---|---|---|---|
| Ranking | | | | | | | | | – | – |
| Year | 2000 | 2001 | 2002 | 2003 | 2004 | 2005 | 2006 | 2007 | 2008 | 2009 |
| Ranking | – | – | – | – | – | – | – | – | – | – |
| Year | 2010 | 2011 | 2012 | 2013 | 2014 | 2015 | 2016 | 2017 | 2018 | 2019 |
| Ranking | – | – | – | 45 (tie) | – | – | – | – | – | – |
| Year | 2020 | 2021 | 2022 | 2023 | 2024 | 2025 | 2026 | | | |
| Ranking | N/A | – | – | – | – | – | – | | | |

== See also ==
- 2012 in amusement parks
- Wild Eagle, a Bolliger & Mabillard Wing Coaster at Dollywood, was the first of its kind in the United States
- GateKeeper, a Bolliger & Mabillard Wing Coaster at Cedar Point
