= Brake (roller coaster) =

Section of track to slow down roller coaster trains

A brake on a roller coaster is a device used to slow or stop a train. There are various types of braking methods employed on roller coasters, including friction or fin brakes, skid brakes, magnetic brakes, brakemen, and, uncommonly, anti-rollback devices. Some companies use drive tires to brake a train. The most common is the friction brake, which utilizes a series of hydraulic-powered clamps that close and squeeze metal fins attached to the underside of a train. Roller coasters may incorporate multiple brake runs (sections of tracks with brakes) throughout their layouts to adjust a train's speed or bring it to a halt at any given time.

The different types of brake runs are classified into two main categories: trim brakes and block brakes. A trim brake refers to a braking section that can only slow a train, while a block brake has the ability to stop a train completely in addition to slowing it down. Block brakes are important to roller coasters that operate more than one train simultaneously, as in the event that one train stalls on a portion of the track, any trains traversing portions of the track behind this section can be stopped in a block brake. While all modern roller coasters have at least one computer-controlled brake run, older coasters such as The Great Scenic Railway at Luna Park Melbourne may have brakes on board the train and rely on a brakeman to apply them as needed.

== Brake classifications ==
=== Trim brakes ===
Trim brakes are brake run sections that reduce the speed of the train but cannot stop the train completely. They may be engineered into a ride during design in anticipation of troubling spots in a layout, or later retrofitted in areas where trains are traveling at speeds higher than intended. Trim brakes can also be added for safety reasons, lowering the g-force riders experience at various points throughout the track layout, or for preventative maintenance reasons, reducing wear-and-tear on the trains and track. A proximity sensor often precedes the trim brake in order to identify the current speed of the passing train and determining how much the brake will need to slow the train, if at all.

=== Block brakes ===
Block brakes are brake run sections that have the ability to slow a train but can additionally stop the train completely. This is required on roller coasters that operate more than one train simultaneously on the track. They act as barriers between the trains running on the roller coaster, preventing collisions if one train stops along the course for any reason. Block brake sections must also be engineered so that the train can begin moving again upon release, either by using a slight downward slope to let gravity take its course or by using drive tires to push the train out of the block. When used in the middle of a ride's layout, these are commonly called mid-course brake runs.

== Brake methods and types ==
Roller coasters utilize a variety of braking methods that have evolved over time.

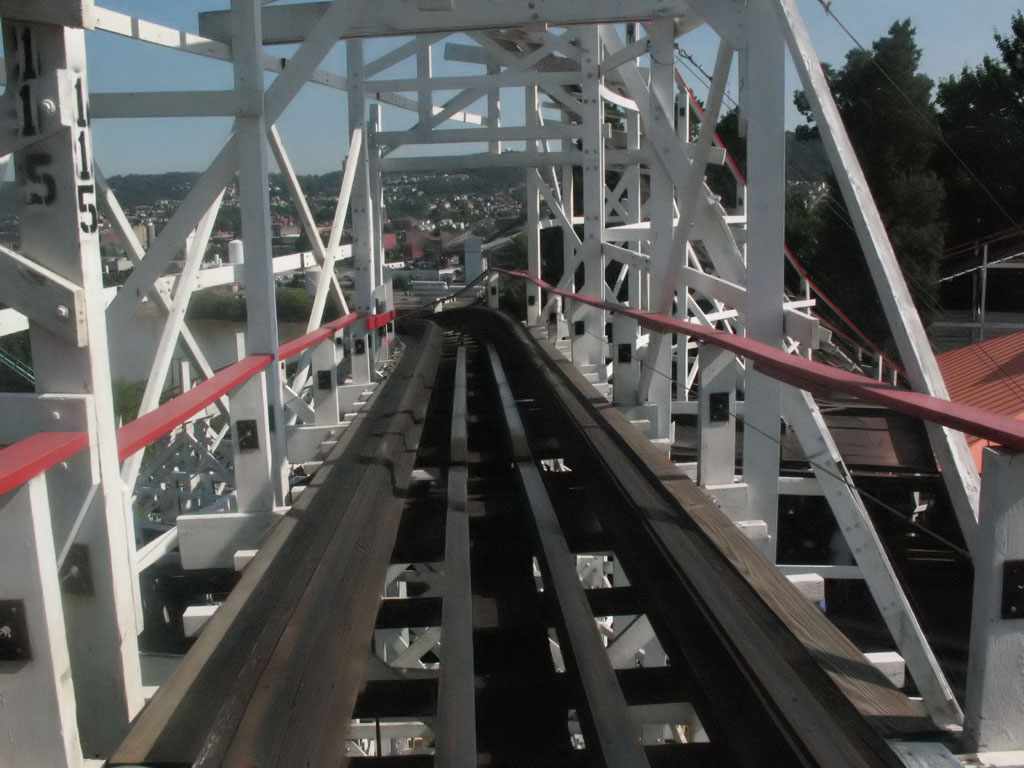
Skid brakes are common on older wooden roller coasters, such as Thunderbolt at Kennywood

=== Skid brakes ===
Skid brakes involve a long piece of material, often covered in ceramic, that is situated in the middle of the track parallel to the rails. When the brake is engaged, the skid raises and causes friction against the underside of the train, reducing its speed. They can be used to slow or stop the train. Skid brakes were one of the first advancements in roller coaster braking and are typically found on older wooden coasters, including Leap-The-Dips, the world's oldest roller coaster.

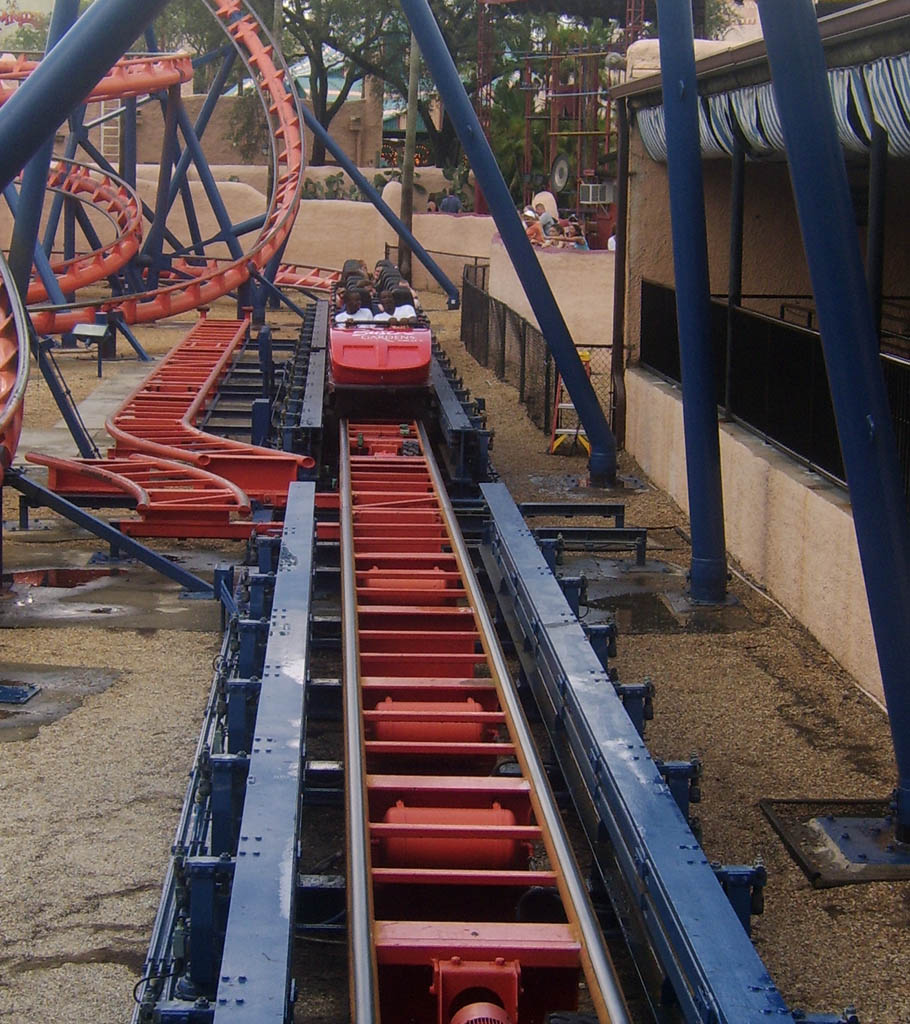
Side-mounted brakes are common on Schwarzkopf roller coasters, such as Scorpion at Busch Gardens Tampa Bay

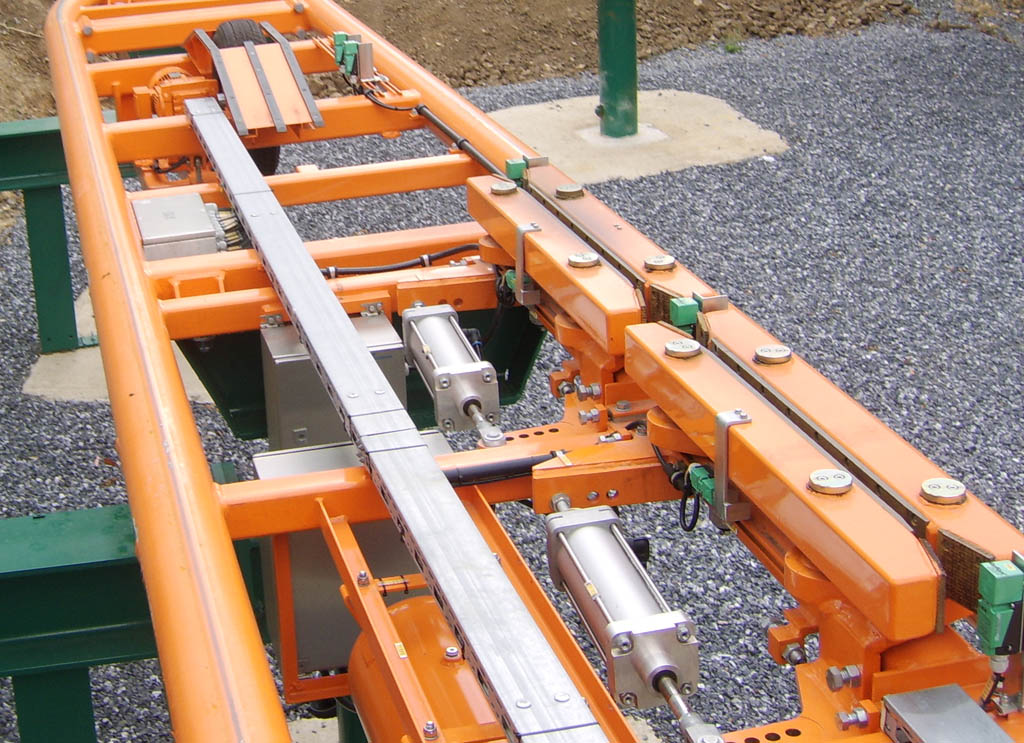
Friction brakes on Speed: No Limits at Oakwood Theme Park

=== Friction brakes ===
Friction brakes, also called fin brakes, involve a computer-controlled clamping system that squeeze metal fins attached to the underside of the train. Friction brakes can be used to slow or stop the train, and are the most common form of brakes found on modern roller coasters. They can involve thick metal box beams or thin metal plates. They slide between pairs of friction pads similar to automotive brake pads.

Friction brakes are designed to be fail-safe, allowing them to engage even when there is a loss of power. They are also constructed with a certain measure of redundancy, incorporating extra sets of brakes in the event that one set fails. Opening is done by a bellows type of air-operated actuator, with each set of brakes fitted with its own air supply system which is controlled by supply valves that open and release the brake when it is safe to do so. A heavy spring, usually made of steel, is used to hold the brake closed when engaged.

=== Magnetic brakes ===
Magnetic brakes apply resistance through magnetism, allowing for no contact between the brakes themselves and the train. They are made up of one or two rows of neodymium magnets. When a metal fin made of copper or a copper-aluminum alloy passes between the rows of magnets, eddy currents are generated in the fin, creating a magnetic force that opposes the fin's motion. The resultant braking force is directly proportional to the speed at which the fin is moving through the brake element.

Magnetic brakes can be found in two configurations:

- The brake elements are mounted to the track or alongside the track and the fins are mounted to the underside or sides of the train. This configuration looks similar to friction brakes.
- The fins are mounted to the track and the brake elements are mounted to the underside of the train. This configuration can be found on Intamin Accelerator Coasters.

Magnetic brakes make no contact with the rail, meaning they do not wear from friction, unlike friction brakes. They are also silent and provide a smoother stop than friction brakes. Bolliger & Mabillard began to introduce such brakes on their roller coasters from 2004 onwards with the installation of Silver Bullet, the first inverted roller coaster to feature magnetic brakes. There also exist third-party companies to retrofit existing coasters with magnetic braking technology.

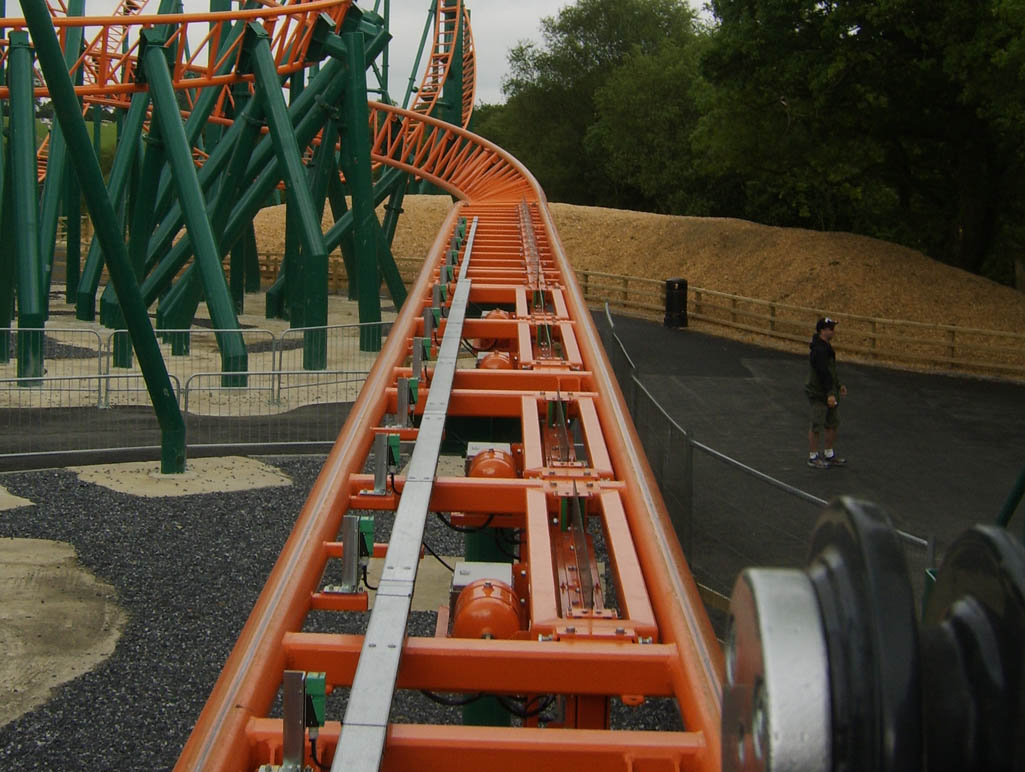
Magnetic brakes on Speed: No Limits, located before the friction brakes. These track-mounted fins can be retracted to allow the train to pass without slowing it down.

A disadvantage of magnetic braking is that the eddy force is not usually stable enough to hold a train completely still, and as such magnetic brakes cannot be used as block brakes. Magnetic brakes are often complemented by an additional set of friction brakes or "kicker wheels", rubber tires that make contact with the train and effectively park it in place. Another disadvantage is that they cannot be conventionally disengaged like other types of brakes. Instead, the fins or magnets must be retracted so that the fins no longer pass between the magnets. Accelerator Coasters, for example, have a series of magnetic brake fins located on the launch track. Prior to the train's launch, the brakes are retracted downward, out of the way, to allow the train to launch forward uninterrupted. After launch, the brake fins are raised back into position to stop the train in the event of a rollback. Examples of this can be found on Storm Runner at Hersheypark and Rita at Alton Towers, both of which are Intamin Accelerator Coasters.

=== Brakemen ===
While skid brakes already existed by the time the scenic railway had been conceived, LaMarcus Adna Thompson decided against using these brakes for his roller coasters, and instead opted for a brakeman system in a similar to manner to those used on gravity railroads. The brakeman would sit in the center of the train and pull a lever to apply a brake and slow down the train.

== See also ==
- List of roller coaster elements
