= DreamWorks Animation in amusement parks =

DreamWorks themed rides and attractions

Since 23 May 2003, DreamWorks Animation, an American animation studio, owned by NBCUniversal since 2016, has had an involvement in the creation and theming of amusement park rides and attractions. This article details the ventures of DreamWorks Animation in amusement parks.

== History ==
In 2003, Universal Destinations & Experiences opened the 4D film called Shrek 4-D at Universal Studios Florida, Universal Studios Hollywood and Universal Studios Japan. The film is chronologically sequenced between the original 2001 film Shrek and Shrek 2 which was released in 2004. In 2005 and 2008, Shrek 4-D was added to Warner Bros. Movie World and Movie Park Germany respectively (the film was later removed from Warner Bros. Movie World and Movie Park Germany in favour of Journey to the Center of the Earth 4-D Adventure and Ice Age: The 4D Experience).

On 18 March 2010, DreamWorks Animation moved further into the theme park industry with the opening of two themed lands at Universal Studios Singapore. The first land is Madagascar which is based upon the 2005 film of the same name. The second land is Far Far Away which is based on the Shrek franchise. Each of the lands featured a variety of attractions themed after the movies. In 2011, Dreamworld announced a $10 million deal with DreamWorks Animation to bring the company's characters to their amusement park. In a 3-stage development beginning on 19 December 2011, Dreamworld will open new shows and newly themed rides and attractions.

In May 2012, the Brazilian theme park Beto Carrero World announced a partnership with DreamWorks Animation, later that year Shrek and other characters began to make meet and greets around the park. The first area with DreamWorks Animation characters opened in February 2014, themed to Madagascar, the area features two attractions, a live show and a river rapids ride. In March 2016, Beto Carrero World and DreamWorks Animation renewed the partnership for more 10 years, and announced three new themed areas featuring Shrek, How to Train Your Dragon, and Kung Fu Panda. The construction was scheduled to start in 2017.

In July 2012, DreamWorks CEO Jeffrey Katzenberg announced that the attractions at the American Dream Mall (formerly Meadowland Mills and Meadowland Xanadu) in the Meadowlands Sports Complex at East Rutherford, New Jersey will be themed to DreamWorks' animated productions. In September 2016, the mall's owner Triple Five Group announced that Nickelodeon Universe will also occupy the indoor amusement park space and DreamWorks Animation would work with partnership in creating the park. In November 2018, the mall's vice president of Communications announced the opening date of September 2019 but by that date it was delayed to November 27, 2019, before being delayed again. By October 25, 2019, the Nickelodeon Universe theme park opened at the American Dream. In February 2020, the park announced its opening date of March 19, 2020. However, the onset COVID-19 pandemic caused American Dream to delay the opening again. In September 2020, the park announced that it will finally open on October 1, 2020, along with the rest of the mall. On October 1, 2020, DreamWorks Water Park officially opened to the public.

In February 2013, it was revealed that DreamWorks Animation has partnered with Regions GC to build in Russia Europe's largest indoor theme parks. Set in Moscow, Saint Petersburg and Yekaterinburg, each park would incorporate a movie and concert hall, 4D movie theater, three-star 400-room hotel and retails. The parks, which were expected to be completed in 2015, would feature themes based on Shrek, Madagascar, How to Train Your Dragon, Kung Fu Panda, and Turbo.

In May 2013, DreamWorks signed a licensing agreement with Sands China to bring its cast of animated characters to Sands Cotai Central in Macau. The resorts would present a series of performances, parades, dining experiences, meet-and-greets and photo opportunities highlighting characters such as Po from Kung Fu Panda; Shrek, Fiona and Puss in Boots from Shrek; Alex the Lion, King Julien and the Penguins from Madagascar and Toothless and Hiccup from How to Train Your Dragon.

In January 2024, Universal Destinations and Experiences announced How to Train Your Dragon — Isle of Berk as one of the five featured worlds at Universal Epic Universe. The world opened alongside the rest of the park on May 22, 2025.

== Locations ==
Park	Area	Opening date	Closing date	Previous attraction	Replaced by
American Dream Meadowlands	DreamWorks Water Park	19 March 2020	—N/a	—N/a	—N/a
Beto Carrero World	Madagascar	10 October 2013	—N/a	—N/a	—N/a
Dreamworld	DreamWorks Experience	1 April 2012	2023	Kid's World; Nickelodeon Central	Kenny and Belinda's Dreamland
Gardaland	Kung Fu Panda Academy	14 May 2016	2025	Dragon Empire	—N/a
Heide Park Resort	Drachenzähmen - Die Insel	14 May 2016	—N/a	—N/a	—N/a
Motiongate Dubai	DreamWorks; Shrek; Madagascar; Kung Fu Panda; How to Train Your Dragon	16 December 2016	—N/a	—N/a	—N/a
Movie Park Germany	Standalone attraction	27 May 2008	2011	SpongeBob SquarePants 4-D	Ice Age Dawn of the Dinosaurs: The 4-D Experience
Universal Epic Universe	How to Train Your Dragon — Isle of Berk	22 May 2025	—N/a	—N/a	—N/a
Universal Kids Resort	Isle of Curiosity; TrollsFest; Shrek's Swamp; Puss in Boots Del Mar	1 July 2026	—N/a	—N/a	—N/a
Universal Studios Florida	Standalone attractions	12 June 2003; 28 May 2021	10 January 2022; 15 January 2023	Alfred Hitchcock: The Art of Making Movies; Stage 54; A Day in the Park with Barney	Illumination's Villain-Con Minion Blast
Universal Studios Florida	DreamWorks Land	14 June 2024	—N/a	Woody Woodpecker's KidZone	—N/a
Universal Studios Hollywood	Standalone attractions	23 May 2003; 15 June 2018	14 August 2017	Rugrats Magic Adventure 3-D	DreamWorks Theatre
Universal Studios Japan	Standalone attraction	20 June 2003	—N/a	—N/a	—N/a
Universal Studios Singapore	Far Far Away; Madagascar	18 March 2010	27 March 2022 (Madagascar)	—N/a	Despicable Me Minion Mayhem (Madagascar); Minion Land (Madagascar); Super Nintendo World (Madagascar)
Warner Bros. Movie World	Standalone attractions	17 September 2005	29 August 2010	Marvin the Martian in 3D	Journey to the Center of the Earth 4-D Adventure

== Attractions ==
Below is a list of all of the attractions at DreamWorks Animation themed areas around the world. The dates shown in the columns refer to the opening and closing dates for the ride under that name. It does not mean that the ride was closed and/or removed.

Attraction	Type	ADM	DW	MGD	MPG	UEU	USF	USH	USJ	USS	WBMW	BCW
Bubbly Lazy River	Lazy river	2020-										
Camp Viking	Play area			2017-								
The Carnivortex	Drop Launch capsule slide	2020-										
Donkey Live	Interactive live show									2010–		
Donkey's Photo Finish	Meet and greet						2003–2022, 2022–2023					
Dragon Gliders	Mack Rides Inverted power coaster			2017-								
Dragon And Donkey's Flight	Family raft ride	2020-										
Dragon Racer's Rally	Gerstlauer Sky Fly					2025–						
DreamWorks Holiday Shrektacular Show	Live show		2011–2012									
DreamWorks Destination	Interactive live show / Meet and greet						2021–2023					
DreamWorks Imagination Celebration	Live show						2024–					
DreamWorks Theatre	4-D film/Motion simulator							2018–				
Dronkey Flyers	Children's rotating flat ride		2012–2023									
Enchanted Airways	Junior roller coaster									2010–		
Escape from Madagascar	Suspended Family Coaster		2012–2023									
Far Far A Bay Wave Pool	Wave pool	2020-										
Fountain of Dreams	Interactive fountain			2017-								
Fyre Drill	Mack Rides interactive boat ride					2025–						
Gingy's Glider	Kite Flyer		2012–2023									
Hiccup's Wing Gliders	Intamin launch coaster					2025–						
Jungle Jammer	Drop Launch capsule slide	2020-										
King Julien's Beach Party-Go-Round	Carousel									2010–2022		
King Julien's Side Show Stomp	Live show			2017-								
King Julien's Theatre in the Wild	Show stage		2012–2023									
Kung Fu Academy	Play area		2012–2023									
Kung Fu Panda Academy	Interactive live show			2017-								
Kung Fu Panda Temple of Awesomeness Play Structure	Water play area	2020-										
Kung Fu Panda: Unstoppable Awesomeness	4-D film/Motion simulator			2017-								
Lemur Leap	Tube bowl slide	2020-										
MAD Jungle Jam	Ball play area		2012–2023									
Mad Flush	Body bowl slide	2020-										
Madagascar: A Crate Adventure	Water ride									2011–2022		
Madagascar Mad Pursuit	Gerstlauer Infinity coaster			2017-								
Magic Potion Spin	Children's Ferris wheel									2010–		
Majunga Jump	Body slide	2020-										
Mama Luna Feline Fiesta	Play area											
Meet Shrek and Donkey	Meet and greet							2003–2017, 2018–				
Melman-Go-Round	Carousel			2017-								
Mr. Ping's Noodle Fling	Teacups			2017-								
Operation Penguin Shake	Live show			2017-								
Pandamonium	Zamperla Air Race		2012–2023									
Penguin Air	Zamprela Magic Bike			2017-								
Penguin Plummet	Body slide	2020-										
The Penguins Frozen Fun Zone	Water play area	2020-										
Po Live!	Interactive live show						2024–					
Po's Kung Fu Training Camp	Play area						2024–					
Poppy's Playground	Play area						2024–					
Puss in Boots Sword Swing	Swing ride		2012–2023									
Puss in Boots' Giant Journey	Inverted roller coaster									2015–		
Shrek 4-D	4D film				2008–2011		2003–2022	2003–2017	2003–	2010–	2005–2010	
Shrek's Merry Fairy Tale Journey	Dark ride			2017-								
Shrek's Sinkhole Slammer	ProSlide Tornado	2020-										
Shrek's Swamp for Little Ogres	Play area						2024–					
Shrek's Swamp Meet	Meet and greet						2024–					
Shrek Live	Live show										????–????	
Shrek's Ogre-Go-Round	Carousel		2012–2023									
Skadoosh	Bumper cars		2012–2023									
Speeding Frenzy	Tube slide	2020-										
Surfari Slider	Drop Launch capsule slide	2020-										
Swamp Celebration	Disk'O			2017-								
Swamp N' Splash	Triple funnel slide											
The Swinging Viking	Pirate ship			2017-								
Thrillagascar	Drop Launch capsule slide	2020-										
Trolls Rainbow Racer	Mat Racer	2020-										
Trolls Trollercoaster	Junior roller coaster						2024–					
Tube It!	Tube slide	2020-										
The Untrainable Dragon	Live Show					2025–						
Viking Training Camp	Kids play area					2025–						
Zany Zigzag	Body slide	2020-										
Zanier Zigzag	Body slide	2020-										
Madagascar Crazy River Adventure!	River rapids ride											2014–
Madagascar Circus Show!	Live Show											2014–

== Gallery ==
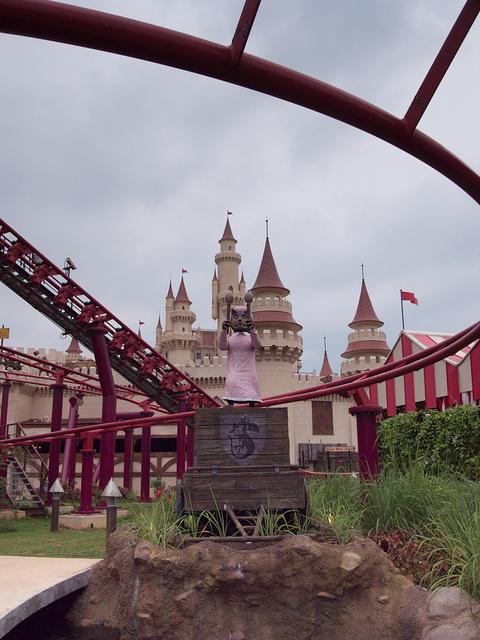
Enchanted Airways at Universal Studios Singapore

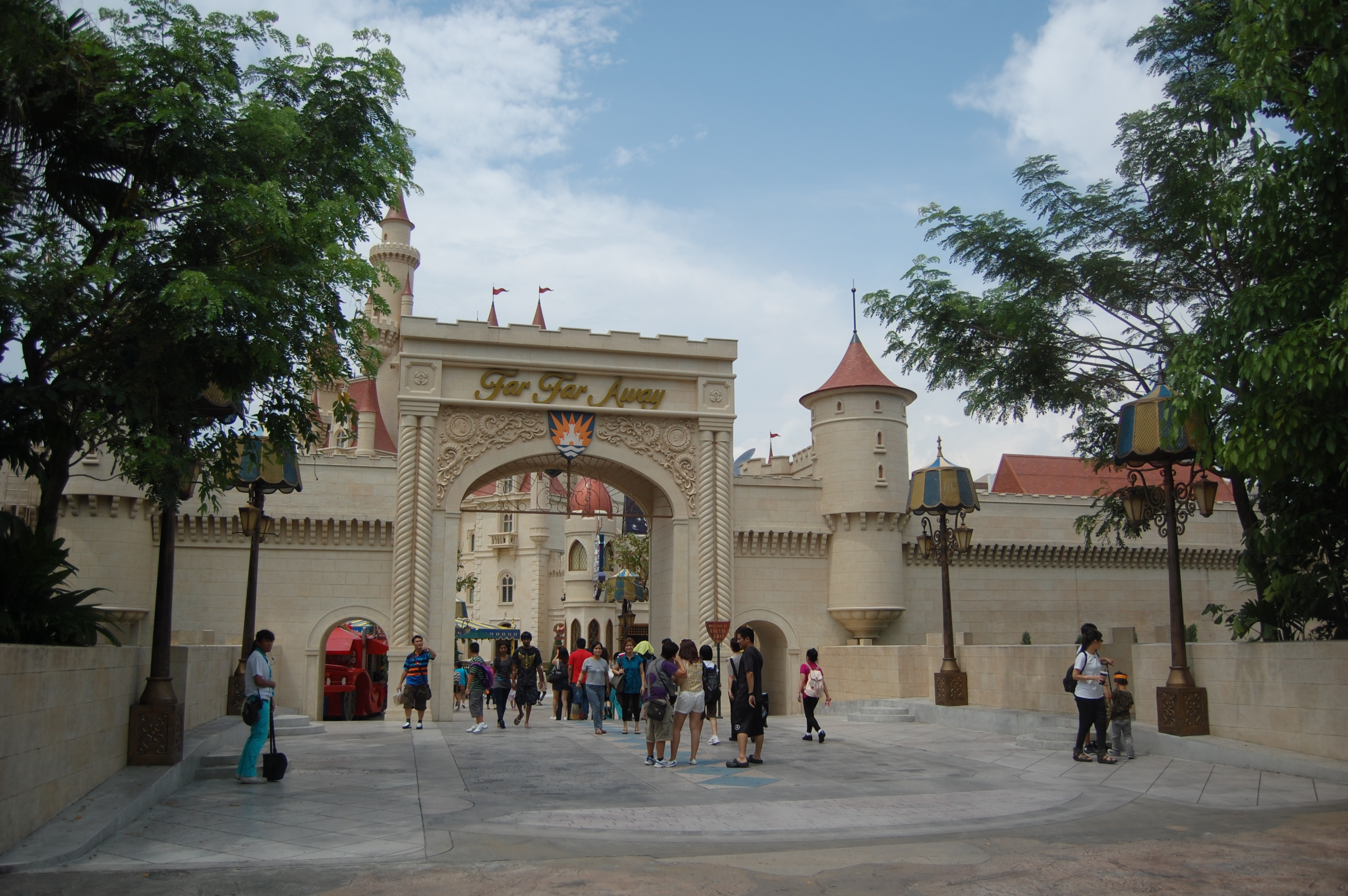
Far Far Away at Universal Studios Singapore

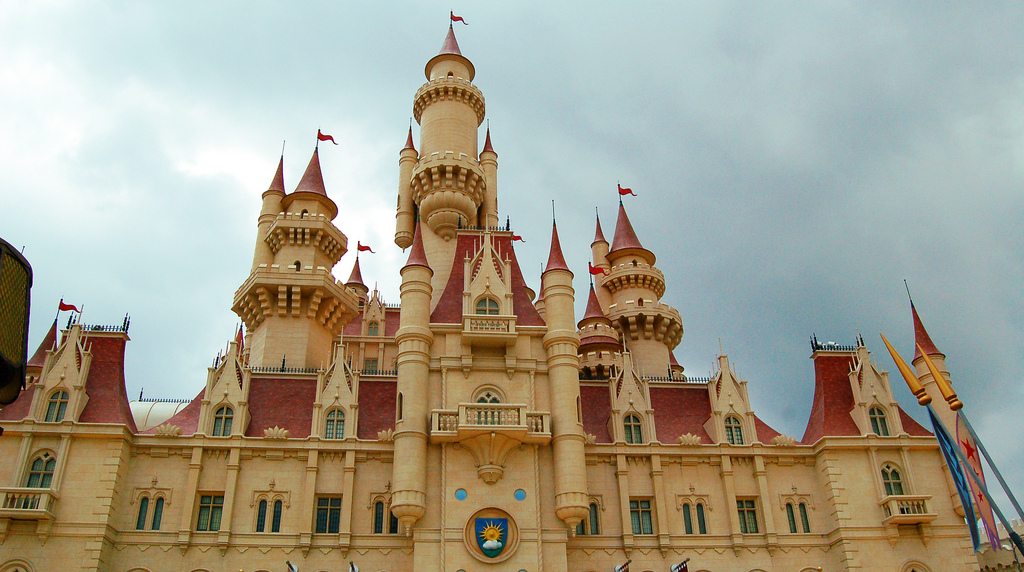
Far Far Away Castle at Universal Studios Singapore

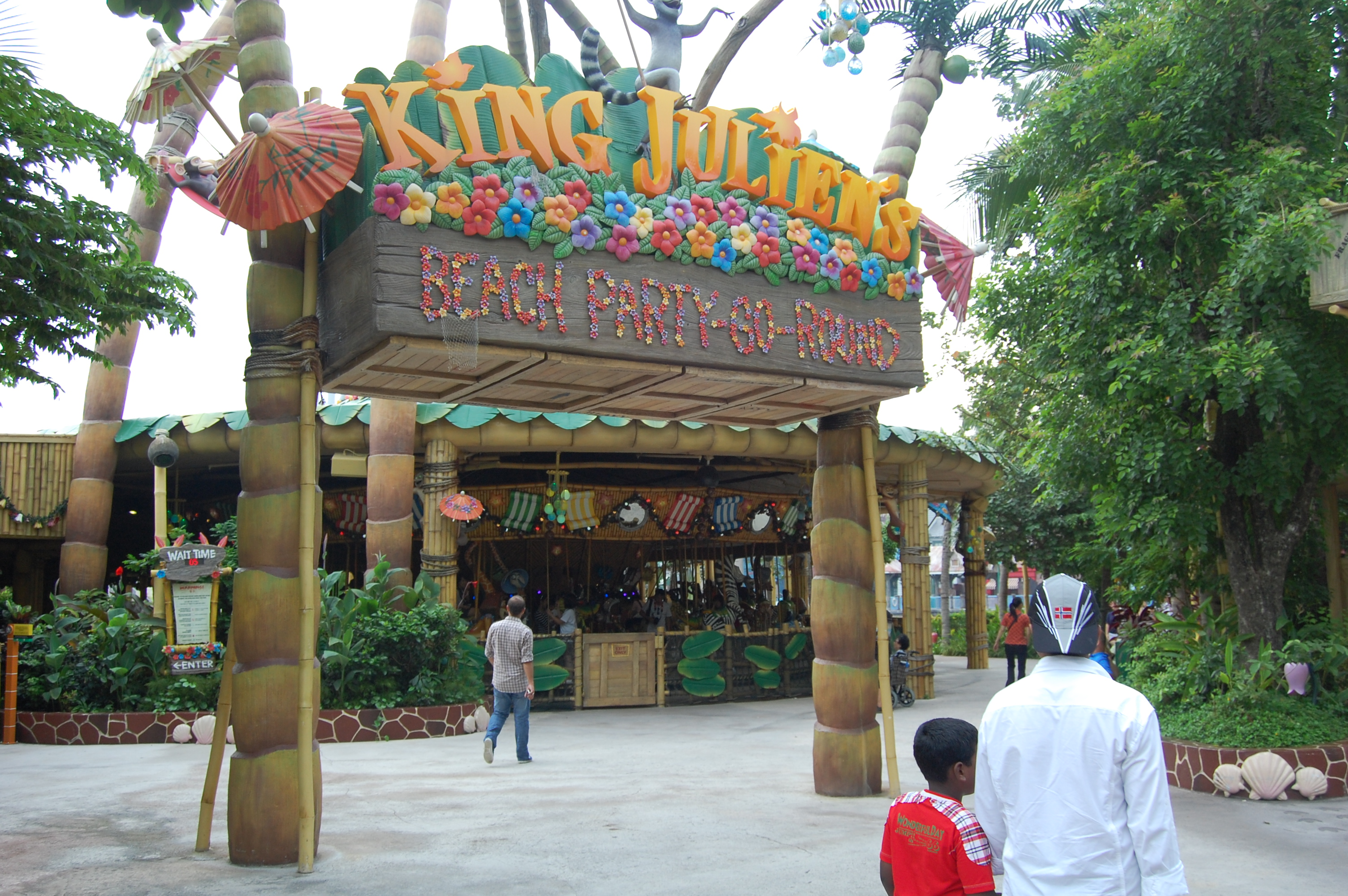
King Julien's Beach Party-Go-Round at Universal Studios Singapore

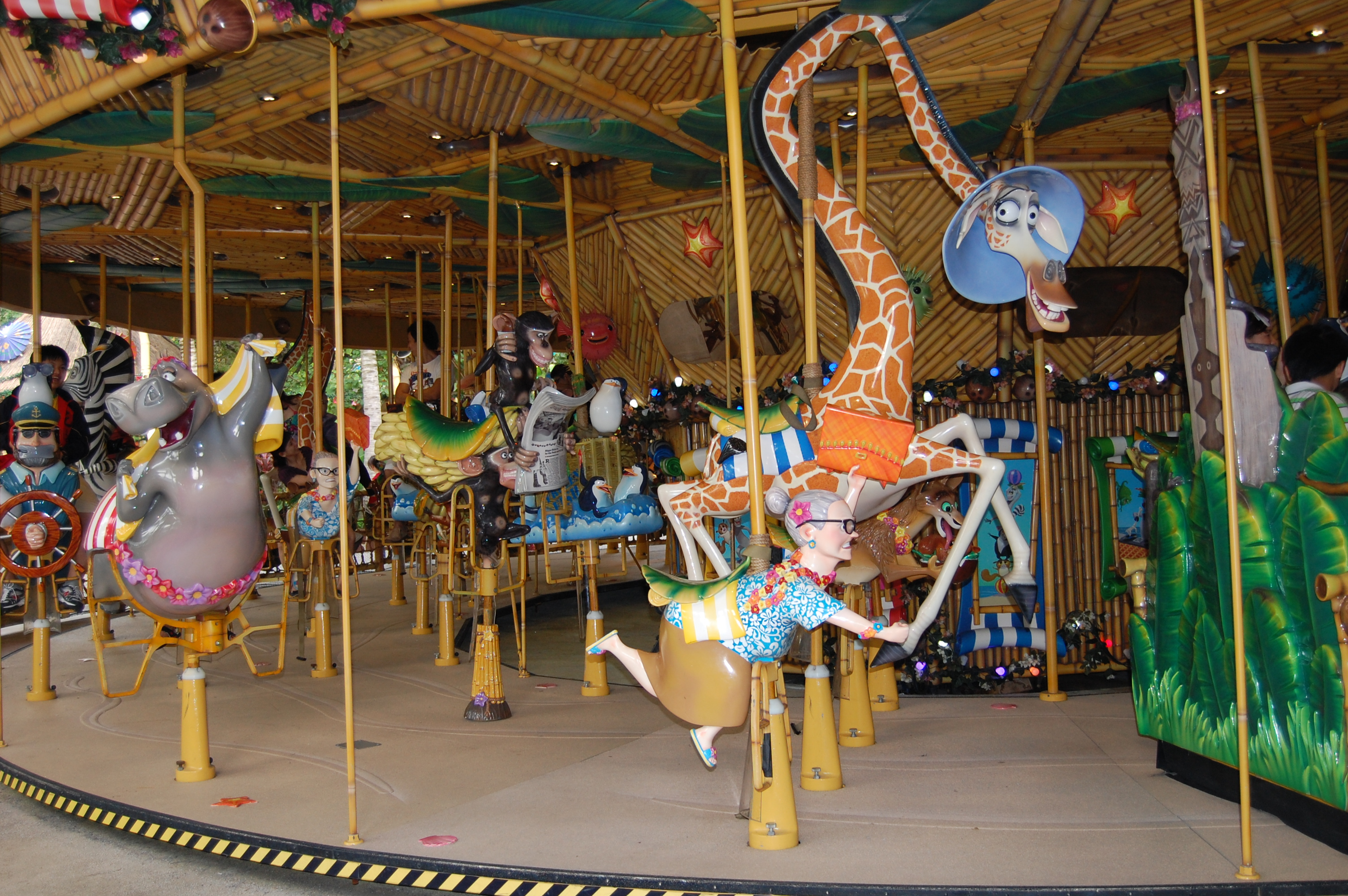
King Julien's Beach Party-Go-Round at Universal Studios Singapore

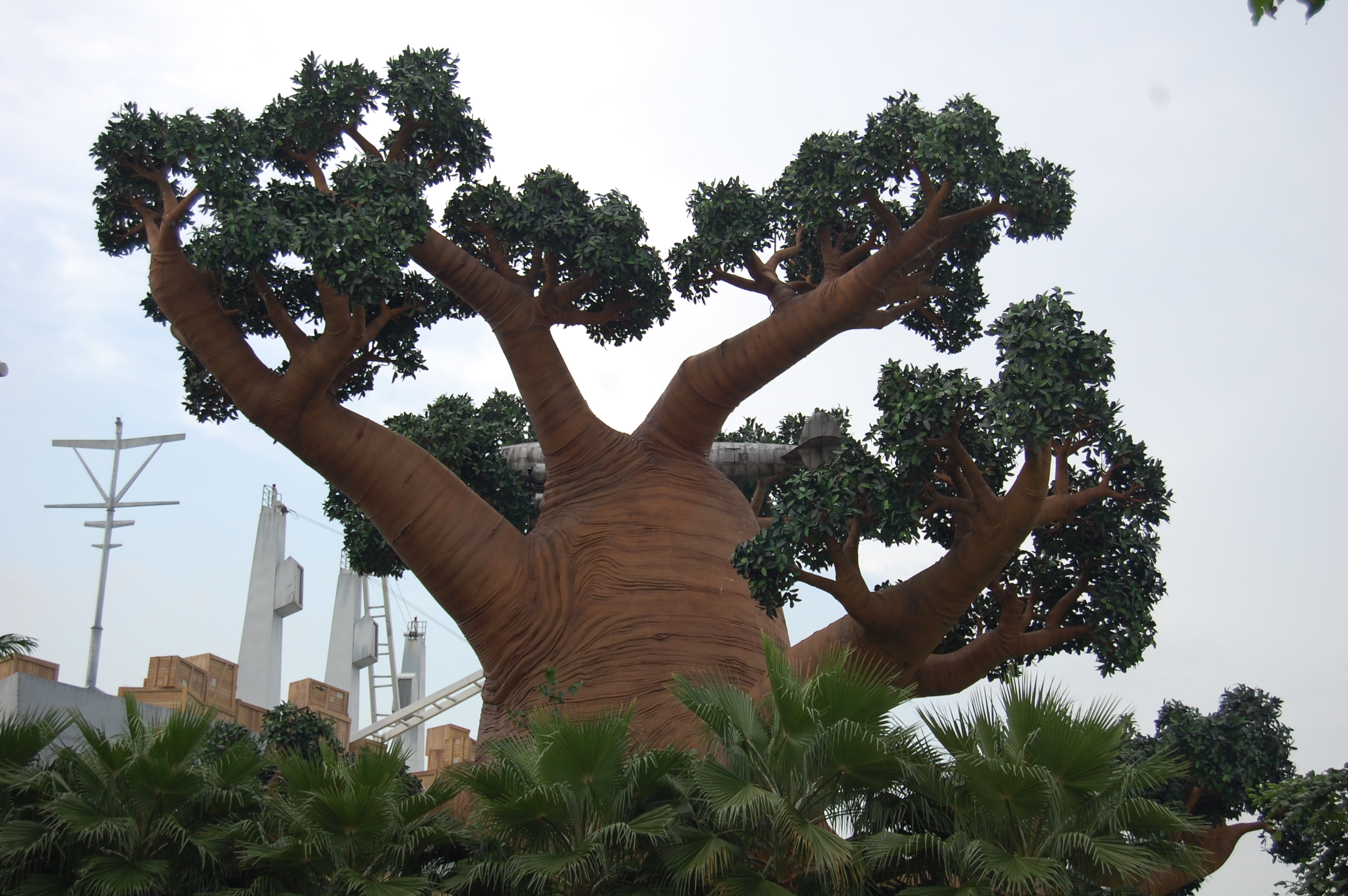
Madagascar at Universal Studios Singapore

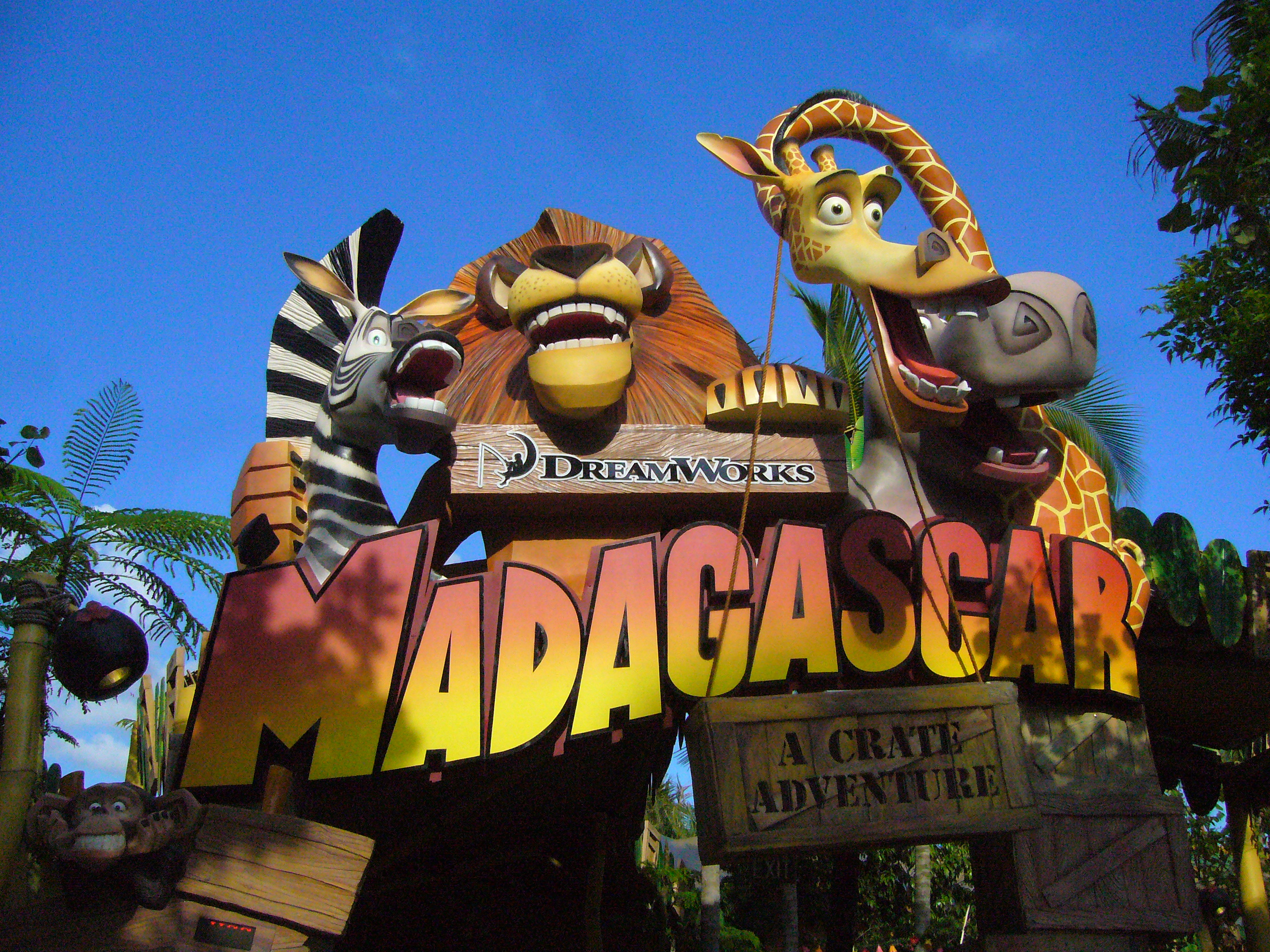
Madagascar: A Crate Adventure at Universal Studios Singapore

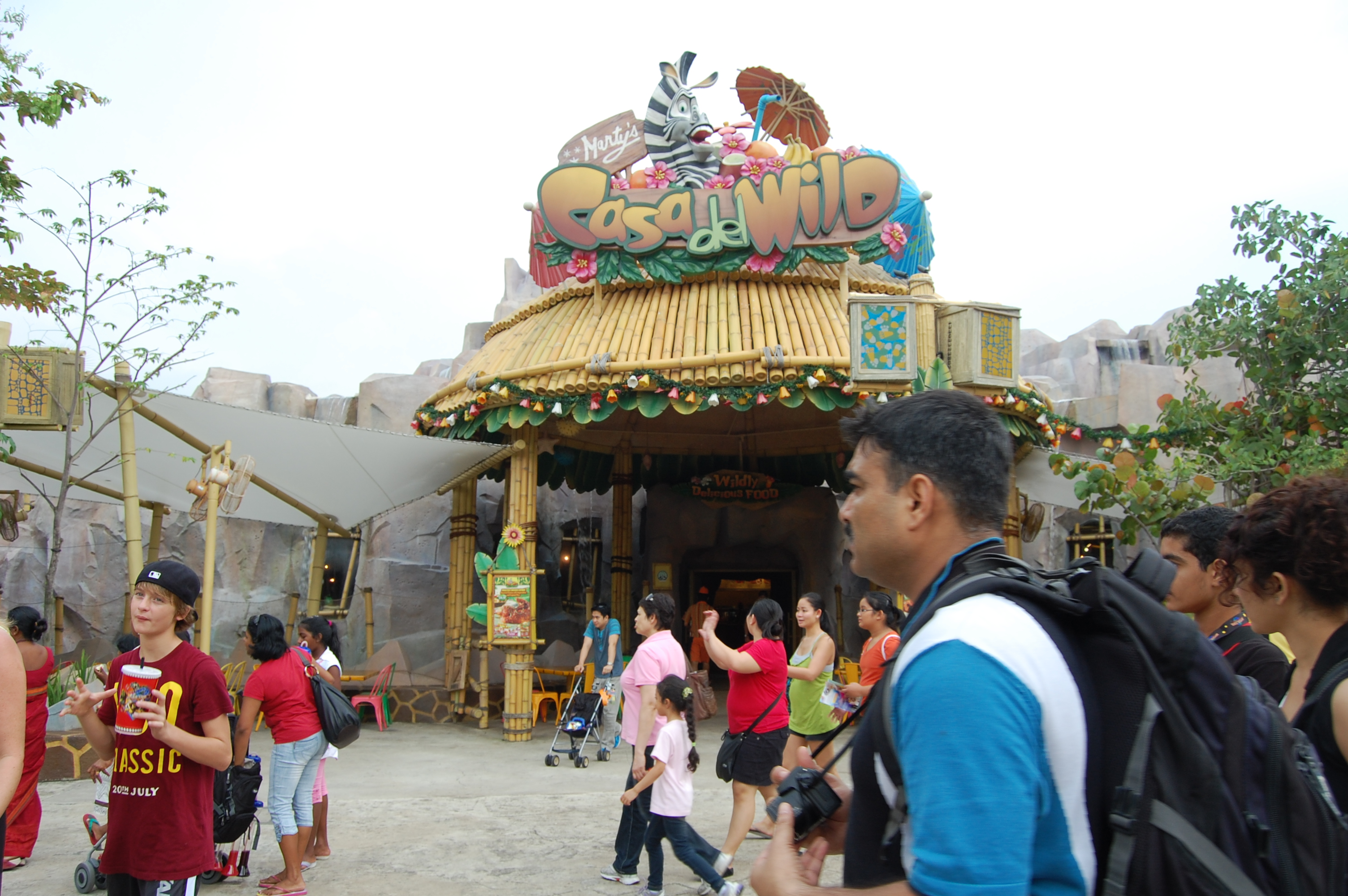
Marty's Casa Del Wild at Universal Studios Singapore

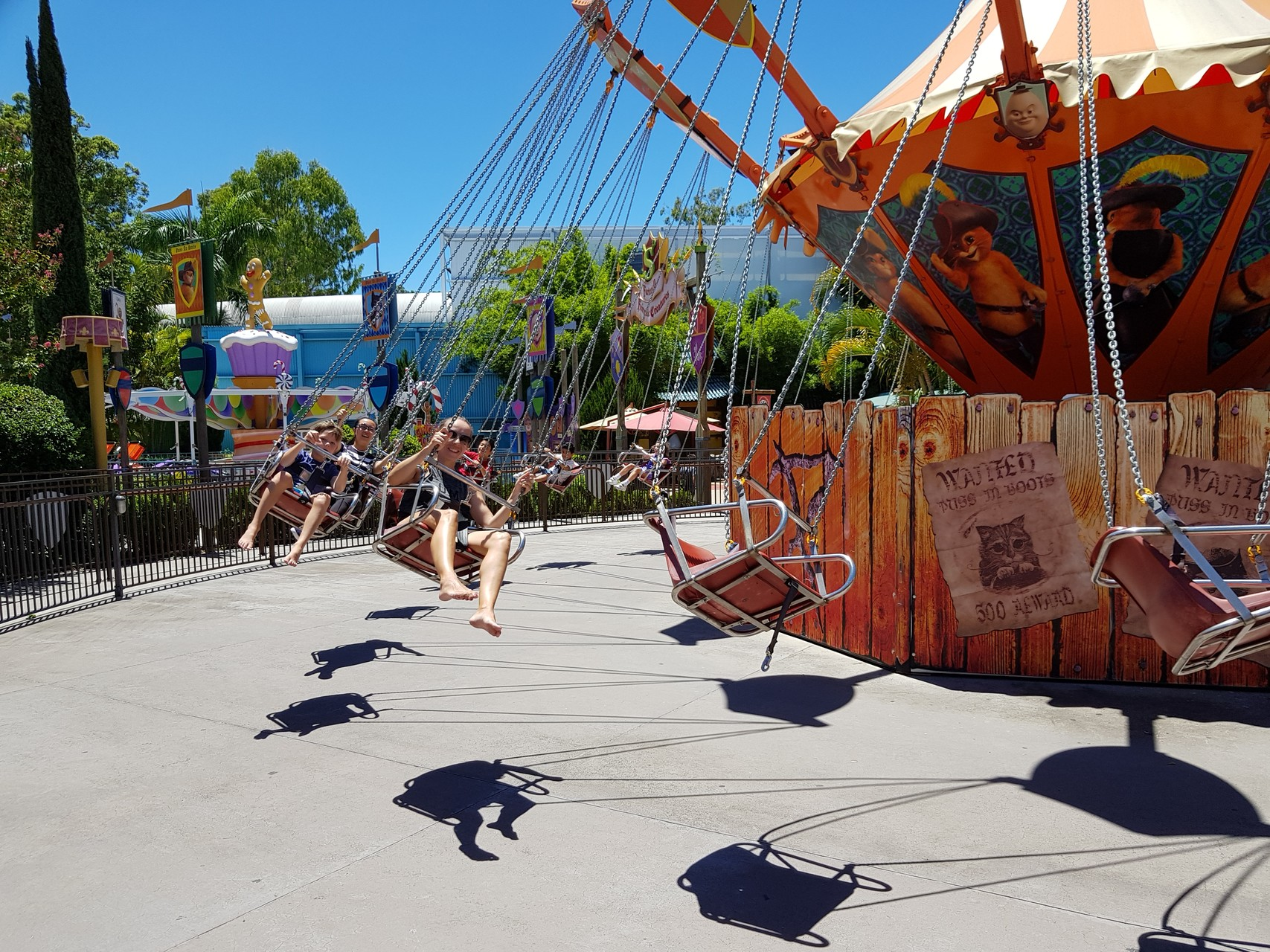
Puss in Boots Sword Swing at Dreamworld

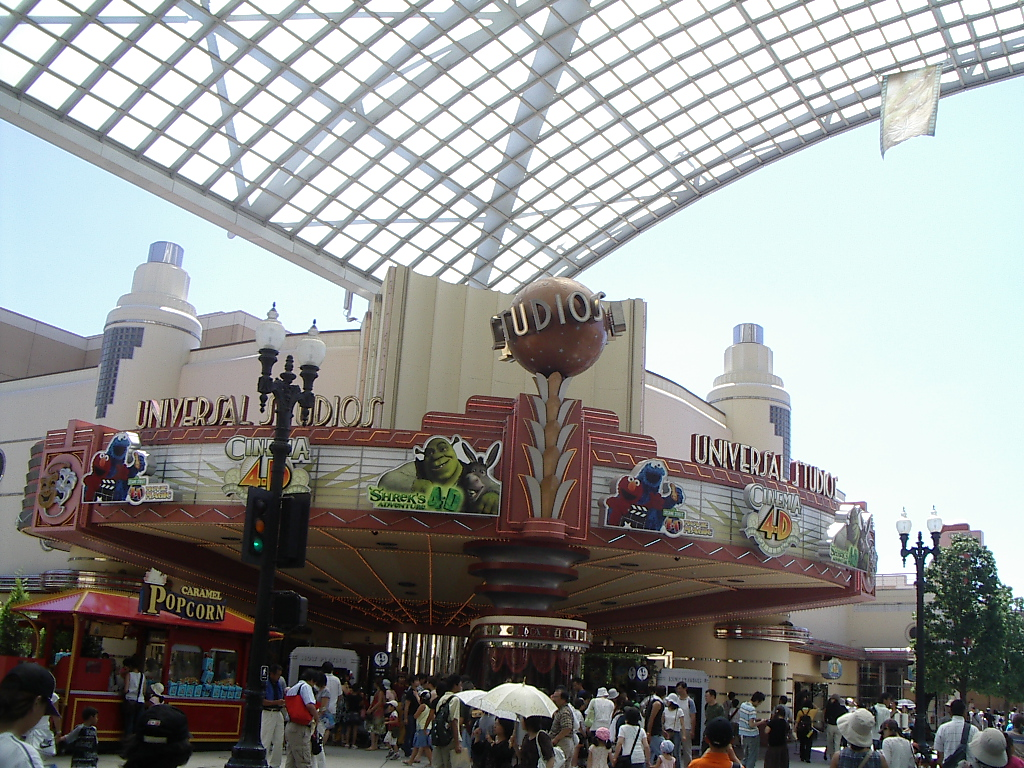
Shrek 4-D at Universal Studios Japan

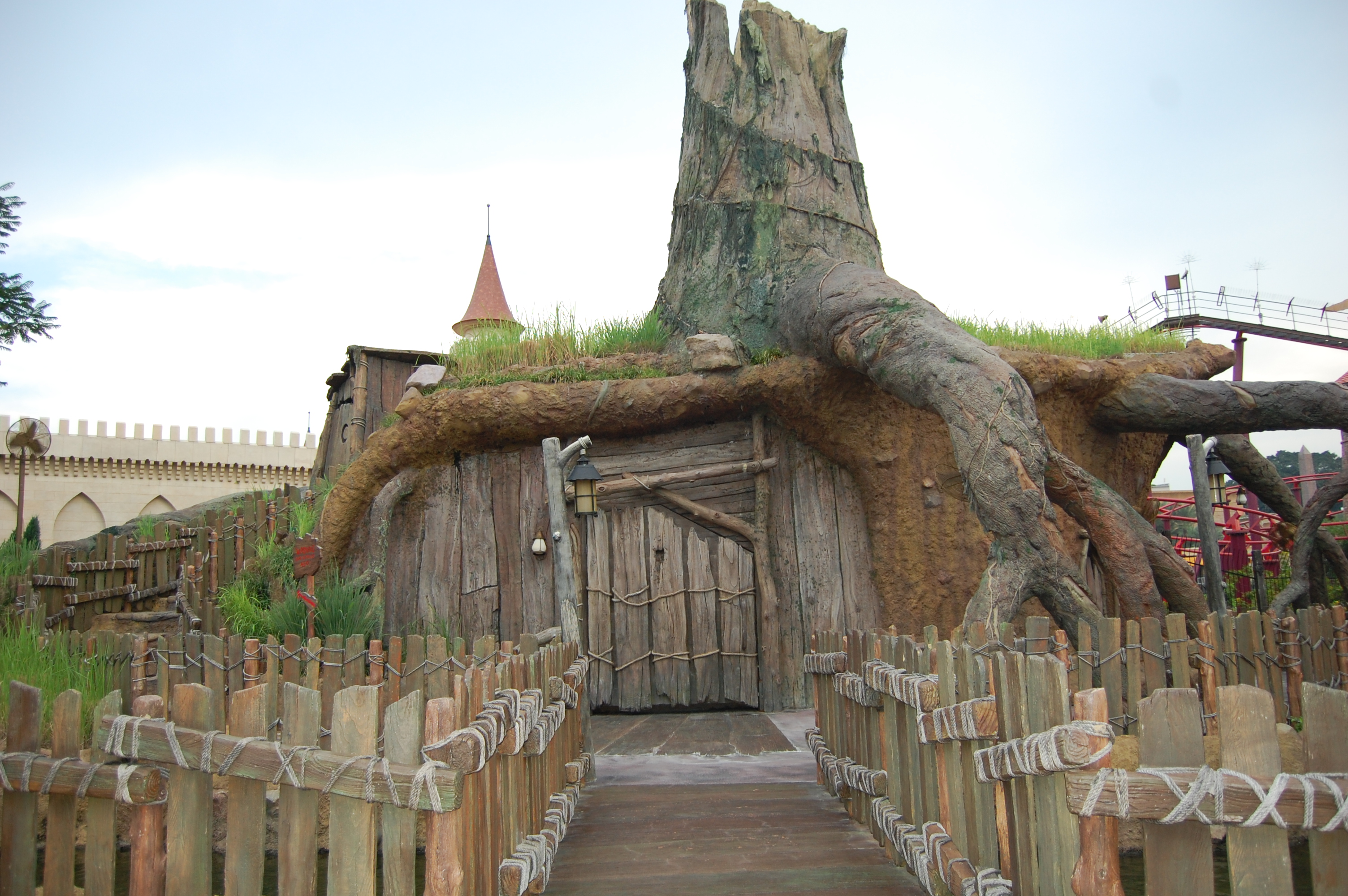
Shrek's Swamp at Universal Studios Singapore
