= DreamWorks Experience =

Themed land at the Dreamworld theme park

- Interactive map of DreamWorks Experience
- Theme: DreamWorks Animation

Attractions
- Total: 15
- Roller coasters: 1
- Other rides: 7
- Shows: 1

Dreamworld
- Coordinates: 27.864100°S 153.316752°E
- Status: Defunct
- Opened: 31 March 2012; 13 years ago (as DreamWorks Experience)
- Closed: 2023
- Replaced: Kid's World (2011–2012); Nickelodeon Central (2002–2011); Kennyland (1999–2002)
- Replaced by: Kenny and Belinda's Dreamland

DreamWorks Experience was a themed land at the Dreamworld theme park on the Gold Coast, Queensland, Australia. It contained attractions themed to DreamWorks Animation films. Prior, the land was formerly themed to Nickelodeon properties.

== History ==
=== Early history ===
The area which DreamWorks Experience occupied was originally known as Village Green when it opened in 1983. In 1998, the area was renamed to Village Oval. In 1999, the northern end of Village Oval was redesigned to become Kennyland.

=== Nickelodeon Central ===
In early 2002, Kennyland was removed and most of Village Oval was fenced off. Some of the children's rides were moved to Rivertown to allow for the construction of Nickelodeon Central. During that year the leftover rides were rethemed and relocated to their current positions as part of Nickelodeon Central. Nickelodeon Central opened on 26 December 2002 as the largest children's area in an Australian theme park. In 2008, SpongeBob FlyPants opened to expand Nickelodeon Central's offerings.

On 27 April 2010, the Dora the Explorer Seaplanes closed for maintenance and has not operated since. The ride was removed in late 2010 from its position in the park in addition to it being removed from the attraction listing and park map.

=== DreamWorks Experience ===
In October 2011, the former Nick Pics building and the Remota Boats area were demolished with work beginning on a replacement building on the Nick Pics site.

Earlier in 2011, the outgoing CEO of Dreamworld, Noel Dempsey, leaked Dreamworld's plans to team up with DreamWorks Animation on his LinkedIn profile page. On 10 November 2011, Dreamworld officially announced a three-stage plan to incorporate DreamWorks Animation films and characters into its theme park. The first phase, set to open 19 December 2011, was the DreamWorks Holiday Shrektacular Show which featured 8 DreamWorks Animation characters live on stage. The second phase will include the retheming of Dreamworld's kids area, Kid's World, into a 8,400-square-metre (90,000 sq ft) DreamWorks Experience precinct. This phase is set to open in Easter 2012. The final phase will be the development of an eating and meet-and-greet area called Kung Fu garden. The three phases are expected to cost $10 million to complete.

In late 2011, construction of the DreamWorks Experience precinct began with the removal of the photo shop and the adjacent Remota Boats in Main Street. On 1 February 2012, following the peak season, Dreamworld closed most of the rides in Kid's World. Swinger Zinger, Mighty-Go-Round, Sky Rocket, Rainforest Rampage and Kite Flyer were all closed pending their retheme into DreamWorks Animation. During this time, two temporary rides named Mini-Swingers (SBF Visa Group Circus Swing) and Choppers (SBF Visa Group Chopper Train) operated in Ocean Parade near The Claw and AVPX, respectively. In February 2012, Dreamworld announced that the DreamWorks Experience precinct would originally consist of two areas (Madagascar Madness and Shrek’s Faire Faire Away) with a third area (Kung Fu Panda: Land of Awesomeness) to be added later. Names for the rethemed rides were also announced. On 31 March 2012, the DreamWorks Experience officially opened to the public.

On 15 July 2012, the Avalanche was closed to make way for a new attraction at the end of the year. The replacement attraction was part of Kung Fu Panda: Land of Awesomeness and its opening marked the final stage of the DreamWorks Experience.

=== Kenny and Belinda's Dreamland ===
In November 2022, Dreamworld announced that as part of their new multi-million dollar expansion, the DreamWorks Experience would be replaced with Kenny and Belinda's Dreamland, bringing back the initial Kenny Koala theme that the area once had. Most of the attractions will make it over, however the attractions in the "Kung Fu Panda - Land of Awesomeness" area will instead be moved to the Ocean Parade section.

== Attraction history ==
The area has seen many different name changes and re-themes over the years to fit in with the licenses and brands.

County Fair	Village Green/Oval		Nickelodeon Central				Kid's World	DreamWorks Experience
1982	1983	2000	2002	2003	2008	2010	2011	2012
Red Baron			Dora the Explorer Sea Planes					
Zumer			Swinger Zinger					Puss in Boots Sword Swing
	Avalanche		Angry Beavers Spooty Spin				Avalanche	
	Bumper Bowl		Rocket Power Bumper Beach				Bumper Beach	Skadoosh
	Carousel		Nick-O-Round		Backyardigans Mighty-Go-Round		Mighty-Go-Round	Shrek's Ogre-Go-Round
		Dream Copters		Blue's Skidoo				Dronkey Flyers
			Rugrats Runaway Reptar				Sky Rocket	Escape from Madagascar
			Slime Bowl				Dreambowl	King Julien's Theatre in the Wild
			Wild Thornberry's Rainforest Rampage				Rainforest Rampage	MAD Jungle Jam
					SpongeBob FlyPants		Kite Flyer	Gingy's Glider
								Pandamonium

=== Attractions at the time of closure ===
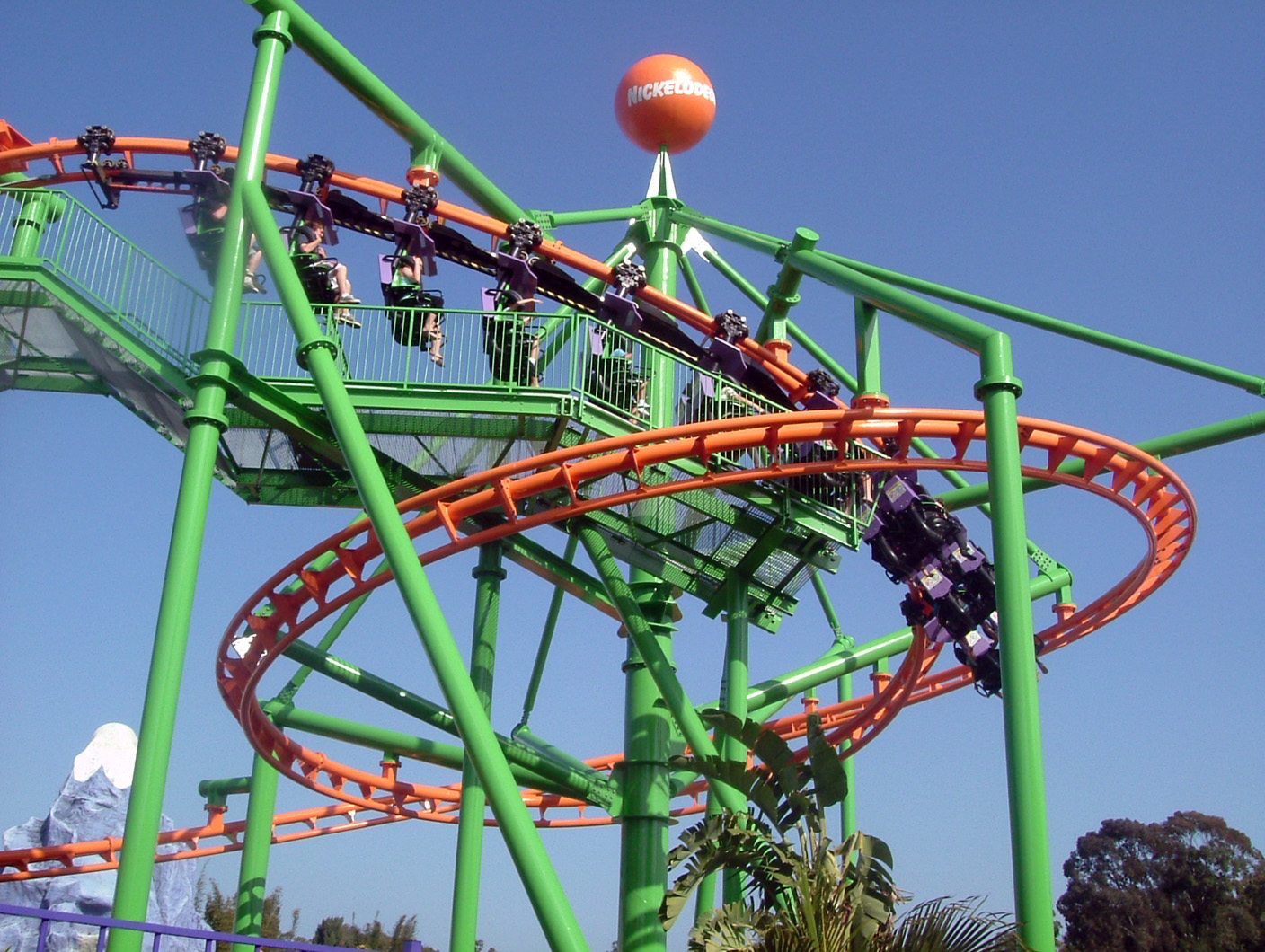
Kenny's Forest Flyer roller coaster (when it was Rugrats Runaway Reptar)

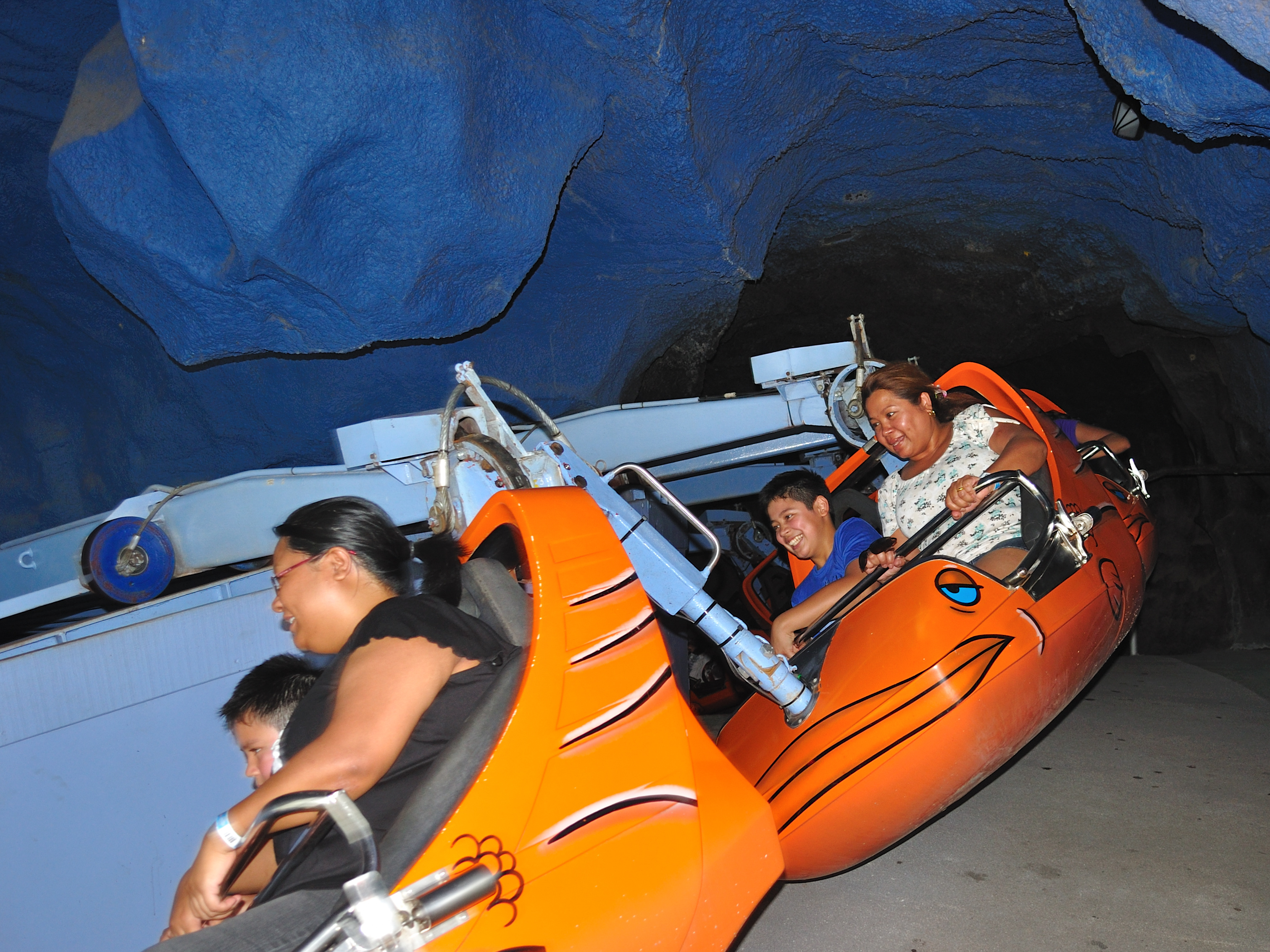
Avalanche (when it was Angry Beavers Spooty Spin)

==== Shrek’s Faire Faire Away ====
Name	Opened	Manufacturer	Description	Previous names
Dronkey's Flyers	2000	SBF Visa Group	A fixed-arm, rotating plane ride (ride cars depended on the ride's then-name) which originally opened with Kennyland. During the ride's "Blue's Skidoo" era, it was the only ride in Kid's World that did not gain a generic re-theme. The ride was refurbished and rebuilt for Kenny and Belinda's Dreamland, and reopened in Mid-2023 as the Wiggles-themed "Big Red Planes Ride".	Dream Copters (2000–2002); Blue's Skidoo (2003–2012)
Gingy's Glider	2008	Zamperla	A Kite Flyer ride. It was the only new attraction added to the then-named Nickelodeon Central area throughout its tenure, being placed near the merchandise show and play area, before being moved during the DreamWorks Experience re-theme adjacent to the Roller Coaster. For Kenny and Belinda's Dreamland, the ride initially the temporary name and theme of "Candy Flyer" until it closed for refurbishment in August 2023 and reopened in September as the Play School-themed "Humpty-Go-Round".	SpongeBob FlyPants (2008–2011); Kite Flyer (2011–2012)
Puss in Boots Sword Swing	1982	Chance Industries	A swinger ride and one of Dreamworld's opening day attractions. For Kenny and Belinda's Dreamland, The ride gained the temporary name of "Soaring Swing" until closing at the end of May 2023, being dismantled to make way for the Wiggles-themed Big Red Boat roller coaster.	Zoomer (1982–2002); Swinger Zinger (2002–2012)
Shrek's Ogre-Go-Round	1983	Ferrari	Standard Carousel ride that has had many themes since 2002. The ride was kept for Kenny and Belinda's Dreamland, and reopened in 2023 as the "Bananas in Pyjamas Carousel".	Carousel (1983–2002); Nick-O-Round (2002–2008); Backyardigans Mighty-Go-Round (2008–2011); Mighty-Go-Round (2011–2012)

==== Madagascar Madness ====
Name	Opened	Manufacturer	Description	Previous names
Escape from Madagascar	2002	Vekoma	A suspended family roller coaster which opened with Nickelodeon Central in 2002, being the third of its type in the world, and the first one located in the Southern Hemisphere. During the Kenny and Belinda's Dreamland transition period, the attraction was temporarily named "Escape Coaster" before closing for refurbishment in April 2023 and reopening as "Kenny's Forest Flyer" in August, now being themed to Kenny Koala, Dreamworld's mascot.	Rugrats Runaway Reptar (2002–2011); Sky Rocket (2011–2012)
MAD Jungle Jam	2002	Dreamworld	A ball play area that allows kids to fire foam balls throughout the enclosure at targets and each other. The ride was kept for Kenny and Belinda's Dreamland, and later reopened as "Belinda's Treehouse" in 2023, themed to Dreamworld's secondary mascot Belinda Brown.	Wild Thornberry's Rainforest Rampage (2002–2011); Rainforest Rampage (2011–2012)
King Julien's Theatre in the Wild	2002	Dreamworld	A show stage that showcases various live shows. During the Nickelodeon Central era, shows included "Slime Time Live", "SpongeBob SquarePants: Stories from Bikini Bottom" or "Blue's Clues Live". During the Kid's World era, the shows were "The Kenny Koala Show" and "The Goldie the Clown Show". During the DreamWorks Experience era, it showed "Madagascar Live – Prepare to Party". The stage was kept for Kenny and Belinda's Dreamland, and renamed to the "Dreamworld Theater", and is now showing a Wiggles-themed show.	Slime Bowl (2002–2011); Dreambowl (2011–2012)

==== Kung Fu Panda: Land of Awesomeness ====
Name	Opened	Manufacturer	Description	Previous names
Kung Fu Academy	2012	Dreamworld	Asmall outdoor kids' gym area consisting of small poles for kids to stretch. It was removed shortly after the closure of the DreamWorks Experience area.	N/A
Pandamonium	2012	Zamperla	An Air race ride themed to Kung Fu Panda. It opened in 2012 and replaced the former Avalanche ride. In 2023, the attraction, alongside the other Kung Fu Panda: Land of Awesomeness attractions was relocated to the expanded Ocean Parade area, and the attraction reopened as "Serpent Slayer" later on in the year.	N/A
Skadoosh	1983	SBF Visa Group	A themed bumper cars attraction. In 2023, the attraction, alongside the other Kung Fu Panda: Land of Awesomeness attractions was relocated to the expanded Ocean Parade area, initially under the temporary name of the Dreamworld Dodgems until it closed for refurbishment in Mid-July 2023 and reopened as the "Deep Sea Dodgems" at the end of August. Throughout its lifetime, the ride's entrance and exit gates have been modified several times although the actual ride has not been moved.	Bumper Bowl (1983–2002); Rocket Power Bumper Beach (2002–2011); Bumper Beach (2011–2012)

=== Former attractions prior to closure ===
Name	Opened	Closure	Manufacturer	Description	Previous names
Avalanche	1982	2012	Bertazzon Rides	A matterhorn ride which opened as one of Dreamworld's launch attractions in 1982. The Kid's World retheming reverted the ride to its former name. The ride closed on 15 July 2012 to make way for Pandamonium as part of the DreamWorks Experience re-theme.	Angry Beavers Spooty Spin (2002–2011)
Dora the Explorer's Sea Planes	1982	2010	TBC	Also known as "Dora's Soaring Seaplanes" on the ride sign, this was a fixed arm, rotating plane ride themed to the show of the same name. Prior to the Dora re-theme, the ride had been relocated to at least three different locations until staying in a specific spot. On 27 April 2010, the attraction was closed for maintenance. However, the attraction never reopened and by Late-2010 the attraction was removed entirely, including on the attraction listing and park map.	Red Baron (1982–2002)
SpongeBob SquarePants Water Play	2002	2006	Dreamworld	A themed water play area for children. The attraction was removed in 2006 following the start of local water restrictions.	N/A
Trolls Village	2018	2019	Dreamworld	A temporary walk-through attraction that existed from 2018 to 2019 based on Trolls that contained a show stage, play area, and food outlet. Meet and greets and character shows would be held daily featuring the characters Poppy, Branch and DJ Suki.	N/A

== Shopping and dining ==
=== Madagascar Cargo Hold ===
Madagascar Cargo Hold is a merchandise shop which sells Madagascar merchandise. It backs onto the Forever After's and was on the site of the former Nick Pics/Fun Snapz photo shop.

=== Forever After's ===
Forever After's is a merchandise shop which sells Shrek merchandise. It backs onto the Madagascar Cargo Hold and was on the site of the former Nick Pics/Fun Snapz photo shop.

=== Shrek's Treats ===
Shrek's Treats is a small food outlet located in the centre of the DreamWorks Experience precinct.
