= List of former Dreamworld attractions =

Possibly the original Dreamworld logo with a generic log ride hut, paddle steamer, single loop coaster, main entrance building, wooden style coaster and train pictured. Some of the attractions depicted in this logo never existed at the park.

The following is a list of attractions that previously existed at the Dreamworld amusement park on the Gold Coast, Queensland, Australia.

== Roller coasters and other attractions ==
=== ABC Kids World ===
- Big Red Car Ride (2005–2020) The Big Red Car Ride is a dark ride that takes 6 guests at a time on a 120-metre (390 ft) car journey through the Wiggles' house. The house features Wag's Kennel, Henry's Underwater Big Band, and Dorothy's rosy garden. The attraction opened with Wiggles World on 17 September 2005.
- Giggle and Hoot Hop and Hoot (2015–2019) was a Zamperla Jumping Star, which opened in 2015 and was removed without notice in mid-2019. The ride area was opened up as a pathway prior to its closure, with no plans for replacement.

=== Corroboree ===
- Farmyard Friends (2004–2009) was an indoor petting Zoo where guests could go up close to farm animals. The attraction could be accessed via the Captain Sturt Paddle Wheeler or through the tracks for the Dreamworld Express. The attraction closed in 2009 and was replaced by the Dreamworld Woolshed.

=== Nickelodeon Central, Kid's World, DreamWorks Experience and Kenny and Belinda's Dreamland ===
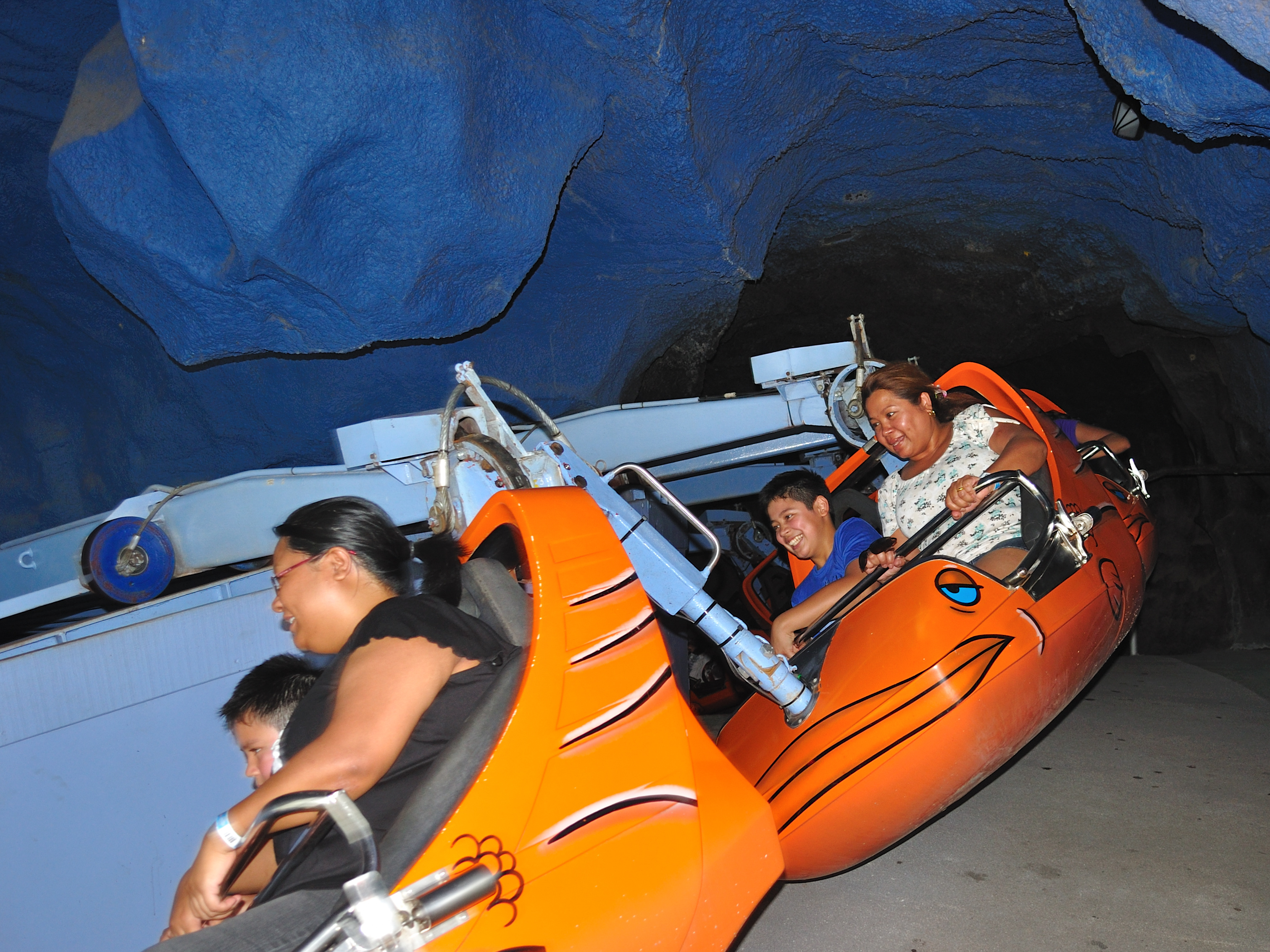
Avalanche (when it was Angry Beavers Spooty Spin)

- Avalanche (1983–2012) – A matterhorn ride manufactured by Bertazzon Rides. The ride originally opened as Avalanche in 1983 with Village Green. It was repainted and renamed to Angry Beavers Spooty Spin in 2002 to suit the new Nickelodeon theme. In 2011, the ride returned to its original name and theme. On 15 July 2012, the ride was closed to make way for Pandamonium, a thrill ride which is part of Kung Fu Panda: Land of Awesomeness.
- Dora the Explorer Sea Planes (1982–2010) – A fixed arm, rotating plane ride themed to Nickelodeon's Dora the Explorer. The ride originally opened as Red Baron in 1982, a year after Dreamworld opened. Due to the ride's portability, the ride has been moved several times throughout its lifetime. It originally operated as part of the Country Fair until it was moved to Village Green in the early 1990s. During its time in Village Green and Village Oval, the ride was moved to three different locations. Since the opening of Nickelodeon Central in 2002, the ride was not moved. On 27 April 2010, the ride closed for maintenance and has not operated since. The ride was removed in late 2010 from its position in the park in addition to it being removed from the attraction listing and park map.
- Soaring Swing (1982–2023) – A swinger ride. The ride first opened in 1982 as the Zumer and was located in the former Country Fair area (now Ocean Parade). In 2002, the ride was relocated to the new Nickelodeon Central area and renamed as Swinger Zinger. During the Kid's World debranding, the ride was given a repaint but kept its name. In 2012 it was renamed Puss in Boots Sword Swing as part of the DreamWorks Experience area. Its final name was a temporary name chosen as part of the retheme of the former DreamWorks area into the new Kenny and Belinda's Dreamland area. The ride closed at the end of May 2023 and was dismantled shortly afterwards to make way for the Big Red Boat Coaster.
- SpongeBob SquarePants Water Play (2002–2006) – A themed water play area for children has been left dry since the start of local water restrictions in 2006.
- Trolls Village (2018–2019) – A walk through attraction with a show stage, play area and food outlet, based on the 2016 DreamWorks Animation movie Trolls. Meet and greets and character shows would be held daily featuring the characters Poppy, Branch and DJ Suki.

=== Gold Rush Country ===
- BuzzSaw (2011–2021) was a Maurer Söhne SkyLoop roller coaster in the Town of Gold Rush. The roller coaster begain with a vertical chain lift hill to a height of 46.2 metres (152 ft). Riders, restrained by only a lap bar, are then pulled slowly back over on themselves before the train is released into a full heartline roll. A steep drop returns riders back to the station.
- Dreamworld Helicopters allowed park visitors to take helicopter flights taking in views of Dreamworld and the Gold Coast. Visitors could choose from five different flight paths. Joy flights incurred an additional expense. The helicopter tours have not resumed since June 2009 when a helicopter crashed in the carpark of Dreamworld causing only minor injuries.
- Eureka Mountain Mine Ride (1986–2006) was an indoor wild mouse roller coaster designed by HyFab. The ride was closed for maintenance in 2006 but never reopened. The ride remained dormant for nearly 12 years before being demolished in 2018. The park had considered reopening the attraction prior.

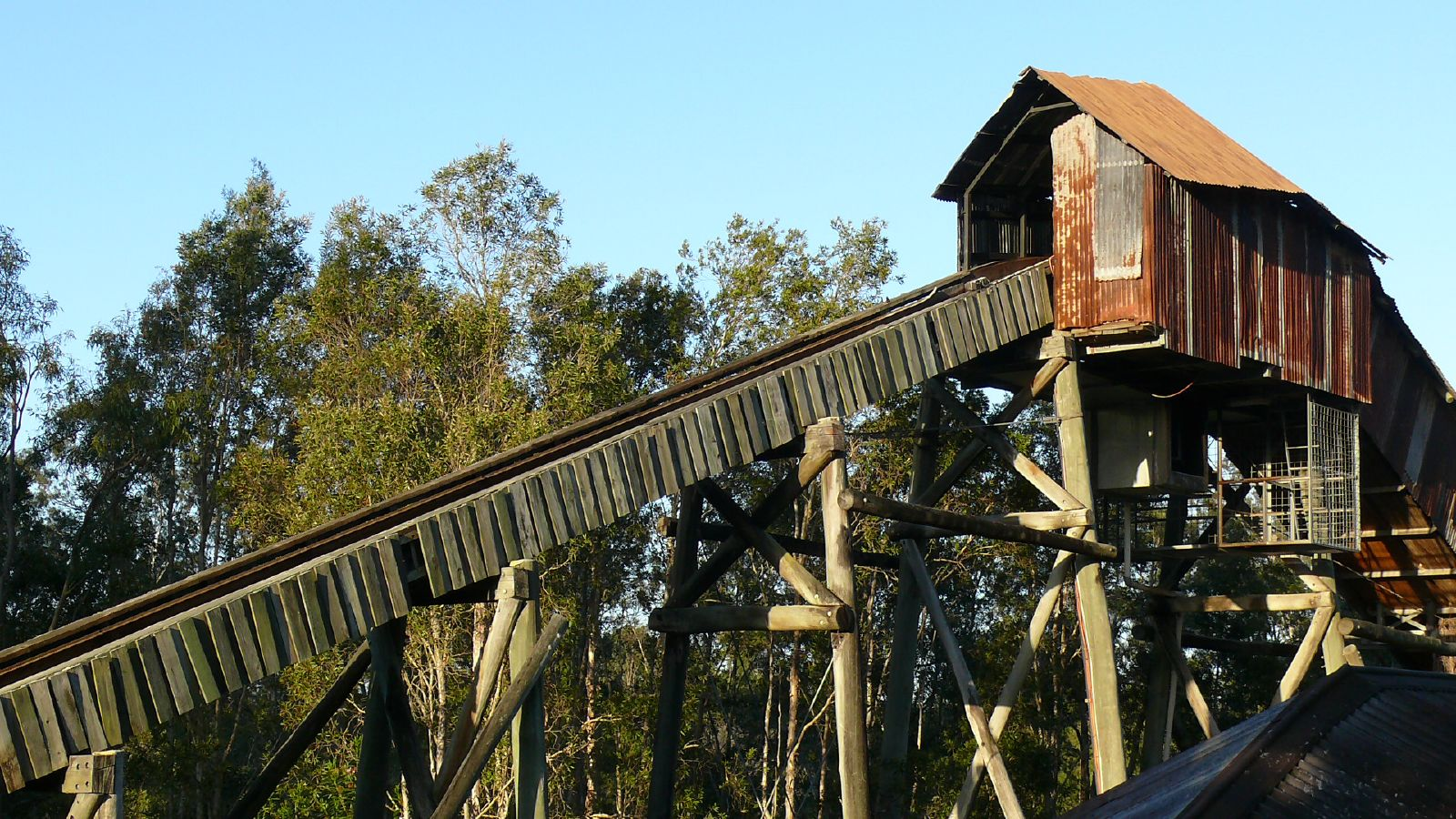
The final drop on the Log Ride.

- Rocky Hollow Log Ride (1981–2020) was a log flume which took groups of 4 riders on a gentle four and a half-minute cruise through channels, in and out of buildings, before ascending the lift hill. The ride concluded with a 50 kilometres per hour (31 mph) drop causing all riders to become soaked.
- Skylink Chairlift (1989–2005) was a chairlift which linked Gold Rush Country with the Australian Wildlife Experience. It commenced operation on 30 November 1989 and closed on 15 March 2005.
- Thunder River Rapids Ride (1986–2016) was Australia's only river rapid water ride since the closure of the Snowy River Rampage which operated at Wonderland Sydney. On 9 November 2016 the CEO of Dreamworld's parent company Ardent Leisure announced on that the ride would be decommissioned and demolished after the ride claimed the lives of four people on 25 October 2016.

=== Main Street ===
- Captain Sturt Paddle Wheeler (1981–2012) was a slow boat ride around the Murrissippi River. It originally featured a live show part way through its journey. The ride permanently closed in 2012 and the boat was scrapped the following year.
- Dreamworld Cinemas (1981–2018) was a movie theatre that originally opened in 1981 (as the IMAX Theatre). The theatre was refurbished in 2010 as part of Dreamworld's 30th Birthday, and became the Dreamworld Cinemas. In 2018, the cinema was permanently closed and was replaced by Sky Voyager in 2019.
- Illuminate Light & Laser Spectacular (2010–2012) was a light and laser show which is run seasonally during school holidays resulting in the park remaining open an extra two hours. It began in April 2010 with SpongeBob SquarePants and "Celebrate" shows. This was followed by Illuminate Winter Wonderland for the June and July school holidays featuring 4 lane, 40-metre (130 ft) long inflatable tube slide and a snow play area featuring 12,000 kilograms (26,000 lb) of snow.
- Motocoaster (2007-2026) was an Intamin motorcycle roller coaster. It opened in 2007, and was associated with Australian motorcyclist Mick Doohan until 2022. The ride permanently closed in 2026.
- Tower of Terror II (1997–2019) was an Intamin Reverse Free-fall coaster that debuted as the parks flagship attraction in 1997. It opened as the tallest and fastest Roller Coaster in the world and operated as the original Tower of Terror until 2010, when it received a revamp featuring a new backwards facing ride vehicle. This version of the ride operated until 3 November 2019, when the ride was officially retired to make way for new development. The park confirmed that the closing of Tower of Terror II would not affect The Giant Drop, as both rides occupy The Dreamworld Tower.

=== Ocean Parade ===
- AVPX (2009–2013) was a themed indoor laser skirmish attraction based on the Alien vs. Predator films. It was the biggest indoor laser skirmish attraction in Australia and was included in Dreamworld's admission price. It opened in April 2009 and closed in March 2013. It was replaced by Zombie Evilution in 2013.
- Brock's Garage (2015–2018) was a car museum with a collection of Peter Brock's race cars. The exhibit opened in November 2015 as part of the new Motorsports Experience precinct. The exhibit closed in 2018 and was replaced with a convention centre.

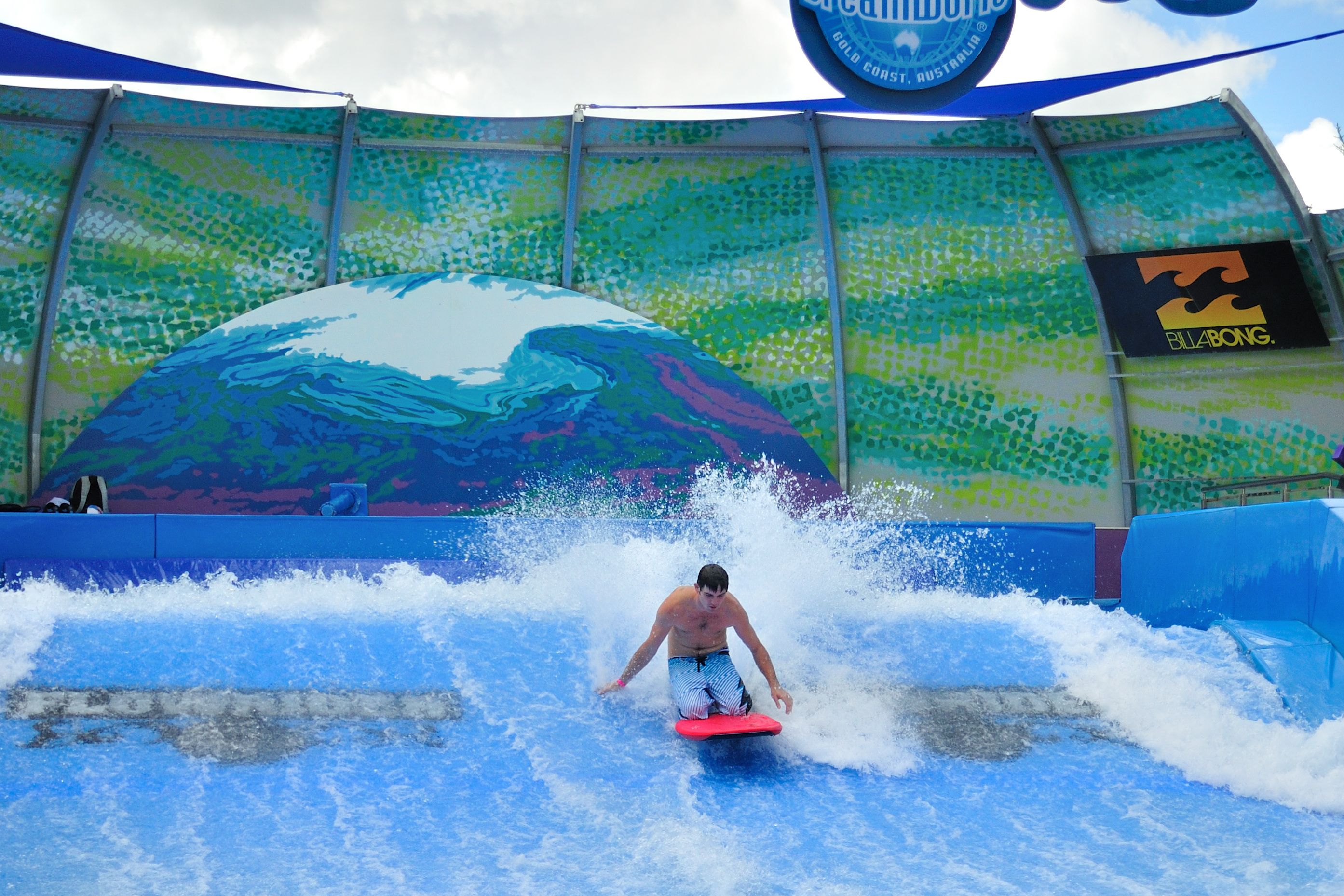
FlowRider

- FlowRider (2006–2020) is born from the roots of surfing, skateboarding, snowboarding and bodyboarding. It is set on an artificial wave created on a flexible, trampoline-like base. This was Australia's first FlowRider installation. During park hours the ride operates in bodyboard mode where groups of 15 riders share a 30-minute session on the ride. After park hours, stand-up boarding is made available for a 12 rider, hour-long session. The ride is a Wave Loch FlowRider.
- Grand Prix (1982–1992) was a go-kart track which operated from 1982 to 1992. The exact reason for the removal of this ride is still unknown, however it was possibly due to low ridership. The track was located beneath the Thunderbolt roller coaster.
- Reef Diver (1983–2014) was an SDC Enterprise which was painted bright yellow to stand out along with its Ocean Parade theming. The ride is no longer operating and has been replaced with a new ride Tail Spin. The ride reached speeds of up to 60 kilometres per hour (37 mph), and was suitable for guests 1 year of age and over (guests under 4 years of age had to be accompanied by an adult). Riders experienced g-forces up to 3g, reaching a height of 18.3 metres (60 ft).
- Rock Climbing Wall (2004–2014) was situated next to the Wipeout and was an ideal family attraction. Guests pay $5 to have a session on one of five different rock walls. It opened at the same time as The Claw, in September 2004. It was removed circa 2014.
- Stingray (1983–2012) was a rotating ride featuring controlled lifting and tilting movements with a capacity for 36 riders per dispatch. The ride is a Trabant manufactured by Chance Rides. It was originally known as the Roulette when it opened in 1983. It remained under that name until 1993 when Ocean Parade opened and it was rethemed to suit the beach theme. It closed in May 2012.
- The Claw (2004-2025) was an Intamin Gyro Swing. The ride was replaced by King Claw, in 2025.
- Thunderbolt (1982–2003) was Dreamworld's original roller coaster which opened in 1982 and was closed on 8 August 2003. The Thunderbolt also originally had a Go-Kart track operating next to the roller coaster.
- V8 Supercars RedLine (2008–2019) was Australia's first full-motion virtual V8 Supercars experience. For a cost of $10, drivers can race against 3 other drivers (in other simulators) as well as 21 computer drivers. V8 Supercars Red Line closed in October 2019.
- Vortex (1993–2009) was a park-model Gravitron. It was removed on 2 February 2009 to make way for the new Alien vs. Predator themed Laser Skirmish attraction named AVPX. The Vortex operated under the name Gravitron until 2002, when it was renamed to fit the Ocean parade theming. It was suitable for guests 1 year of age and over (guests under 4 years of age must be accompanied by an adult). It is unknown if the ride will eventually be re-located to another section of the park.
- Wipeout (1993–2019) was a Vekoma Waikiki Wave Super Flip, which opened in 1993 as the parks signature thrill attraction. The park announced in March 2019 that the ride will be retired and dismantled, and will not re-open from its maintenance period. It was replaced by Kickback Cove.
- Zombie Evilution (2013–2018) was a themed indoor laser skirmish attraction that replaced AVPX The attraction was originally introduced as a scare maze before being converted to a laser skirmish attraction. It opened on Friday the 13th of September 2013, replacing AVPX . in 2015 the attraction ran only during School Holidays as the Laser Tag and rans as a scare maze during the Screamworld events.

=== Village Oval ===
- Creature Cruise (1997–2000) – A gentle boat ride which flowed past hand crafted models of animals. It was opened in 1997 but closed in 2000 to make way for part of Kennyland.
- Little Puff (1983–1996) was a small train ride which took riders behind the Avalanche ride, up along the Enchanted Forest to the waterfall located on Main Street. The train then take riders back to the station. Little Puff was removed for the construction of Tower of Terror and Creature Cruise. Little Puff's train was preserved as a stationery photo opportunity in several parts of Main Street before being removed in 2019.

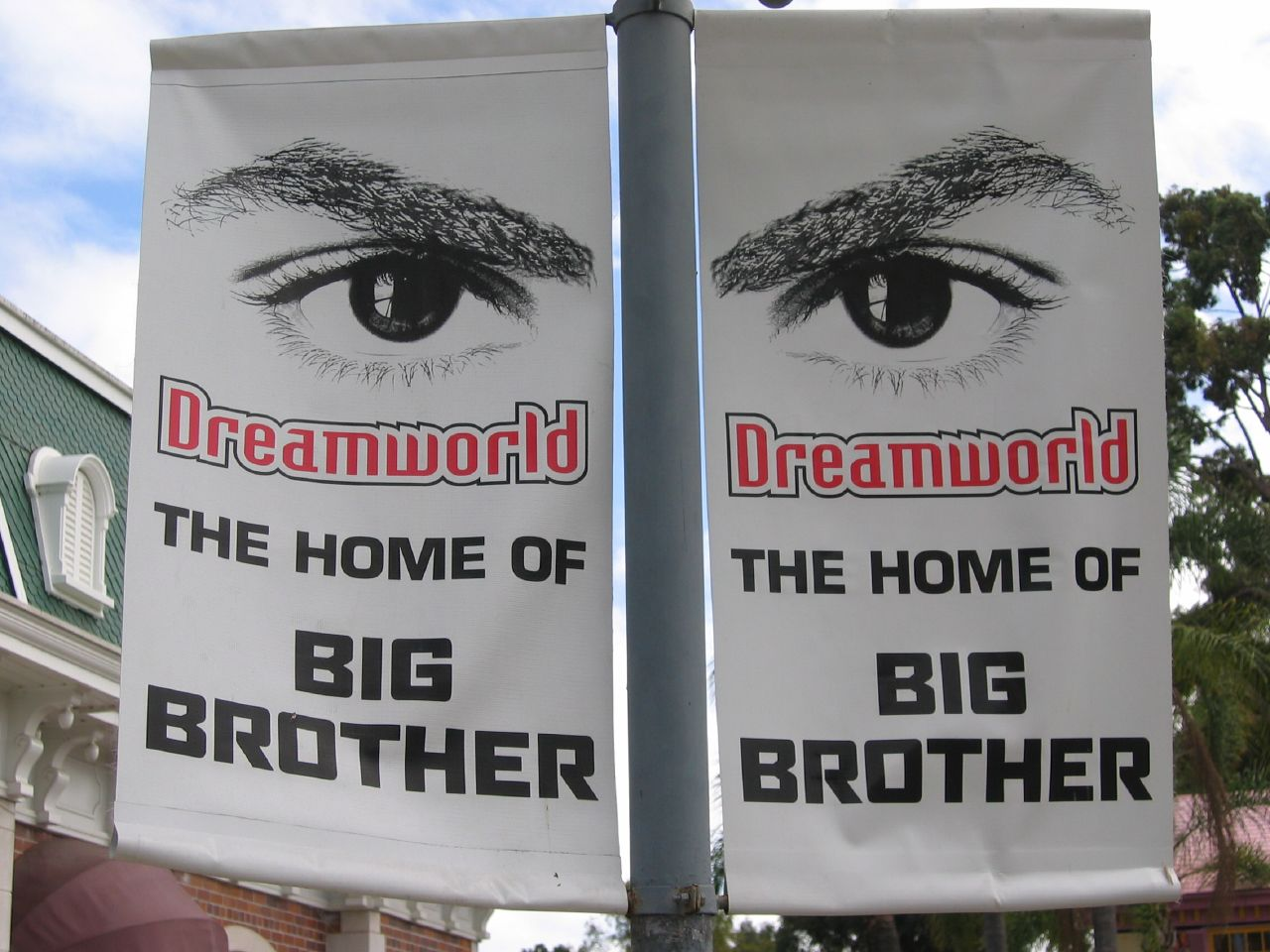
Dreamworld was once the home to the Australian Big Brother.

=== Dreamworld Studios ===
- Big Brother House Tours (2001–2008, 2012–2014) – The Australian version of the Big Brother reality show was filmed at Dreamworld. Between seasons (August to January), self-guided tours were allowed of the contestants' house, camera runs, and eviction stage. During seasons, guests could view the eviction stage (access to the stage itself is limited), the 'control room' (video editing room) and plasma screens displaying live feed from the house. Discretion was advised when bringing younger ones as video content was not censored. The Big Brother House was demolished after a fire significantly damaged it in 2019. The Dreamworld Studios area has also been demolished, to make way for a $50 million development announced a shareholders conference on 23 August 2019 by Ardent Leisure.
- Dreamworld Studios (1983–2019) was a large auditorium located next to Blue Lagoon.

== Temporary attractions ==
=== Moscow Circus ===
From 26 December 1998 to 24 January 1999 Dreamworld played host to Michael Edgley's all new Moscow Circus. The circus show was shown four times a day and was located off Village Oval in a back-of-house area. A cast of 16 circus performers included clowns, jugglers, trapeze artists, high-wire artists and motorcyclists.

=== Xtremeworld ===
Since the 1990s, Dreamworld has held Xtremeworld three times. Xtremeworld is a collection of stunts performed on skateboards, roller blades, BMX bikes and motocross. The first event was held inside the Thunderbolt roller coaster footprint with the queue and access within the former Go Kart station. The second event was held between the track of the Tower of Terror and the Dreamworld Railway. Both of these events were held outdoors several times throughout a day and featured a half pipe and a couple of motocross jumps. The third event was held inside a circus tent off Village Oval in a back-of-house area. It was held between 26 December 2005 and late January 2006 and combined many elements in a normal circus show with the stunts featured in previous Xtremeworlds.

=== Pirates of the Pacific ===
Pirates of the Pacific was a one-off circus style show themed to Pirates. It was held from 26 December 2007 through to late January 2008. The 30-minute show was set on a pirate ship which sat at the centre of a rectangular circus tent. The pirate ship concealed the poles to support the roof. The audience were seating in one of three grandstands which surrounded the pirate ship. The show featured stunts, lighting and pyrotechnics. It was located on the former location of the Thunderbolt roller coaster with an entrance beside the Vortex (now AVPX).

=== MTV Plugs Into Dreamworld ===
MTV Plugs Into Dreamworld (sometimes shortened to MTV Plugs In) was a temporary live show held in the Dreamworld Studios amphitheatre for the 2009–2010 summer school holidays. The show was run from 26 December 2009 to 22 January 2010. The thirty minute performance was shown 3 times a day and included a variety of music, dancing and stunts in a game show-like format.

=== Scare attractions ===
The following are temporary holiday attractions that operated at Dreamworld and were developed by Lynton V. Harris of Sudden Impact Entertainment.

- The Mummy Returns was the first of many temporary walk through scare attractions. Operated from 23 June 2001 to 8 July 2001.
- Lara Croft Tomb Raider – Enter the Tomb was a walkthrough temporary attraction based on the second movie "The Cradle of Life". It featured fog filled narrow passageways, lighting effects and live actors. It opened on 26 December 2003 and closed four months later on 18 April 2004. It was located in the Gum Tree Gully Theatre.
- Nightmares was a temporary scary experience walkthrough attraction featuring two different sections: The Freezer and Angoscia. It operated from 26 December 2006 through to 7 July 2007.
- The Mummy: Tomb of the Dragon Emperor Live was the fourth temporary scary walkthrough attraction for the park. This attraction was open for a limited season between September 2008 and January 2009.

== Themed areas ==
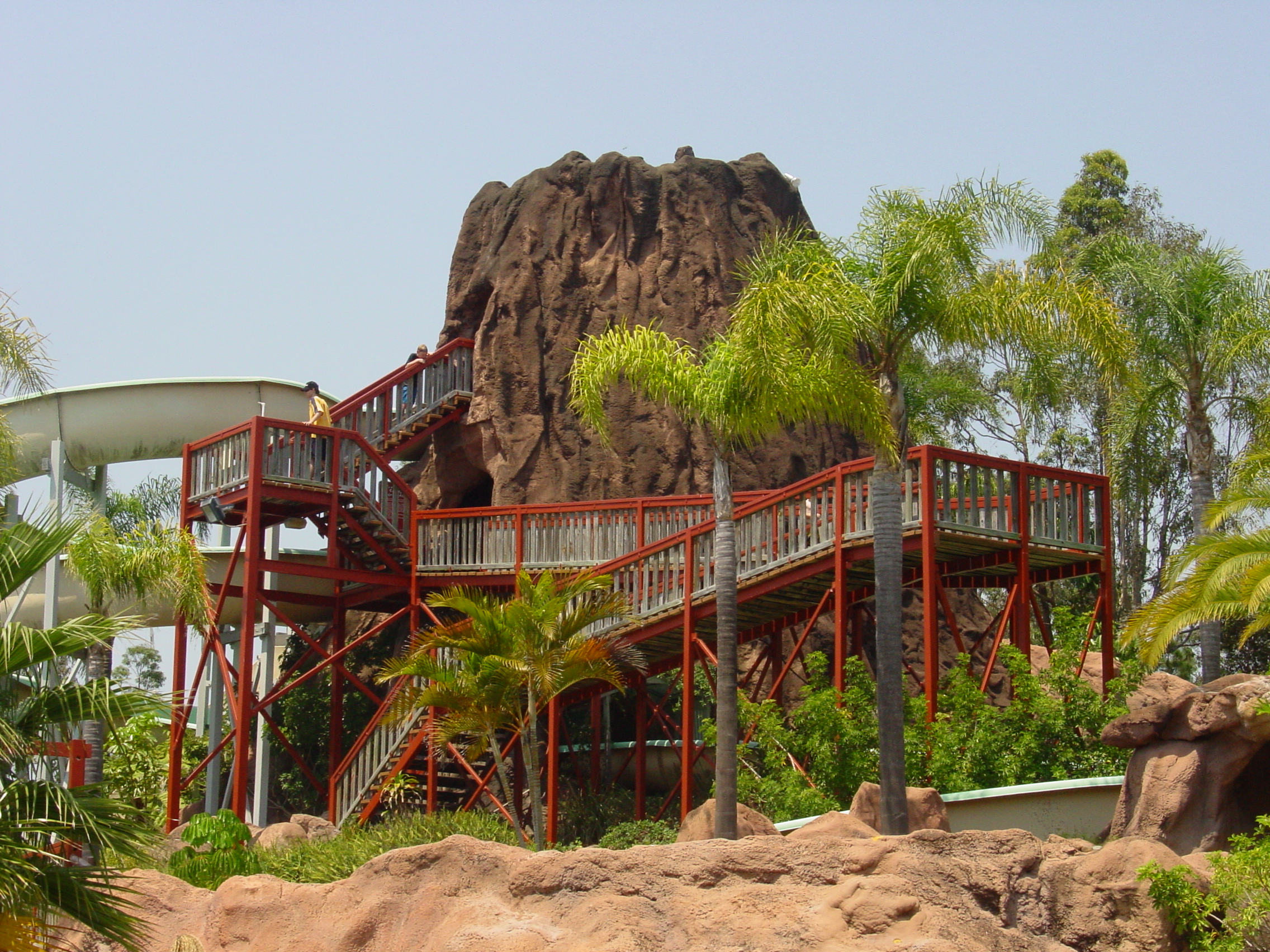
Looking up at Blue Lagoon's mountain which was the launch area for the three slides.

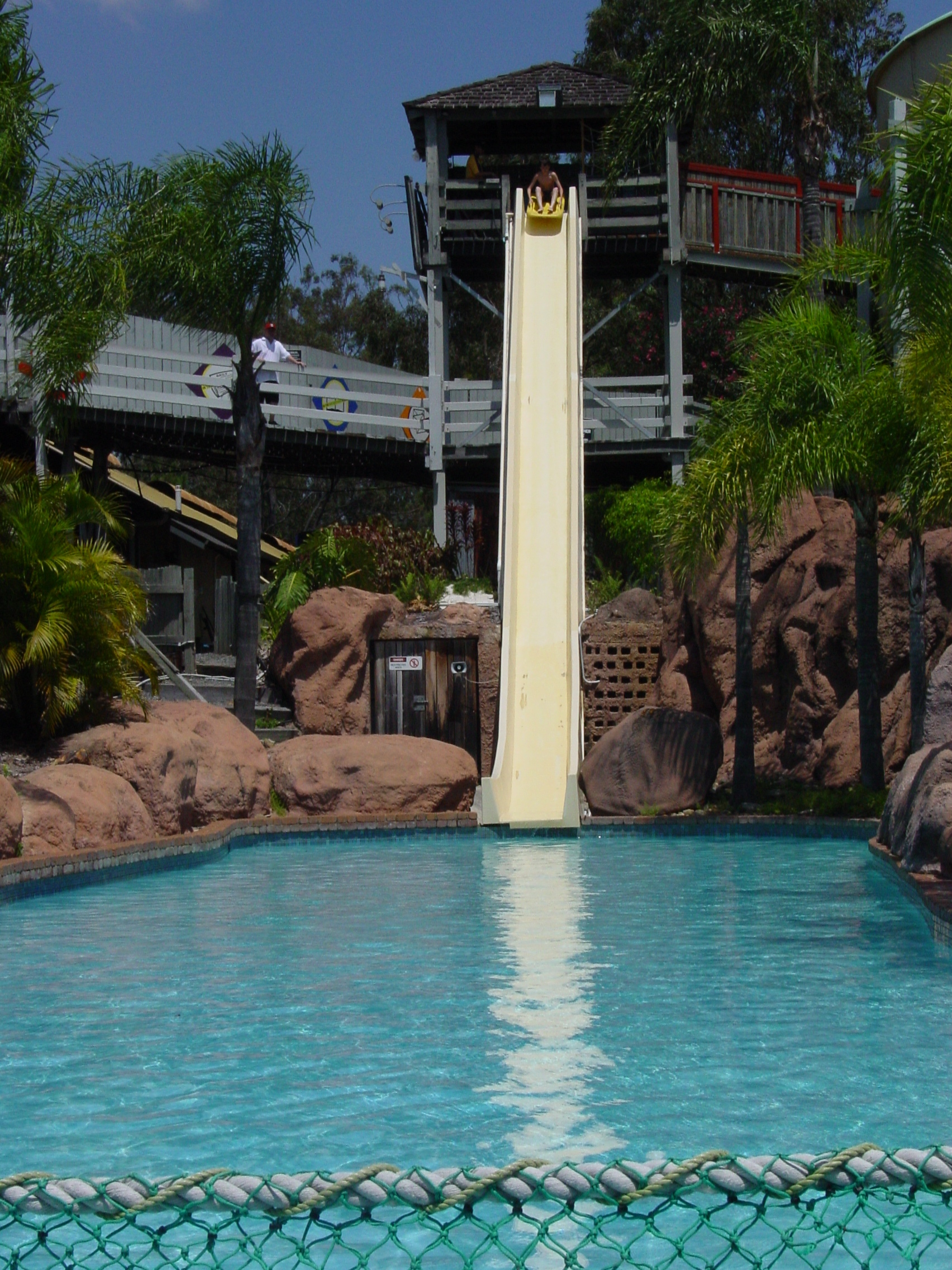
The Toboggan at Blue Lagoon.

=== Blue Lagoon ===
Blue Lagoon was Dreamworld's water park until it closed in April 2006. It opened in 1983 with a large pool, a children's pool and 3 water slides. The Aqualoop Flume was a body slide which featured several helices before a splashdown in the main pool. Krakatoa's Revenge was the second slide to launch directly off the mountain. This tube slide was terrain based and weaved its way down the mountain before a splashdown in the main pool. The third slide was the Toboggan. It was launched from a separate tower attached to the mountain. Riders would sit on a hard plastic toboggan and would plunge down a steep drop and stop in a specially designed pool. Blue Lagoon's closure was just months before WhiteWater World opened as a separate ticketed complex adjacent to Dreamworld. The area has since been used for various temporary scare attractions in addition to The Dream Room function centre.

=== Country Fair ===
Country Fair was a themed area located where Ocean Parade now stands. Country Fair opened one year after Dreamworld in 1982. It originally featured very few rides but more were added in 1983. In 1993, when the Wipeout opened, the northern end of Country Fair was converted into Ocean Parade. By 2002 the remaining rides in Country Fair were renamed and rethemed to fit the Ocean Parade theme. Ocean Parade currently covers all of the land previously occupied by Country Fair. On 8 March 2019, Dreamworld announced that it would be retiring the Wipeout, and the space would be converted into a shaded seating area.

=== Gum Tree Gully ===
Gum Tree Gully was located in a portion of Rivertown where Wiggles World is currently located. The Gum Tree Gully Theatre housed musicals such as Outback Celebration and the Koala Country Jamboree. The area was also used for the Kids' Carnival, a temporary children's area during the construction of Nickelodeon Central in 2002. In 2003 and 2004 the theatre was used for the Lara Croft Tomb Raider – Enter the Tomb temporary scare attraction. Gum Tree Gully was converted into Wiggles World which opened in 2005. The Big Red Car Ride operated inside the building where the theatre once was from 2005 to 2020.

- Koala Country Jamboree : An animatronic show inspired by Disneyland's Country Bear Jamboree and It's a Small World, where koalas and other animals sang Australian and American-themed songs. The show would end with all the animals singing Peter Allen's "I Still Call Australia Home", and the grand finale "Tie Me Kangaroo Down, Sport". The animatronics were designed by Hofmann Figuren, with Paul Hollibone of Dreamworld - Remembering the Golden Years on Facebook calling them "the first style of animatronics of it's [sic] kind in Australia".

=== Kennyland ===
Kennyland was constructed in the northern portion of the Village Oval and was themed after Dreamworld's main mascot Kenny Koala. Three rides and a meet and greet area were located undercover while a fourth ride was located outside. Wild Wheels was a track ride which featured a variety of different cars connected in one train. Riders would board one of several cars and would be taken twice around an oval shaped circuit which featured a hill and several s-bends. Kenny Karts was a series of children sized electric bumper cars located in a small oval shaped roadway. Adventure Trails was a jumping castle which was split into two distinct sections each themed after Kenny and Belinda respectively. Dreamcopter was the only outdoor ride of the section and featured small helicopters mounted to a central rotating pole. Riders were able to control the height of their helicopter through a joystick. Kennyland opened in 2000 and closed early in 2002 for the construction of Nickelodeon Central. The only ride still operating at the park was Dreamcopter which was known as Blues Skidoo up until its removal in 2011. The meet and greet area was also used for the Kenny & Friends Party in the Park Show.

=== Kids' Carnival ===
Kids' Carnival was a temporary themed children's area which briefly existed in 2002. Three of the four rides of Kennyland were moved to Gum Tree Gully in early 2002 to aid in the construction of Nickelodeon Central. The Dreamcopter was located to outside the Gum Tree Gully Theatre. Adventure Trails was located beside the Murrissipi River near the Gum Tree Gully Theatre. Finally, Kenny Karts was located inside a building alongside the Murrissipi River. It was closed in late 2002 just before Nickelodeon Central opened. Dreamcopter was relocated and later rethemed to Blues Skidoo in Nickelodeon Central.

=== Koala Country ===
Koala Country was Dreamworld's original animal area. It began simply showcasing koalas but quickly grew to feature several Australian animals including kangaroos and crocodiles. Dreamworld invested millions of dollars in the redevelopment of Koala Country into the Australian Wildlife Experience.

=== Nickelodeon Central ===
Nickelodeon Central replaced Village Oval and Kennyland in 2002. In 2011, Dreamworld's contract with Nickelodeon was terminated resulting in the area's retheme to Kid's World.

=== Kid's World ===
"Kid's World" was a temporary replacement of Nickelodeon Central when the contract with Nickelodeon expired, the area was replaced by DreamWorks Experience in 2012. This area consisted of all of the same rides, with different names, and little-to-no theming.

=== DreamWorks Experience ===
DreamWorks Experience was an area themed to DreamWorks Animation franchises. It replaced Kid's World in 2012. This area was replaced by Kenny and Belinda's Dreamland in 2023.

=== Village Oval ===
Village Oval was a collection of rides which are all now a part of Kid's World. The area was originally named Village Green when it opened in 1983. The name was changed to Village Oval in 1998. When the Tower of Terror opened in 1997, its entrance was originally located in Village Oval. In early 2002, during the construction of Nickelodeon Central, the entrance was moved to the other side of the ride near Tiger Island. Rides included Bumper Bowl (now Bumper Beach), Carousel (now Mighty-Go-Round), Red Baron (most recently Dora the Explorer Sea Planes before its removal) and Avalanche.

=== Motorsports Experience ===
Motorsports Experience was a Motorsport themed area that opened in 2015 and closed in 2020. The area is located between Ocean Parade and Whitewater World. It housed the Hot Wheels Sidewinder, Brocks Garage and the V8 Supercars RedLine along with Grid's Burger and Sports Bar and the Trackside retailer. In 2018, the Motorsports Experience area started slowly merging back to Ocean Parade with Brock’s Garage becoming the Dreamworld Exhibition Centre and V8 Supercars Redline being removed. Hot Wheels Sidewinder was refurbished and rethemed in 2020, abolishing the remains of the Motorsports Experience.

=== Stage ===
Stage replaced the concert in 2004. In 2004, Hi-5 Live! at Dreamworld was opened, getting Hi-5 Holiday video and DVD and wait until closed.
