= Kennyland =

Defunct themed area at Dreamworld

- Interactive map of Kennyland
- Theme: Kenny Koala

Attractions
- Total: 5
- Other rides: 4
- Shows: 1

Dreamworld
- Coordinates: 27.863884°S 153.316564°E
- Status: Defunct
- Opened: 26 December 1999
- Closed: 2002
- Replaced by: Nickelodeon Central

Kennyland was a themed area at the Dreamworld theme park on the Gold Coast, Australia. It was an area featuring a variety of children's attractions from 1999 until 2002 at which time it was replaced with a larger Nickelodeon-themed area called Nickelodeon Central.

== History ==
In 1999, Dreamworld set about designing a dedicated children's area in the northern portion of Village Oval where the Creature Cruise was operating at the time. As part of the construction process Creature Cruise was converted into a walkthrough attraction. On 26 December 1999, Kennyland officially opened to the public. It featured four new attractions: Adventure Trails, Dream Copters, Kenny Karts and Wild Wheels.

In early 2002, Kennyland and most of Village Oval was closed to make way for the development of Nickelodeon Central. Following the area's closure, many of the rides were relocated to Rivertown where they operated as part of the Kid's Carnival. The Kid's Carnival featured Adventure Trails, Dream Copters and Kenny Karts, as well as a temporary children's Ferris wheel. Towards the end of 2002, the Dream Copters were relocated into Nickelodeon Central where it operated under the same name and theme (it was later rethemed to Blue's Skidoo and Dronkey Flyers). The other rides in the Kid's Carnival were removed from the park entirely. On 26 December 2002, Nickelodeon Central officially opened to the public.

== Attractions ==
Kennyland was made up of four attractions. Most of them were located inside a large shed, however, the Dream Copters were located outside.

- Adventure Trails – a jumping castle which was split into two distinct sections each themed after Kenny Koala and Belinda Brown, respectively.
- Dream Copters – a Mini Jet ride designed by SBF Visa Group. It was the only outdoor ride of the section and featured small helicopters mounted to a central rotating pole. Riders were able to control the height of their helicopter through a joystick. This ride is currently operating as Dronkey Flyers as part of the DreamWorks Experience.
- Kenny Karts – a set of children's bumper cars designed by SBF Visa Group. It was a series of child-sized electric bumper cars located in a small oval shaped roadway.
- Wild Wheels – a SBF Visa Group Convoy ride. It was a track ride which featured a variety of different cars connected in one train. Riders would board one of several cars and would be taken twice around an oval shaped circuit which featured a hill and several s-bends.

The area also had a meet and greet area which was used as a show venue for the Kenny & Friends Party in the Park Show during inclement weather.

== See also ==
- DreamWorks Experience
- Wiggles World
- Kenny and Belinda's Dreamland
