= Kenny's Forest Flyer =

Roller coaster

- Previously known as Escape Coaster (2022–2023); Escape from Madagascar (2012–2022); Sky Rocket (2011–2012); Rugrats Runaway Reptar (2002–2011)
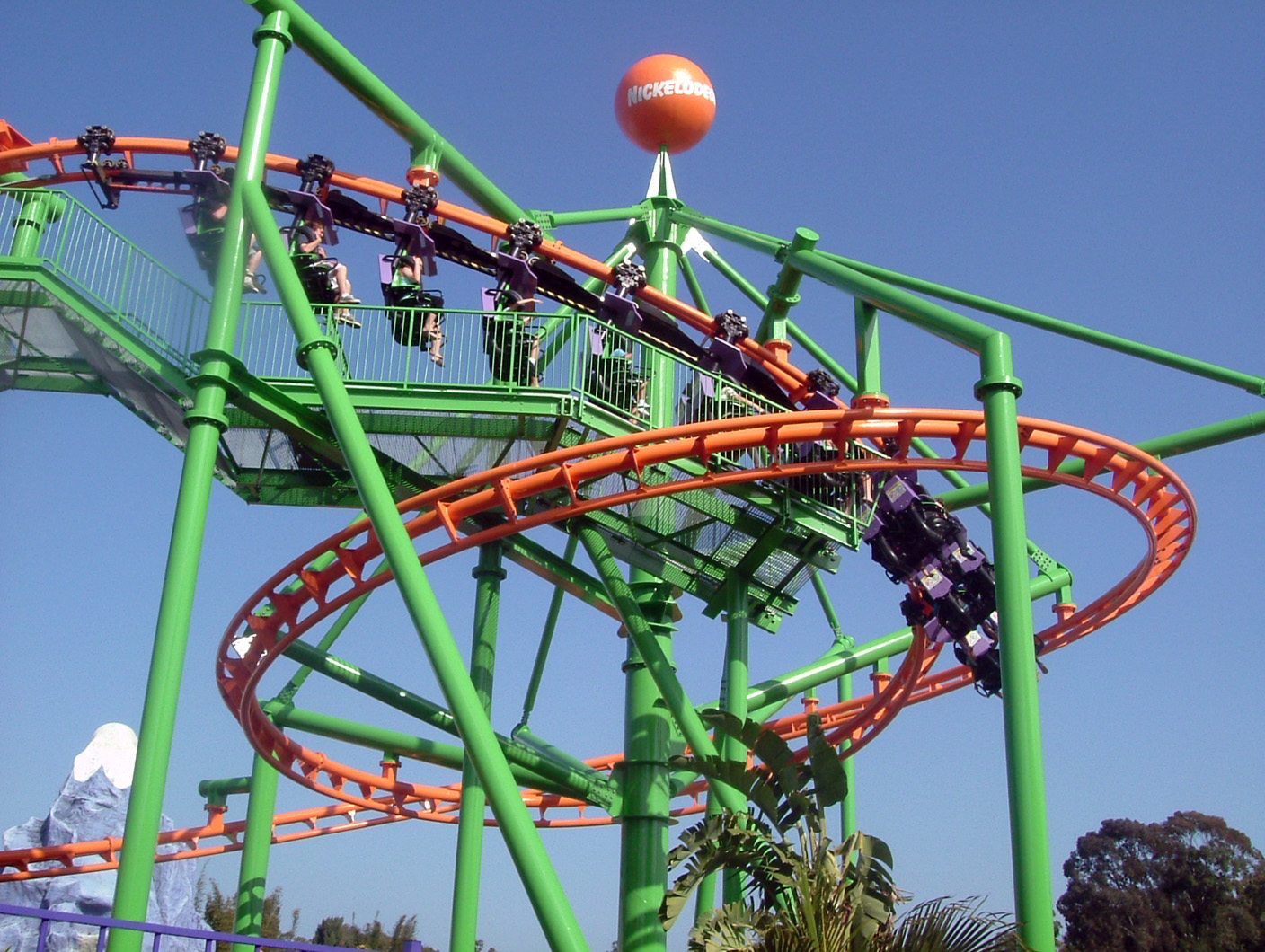
- Kenny's Forest Flyer's first helix (pictured as Rugrats Runaway Reptar)

Dreamworld
- Location: Dreamworld
- Park section: Kenny and Belinda's Dreamland
- Coordinates: 27°51′50″S 153°19′1″E
- Status: Operating
- Opening date: 26 December 2002

General statistics
- Type: Steel – Suspended Family Coaster
- Manufacturer: Vekoma
- Model: Suspended Family Coaster (342m)
- Lift/launch system: Drive tire lift hill
- Height: 14.9 m (49 ft)
- Length: 342 m (1,122 ft)
- Speed: 41.8 km/h (26.0 mph)
- Inversions: 0
- Duration: 1:30
- Capacity: 650 riders per hour
- G-force: 2.2
- Height restriction: 110 cm (3 ft 7 in)
- Trains: Single train with 10 cars; riders arranged 2 across in a single row for a total of 20 riders per train
- Ride Express available
- Kenny's Forest Flyer at RCDB

Kenny's Forest Flyer is a suspended family roller coaster at Dreamworld on the Gold Coast, Queensland, Australia.

== History ==
Kenny's Forest Flyer opened on 26 December 2002 as Rugrats Runaway Reptar. It was part of the new Nickelodeon Central themed area. The roller coaster was the third of its type in the world and the first in the Southern Hemisphere.

Towards the middle of 2011, Nickelodeon Central started to be rethemed into Kid's World. The change saw Rugrats Runaway Reptar renamed and rethemed into Sky Rocket. The ride remains to be Dreamworld's only children's roller coaster.

In 2012, the Kid's World area was rethemed to become DreamWorks Experience. The ride was renamed Escape from Madagascar to fit the Madagascar Madness subsection it is located in.

In November 2022, it was announced that DreamWorks Experience would be rethemed as Kenny and Belinda's Dreamland, with all DreamWorks theming to be removed. Escape from Madagascar was temporarily named the Escape Coaster until it closed for refurbishment on 24 April 2023. It reopened in late August 2023 under its new name – Kenny's Forest Flyer.

== Ride ==
The ride has one train, which has 10 cars with 2 seats on each car catering 650 riders per hour. The safety system consists of over-the-shoulder restraints that lock into place and then a belt-type connector that attaches the seat base to the over-the-shoulder restraints. Riders are taken up 14.8 metres (49 ft) by a wheeled lift hill, and go through a tight helix, followed by a series of small turns and drops. Upon approaching the station, the ride is slowed by a magnetic brake run. Each ride cycle takes 1.5 minutes.
