= Serpent Slayer =

Amusement ride

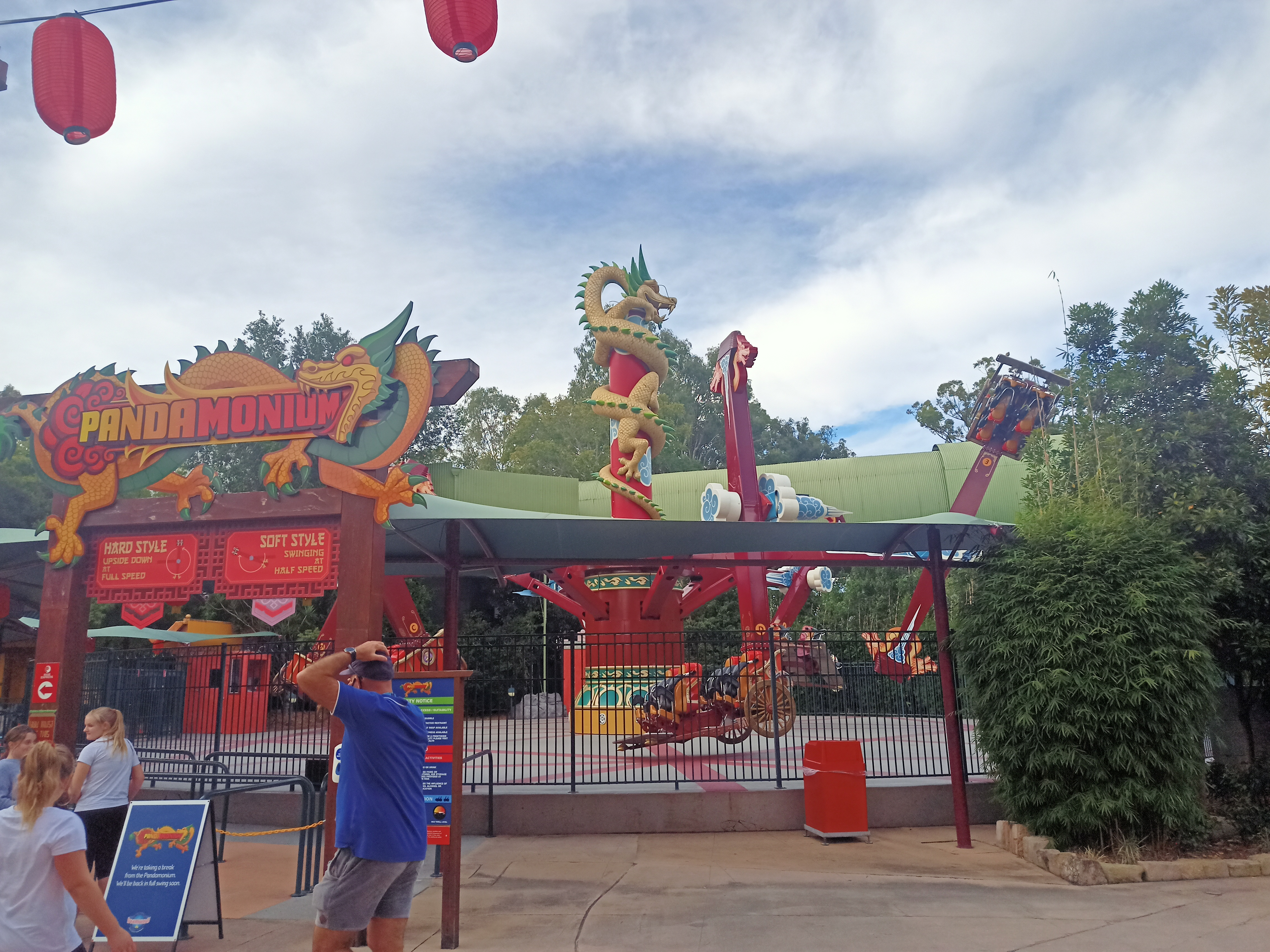
- Serpent Slayer (pictured as Pandamonium) running its hard style cycle.

Dreamworld
- Area: Ocean Parade
- Status: Operating
- Soft opening date: 21 December 2012
- Opening date: 26 December 2012
- Replaced: Avalanche

Ride statistics
- Manufacturer: Zamperla
- Model: Air Race 6.4
- Height: 12 m (39 ft)
- Drop: 8 m (26 ft)
- Speed: 8.5 rpm
- G-force: 3.8
- Capacity: 480 riders per hour
- Vehicle type: Pulled rickshaw
- Vehicles: 6
- Riders per vehicle: 4
- Rows: 2
- Riders per row: 2
- Duration: 2:30
- Height restriction: 120 cm (3 ft 11 in)
- Ride Express available

Serpent Slayer is an amusement ride in the Ocean Parade area of Dreamworld on the Gold Coast, Australia. The Zamperla Air Race 6.4 ride is featured as one of Dreamworld's Big 9 Thrill Rides. The ride was previously known as Pandamonium, as part of the "Land of Awesomeness" area within the DreamWorks Experience precinct, and was themed to the Kung-Fu Panda films.

== History ==
In mid-2011, the outgoing CEO of Dreamworld, Noel Dempsey, leaked Dreamworld's plans to team up with DreamWorks Animation on his LinkedIn profile page. On 10 November 2011, Dreamworld officially announced a three-stage plan to incorporate DreamWorks Animation films and characters into its theme park. The first phase was the DreamWorks Holiday Shrektacular Show which ran throughout the summer peak period, with the second being the retheming of Dreamworld's kids area into a 8,400-square-metre (90,000 sq ft) DreamWorks Experience precinct which opened in March 2012. The final phase announced was the development of an eating and meet-and-greet area called Kung Fu garden. Throughout 2012, the Kung Fu garden concept evolved into the Kung Fu Panda: Land of Awesomeness.

The construction of Kung Fu Panda: Land of Awesomeness began in July 2012 with the closure and demolition of Avalanche. On 3 September 2012, the Bumper Beach was closed to aid in construction. The park previously announced that additional rides and attractions would be added to the area in December 2012. The headline attraction would be Pandamonium which would be the park's 8th thrill ride. Other attractions included Skadoosh and Kung Fu Academy. Kung Fu Panda: Land of Awesomeness, along with Pandamonium, soft opened on 21 December 2012 with an official opening held on 26 December 2012.

Ardent Leisure, the owners of Dreamworld, added Pandamonium in an attempt to expand the park's ride inventory. Five months after the ride opened Ardent Leisure reported that Pandamonium, coupled with the rest of the DreamWorks Experience precinct and the return of Big Brother Australia, gave the park a "strong foundation for building future market share".

In November 2022, Dreamworld announced that Pandamonium would be rethemed as part of an expansion of the Ocean Parade precinct after the closure of the DreamWorks Experience precinct. The ride reopened in April 2023 as the Serpent Slayer.

== Characteristics ==
Serpent Slayer is one of Dreamworld's seven thrill rides alongside The Claw, The Gold Coaster, The Giant Drop, Mick Doohan's Motocoaster, Steel Taipan and Tail Spin. Dreamworld offers their virtual queuing system, Ride Express, for popular rides in the park, including Pandamonium.

Designed by Italian firm Zamperla, Serpent Slayer is a themed version of their Air Race 6.4 model. It consists of six vehicles themed as pulled rickshaws. Each vehicle holds four riders in two rows of two. Riders are secured by over-the-shoulder restraints.

== Ride experience ==
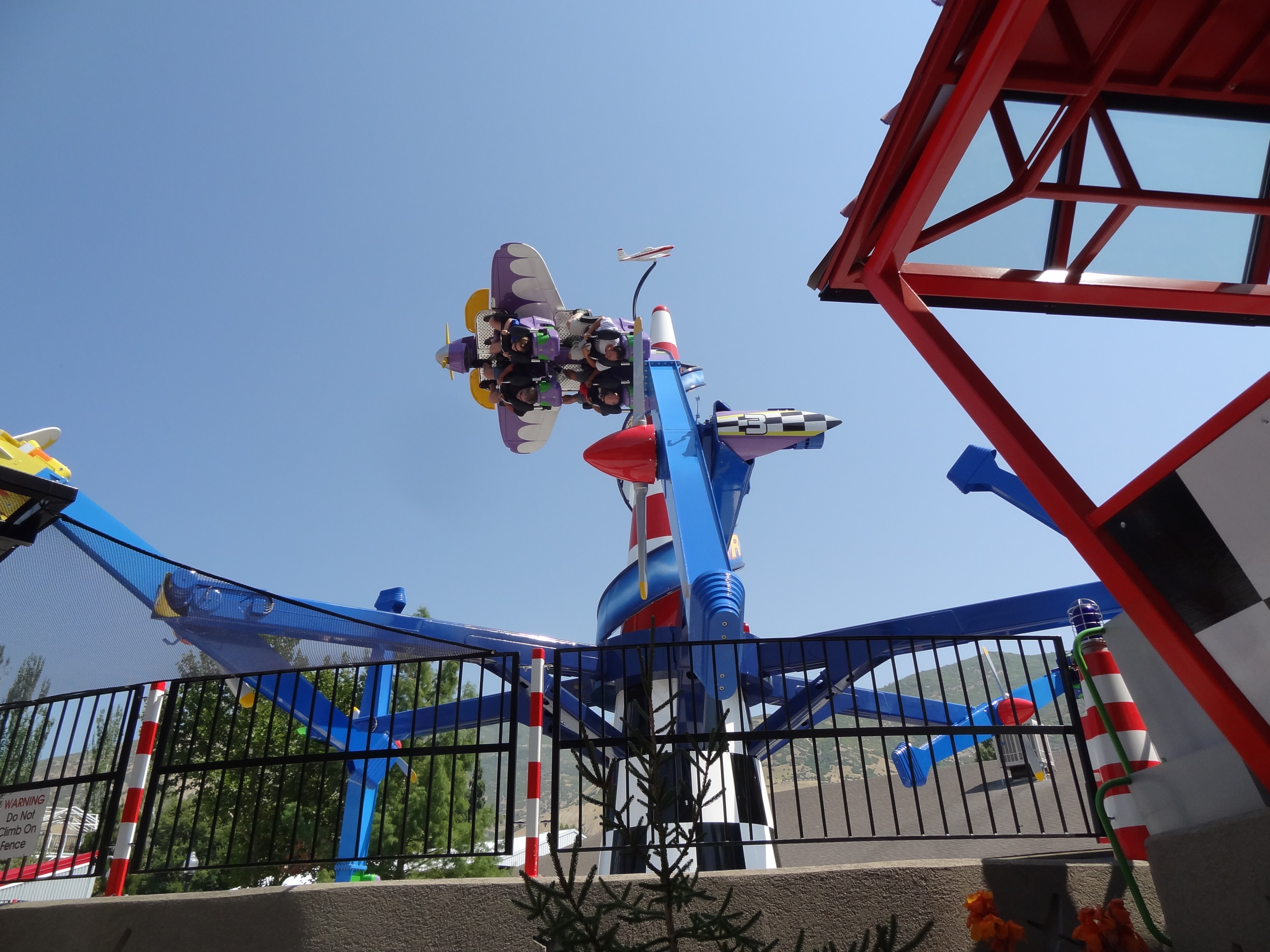
Pandamonium is similar to Air Race at Lagoon Amusement Park (pictured)

Serpent Slayer offers two ride experiences with different intensity factors. The first cycle type is a thrill ride experience. The ride begins with the vehicles slowly rotating around a centre column in a similar style to an aerial carousel. Each vehicle begins to swing from side to side. Momentum builds and the vehicles eventually swing upside down at a height of 8 metres (26 ft). This results in riders experiencing up to 3.8 times the force of gravity. The alternative experience is designed for kids and sees the ride vehicles swing from side to side whilst rotating around the central column. Both cycles last for 2 minutes and 30 seconds each.
