= Kenny and Belinda's Dreamland =

Themed land at Dreamworld amusement park

- Interactive map of Kenny and Belinda's Dreamland
- Theme: Dreamworld and ABC Kids characters

Attractions
- Total: 11
- Roller coasters: 2
- Other rides: 6
- Shows: 3

Dreamworld
- Coordinates: 27.864475°S 153.316140°E
- Status: Operating
- Opened: 31 March 2023
- Replaced: DreamWorks Experience

Kenny and Belinda's Dreamland is a themed area at the Dreamworld amusement park on the Gold Coast, Queensland, Australia. The area based around Dreamworld mascot and characters as well as characters from certain ABC Kids shows. Phase 1 of the area opened on 31 March 2023, with the area fully opening 23 December of that year. The area replaced the former DreamWorks Experience themed land.

== History ==
The area of Kenny and Belinda's Dreamland was first known as Village Oval. In 2000, the northern portion of Village Oval became Kennyland, a themed area based around Kenny Koala, one of the park's mascots. In 2004 Dreamworld partnered with Nickelodeon and opened the Nickelodeon Central themed area, replacing Kennyland. In 2012, Nickelodeon Central was replaced with the DreamWorks Experience area.

On 24 November 2022, Dreamworld announced a $55m investment to the park, which included Kenny and Belinda's Dreamland, a new themed area to replace the existing DreamWorks Experience area. The area is expected to receive rebranded and refurbished rides and attractions as well as new attractions under the Bananas in Pyjamas, Play School, The Wiggles and traditional Dreamworld branding. Only two attractions from ABC Kids World were moved into the new area.

== Rides and attractions ==
=== Current attractions ===
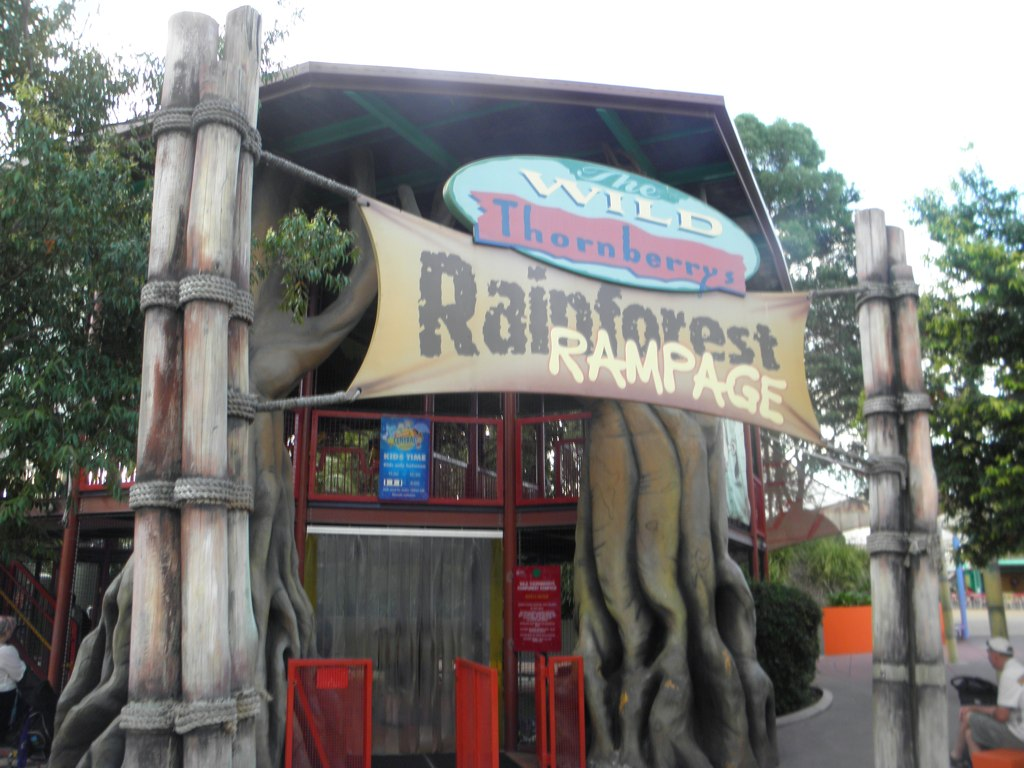
Belinda's Treehouse (pictured as Wild Thornberrys' Rainforest Rampage) in 2010.

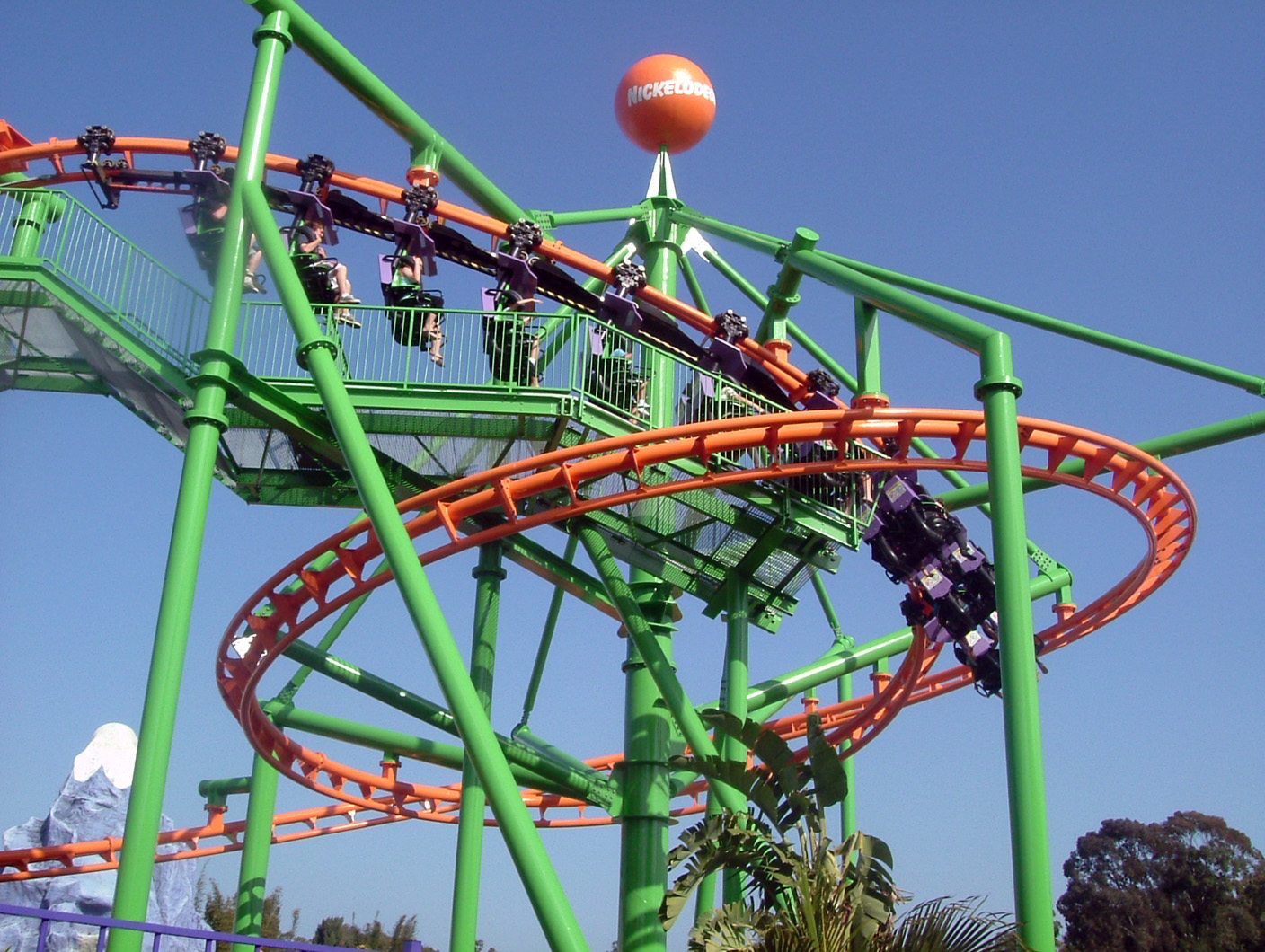
Forest coaster (pictured as Runaway Reptar Roller Coaster) in 2006.

Name	Opened	Manufacturer	Type	Description	Former name(s)
Bananas In Pyjamas Carousel	1983	Ferrari	Carousel	Based on Bananas in Pyjamas. The attraction originally opened in 1983 within the former Village Green-themed area, and within Nickelodeon Central has since gained a specific theme.	Carousel (1983–2002); Nick-O-Round (2002–2008); Backyardigans Mighty-Go-Round (2008–2011); Mighty-Go-Round (2011–2012); Shrek's Ogre-Go-Round (2012–2022)
Bananas In Pajamas Fun Maze	2015	Dreamworld	Themed Maze	Based on Bananas in Pyjamas. The attraction originally opened in 2015 at ABC Kids World and was relocated to Kenny and Belinda's Dreamland prior to the closure of the area. The attraction reopened in September 2023.	N/A
Belinda's Treehouse	2002	Dreamworld	Ball Play Area	The attraction opened with Nickelodeon Central in 2002. The ride reopened in Early-2023 under its current Belinda Brown theme.	Wild Thornberry's Rainforest Rampage (2002–2011); Rainforest Rampage (2011–2012); MAD Jungle Jam (2012–2022)
Big Red Boat Coaster	2023	Zamperla	Junior powered roller coaster	Themed to The Wiggles. Opened on 23 December 2023 as part of the area's second phase, and replaced Soaring Swing. It is the second Wiggles themed roller coaster to exist, the other being Romp Bomp A Stomp (now Streamliner Coaster) at Six Flags Fiesta Texas.	N/A
Big Red Planes	2000	SBF Visa Group	Junior rotating Plane ride	Themed to The Wiggles and first opened in the former Kennyland area. The current incarnation of the ride was completely rebuilt from scratch to fit the new theme. Throughout the years of its existence, the ride has seen many changes in its ride vehicles.	Dream Copters (2000–2002); Blue's Skidoo (2003–2012); Dronkey's Flyers (2012–2022)
The Dreamworld Theatre	2002	Dreamworld	Stage Show attraction	Currently showcases the Wiggly Friends Show among other live shows. Opened with Nickelodeon Central in 2002.	Slime Bowl (2002–2011); Dreambowl (2011–2012); King Julian's Theatre in the Wild (2012–2022)
Humpty-Go-Round	2008	Zamperla	Kite flyer	Based on Play School. The attraction opened in 2008 and was the only new addition to the Nickelodeon Central area since its opening. The ride closed for refurbishment in August 2023 and reopened in mid-September under its current name and theme.	SpongeBob FlyPants (2008–2011); Kite Flyer (2011–2012); Gingy's Glider (2012–2022); Candy Flyer (2022–2023)
Kenny's Forest Flyer	2002	Vekoma	Suspended family roller coaster	First opened with Nickelodeon Central in 2002, and the third coaster of its type in the world. The coaster closed for refurbishment in late April 2023 and reopened under its current Kenny Koala name and theme in August 2023.	Rugrats Runaway Reptar (2002–2011); Sky Rocket (2011–2012); Escape from Madagascar (2012–2022); Escape Coaster (2022–2023)
Play School Wheel	2018	Zamperla	Mini Ferris Wheel	Based on Play School. The attraction originally opened in 2015 at ABC Kids World and was relocated to Kenny and Belinda's Dreamland following the closure of the area. The attraction reopened on 9 December 2023 as part of the area's second phase of opening.	N/A

=== Former attractions ===
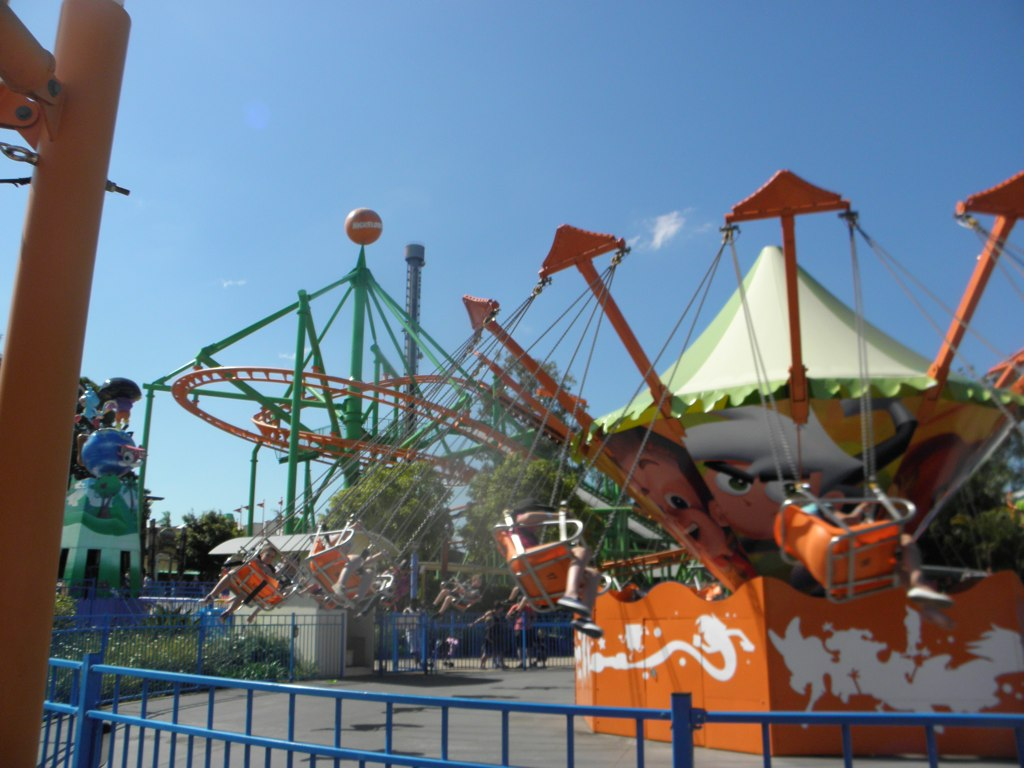
Soaring Swing (pictured as Swinger Zinger) in 2010.

Name	Opened	Closed	Manufacturer	Type	Description	Former names
Soaring Swing	1982	2023	Chance Industries	Swinger	One of Dreamworld's opening day attractions, and located in the Country Fair area (now Ocean Parade). In 2002, the ride was relocated to the new Nickelodeon Central area. The ride closed at the end of May 2023 and was dismantled shortly afterwards to make way for the Big Red Boat Coaster.	Zoomer (1982–2002); Swinger Zinger (2002–2012); Puss in Boots Sword Swing (2012–2022)

== Shows & Entertainment ==
=== Character Appearances ===
Throughout the day, guests have the opportunity to interact and have photos taken with Dreamworld's mascots Kenny Koala and Belinda Brown; as well as Shirley Shawn the Unicorn, Dorothy the Dinosaur, Wags the Dog, Henry the Octopus and Captain Feathersword from The Wiggles, and B1, B2 and Rat from Bananas in Pyjamas.

On special occasions, presenters from ABC Kids and Play School, alongside members of The Wiggles will make appearances in the area.

=== Shows ===
At various points of the day, there are several shows held at The Dreamworld Theatre such as:

- Dreamworld's Sock Hop Rock – a rock'n'roll themed show.
- Kenny & Belinda's Wipeout Show – a summer-themed show featuring the park's mascots, Kenny Koala and Belinda Brown.
- Wiggly Friends Show – A show featuring Dorothy the Dinosaur, Wags the Dog, Henry the Octopus and Captain Feathersword.

== Facilities ==
=== Dreamworld Parents Centre ===
The Dreamworld Parents Centre is a parents centre featuring private feeding spaces, kids play areas, reading nooks, microwaves, bottle sanitisers and changing spaces. The centre opened in December 2022, marking the first addition to Kenny and Belinda's Dreamland.

== See also ==
- DreamWorks Experience
- Kennyland
