= Cliffhanger (ride) =

Amusement park ride

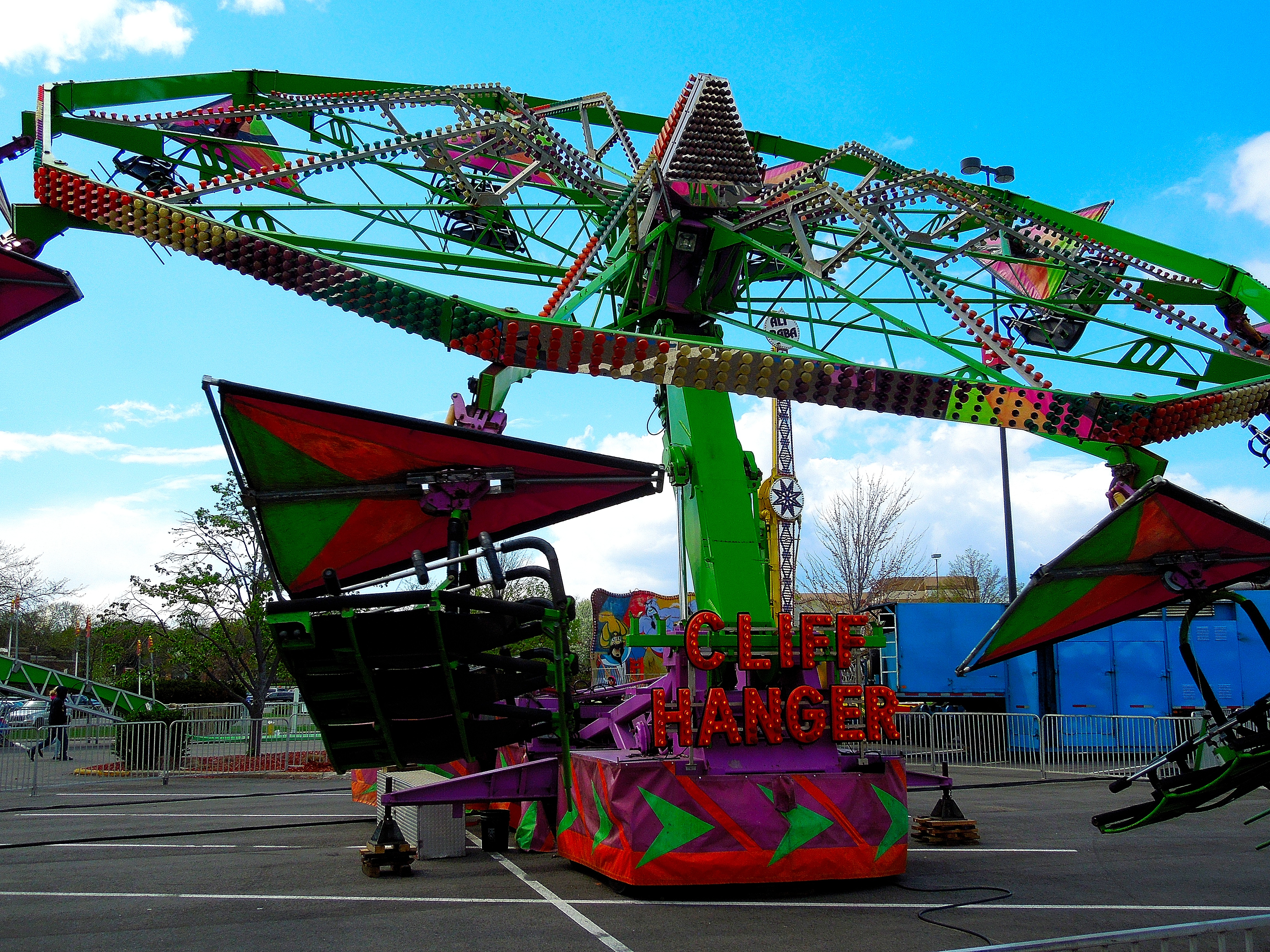

The Cliff Hanger is an amusement park ride that is meant to simulate hang gliding.

== Design ==
This ride consists of a steel boom with a hinged end. Attached to the boom are hydraulic cylinder rams that push the boom upward about 75 degrees off a base trailer with supporting outriggers, or concrete set in. Attached to the opposite end of the boom the hitch is on, is an avon bearing in which a circular collar is fixed. The collar has sweeps attached via bushings, sweeps primarily consist of foldable triangular truss structures.

The gondola cars for the ride are themed around kite tops. They are designed to hold 3 people in a laid position, with 30 passengers per load able to ride if call cars are full.

In the center most models of these rides have a pyramid style center ornament with lights. This ride also has a very strong light package set, running along the perimeter of the sweep to sweep cams. The ride most commonly uses kites, flags and banners in its operating structure to hide its skeletal lurking beams. The rides paint usually consists of neon, or bold colors. The overall design of the ride is similar to the Star Trooper ride, also manufactured by Dartron.

== Ride experience ==
The ride starts off by the boom lifting a few feet of the ground then starts to spin at a 65 degree tilt, sending passengers flying 50 feet in the air.

The ride Paratrooper is similar, but riders sit up instead of lying down.

== Operation ==
This ride is built with two operating modes, manual or automatic. Most carnivals like to use the automatic mode, for it is easier on the ride as well as its operator. The manual mode can be used if someone needs to get off, or to shorten the ride for any reason. Most controls of these rides are fixed with a foot pedal that will deactivate controls in absence of operator.

== Safety features ==
- Overhead body harnesses.
- Emergency power cut-off.
- Activate/Deactivate controls foot pedal. Safety use only.
- Anti-Swing gondola brakes.
