= History of Dreamworld =

Possibly the original Dreamworld logo with a generic log ride hut, paddle steamer, single loop coaster, main entrance building, wooden style coaster and train pictured. Some of the attractions depicted in this logo never existed at the park.

The history of Dreamworld dates back to the mid-1970s when John Longhurst envisioned the future theme park. After a seven-year construction period, Dreamworld officially opened to the public on 15 December 1981. Now owned by publicly listed Ardent Leisure, the park has seen many expansions, closures and replacements over the years.

Dreamworld's most iconic attraction is the Dreamworld Tower which stands 119 metres (390 ft) high. The tower houses The Giant Drop (once the world's tallest and fastest drop tower) and once housed the Tower of Terror II (once the world's tallest and fastest roller coaster). Other thrill rides at the park include The Claw, The Gold Coaster, Mick Doohan's Motocoaster, Serpent Slayer and Tail Spin. The park also features a children's area based upon ABC Kids shows. A wide collection of flat rides rounds out the attraction lineup.

Throughout 2011, Dreamworld celebrated its 30th birthday by investing money in a variety of attractions over the course of the year.

== Design and construction ==
In 1968, entrepreneur John Longhurst took his children to a zoo in Sydney and subsequently felt he could develop something better. After reading a newspaper article describing Disneyland as "a real Dream World", Longhurst registered the name Dreamworld as a trademark on 10 May 1973. One year later, he purchased 85 hectares (210 acres) of land beside the Pacific Motorway in Coomera. Over a 7-year period, 40 acres (16 ha) of this land was developed to form the Dreamworld theme park.

Longhurst also had a hand in constructing the park. He personally spent 12 hours a day, every day for two-and-a-half years to excavate and develop the Murrissipi River in the centre of the park. The 800-metre (2,600 ft) channel is 30 metres (98 ft) wide and up to 3 metres (9.8 ft) deep. A paddle steamer, named the Captain Sturt Paddlewheeler, was later added to the river prior to the opening of the park.

Building design
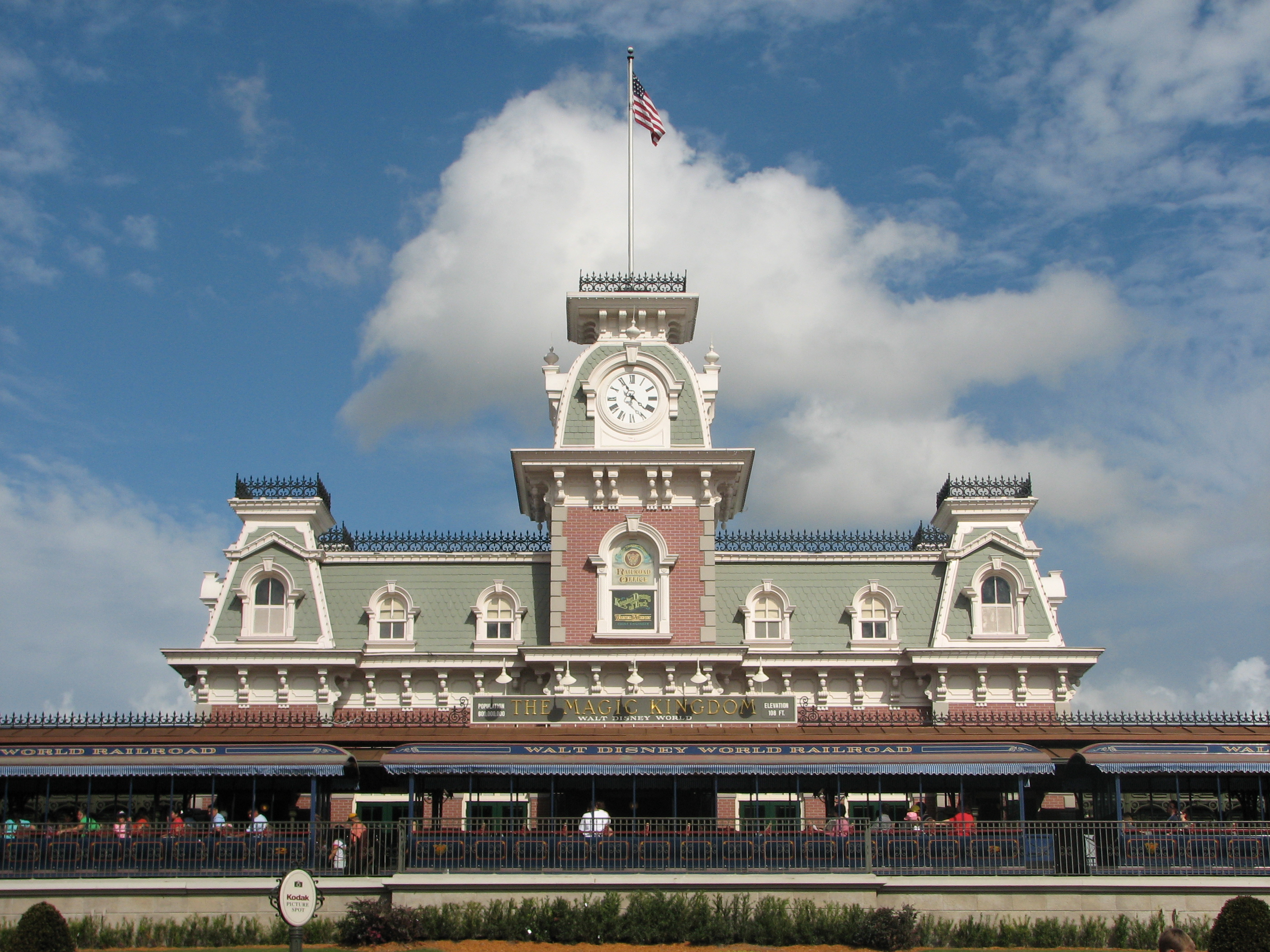
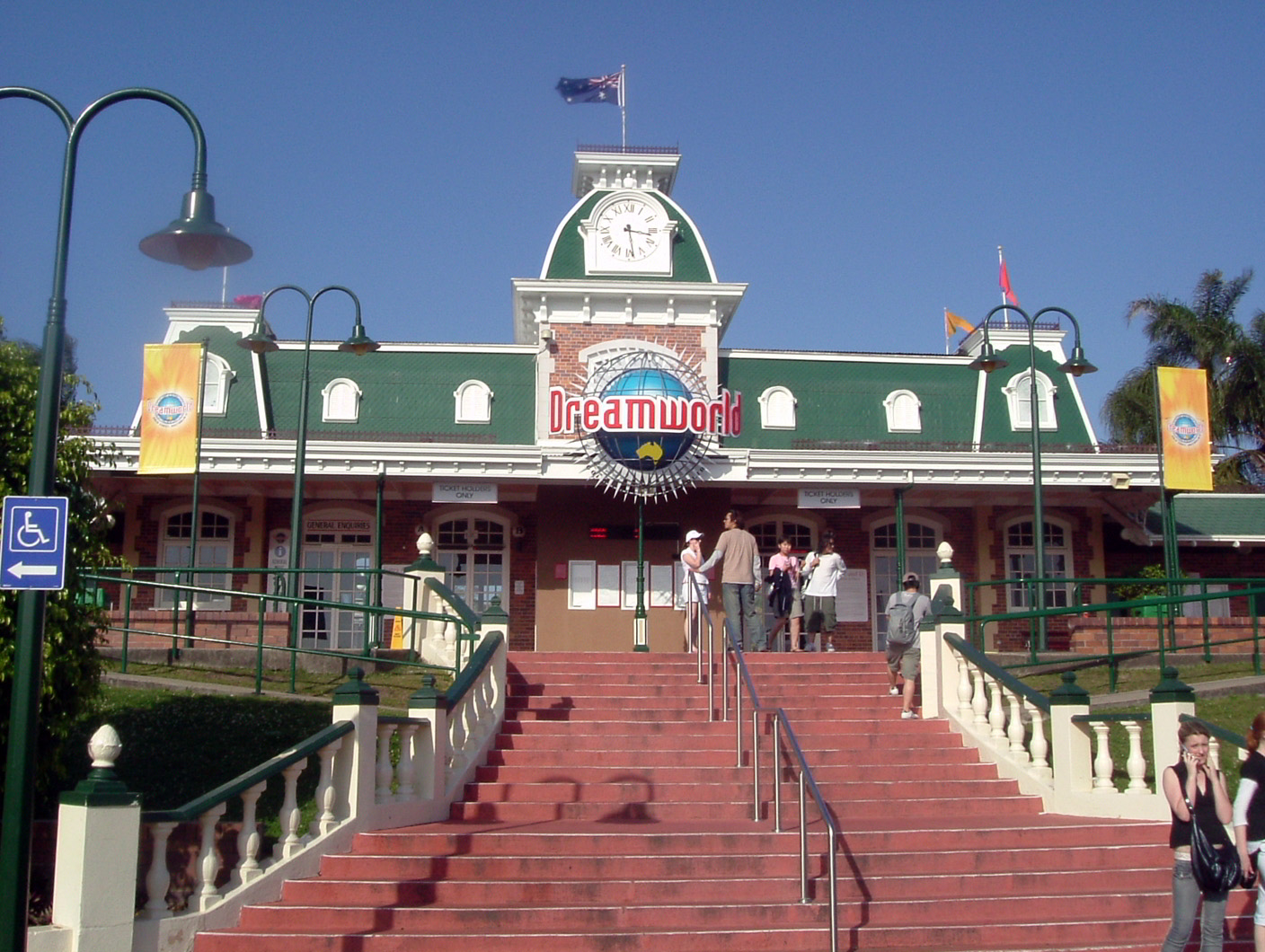
A comparison of the building design of the Magic Kingdom's Main Street U.S.A Train Station (left) and Dreamworld's City Hall building (entrance)

In the late 1970s, Longhurst was joined by Sydney furniture salesman Ken Lord. The additional funding provided by Lord allowed Longhurst to embrace his peer-described characteristic of being a perfectionist. This characteristic was on display when he employed some of the designers responsible for Disneyland and Walt Disney World. These architects were responsible for such buildings as the City Hall (entrance building) and IMAX Theatre which closely resemble the Walt Disney World Railroad's station in Main Street U.S.A. and the Emporium at the Magic Kingdom, respectively. A collection of Australian architects had the task to design further buildings which mimicked Australian pioneer buildings.

Longhurst had previously experienced the film To Fly! in an IMAX theatre and wanted to bring that concept to the park. To cater for the 7-storey tall screen, 3 storeys were excavated to allow the screen to fit within a 4-storey building. Seating for 426 people and a $60,000 sound system completed Dreamworld's IMAX Theatre.

A steam-powered railway was the third attraction Longhurst envisaged for the park. A locomotive from Baldwin Locomotive Works was purchased and 3,000 metres (9,800 ft) of track was laid to develop the Cannonball Express. The train was originally used during the First World War in France before being relocated to Queensland for use on the cane fields. At the time of its opening, the Cannonball Express was the Longest privately owned railway in Australia. Although the ride's name has been changed to the Dreamworld Railway, it retains this record to this day.

Fourteen replicas of 1911 Model T Fords were purchased at a cost of $12,000 each to develop the Model T Fords attraction. The ride saw guests drive their own car along a rail-guided figure-8 track. The ride still exists to this day (albeit at a different location) under the name Avis Vintage Cars. The Gilltraps Auto Museum was relocated to Dreamworld to showcase the workings of vintage cars as well as the restoration process of vintage cars.

To further diversify the park's offerings a log flume was constructed. The Rocky Hollow Log Ride would see up to four guests board a fibreglass boat and navigate a 500-metre (1,600 ft) flume culminating in a drop at the finish.

Longhurst felt this collection of attractions would satisfy all age groups.

== Opening ==
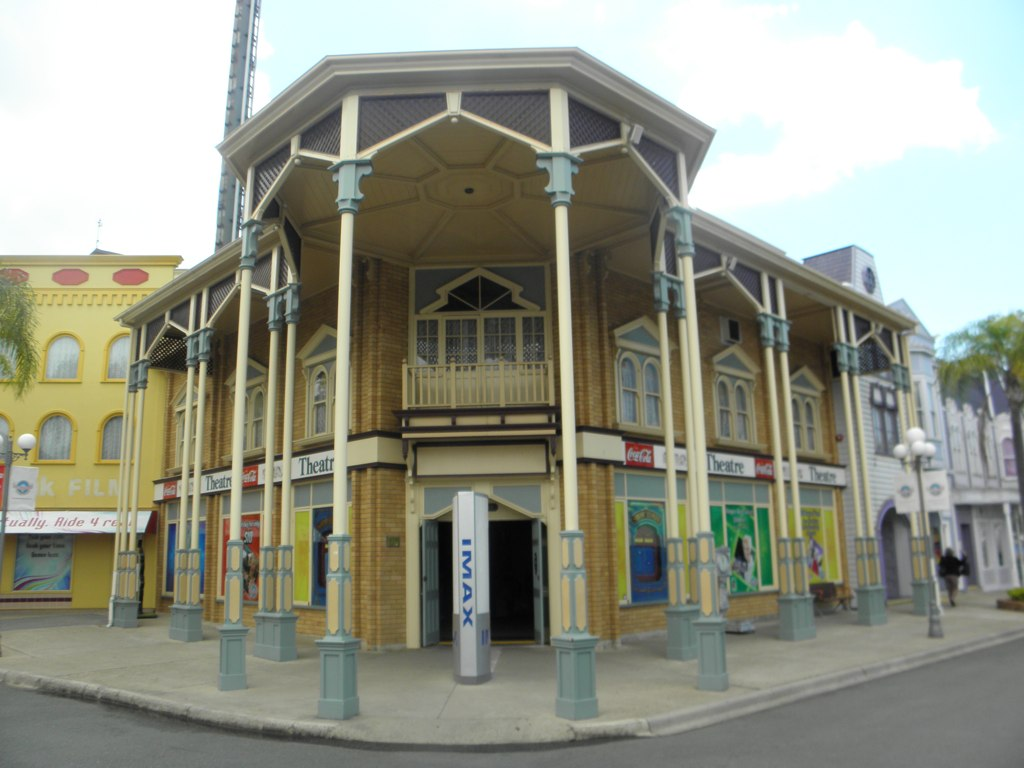
The IMAX Theatre in 2010

Dreamworld was officially opened on 15 December 1981 by the Premier of Queensland of the time, Sir Joh Bjelke-Petersen along with park mascot Kenny Koala. At the time, the park employed a total of 220 employees and operated from 10am – 5pm, Tuesday to Thursday. Dreamworld was described as "Australia's answer to Disneyland" by the media – a title supported by the park due to its focus on quality. It was notable at the time for being one of the very few attractions on the Gold Coast where a single admission fee covered unlimited turns on all of the rides and attractions. This admission fee was $11.50 for an adult and $7.50 for a child. The park welcomed 450 guests on its first day of operation. Within the first four months of operation, Dreamworld attracted 250,000 guests and was predicted to be the biggest tourist attraction in the Southern Hemisphere by the mid-1980s.

== 1980s ==
In the months following Dreamworld's opening the park set about constructing more rides, shows and attractions. In April 1982, Dreamworld opened a new themed area titled Country Fair. The flagship attraction was the Thunderbolt roller coaster. This steel roller coaster was designed by Japanese firm Sanoyas Hishino Meisho and was Australia's first looping roller coaster. At the time of opening it also earned the title of Australia's longest roller coaster with a length of 1,207 metres (3,960 ft). Other attractions in the area included a swing ride named Zumer (later Swinger Zinger) and a plane ride named Red Baron (later Dora the Explorer's Sea Planes). A set of upcharge go-karts named Grand Prix were located within the Thunderbolt's footprint rounded out the attractions in Country Fair. Also in 1982, a second themed area opened known as Gum Tree Gully. The area's main attraction was the Australian Koala Theatre which showed the animatronic show Koala Country Jamboree at the time.

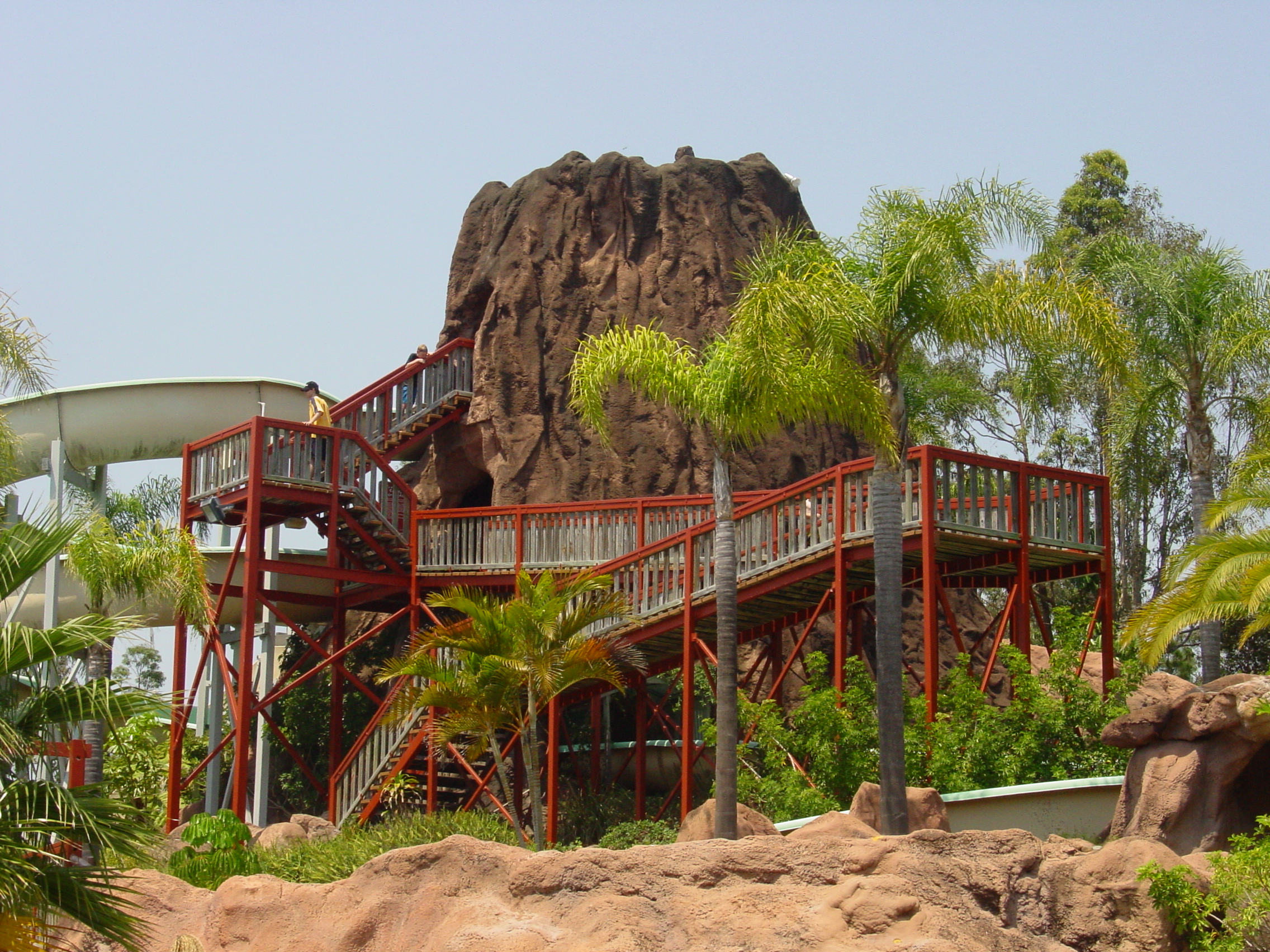
Blue Lagoon water park in 2002

In 1983, the park expanded again adding another two new themed areas. The first was the Blue Lagoon water park. Attractions at Blue Lagoon included a body slide named Aqualoop Flume Ride, a tube ride named Krakatoa's Revenge, and a toboggan ride named Toboggan Ride. A large lagoon swimming pool and a children's pool rounded out the water park. The second themed area was Village Green which was constructed to provide a link between the 1982 additions of Country Fair and Gum Tree Gully. Attractions at Village Green included a matterhorn ride named Avalanche, a set of Bertazzon bumper cars, a carousel, an arcade and a miniature train ride named Little Puff which ventured through an area known as The Enchanted Forest. Country Fair was also expanded with the addition of the Enterprise (later Reef Diver) and a Chance Rides Trabant named Roulette (later Stingray). The park also introduced its third mascot, Belinda Brown.

In 1984, Dreamworld began seven-day trading after only being open Tuesday through to Thursday since 1981.

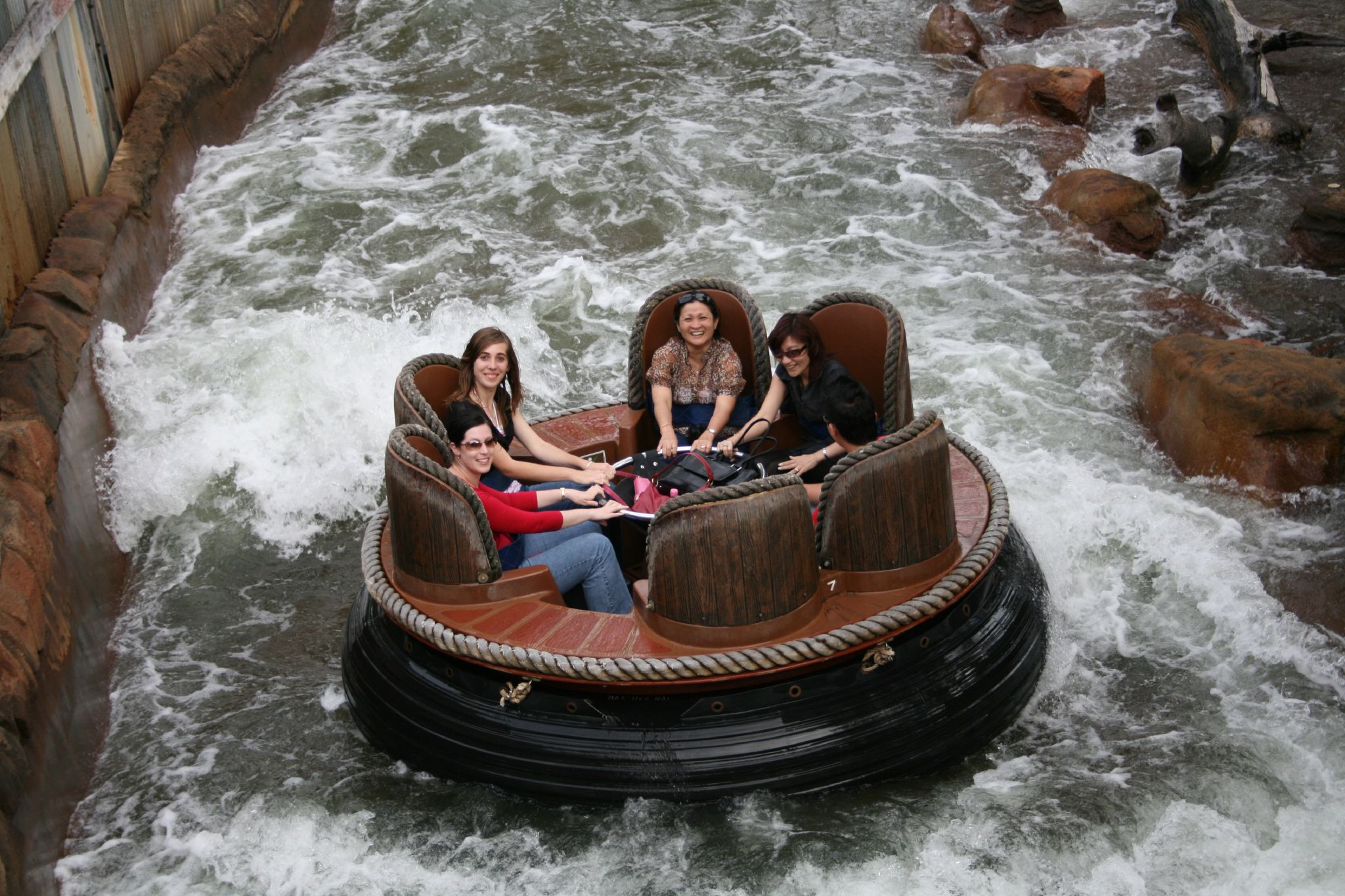
Thunder River Rapids Ride in 2007

On 15 December 1986, Dreamworld unveiled Gold Rush Country (later the Town of Gold Rush), its eighth themed area. The area was located to the left of Central Plaza and featured two attractions. The first was a wild mouse roller coaster named the Eureka Mountain Mine Ride. Built by Brisbane company HyFab, the roller coaster was enclosed within a mountain with selected track segments venturing outside the mountain. The area's second attraction was a river rafting ride called Thunder River Rapids Ride. The ride's channel weaved around Gold Rush Country and under the Eureka Mountain Mine Ride. Also in 1986, the park opened the Music Bowl (later Dreamworld Amphitheatre and Dreamworld Studios) and had its first after-dark opening.

In 1987, Koala Country opened as the park's ninth themed area. Spanning 6 hectares (15 acres), the area was home to many native animals including 13 koalas. Two years later the Skylink Chairlift opened providing a link between Koala Country and Gold Rush Country. The 312-metre (1,024 ft) ride was manufactured by Ferrari and saw pairs of guests board one of 38 carriages for a three-and-a-half minute ride. The ride was originally located at Magic Mountain, Nobby Beach before being relocated to the park.

== 1990s ==
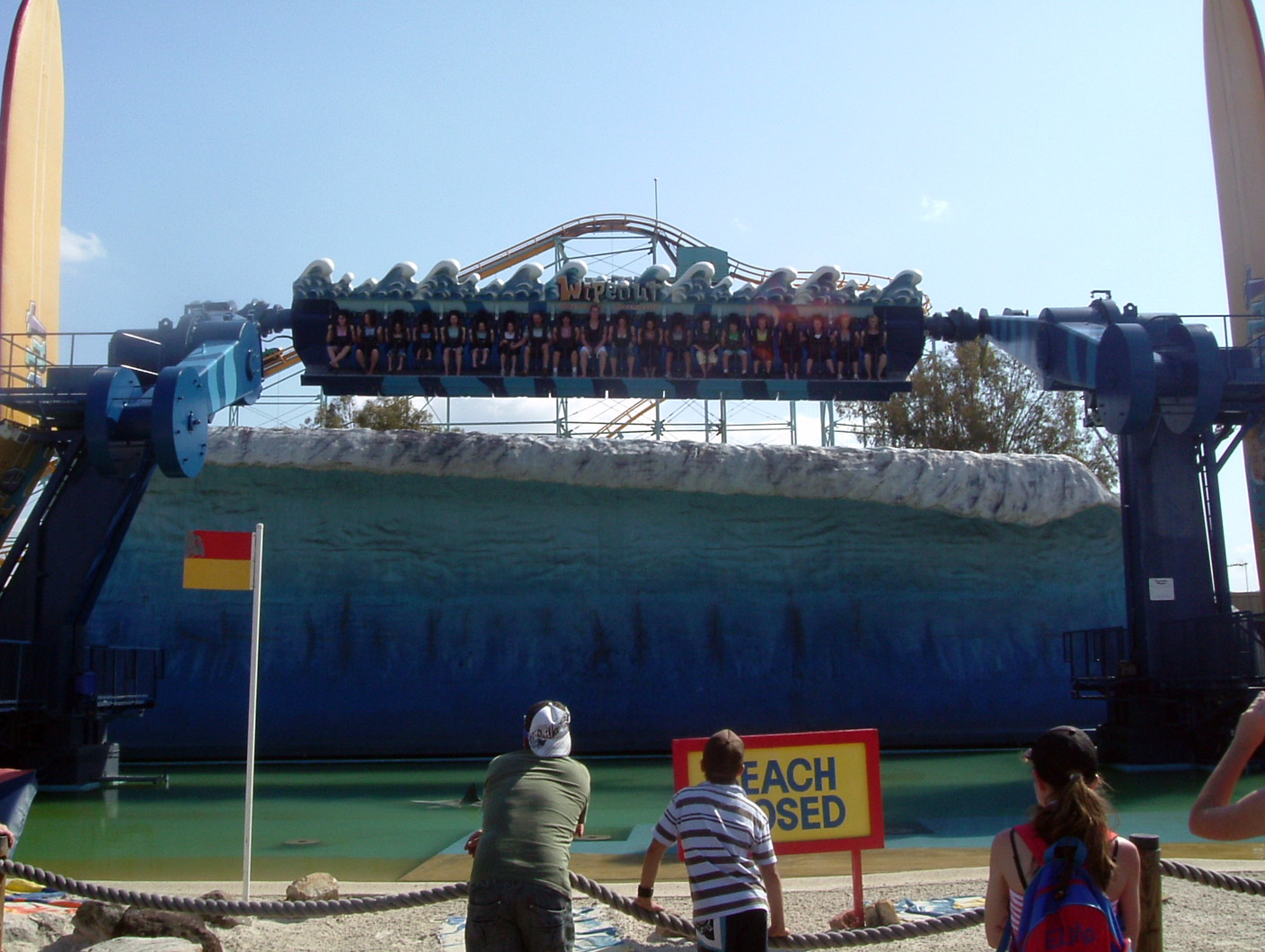
The Wipeout in 2006

On 26 December 1993, Dreamworld opened its tenth themed area, Ocean Parade. The area took over the northern portion of the existing Country Fair themed area. Ocean Parade's flagship attraction was the $6 million Wipeout. The ride was the world's first Vekoma Wakiki Wave Super Flip – a ride similar to a traditional Top Spin. The Roulette was rethemed to become the Stingray and relocated to a new location at the same time.

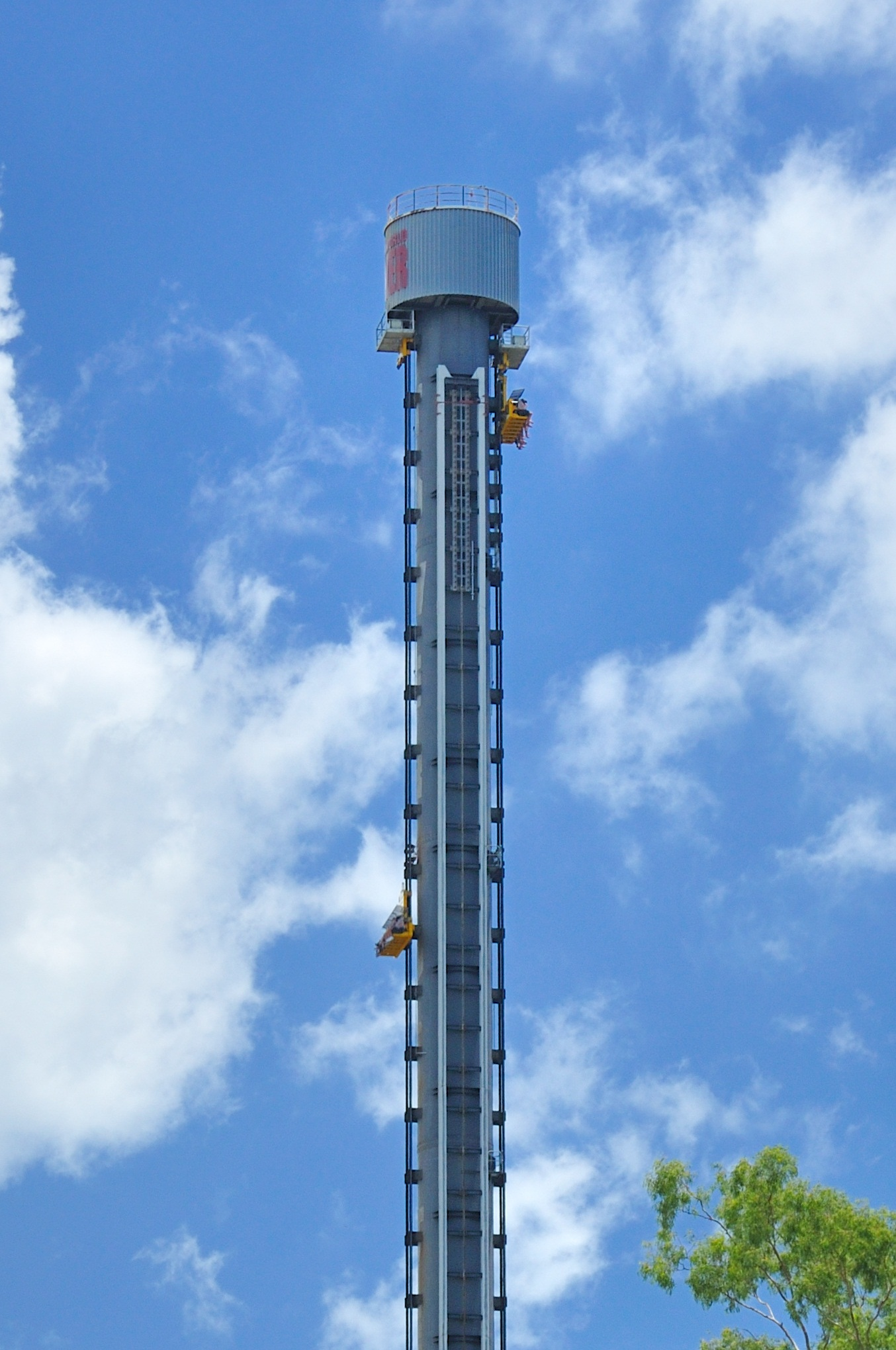
The Dreamworld Tower which houses the Giant Drop and Tower of Terror II in 2011

In June 1995, Dreamworld opened Tiger Island where Bengal and white tigers interact with keepers in the same exhibit. At the same time they also constructed a path to connect Gum Tree Gully with Koala Country. Along this path they opened the Riverwalk Restaurant (later renamed Billabong BBQ and Buffet).

In the mid-1990s, Dreamworld entered into an agreement with Swiss amusement ride manufacturer Intamin to construct the 119-metre (390 ft)-high Dreamworld Tower at a cost of over $1 million. On 23 January 1997, the world's tallest and fastest roller coaster opened on the tower. Known as the Tower of Terror, the ride launches guests from 0 to 160.9 kilometres per hour (100.0 mph) in 7 seconds along the flat before travelling 100 metres (330 ft) vertically up the tower. The car then returns the way it came. The Tower of Terror was the first ride of its type and is currently one of only two in the world (the other Reverse Freefall Coaster being Superman: Escape from Krypton at Six Flags Magic Mountain). Construction of the tower required the rerouting of the Avis Vintage Cars track around the tower.

Later in 1997, Dreamworld manufactured and opened the Creature Cruise. The ride was a free flow boat ride located in the northern portion of Village Oval. It would take riders on a gentle cruise past 140 handcrafted animals, birds and marine life in their respective habitats. In 1998, four Bengal Tiger cubs (Rama, Taj, Sultan and Sita) and several pure bred dingoes were born.

On 26 December 1998, a second ride was constructed on the Dreamworld Tower. Similar to the Tower of Terror, The Giant Drop was designed by Intamin. At a cost of $12 million, it opened as the world's tallest and fastest freefall ride.

In December 1999, Dreamworld added a variety of kids rides in a new themed area called Kennyland. The area took over the northern portion of Village Oval. It consisted of a selection of rides and attractions including Wild Wheels (SBF Visa Group Convoy), Dream Copters (SBF Visa Group Jets), Adventure Trails (jumping castle) and Kenny's Cars (SBF Visa Group Mini Bumper Cars). Around the same time, the Creature Cruise was converted from a boat ride into a walkthrough attraction.

== 2000s ==
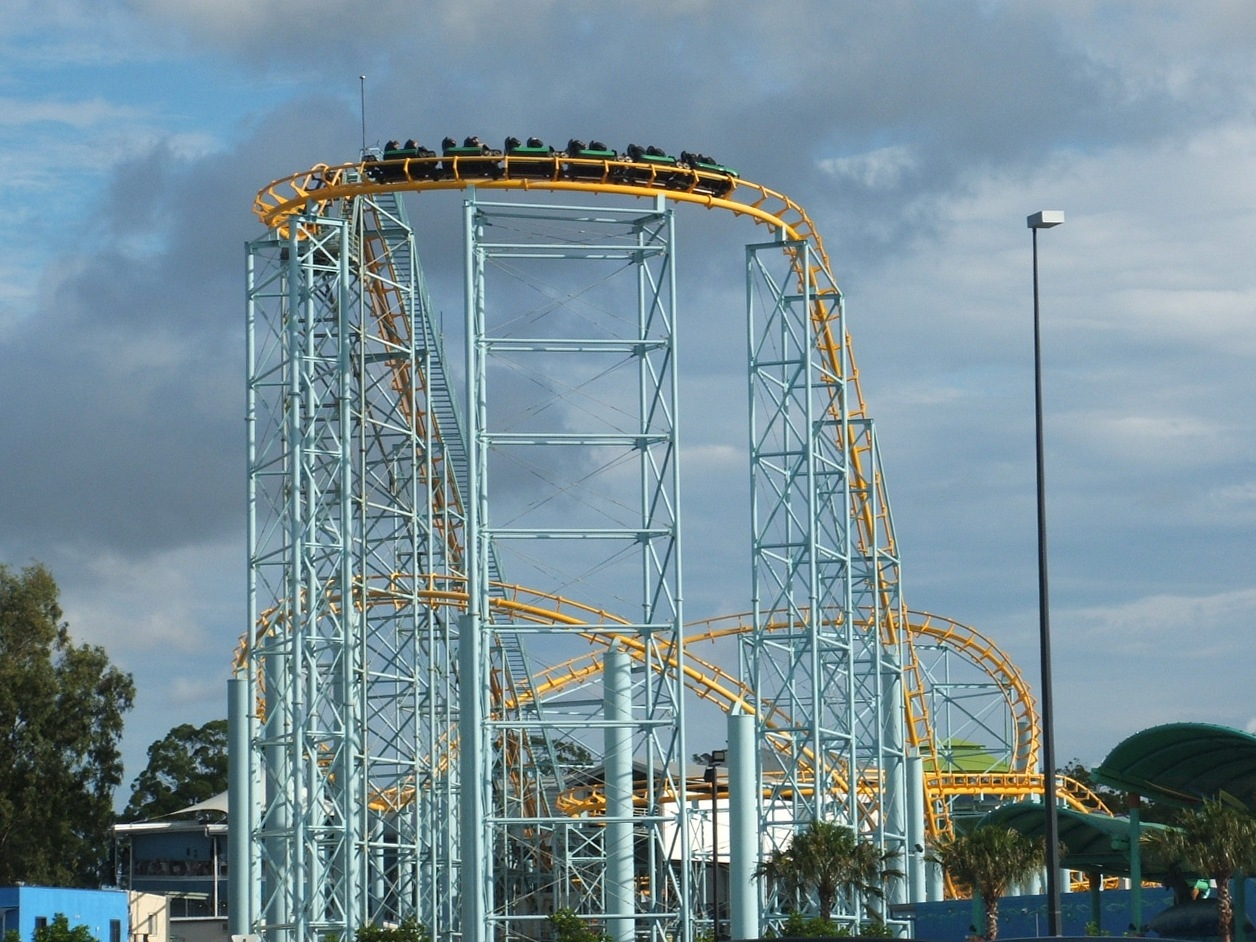
The Cyclone roller coaster which was installed in 2001.

In January 2001, the Australian Wildlife Experience opened after the multimillion-dollar refurbishment and expansion of Koala Country to feature new areas based upon wetlands, woodlands, rainforest and arid desert. In April 2001, Big Brother Australia commenced broadcasting following the redevelopment of Dreamworld's Amphitheatre. On 23 June 2001, a temporary scare attraction called The Mummy Returns began operation. The attraction was the first of many of scare attractions to be created by Sudden Impact! Entertainment Company for Dreamworld. It closed on 8 July 2001. Also in 2001, two new Bengal tigers, Kato and Kaasha, were born in Tiger Island.

On 21 October 2001, Dreamworld announced that they would be adding the $5 million Cyclone roller coaster. On 26 December 2001, the Cyclone officially opened to the public. The ride was the former Big Dipper roller coaster at Luna Park Sydney. Designed by Arrow Dynamics, the Cyclone was a sit down custom looping roller coaster featuring 2 inversions.

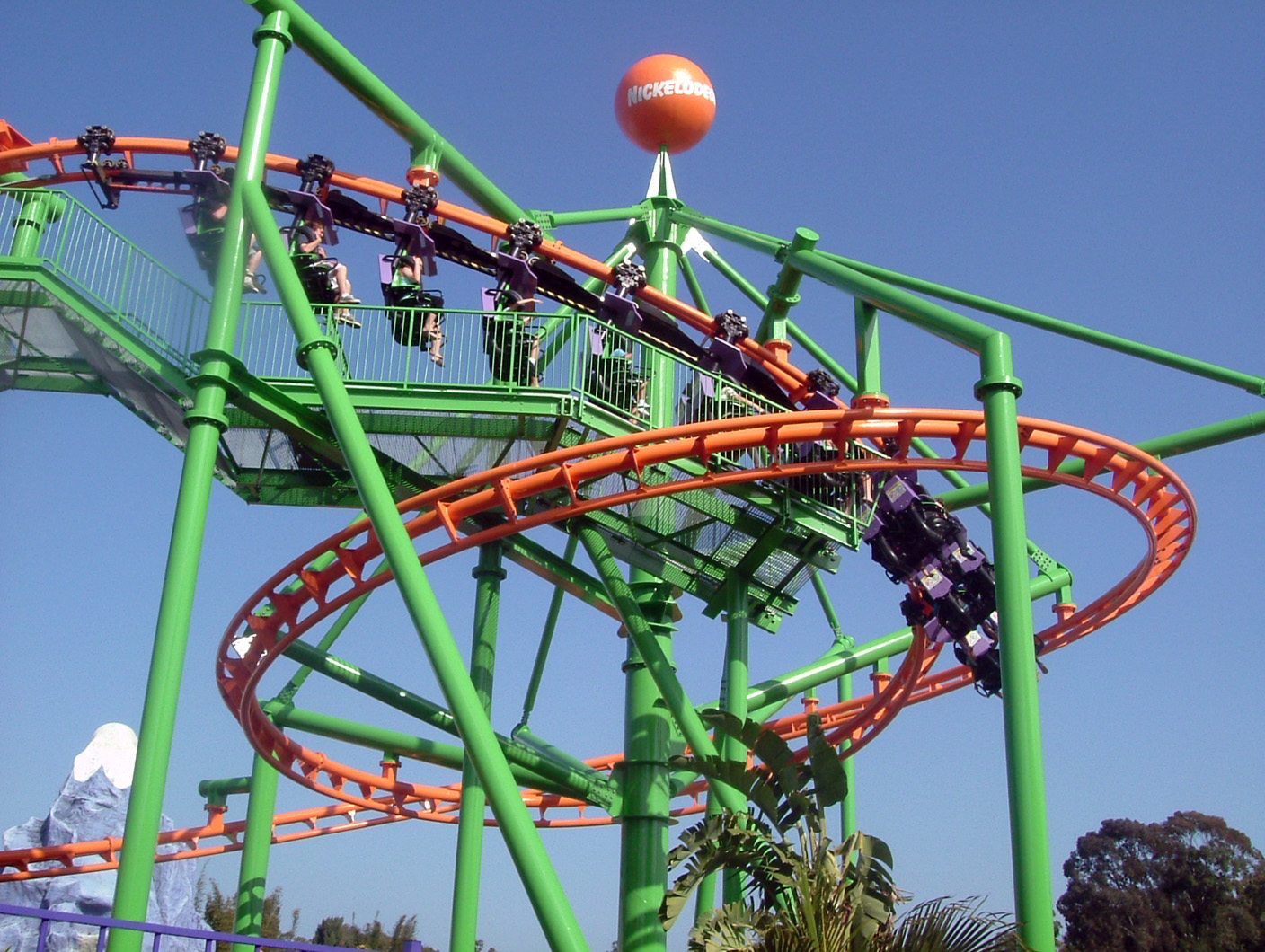
Rugrats Runaway Reptar in 2006

In the first half of 2002, the entrance to the Tower of Terror was relocated to the opposite side of the track. This was followed by the closure of the Central Cafe, Kennyland and part of Village Oval. Shortly after, a temporary children's area opened in Gum Tree Gully. Known as the Kid's Carnival, the area featured several of the rides from Kennyland including the Dream Copters, Kenny Karts and Adventure Trails. A children's ferris wheel was also included in the lineup. In August 2002, it was announced that Dreamworld would be adding Nickelodeon Central, however, specific details at the time were sparse. After investing $7 million Dreamworld officially opened Nickelodeon Central on 26 December 2002. New attractions included Rugrats Runaway Reptar roller coaster, Wild Thornberry's Rainforest Rampage and the Slime Bowl. The Zumer from the Country Fair themed area was relocated to Nickelodeon Central and rethemed to Swinger Zinger. Kennyland's Dream Copters ride was relocated and resumed operation under the same name and theme. The existing Carousel, Bumper Bowl and Avalanche were renamed to Nick-O-Round, Rocket Power Bumper Beach and Angry Beavers Spooty Spin, respectively.

In 2003, Dreamworld further expanded its wildlife offerings by running the after hours, upcharge attraction Sunset Safari where guests are taken on a tour behind the scenes of Dreamworld's wildlife attractions. In August 2003, the Thunderbolt was closed. Dreamworld sought but failed to find a buyer for the ride, and Thunderbolt was demolished and sold for scrap metal in March 2004. Dreamworld has retained a section of track and at least one train in the park's back-of-house areas. At around the same time, the Dream Copters ride in Nickelodeon Central was rethemed to become Blues Skidoo. The retheme saw new dog-shaped vehicles added to the ride in place of the planes and helicopters it originally featured. A temporary scare attraction known as Lara Croft Tomb Raider – Enter the Tomb operated from 23 December 2003 until 18 April 2004.

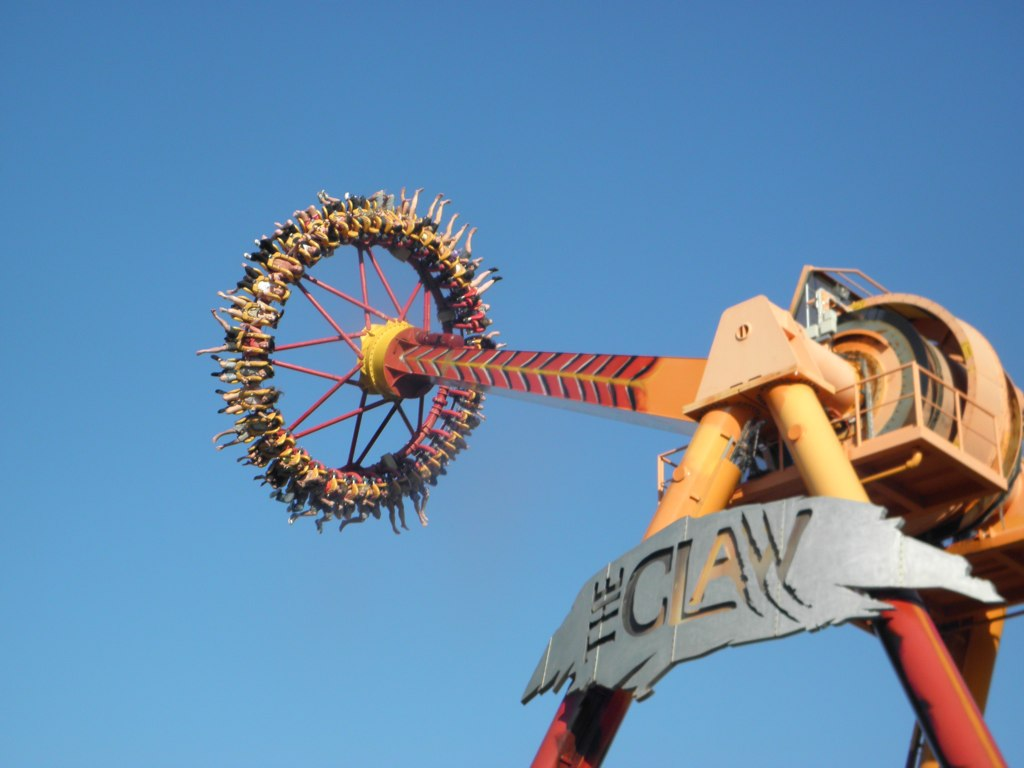
The Claw in 2010

In April 2004, construction began on what was rumoured to be a Teen Market Thrill Ride to open later in the year. To aid in the construction, the northern end of Ocean Parade was closed off to the public forcing guests to detour through Nickelodeon Central to get to the other rides that area, including the Cyclone and the Wipeout. In July 2004, Dreamworld announced that the ride was going to be an Intamin Gyro Swing, a duplicate of Maelstrom at Drayton Manor in the United Kingdom. On 18 September 2004, The Claw officially opened to the public.

On 15 March 2005, the Skylink Chairlift, which provided a link between Gold Rush Country and the Australian Wildlife Experience, closed. It remained standing for several months before the wires were removed. The support poles remain standing to this day. In July 2005, Gum Tree Gully closed to make way for Wiggles World. The world's first Wiggles World officially opened on 17 September 2005 with the Big Red Car Ride, Captain Feathersword's Ship and the Fun Spot.

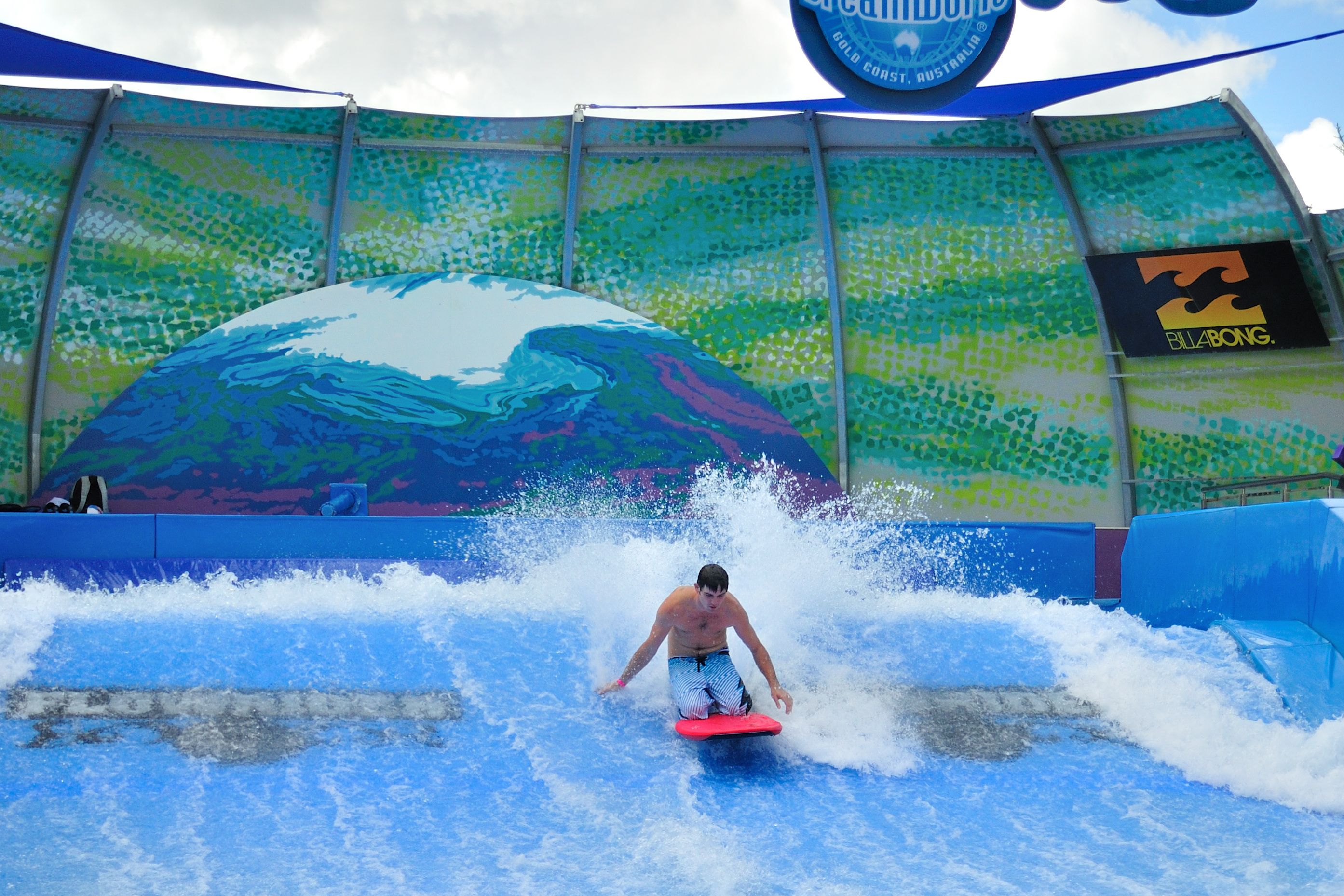
FlowRider in 2010

In November 2005, the owners of Dreamworld announced that they would be investing $56 million in a separate water park located next to Dreamworld. The then-unnamed water park was scheduled to open in December 2006. In April 2006, Dreamworld's internal Blue Lagoon was closed. At around the same time, Dreamworld began constructing a Wave Loch FlowRider on Ocean Parade. It was constructed on part of the site of the former Thunderbolt roller coaster which was removed in 2004. On 23 June 2006, the attraction had its soft opening which was attended by the attraction's designer Tom Lochtefeld as well as several surfers, snowboarders, wakeboarders and skateboarders. The following day, the FlowRider officially opened to the public. On 7 November 2006, the Eureka Mountain Mine Ride closed and has remained standing but not operating to this day. On 8 December 2006, WhiteWater World opened as a separate gated complex as Blue Lagoon's replacement. On 26 December 2006, Nightmares, a temporary scary experience, featuring two different sections: The Freezer and Angoscia. It operated through to 7 July 2007.

In April 2007, two Sumatran Tiger cubs, Indah and Rahni, were born at Tiger Island. At around the same time, the Avis Vintage Cars were relocated from Rivertown to a new location in the Australian Wildlife Experience. In July 2007, it was announced that Dreamworld would be adding Mick Doohan's Motocoaster in time for the September school holidays. The ride would be a motorbike roller coaster manufactured by Intamin. On 30 September 2007, Mick Doohan's Motocoaster officially opened to the public.

On 9 June 2008, Tiger Island welcomed the birth of three Sumatran Tiger cubs: Ndari, Jaya and Shanti. On 20 June 2008, SpongeBob FlyPants, a Zamperla Kite Flyer opened as part of Nickelodeon Central. In the middle of 2008, the final series of Network Ten's Big Brother was produced leaving the house and studios standing empty upon completion. The Mummy: Tomb of the Dragon Emperor Live operated for a limited season between September 2008 and January 2009. It was a walkthrough scare attraction. In Ocean Parade, V8 Supercars RedLine opened on 26 December near the FlowRider and the Cyclone's entrance.

In February 2009, the Vortex was closed and removed to make way for AVPX which officially opened on 10 April 2009. AVPX is an indoor laser tag arena manufactured by Sudden Impact! Entertainment Company.

== 2010s ==
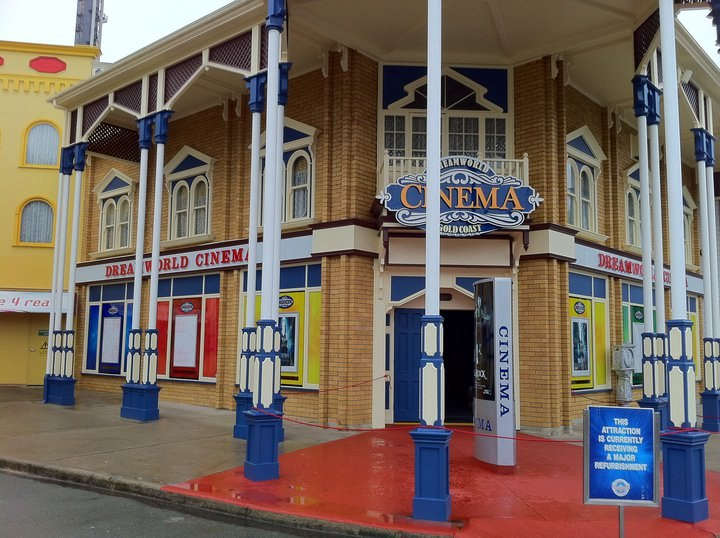
Dreamworld Cinema in the final stages of its renovation in late 2010.

On 2 April 2010, the Illuminate Light & Laser Spectacular began seasonal operation in Main Street. The attraction is a light and laser show created by Australian entertainment company, Laservision. On 17 September 2010, the Tower of Terror relaunched as the Tower of Terror II featuring a new, reversed car. In late 2010, Dreamworld announced that they would begin celebrating their 30th birthday by holding the Summer Funomenon over the summer school holidays. The IMAX Theatre was renovated to become the Dreamworld Cinema. A roof was constructed over Main Street between the entrances for Ocean Parade and Nickelodeon Central. The Marketplace in Main Street was also upgraded. Also a new tiger cub named Pi (pronounced pie) was transferred to the park from Cairns Wildlife Safari Reserve.

On 16 February 2011, Ardent Leisure announced plans to have an Easter promotion where lions would be on temporary exhibition from National Zoo & Aquarium who were renovating their facilities. In March 2011, Dreamworld officially announced that The Lair would be themed to the Timbavati region in South Africa. The interactive exhibit would feature a triple laminated glass panel which allowed guests to view the lions up close. They also announced The Lair would be used for other exotic animal species in the future. The exhibit currently houses additional tigers from Tiger Island.

On 7 April 2011, Dreamworld announced that they would be adding a family thrill ride in June and a major thrill ride in September 2011. On 18 May 2011, the family thrill ride was officially announced to be a Zamperla Disk'O called Shockwave within Ocean Parade. The ride opened on 25 June 2011.

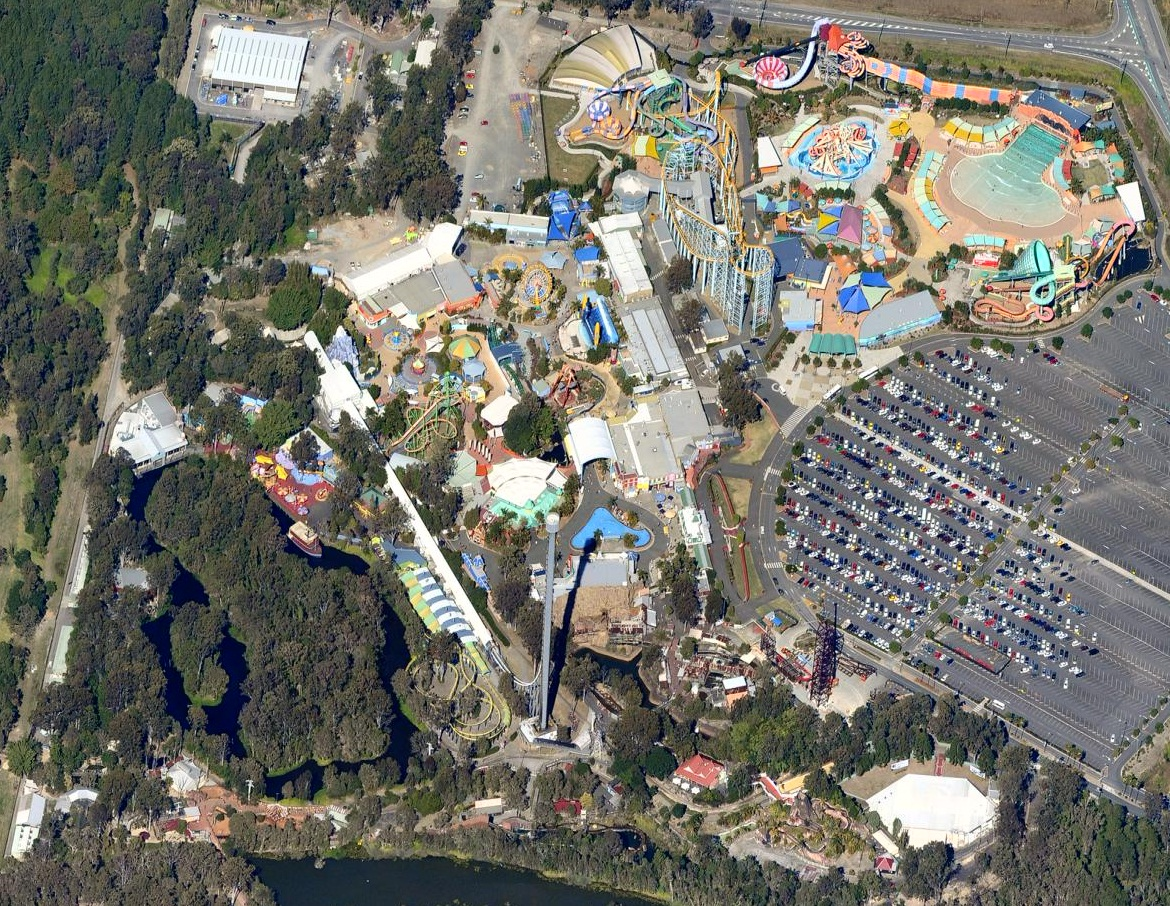
An aerial view of Dreamworld and WhiteWater World in July 2011.

Towards the middle of 2011, elements of Nickelodeon theming from Nickelodeon Central started to be removed leading to speculation that the contract with the television network was being terminated. By the start of the winter holidays on 25 June 2011, the area was renamed to a generic kids theme: Kid's World. Some rides were rethemed at this time: Angry Beavers Spooty Spin reverted back to its original name as Avalanche, The Backyardigans Mighty-Go-Round, Rocket Power Bumper Beach and the Wild Thornberrys' Rainforest Rampage dropped their top names, SpongeBob FlyPants, the Slime Bowl and Rugrats Runaway Reptar were rethemed as Kite Flyer, the Dreambowl and Sky Rocket respectively, and the Swinger Zinger was repainted.

On 17 September 2011, Dreamworld opened BuzzSaw – a Maurer Söhne SkyLoop roller coaster. The opening of the ride was timed with the renaming of Gold Rush Country to the Town of Gold Rush.

On 10 November 2011, Dreamworld announced a three-stage plan to incorporate DreamWorks Animation films and characters into its theme park. The three phases were expected to cost $10 million to complete. On 19 December 2011, Dreamworld opened the DreamWorks Holiday Shrektacular Show which featured 8 DreamWorks Animation characters live on stage. This was the first of a three-phase plan to incorporate the characters into the theme park. The show concluded on 27 January 2012. On 1 February 2012, following the peak season, Dreamworld closed most of the rides in Kid's World. The 8,400-square-metre (90,000 sq ft) area was rethemed into the DreamWorks Experience precinct over a period of two months. This phase was officially opened to the public on 31 March 2012, and Mighty-Go-Round was rethemed as Shrek's Ogre-Go-Round, Swinger Zinger was rethemed as Puss in Boots Sword Swing, Blue's Skidoo was rethemed as Dronkey Flyers, and Kite Flyer was rethemed as Gingy's Glider as part of Shrek's Faire Faire Away, and Sky Rocket was rethemed as Escape from Madagascar, the Dreambowl was rethemed as King Julien's Theatre in the Wild, and Rainforest Rampage was rethemed as MAD Jungle Jam as part of Madagascar Madness.

On 9 July 2012 at Dreamworld, the Australian Minister for Tourism Martin Ferguson announced that the Australian Government would contribute $1.1 million to the redevelopment of the Australian Wildlife Experience into an Indigenous tourist experience. Dreamworld's owners, Ardent Leisure, vowed to match the grant in order to have the $2.2 million redeveloped area open by late 2013. Dreamworld have previously worked with the Indigenous community to develop the Dreamworld Dreamtime show in 2010 and 2011.

The Dreamworld Wildlife Foundation (DWF) works with wildlife groups and brings financial support to conservation of wildlife on a global scale. DWF, founded in March 2012 is international and non-governmental. DWF is based out of Dreamworld amusement and houses some native species at the park such as Koalas, Dingos and Tigers. These animals are available for encounters and picture to be taken with them. These services are available to this day (as of September, 2022.)

On 15 July 2012, Dreamworld closed the Avalanche in order for construction to continue on the final development phase of the DreamWorks Animation alliance, Kung Fu Panda: Land of Awesomeness. The new area included a new set of bumper cars, Skadoosh, as well as Dreamworld's eighth thrill ride, Pandamonium, and the Kung Fu Academy.

AVPX closed on 31 March 2013. It was replaced with Zombie Evilution on 13 September 2013. Zombie Evilution originally ran as a temporary scare maze until 14 October. On 18 October, the attraction reopened as a laser skirmish attraction with the same theme and backstory.

On 8 November 2013 the park was evacuated when a bushfire came within close proximity. Everyone in the park was evacuated within an hour. Dreamworld announced via Facebook that the park was not under any immediate threat and that back burning to protect it from any damage had started just outside the Big Brother complex. Later that day, Dreamworld again announced via Facebook that the blaze was under control thanks to firefighters and that the park would re-open as normal the next day.

On 28 April 2014, the Reef Diver closed and was subsequently removed. On 20 September, it was replaced by Tail Spin, a Gerstlauer Sky Fly.

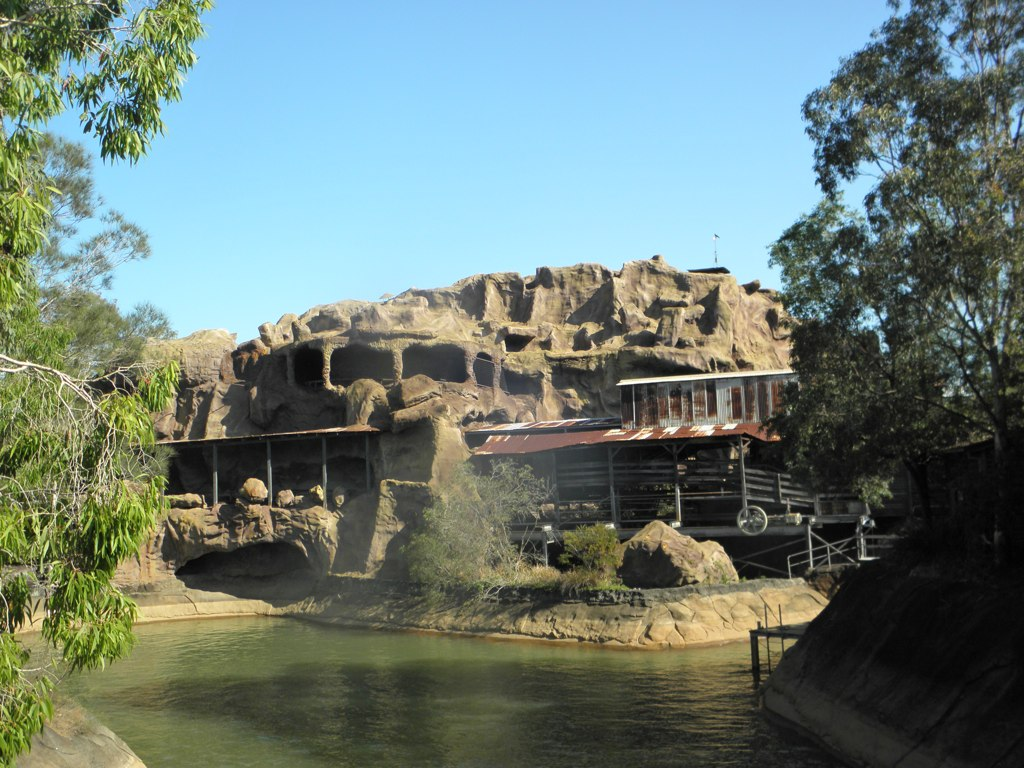
Eureka Mountain Mine Ride was rumoured to be reopened

In early 2015, Dreamworld teased that two new big attractions would be coming to the park in 2015. Throughout the early months of the year, rumours circulated as to the reopening of the Eureka Mountain Mine Ride, however these did not eventuate. Zombie Evilution once again reopened as a scare maze in April. On 12 May, Dreamworld announced that Wiggles World would become a shared kids' world based on the characters of the Australian children's television network, ABC Kids. ABC Kids World opened in June. Dreamworld also revealed plans for an extensive motorsport attraction, which was expected to be a new V8 Supercars attraction to either complement or replace V8 Supercars RedLine. On 26 July, Tiger Cub Kai was born. On 12 October, The Cyclone was closed for refurbishment as part of the Motorsport Precinct, labelled to open 26 December 2015.

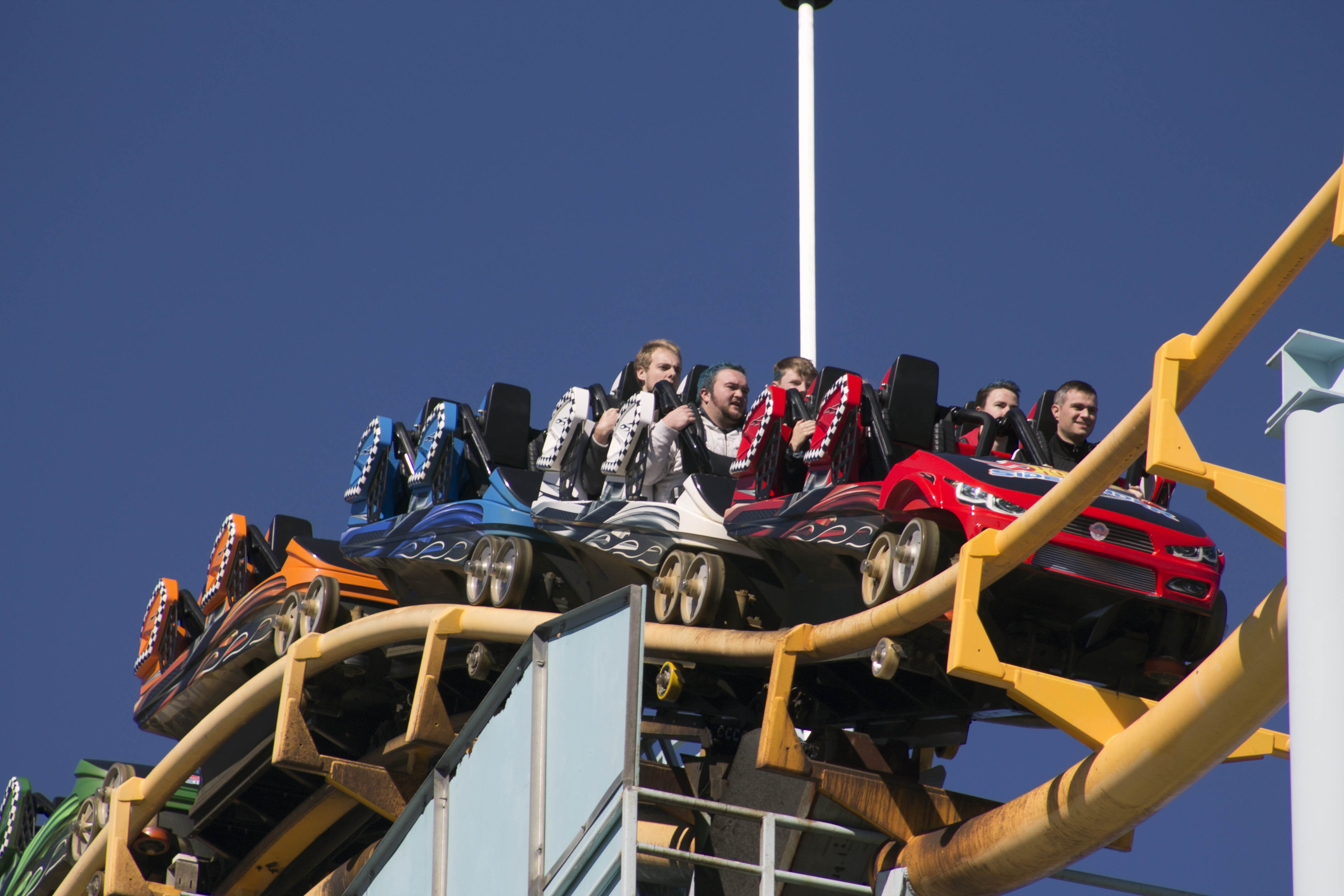
The new trains for the Hot Wheels SideWinder were built by Vekoma.

On 25 October, Dreamworld posted new information on their website regarding the Motorsport Precinct. Including that the Cyclone will be renamed "Hot Wheels SideWinder" after Dreamworld entered into a partnership with Hot Wheels. Dreamworld also revealed that the Precinct will feature the Motorsport Museum (Featuring the 30 Peter Brock V8's) as well as six racing simulators, a new F&B (Food and Beverage) Outlet named Grid Burgers and Sports Bar, as well as a new retail outlet. The Precinct is sponsored by Dunlop, RACQ and Hot Wheels and opened on 26 December 2015. On 29 November 2015, Two Female Tiger Cubs were born. Later named Akasha and Adira. On 26 December 2015, The Motorsports Experience, including the Brock Museum, Trackside Merchandise Outlet, Grid Burgers Food and Beverage as well as the Hot Wheels SideWinder opened as advertised.

On 27 January 2016, Zombie Evilution closed to the public and would no longer operate as a laser tag arena, the attraction was still, however, utilised as a scare-maze for special events, such as Screamworld. On 9 February, Dreamworld welcomed two female white tiger cubs from Kagoshima City, in Japan. These two cubs were viewable in a quarantine enclosure located in front of the Zombie Evilution attraction. On 29 February, Tiger Island closed for refurbishment, the tiger cubs were still viewable in a new Tiger Cub Kindy area, located in Ocean Parade. Tiger Island reopened on 18 September 2016 and Cub Kindy was moved back to Tiger Island.

In April 2016 a man fell out of the log ride when he stood up mid-ride; he was then run over by two more logs that passed, suffered cuts to his head and almost drowned. The ride was closed for two days after while it was investigated by Queensland authorities. The ride reopened shortly after. In October 2016, Kelly's Showdown and Jack's Watering Hole were permanently closed after most of the Gold Rush Country was blocked off to the public due to a fatal accident.

In October 2016 a malfunction of the Thunder River Rapids Ride resulted in the deaths of four people. The ride was permanently closed and later demolished.

In March 2019, Dreamworld announced that Wipeout, the park's oldest thrill ride, would be retired and dismantled, and will not re-open from its maintenance period. It was replaced with a shaded seating space for guests.

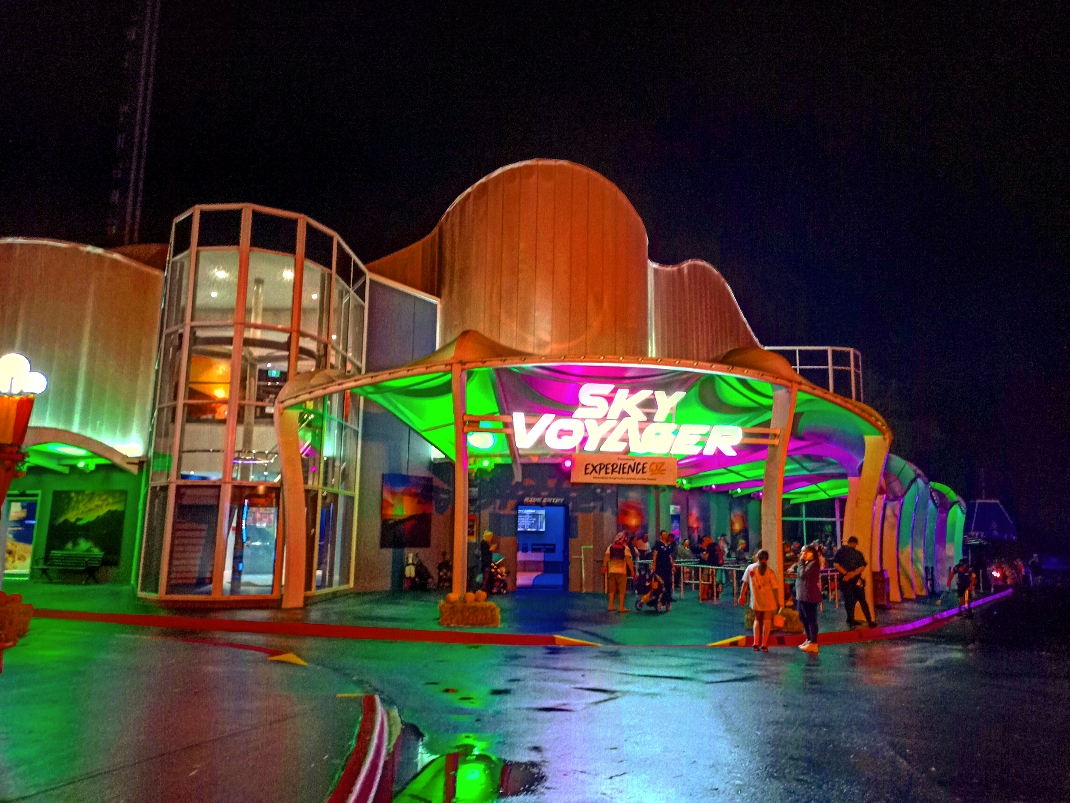
Sky Voyager at night in 2020

At a shareholders conference on 23 August 2019, Ardent Leisure confirmed that the Sky Voyager 'flying theatre' simulator ride would open to the public that day. The $17-million Sky Voyager was built in partnership with Brogent Technologies on the site of the former Dreamworld Cinema. It was originally scheduled to open in late 2018, but was delayed due to issues with design registration. During the conference, Ardent further committed to a $50-million investment in their Dreamworld and WhiteWater World properties over the coming three to five years. A $30-million launched roller coaster built by Mack Rides was scheduled to begin construction in early 2020. The coaster's layout would be based on Europa-Park's Blue Fire coaster. A semi-shuttle multi-launch system would be used; a transfer-track will transport riders to the launch track, where the train is launched forwards, then backwards up a vertical spike, then forwards again to complete the track's layout. The coaster features 1,200 m (3,937 ft) of track, a top speed of 105 km/h (65 mph), maximum height of 38 m (124 ft), and four inversions. In addition, the last row of each train would feature backwards-facing spinning cars. The park also confirmed that ABC Kids World would receive a multi-million dollar revamp, with confirmation of a new ride to come and further details to be announced at a later date.

On 22 June 2019, six children were arrested after they burnt down the Big Brother house. The children were found at Coomera railway station shortly after the arson. Two of the children were charged with vandalism. The house was completely destroyed and it was demolished along with the Dreamworld Studios shortly after. The wind that day blew the smoke away from the park so the park did not need to evacuate and nobody was injured.

Just months after the closure of Wipeout, the park announced on 25 October 2019, that the Tower of Terror ll would cease operation on 3 November of the same year. The park cited "focusing our investment on the future and delivering new, world-class attractions for you to enjoy" as the reason for closing the attraction. The park confirmed that The Giant Drop will continue to operate as normal, with the Tower of Terror II track being removed from the Dreamworld Tower structure over time. The press release also included confirmation that a new thrill ride would be announced sometime in the next year as the park continued forward with their multi-million dollar expansion.

== 2020s ==
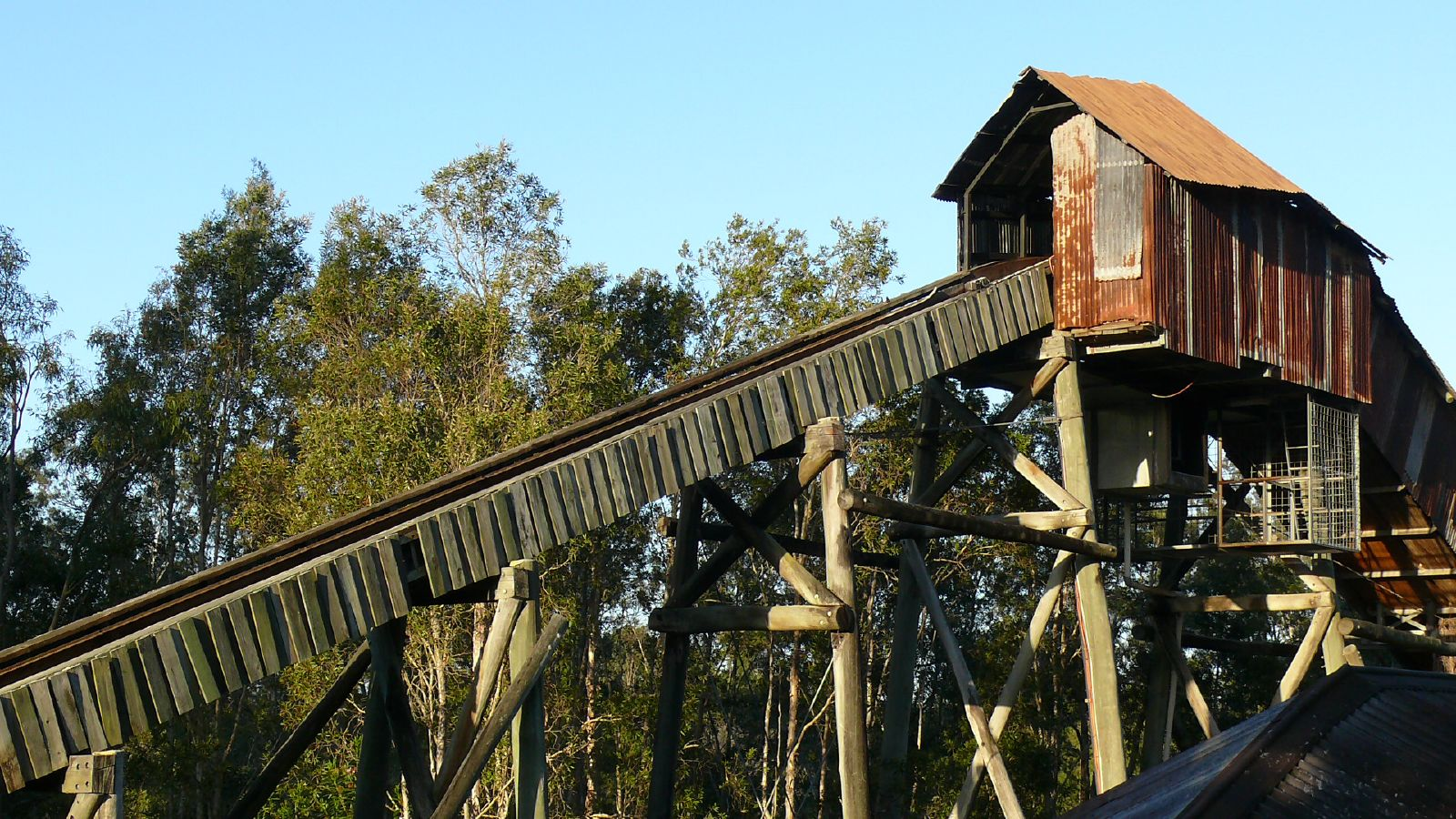
The Rocky Hollow Log Ride was the only remaining original opening day attraction that was still in the original form.

On 7 February 2020, Dreamworld Management announced that the Rocky Hollow Log Ride had been retired from service after 38 years of operation. The following statement was put out by Dreamworld:

"In order to continue Dreamworld's journey as Australia's biggest and best theme park, the Dreamworld team has made the decision to retire the Rocky Hollow Log Ride, which opened 38 years ago on 15 December 1981. Dreamworld guests should be assured that this decision to not reopen the ride following its recent scheduled maintenance has been made to allow us to continue developing new experiences for guests while taking proactive steps to deliver a new generation of rides."

Dreamworld also announced a refurbishment of the Hot Wheels SideWinder coaster (renamed to The Gold Coaster) and an upgrade to ABC Kids World which includes a new ride.

On 22 March 2020, Dreamworld announced that they will temporarily cease operations for both Dreamworld and WhiteWater World due to the ongoing COVID-19 pandemic. Two days later, Dreamworld announced they had donated 755 kilograms (1,664 lb) of leftover food to OzHarvest.

Over a month later, roller coaster supports for the new roller coaster announced in August 2019, started arriving at the Dreamworld carpark on 27 April 2020. Roller coaster tracks started arriving on 2 June 2020, however no land works had been done during the park's closure.

The Play School Art Room was removed from Dreamworld's website and all traces of the attraction were removed with the exception of the online park map on 17 June.

On 12 August 2020, Dreamworld announced the reopening dates for the park as 16 September 2020. Dreamworld also announced that the majority of the Corroboree area was going to be temporarily closed and that FlowRider and the Big Red Car were going to be permanently closed after 14 years. The park removed indoor seating and reconfigured queue lines to allow for improved social distancing.

In November 2020, Dreamworld announced the name for their currently under construction roller coaster that took up the land that was formally occupied by the Thunder River Rapids Ride. The ride, named Steel Taipan, is a Mack Rides Blue Fire clone with a shuttle launch, vertical twisted spike and spinning rear seat. Steel Taipan officially opened on 15 December 2021.

On 17 July 2021, in an email to pass holders, Dreamworld announced that BuzzSaw would be retired after 31 August 2021. The ride was the 13th attraction to be closed since October 2016.

Dreamworld also announced that the Dreamworld Express would be receiving new custom train carriages. The refurbished attraction reopened in July 2022, with a reduced track layout and reversed direction of travel. The train now runs clockwise instead of anti-clockwise, with two stations (Central Park Station and Corroborree Station) instead of four. The previous track loop around the defunct Blue Lagoon site has been removed.

In April 2022, The Giant Drop closed for substantial refurbishment and repainting of the Dreamworld Tower. The attraction reopened on 24 June 2023.

On 24 November 2022, Dreamworld announced a $55m investment to the park, which included Kenny and Belinda's Dreamland, a new themed area to replace the existing DreamWorks Experience area, The Dreamworld Flyer, a new swing ride that is located in Main Street, an expansion to Ocean Parade, and the return of Rivertown, which would replace ABC Kids World, with ABC Kids attractions moving into Kenny and Belinda's Dreamland. Phase 1 of Kenny and Belinda's Dreamland opened on 31 March 2023. Some rides were given temporary names at the time: Escape from Madagascar was renamed Escape Coaster, Gingy's Glider was renamed Candy Flyer, and Puss in Boots Sword Swing was renamed Soaring Swing. Other attractions were rethemed: Shrek's Ogre-Go-Round was rethemed as the Bananas in Pyjamas Carousel, MAD Jungle Jam was rethemed as Belinda's Treehouse, Dronkey Flyers was rethemed as the Big Red Plane, and King Julien's Theatre in the Wild was rethemed as The Dreamworld Theatre. The rest of the attractions, which were from Kung Fu Panda: Land of Awesomeness, were moved to Ocean Parade, and were renamed to the Serpent Slayer and Dreamworld Dodgems. The Dreamworld Flyer opened on 16 December 2023.

On 24 April 2023, Escape Coaster was closed to be rethemed as Kenny's Forest Flyer. At the end of the following month, Soaring Swing was closed and dismantled to make way for the Big Red Boat Coaster, a new junior roller coaster themed to The Wiggles. On 17 July 2023, Dreamworld Dodgems was closed to be rethemed as the Deep Sea Dodgems. In early August, Candy Flyer closed to be rethemed to an unknown ABC Kids/Dreamworld theme, which would later be themed to Play School. Kenny's Forest Flyer reopened in late August 2023, the Deep Sea Dodgems reopened on 1 September, and the hang-glider attraction reopened as the Humpty-Go-Round in mid-September, with the Bananas in Pyjamas Fun Maze moving from ABC Kids World to Kenny and Belinda's Dreamland shortly after. ABC Kids World closed on 8 October 2023, with the Play School Wheel being in the process of relocation to Kenny and Belinda's Dreamland at that time. The attraction reopened there on 9 December 2023. The Big Red Boat Coaster opened on 23 December 2023, making the full opening of Kenny and Belinda's Dreamland.

Rivertown later opened on 23 December 2024 with its star attraction being Jungle Rush, a new family roller coaster that has 12 airtime elements, dedicated show movements, the ability to operate in both a forwards and backwards direction, and immersive theming with storytelling. Also opening with Rivertown was Murrisippi Motors, a reimagined vintage cars, using the original vehicles from 1981, and 2 new electric wheelchair access vehicles. The old Billabong Restaurant was returned to Jane's Rivertown Restaurant, and has many animatronics, immersive theming, and nods to classic attractions. The Motorcoaster shop has been returned to the Rivertown General store, and there are rumours of a potential retheme of the Motorcoaster itself, which has not yet been confirmed.

On 28 January 2025, The Claw (Dreamworld) officially closed after over 20 years of operation. Dreamworld announced plans to replace it with King Claw, a new gyro swing ride that will stand 27 m tall—50% larger and faster than its predecessor—and become the largest of its kind in the Southern Hemisphere. Construction began immediately with an expected opening in late 2025.

Dreamworld will also serve as the filming location for the reboot of Big Brother Australia. A newly constructed house will be built on-site.

== Commercial history ==
Dreamworld was originally owned by John Longhurst, the park's creator. In 1989, Bruce Jenkin's Dreamco purchased the park from Longhurst. The Dreamco company went into administration one year later. During its time in receiveship, Dreamworld's management team invested $40 million on advertising and capital injections for the park. Dreamworld exited liquidation in 1994. The following year the park was sold to Kua Phek Long who was a Singaporean businessman. On 11 June 1998, Macquarie Group subsidiary Macquarie Leisure Trust Group was formed with its first action being the purchase of Dreamworld. In June 2009, Macquarie Leisure was renamed to Ardent Leisure as part of a corporate repositioning which saw the company split from Macquarie. Ardent Leisure continues to own and operate Dreamworld to this day.

== Attraction listing ==
Like all theme parks, attractions are sometimes closed due to age and replaced with more contemporary attractions. Dreamworld has seen this action used a great deal of times, with many attraction closures, replacements and expansions.

Name	Type	Themed area	Manufacturer	Opened	Closed	Status	Q4U
ABC Kids World Fun Spot	Fun spot	ABC Kids World	Dreamworld	2005		Defunct	
Adventure Trails	Jumping castle	Kid's Carnival; Kennyland	Unknown	1999	2002	Defunct	
Aqualoop Flume Ride	Water slide	Blue Lagoon	Unknown	1983	2006	Defunct	
Australian Animal Presentation	Animal show	Corroboree; Australian Wildlife Experience	Dreamworld	2009	2013	Operating	
Australian Sheep Shearing Show; Oakey Creek Farm Show	Animal show	Corroboree; Australian Wildlife Experience	Dreamworld	2010; 2001	2010	Operating	
Australian Wildlife Experience	Animal exhibit	Corroboree; Australian Wildlife Experience	Dreamworld	2001		Operating	
Avalanche; Angry Beavers Spooty Spin; Avalanche; Avalanche	Matterhorn	Kid's World; Nickelodeon Central; Village Oval; Village Green	S.D.C Rides	2011; 2002; 1998; 1983	2012; 2011; 2002; 1998	Defunct	
AVPX	Indoor laser skirmish	Ocean Parade	Sudden Impact!	2009	2013	Defunct	Q4U Virtual Queueing System available
Bananas in Pyjamas Carousel; Shrek's Ogre-Go-Round; Mighty-Go-Round; Backyardigans' Mighty-Go-Round; Nick-O-Round; Carousel; Carousel	Carousel	Kenny and Belinda's Dreamland; DreamWorks Experience; Kid's World; Nickelodeon Central; Nickelodeon Central; Village Oval; Village Green	Ferrari	2023; 2012; 2011; 2008; 2002; 1998; 1983	2023; 2012; 2011; 2008; 2002; 1998	Operating	Q4U Virtual Queueing System available
Bananas in Pyjamas Fun Maze	Mini maze	Kenny and Belinda's Dreamland; ABC Kids World	Dreamworld	2023; 2015	2023	Operating	
Belinda's Treehouse; MAD Jungle Jam; Rainforest Rampage; Wild Thornberrys' Rainforest Rampage	Ball play area	Kenny and Belinda's Dreamland; DreamWorks Experience; Kid's World; Nickelodeon Central	Prime Play	2023; 2012; 2011; 2002	2023; 2012; 2011	Operating	
Big Brother House & Studios	Television set and studios	Dreamworld Studios	Dreamworld	2001	2014	Defunct	
Big Red Boat Coaster	Kiddie roller coaster	Kenny and Belinda's Dreamland	Zamperla	2023		Operating	
Big Red Boat Ride	Rockin' Tug	ABC Kids World	Zamperla	2012		Defunct	Q4U Virtual Queueing System available
Big Red Car Ride	Dark ride	ABC Kids World	Simtech	2005	2020	Defunct	Q4U Virtual Queueing System available
Big Red Plane; Dronkey Flyers; Blues Skidoo; Dream Copters; Dreamcopter; Dreamcopter	Children's rotating ride	Kenny and Belinda's Dreamland; DreamWorks Experience; Kid's World; Nickelodeon Central; Nickelodeon Central; Kid's Carnival; Kennyland	SBF Visa Group	2023; 2012; 2003; 2002; 2002; 1999	2023; 2011; 2003; 2002; 2002	Operating	Q4U Virtual Queueing System available
Brock's Garage	Car museum	Motorsports Experience	Various	2015	2018	Defunct	
BuzzSaw	Steel roller coaster	Gold Rush Country	Maurer Söhne	2011	2021	Defunct	Q4U Virtual Queueing System available
Captain Sturt Paddle Wheeler	Slow boat cruise	Rivertown; River Country	Dreamworld	1981	2012	Defunct	
The Claw	Gyro Swing	Ocean Parade	Intamin	2004		Operating	Q4U Virtual Queueing System available
Country Jamboree	Musical show	Gum Tree Gully	Dreamworld	1982	1990	Defunct	
Creature Cruise	Boat ride	Village Oval	Dreamworld	1997	2002	Defunct	
Deep Sea Dodgems; Dreamworld Dodgems; Skadoosh; Bumper Beach; Rocket Power Bumper Beach; Bumper Bowl; Bumper Bowl	Dodgems	Ocean Parade; DreamWorks Experience; Kid's World; Nickelodeon Central; Village Oval; Village Green	Preston & Barbieri; Bertazzon Rides	2023; 2023; 2012; 2011; 2002; 1998; 1983	2023; 2023; 2012; 2011; 2002; 1998	Operating	Q4U Virtual Queueing System available
Dora the Explorer Sea Planes; Red Baron; Red Baron; Red Baron; Red Baron	Rotating flat ride	Nickelodeon Central; Kennyland; Village Oval; Village Green; Country Fair	Zamperla	2002; 1999; 1998; 1993; 1983	2010; 2002; 1999; 1998; 1993	Defunct	
Dorothy's Rosy Tea Cup Ride	Teacups	ABC Kids World	SBF Visa Group	2006		Defunct	Q4U Virtual Queueing System available
DreamWorks Holiday Shrektacular Show	Show	Main Street	DreamWorks Animation	2011	2012	Defunct	
Dreamworld Cinema; IMAX Theatre	Movie theater	Main Street	RealD Cinema	2011; 1981	2018; 2011	Defunct	
Dreamworld Express; Dreamworld Railway; Dreamworld Gold Coast Railway; Cannonball Express	Railway	Main Street	C&S; Baldwin/Perry	2013; 2005 ???? 1981	2013; 2005 ????	Operating	
The Dreamworld Flyer	Swinger	Main Street	Dreamworld	2023		Operating	
The Dreamworld Theatre; King Julien's Theatre in the Wild; Dreambowl; Slime Bowl	Show arena	Kenny and Belinda's Dreamland; DreamWorks Experience; Kid's World; Nickelodeon Central	Dreamworld	2023; 2012; 2011; 2002	2023; 2012; 2011	Operating	
Eureka Mountain Mine Ride	Wild Mouse roller coaster	Gold Rush Country	HyFab	1986	2006	Defunct	
Farmyard Friends	Petting zoo	Australian Wildlife Experience	Dreamworld	2004	2009	Defunct	
FlowRider	Sheet wave attraction	Ocean Parade	Wave Loch	2006	2020	Defunct	
Game Site; Game Site	Video arcade	Ocean Parade; Country Fair	Dreamworld	2023; 1983	1993	Operating	
The Giant Drop	Drop tower	Gold Rush Country; Rocky Hollow	Intamin	1998		Operating	
Giggle and Hoot Hop and Hoot	Jumping Star	ABC Kids World	Zamperla	2015	2019	Defunct	
Giggle and Hoot Pirate Ship	Façade Pirate Ship	ABC Kids World	Dreamworld	2005		Defunct	
Go Karts	Go-karts	Country Fair	Unknown	1982	1992	Defunct	
The Gold Coaster; Hot Wheels SideWinder; Cyclone	Steel roller coaster	Ocean Parade Motorsports Experience; Ocean Parade	Arrow Dynamics	2020; 2015; 2001	2020; 2015	Operating	Q4U Virtual Queueing System available
Humpty-Go-Round; Candy Flyer; Gingy's Glider; Kite Flyer; SpongeBob FlyPants	Kite flyer	Kenny and Belinda's Dreamland; DreamWorks Experience; Kid's World; Nickelodeon Central	Zamperla	2023; 2023; 2012; 2011; 2008	2023; 2023; 2012; 2011	Operating	Q4U Virtual Queueing System available
Ice Maze	Mini maze	Corroboree	Unknown	2021		Seasonal	
Ice Skating Rink	Ice skating rink	Ocean Parade	Unknown	2019		Seasonal	
Illuminate Light & Laser Spectacular	Light and laser show	Main Street	Laservision	2010		Defunct	
Jungle Rush	Steel roller coaster	Rivertown	Vekoma	2024		Operating	
Kenny Karts; Kenny Karts	Bumper cars	Kid's Carnival; Kennyland	Unknown	1999; 1999	2002; 2002	Defunct	
Kenny's Forest Flyer; Escape Coaster; Escape from Madagascar; Sky Rocket; Rugrats Runaway Reptar	Suspended family roller coaster	Kenny and Belinda's Dreamland; DreamWorks Experience; Kid's World; Nickelodeon Central	Vekoma	2023; 2023; 2012; 2011; 2002	2023; 2023; 2012; 2011	Operating	Q4U Virtual Queueing System available
Kenny's Hay Maze	Mini maze	Ocean Parade	Dreamworld	2019		Seasonal	
Kickback Cove	Shaded seating area	Ocean Parade	Dreamworld	2019		Operating	
Krakatoa's Revenge	Water slide	Blue Lagoon	Unknown	1983	2006	Defunct	
The Lair	Animal exhibit	Adjacent to Tiger Island	Dreamworld	2011		SBNO	
Lara Croft Tomb Raider – Enter the Tomb	Scare attraction	Gum Tree Gully	Sudden Impact!	2003	2004	Defunct	
Little Puff	Miniature railway	Village Oval	Unknown	Unknown	Unknown	Defunct	
Motocoaster; Mick Doohan's Motocoaster	Launched roller coaster	Main Street; Rivertown	Intamin	2007		Operating	Q4U Virtual Queueing System available
The Monster	Inflatable course	Ocean Parade	Unknown	2019	2019	Defunct	
Nightmares	Scare attraction	Blue Lagoon	Sudden Impact!	2006	2007	Defunct	
Play School Art Room	Mini Art room	ABC Kids World	Apple	2015		Defunct	
Play School Wheel	Mini Ferris wheel	Kenny and Belinda's Dreamland; ABC Kids World	Zamperla	2018		Operating	Q4U Virtual Queueing System available
Reef Diver; Enterprise	Enterprise	Ocean Parade; Country Fair	Meisho	2002; 1983	2014; 2002	Defunct	
Rock Climbing Wall	Climbing wall	Ocean Parade	Unknown	2004	2014	Defunct	
Outback Celebration	Musical show	Gum Tree Gully	Dreamworld	2002	2002	Defunct	
Rocky Hollow Log Ride	Log flume	Gold Rush Country; Rocky Hollow	Dreamworld	1981	2020	Defunct	Q4U Virtual Queueing System available
Seabed Splash	Splash zone	Ocean Parade	Dreamworld	2023		Operating	
Serpent Slayer; Pandamonium	Air Race	Ocean Parade; DreamWorks Experience	Zamperla	2012		Operating	
Shockwave	Disk'O Coaster	Ocean Parade	Zamperla	2011		Operating	Q4U Virtual Queueing System available
Skylink Chairlift	Chairlift	Australian Wildlife Experience; Gold Rush Country	Ferrari	1989	2005	Defunct	
Sky Voyager	Flying theater	Main Street	Brogent Technologies	2019		Operating	Q4U Virtual Queueing System available
Soaring Swing; Puss in Boots Sword Swing; Swinger Zinger; Swinger Zinger; Zumer	Swinger	Kenny and Belinda's Dreamland; DreamWorks Experience; Kid's World; Nickelodeon Central; Country Fair	Chance Rides	2023; 2012; 2011; 2002; 1982	2023; 2023; 2012; 2011; 2002	Defunct	Q4U Virtual Queueing System available
Steel Taipan	Steel launched coaster	Gold Rush Country	MACK Rides	2021		Operating	Q4U Virtual Queueing System available
Stingray; Stingray; Roulette	Trabant	Ocean Parade; Ocean Parade; Country Fair	Chance Rides	2001; 1993; 1982	2012; 2001; 1993	Defunct	
Tail Spin	Sky Fly	Ocean Parade	Gerstlauer	2014		Operating	Q4U Virtual Queueing System available
Thunderbolt; Thunderbolt	Steel roller coaster	Ocean Parade; Country Fair	Sanoyas Hishino Meisho	1982; 1982	2003; 2002	Defunct	
Thunder River Rapids Ride; Thunder River Rapids Ride	River rafting ride	Town of Gold Rush; Gold Rush Country	Intamin	2011; 1986	2016; 2011	Defunct	Q4U Virtual Queueing System available
Tiger Island	Animal exhibit	Tiger Island	Dreamworld	1995		Operating	
Toboggan Ride	Toboggan ride	Blue Lagoon	Unknown	1983	2006	Defunct	
Toboggan Slide	Ice slide	Main Street	—N/a	2019		Seasonal	
Tower of Terror II; Tower of Terror; Tower of Terror	Shuttle roller coaster	Main Street; Rivertown; Village Oval	Intamin	2011; 2002; 1998	2019; 2010; 2002	Defunct	Q4U Virtual Queueing System available
V8 Supercars RedLine	Racing simulator	Ocean Parade; Motorsports Experience; Ocean Parade	Dreamworld	2008; 2015; 2008	2019; 2019; 2015	Defunct	
Vintage Car Adventure; Model T Fords	Vintage Cars (Ford Model T)	Corroboree; Rivertown	Ford Motor Company	1981; 1981	????	Operating	Q4U Virtual Queueing System available
Vortex; Gravitron	Gravitron	Ocean Parade; Country Fair	Ferrari	2002; 1993	2009; 2002	Defunct	
Wild Wheels	Car ride	Kennyland	SBF Visa Group	1999	2002	Defunct	
Winterville	Food precinct	Winterville	Unknown	2021		Seasonal	
Wipeout	Waikiki Wave Super Flip	Ocean Parade	Vekoma	1993	2019	Defunct	Q4U Virtual Queueing System available
Zombie Evilution	Indoor laser skirmish	Ocean Parade	Sudden Impact!	2013	2016	Defunct	
TBA	Smart lab	Corroboree	TBA	TBA		Proposed	

== Achievements ==
=== Park awards ===
Award	Presenter	Year achieved
Major Tourist Attraction	Queensland Tourism Awards	2006
Meetings and Business Tourism	Queensland Tourism Awards	2006
Major Tourist Attraction	Queensland Tourism Awards	2005
Major Tourist Attraction	Queensland Tourism Awards	2004
Tourism Product Marketing	Queensland Tourism Awards	2003
Tourism Product Marketing	Queensland Tourism Awards	2002
Best Specialty Venue (National)	Meetings and Events Industry	2002
Best Specialty Venue (National)	Meetings and Events Industry	2001
Best Specialty Venue (State)	Meetings and Events Industry	2001
Major Tourist Attraction	Queensland Tourism Awards	2000
Major Tourist Attraction	Brisbane Tourism Awards	1999
Major Tourist Attraction	Brisbane Tourism Awards	1998
Customer Service Development	Tourism Training Queensland	1998
Customer Service	Gold Coast Regional Tourism and Training	1997
"Ancillary" Category Garden	Gold Coast City Garden Competition	1997
Best Specialty Venue without Accommodation	Meeting Industry Association of Australia	1996
Marketing and Promotion	Queensland Tourism Awards	1996
Best Specialty Venue without Accommodation	Meeting Industry Association of Australia	1995
Marketing and Promotion	Queensland Tourism Awards	1995
Best Specialty Venue without Accommodation	Meeting Industry Association of Australia	1993
Major Tourist Attraction	Queensland Tourism Awards	1992
Number One Tourist Attraction	Australian Tourism Awards	1987

=== Ride records ===
Record	Ride	Date achieved	Successor	
Australia's Longest Privately Owned Railway	Dreamworld Railway	15 December 1981	—N/a	
Australia's Longest Roller Coaster	Thunderbolt	April 1982	DC Rivals HyperCoaster on 16 September 2017	(Note: Despite closing, no other roller coaster in Australia has surpassed this record.)
Southern Hemisphere's Tallest Inversion	BuzzSaw	17 September 2011	—N/a	
World's Fastest Roller Coaster	Tower of Terror	23 January 1997	Dodonpa on 21 December 2001	
World's Tallest Roller Coaster	Tower of Terror	23 January 1997	Superman: Escape from Krypton on 15 March 1997	
World's Tallest Roller Coaster Drop	Tower of Terror	23 January 1997	Top Thrill Dragster on 4 May 2003	(Note: This record was shared with Superman: Escape from Krypton from 15 March 1997 to 4 May 2003.)
World's Fastest Vertical Drop Fun Ride	The Giant Drop	26 December 1998	—N/a	(Note: This record has been shared with Lex Luthor: Drop of Doom since 7 July 2012.)
World's Tallest Vertical Drop Fun Ride	The Giant Drop	26 December 1998	Lex Luthor: Drop of Doom on 7 July 2012	

== See also ==
- WhiteWater World
- Dreamworld's 30th Birthday
- Thunder River Rapids Ride incident
