= Summer Fun =

Summer Fun may refer to:

- Summer Fun, a 2021 novel by American author Jeanne Thornton.
- Summer Fun, an annual publication of The Press of Atlantic City
- Summer Fun, a 1991 seasonal special published by Disney Comics (publishing)
- "Summer Fun", a 1980 song by The Barracudas
- "Summer Fun", a 2006 song by Zdenka Predná
- Summer Fun Water Park in Belton, Texas
- Summer Fun (TV series), an American anthology television series of 1966

== See also ==
- All Girl Summer Fun Band
- Summer Funomenon
