= Illuminate Light & Laser Spectacular =

Defunct seasonal evening show

Dreamworld
- Area: Main Street
- Coordinates: 27.863299°S 153.315958°E
- Status: Closed
- Opening date: 2 April 2010

Ride statistics
- Attraction type: Evening show
- Manufacturer: Laservision
- Designer: Dreamworld
- Duration: 15–30 minutes

Illuminate Light & Laser Spectacular was a seasonal evening show at the Dreamworld theme park on the Gold Coast, Queensland, Australia.

== History ==
On 2 March 2010, Dreamworld announced that they would be adding a light and laser show for the Easter school holidays. The show was included with daily admission, however, guests could purchase a separate Illuminate ticket just to attend the event. The first showing of Illuminate was from 2 April until 16 April 2010. Despite a poor trading period, Ardent Leisure CEO Greg Shaw stated that the launch of Illuminate was a success.

In early May 2010, it was reported that Dreamworld was evaluating the possibility to incorporate Illuminate into night dance parties. Rather than going ahead with dance parties, Dreamworld began to incorporate the show into the existing Screamworld night events.

In the June/July holidays of 2010 Illuminate returned alongside a "Winter Wonderland". In the evenings before the show, guests could play in up to 10,000 kilograms (22,000 lb) of ice or slide down an ice slide.

Illuminate has since returned in 4 other school holiday periods (including the Summer Funomenon) and several Screamworld events.

== Show ==
Illuminate Light & Laser Spectacular was created by Australian entertainment company Laservision. Laservision is the company responsible the world's largest light and sound display, A Symphony of Lights in Hong Kong, as well as the lasers inside the Scooby Doo Spooky Coaster at Warner Bros. Movie World on the Gold Coast.

=== Segments ===
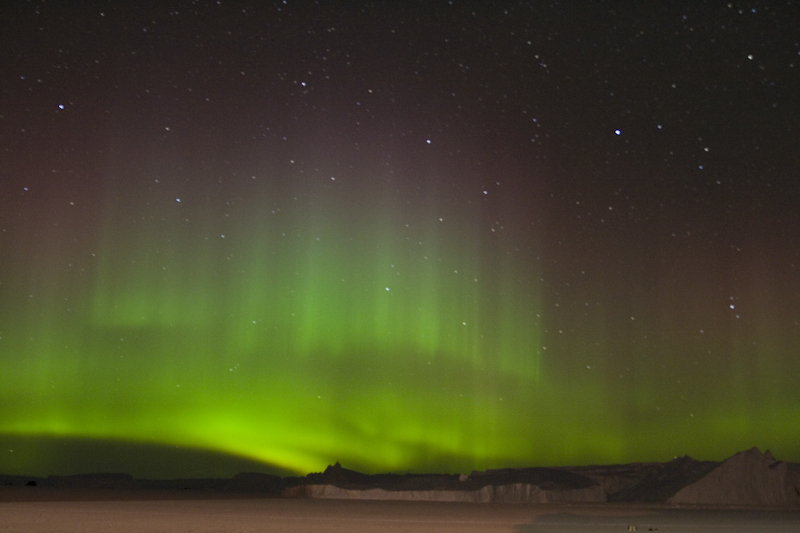
The natural light display Aurora Australis (pictured) is recreated in the Illuminate Light & Laser Spectacular.

Illuminate may show one or more of the following segments in addition to an introduction segment:

- Aurora Australis – based upon the natural light display of the same name (also known as the Southern Lights), the Aurora Australis segment features a variety of light and laser techniques to recreate an aurora.
- Celebrate – set to the song of the same name by Kool & the Gang, the Celebrate segment projects a variety of animated cartoons onto the two 4-metre (13 ft) high water screens.
- Love Today – set to the Mika song of the same name, the Love Today segment recreates the 2010 commercial on the main water screen.
- SpongeBob SquarePants – by utilising the main water screen, an episode of SpongeBob SquarePants is played. This segment will no longer be utilised after the termination of Dreamworld's contract with Nickelodeon.

Start date	End date	Aurora Australis	Celebrate	Love Today	SpongeBob SquarePants
2 April 2010	16 April 2010	No	Yes	Yes	Yes
26 June 2010	16 July 2010	Yes	Yes	Yes	No
27 December 2010	21 January 2011	Yes	Yes	Yes	No
10 April 2011	21 April 2011	Yes	Yes	Yes	No
25 June 2011	15 July 2011	Yes	Yes	Yes	No
23 June 2012	8 July 2012	Yes	Yes	Yes	No

=== Infrastructure ===
Dreamworld has permanately installed the following in Main Street to allow them to consistently run Illuminate in school holiday periods.

- Flamethrower capable of generating 2.4-metre (7.9 ft) tall flames
- Two 4-metre (13 ft) high water screens
- Three high-power laser systems
- Six smoke machines
- Search lights
- LEDs
- Surround sound

== See also ==
- A Symphony of Lights
