= List of events held at Dreamworld =

The following is a list of events that have been held at Dreamworld on the Gold Coast, Australia.

== Annual events ==
=== Happy Halloween ===
In 2004, Dreamworld held a Halloween themed night event called Fright Night during April 2004. The event was the first ever Halloween themed event at any Gold Coast amusement park. The event was also the final time guests could experience Lara Croft Tomb Raider - Enter the Tomb before it was closed and replaced by new Wiggles themed rides. In 2019, Dreamworld announced a family friendly Halloween event that will be held in October instead of April. The event would feature Gold Coast's largest trick or treating event, a family hay maze, a costume contest and much more entertainment. In 2020, Dreamworld was closed due to the COVID-19 pandemic and its events such as Park After Dark and Winterfest were cancelled. Happy Halloween however returned for 2020 despite the COVID-19 pandemic, unlike Movie World's Fright Nights which was subsequently cancelled. The reason was that because of the very successful result of the previous year's event, Dreamworld was committed to bring back the event for another year. The 2020 event would include escape rooms with two different storylines and a costume contest.

=== Spring County Fair ===
Spring County Fair was introduced in 2021 for the Australian spring season. The event is themed to a county fair. The event consists of an interactive petting zoo, a dedicated food and beverage precinct, a chain sawing demonstration, line dancing, acoustic music and craft beers. Show bags are sold throughout the park along with carnival games.

=== Winterfest ===
Winterfest was introduced in 2019 for the Australian winter season. The event is themed to European winter. The event is held during both the day and night. The 2019 event consisted of several photo opportunities, a toboggan slide and an indoor ice skating rink. During the event, a European food outlet is held at the “Food Market” in Ocean Parade. Winterfest was cancelled in 2020 due to the COVID-19 pandemic. On 25 May 2021, Dreamworld announced the 2021 event. The event is set to include a temporary retheme of rides, attractions and food and shopping outlets. The event will also feature a new European food precinct, several photo opportunities, ice skating arena and an ice maze.

== Other events ==
=== Park After Dark ===
Park After Dark (formerly Screamworld) is a night time event held at Dreamworld after park hours. The event is held several times a year. Each Park After Dark event is themed differently. The event was inaugurated on 24 June 2017, with the first event being themed as “Thrillathon”. As of May 2021, only one event “Illusions” was cancelled. The event consists of ride's at night, special entertainment and attractions. The event is set to return to coincide with Winterfest.

== Past events ==
=== ABC Kids Month ===
ABC Kids Month (formerly Kids Month) was an annual kids event held for a month from 2017 to 2019. The event was usually held from May to June. The event contained several appearances of ABC Kids characters along with special performances by The Wiggles. Characters such as Peppa Pig and PJ Masks would appear and perform. ABC Kids Month did not return in 2020 and it is currently unknown whether it will return.

=== Dreamworld’s 30th Birthday ===
Dreamworld's 30th Birthday was a birthday event held throughout 2010 and 2011 to celebrate the parks 30th birthday. The event consisted of several special live performances, a T-shirt competition, the addition of new attractions and a new precinct. New attractions included: BuzzSaw, Shockwave and The Lair. The event saw a 41.3% increase in attendance and a 6.7% increase in revenue.

=== Xtremeworld ===
Xtremeworld was an event that was first introduced in the 1990s. Xtremeworld consisted of stunts performed on skateboards, roller blades, BMX bikes and motocross. Since then, Dreamworld has held a total of three events, with the last being held in late 2005 and early 2006.

=== Other events ===
Throughout summer school holidays Dreamworld holds several special live shows and exhibits. These included (but are not limited to): Monster Trucks - Thrillmasters, The Fire Machine, Fun House and Bluey Live, MTV Plugs Into Dreamworld, Pirate of the Pacific and Moscow Circus.
