= The Lair (Dreamworld) =

Exotic animal exhibit

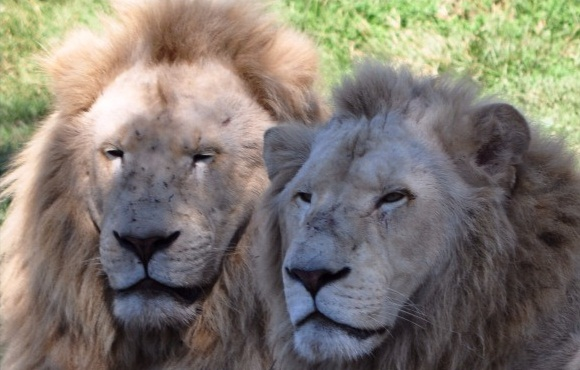
- Two white lions at the National Zoo & Aquarium. The Lair's original inhabitants were lions on loan from the zoo.

Dreamworld
- Area: Adjacent to Tiger Island
- Coordinates: 27°51′53.21″S 153°19′2.7″E
- Status: Closed
- Opening date: 9 April 2011

Ride statistics
- Attraction type: Exotic animal exhibit
- Designer: Dreamworld
- Theme: Timbavati, South Africa
- Size: 334 m^{2} (3,600 sq ft)

The Lair is an exotic animal exhibit at the Dreamworld theme park on the Gold Coast, Australia. It opened on 9 April 2011 with two white lions. The exhibit is to be used for a variety of other animals in the future.

== History ==
On 16 February 2011, Ardent Leisure (the owners of Dreamworld) released their half year results report for the 2011 financial year. The report detailed an outlook for their 30th Birthday year. One of the items listed was an Easter holiday promotion where an exotic animal species will be showcased. Two weeks prior, the Gold Coast Bulletin detailed the rumours of white lions coming to Dreamworld. On 21 February 2011, Dreamworld officially announced via Facebook that white lions would be at Dreamworld for the April school holidays. On 16 March 2011, plans for The Lair were released by Dreamworld. On 9 April 2011, the attraction was officially opened to the public with two white lions.

== Exhibit ==
The Lair is themed to the Timbavati region in South Africa. The interactive exhibit features triple laminated glass panels which allow guests to view the animals up close. The exhibit also features a second storey. This level features a glass-walled platform where trainers and paying guests can feed the animals.

== Inhabitants ==
=== White lions ===
In April 2011 Dreamworld began a promotion where white lions were on temporary exhibition from National Zoo & Aquarium which was renovating its facilities. On 30 March 2011, two lions, Jake and Mischka, were introduced into The Lair. The exhibit housed these two lions on public display from 9 April through to 9 May. A second pair of lions, Achilles and Agamemnon, were featured in the exhibit from 16 May until 7 August 2011.

=== Tigers ===
On 7 September 2011, a new feeding experience with Dreamworld's existing Bengal and Sumatran tigers began at the park. Tigers from Tiger Island can be seen in The Lair. For a set fee, guests can tong-feed the tigers.

== See also ==
- Dreamworld's 30th Birthday
- 2011 in amusement parks
