= Tiger Island (Dreamworld) =

Wildlife attraction

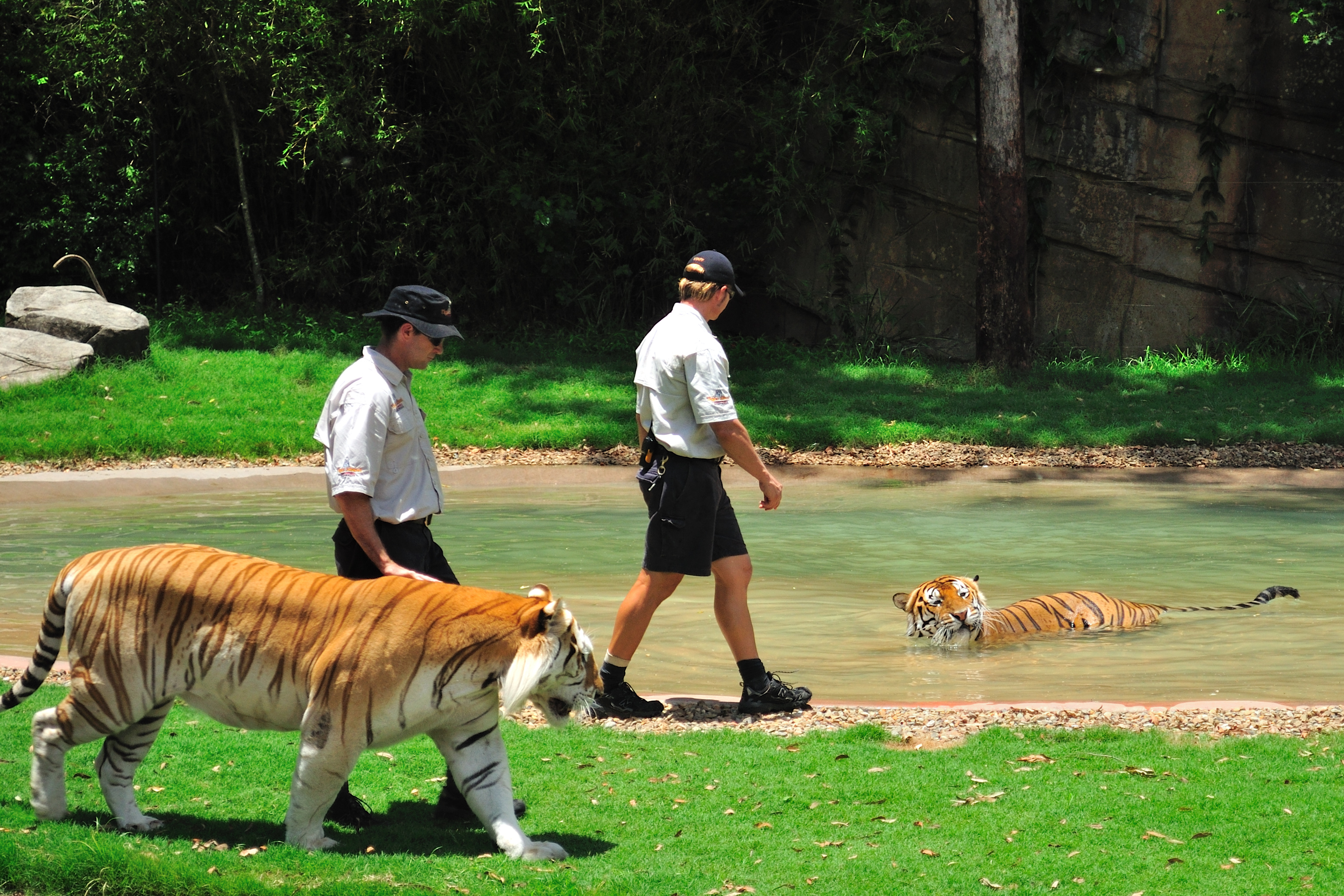
- Trainers interact with the tigers in the exhibit.
- Interactive map of Tiger Island
- Theme: Asian rainforests

Attractions
- Total: 1
- Shows: 1

Dreamworld
- Coordinates: 27°51′52.91″S 153°19′4.13″E
- Status: Operating
- Opened: 1995

Tiger Island is a wildlife attraction in the Dreamworld amusement park on the Gold Coast, Queensland, Australia. This exhibit houses for both the Bengal and Sumatran tiger species. The tigers have been raised within the compound and are free to roam and interact with the visitors in the amusement park.

== History ==
Tiger Island opened in 1995 as one of only two interactive tiger exhibits in the world. The exhibit featured various locations for the tigers to live, swim and play. Three years later, in October 1998, Dreamworld welcomed their first litter of four Bengal tiger cubs, consisting of Rama, Sita, Sultan and Taj. In 2006, the first litter of Sumatran tiger cubs was born, featuring Indah and Rahni. A nursery and smaller tiger enclosure were constructed to showcase the younger tigers before being released into the main exhibit.

On June 20 2012, Mohan, one of Dreamworld's original Bengal tigers, died after a battle with kidney disease. Mohan was born on November 2 1994 in the United States, before being transferred to Dreamworld for the opening of Tiger Island. When he arrived, he was known as the "King of Tiger Island".

In 2015, two litters were born to Raja (father) and Nika (mother). On July 25, Kai, a male cub, was born, while two female cubs were born on November 29, to the same parents. Later, during a competition in conjunction with Channel 7's Sunrise Morning Show, the two female cubs were named Akasha and Adira.

On February 19 2016, two white tiger cubs were put on public display in a temporary quarantine enclosure, found in Ocean Parade, in front of Zombie Evilution. The cubs, who were later to be named Kiko and Kali, were flown in from Japan under Dreamworld's partnership arrangement with Hirakawa Zoo in Kagoshima City.

On February 29 2016, the Tiger Island area closed for refurbishment. It re-opened on September 18 2016, with designs by Jamie Durie.

== Tigers ==
Name	Species	Date of birth	Sex	Colour	Weight	Other information	Meaning of name	Notes
Javi	Sumatran/Siberian	26 April 2019	♂	Golden with dark stripes		Javi was born to Adira and Pi and he is the brother of Zakari.	Victorious	
Jaya	Sumatran	9 June 2007	♀	Golden with dark stripes	70 kilograms (150 lb)	Jaya was born with two sisters, Shanti and Ndari.	Victorious	
Kai	Sumatran/Siberian	25 July 2015	♂	Golden with dark stripes	25 kilograms (55 lb)	A male cub born to Nika and Raja, Kai is the older brother of the two female cubs born on 29 November 2015.	Strong and Unbreakable	
Khan	Sumatran/Siberian	26 May 2019	♂	Golden with dark stripes		Khan was born to Nika and Raja, and was the only cub of his litter.	Leader who focuses on important issues	
Nika	Bengal/Siberian	15 April 2006	♀	Golden with dark stripes	160 kilograms (350 lb)	Born in Poland, Nika was transferred to Dreamworld in 2013. Her genetics are an important addition to the Tiger Island program. Nika has not been hand-reared and cannot be handled by Tiger Island staff.	Belongs to God	
Pi	Bengal/Sumatran	19 July 2010	♂	Golden with dark stripes	125 kilograms (276 lb)	Born at Cairns Wildlife Safari Reserve, Pi was mis-mothered and transferred to Dreamworld to be hand-reared by Dreamworld's experienced tiger handlers. The transfer has given Pi the opportunity to socialise with the other big cats.	The main character in the book Life of Pi	
Raja	Sumatran	25 December 2003	♂	Golden with dark stripes	110 kilograms (240 lb)	Due to not being hand-reared, Raja cannot be handled by Tiger Island staff and lives in a purpose-built exhibit in the back of house.	King	
Zakari	Sumatran/Siberian	26 April 2019	♂	Golden with dark stripes		Zakari was born to Adira and Pi and is the older brother of Javi by 35 minutes.	Those who desire to inspire others, to a higher cause	
Shanti	Sumatran	9 June 2007	♀	Golden with dark stripes	70 kilograms (150 lb)	Shanti was born with two sisters, Jaya and Ndari.	Inner Peace	
Akasha	Sumatran/Siberian	29 November 2015	♀	Golden with dark stripes		One of two sisters born to Nika and Raja, and part of the second litter born in 2015.	Akasha is of Indian origin, where tigers are still able to be found in the wild.	
Adira	Sumatran/Siberian	29 November 2015	♀	Golden with dark stripes		The second of two sisters born to Nika and Raja.	Adira means strong and noble, reflecting the majestic nature of tigers.	
Kiko	Bengal	2 November 2015	♀	White with dark stripes		One of two female white tiger cubs flown in from Hirakawa Zoo in Japan to be part of Dreamworld's breeding program.		
Kali	Bengal	2 November 2015	♀	White with dark stripes		One of two female white tiger cubs flown in from Hirakawa Zoo in Japan to be part of Dreamworld's breeding program.		

== Former tigers ==
This section shows a list of tigers that were present at the park, but are no longer there.

Name	Species	Date of birth	Sex	Colour	Weight	Other information	Meaning of name	Notes
Melati	Sumatran	24 January 2018	♀	Golden with dark stripes	45 kilograms (99 lb)	The sister of Mya, Melati was transferred with her sister to the National Zoo & Aquarium in Canberra in early September 2018.	Jasmine Flower	
Mya	Sumatran	24 January 2018	♀	Golden with dark stripes	48 kilograms (106 lb)	The sister of Melati, Mya was transferred with her sister to the National Zoo & Aquarium in Canberra in early September 2018.	"Beloved" or "Great"	
Indah	Sumatran	31 March 2006	♀	Golden with dark stripes	80 kilograms (180 lb)	Indah was one of the first litter of Sumatran tiger cubs born at Dreamworld. The sister of Rahni, her father is Raja. Indah was transferred to Western Plains Zoo, Dubbo.	Beautiful	
Kato	Sumatran	24 October 2001	♂	Golden with dark stripes	160 kilograms (350 lb)	Kato was born in a wildlife park in Sydney and was transferred less than a month later. He was transferred to Symbio Zoo, Sydney.	Pure	
Rahni	Sumatran	31 March 2006	♀	Golden with dark stripes	80 kilograms (180 lb)	Rahni was one of the first litter of Sumatran tiger cubs born at Dreamworld. The sister of Indah, her father is Raja. She now lives at the National Zoo and Aquarium, Canberra.	Brave	
Sali	Sumatran	11 April 2008	♀	Golden with dark stripes	70 kilograms (150 lb)	Sali was born in captivity at Perth Zoo.	Steadfast	
Sultan	Bengal	23 October 1998	♂	Golden with dark stripes	200 kilograms (440 lb)	The son of Mohan and Samara, and the brother of Rama, Sita and Taj, Sultan was part of the Awesome Pawsome born at Dreamworld. He died on 16 January 2016.	Sultan means "Ruler."	
Sita	Bengal	23 October 1998	♀	Golden with light stripes	135 kilograms (298 lb)	The daughter of Mohan and Samara, and the sister of Rama, Sultan and Taj, Sita was part of the Awesome Pawsome born at Dreamworld. She died on 30 May 2017.	Goddess of the Land	
Taj	Bengal	23 October 1998	♂	White with light stripes	195 kilograms (430 lb)	The son of Mohan and Samara, and the brother of Rama, Sita and Sultan, Taj was part of the Awesome Pawsome born at Dreamworld. He died in 2013.	Crown	
Rama	Bengal	23 October 1998	♂	Golden with light stripes	180 kilograms (400 lb)	The son of Mohan and Samara, and the brother of Sultan, Sita and Taj, Rama was part of the Awesome Pawsome born at Dreamworld. He died in December 2017.	Kindly God	
Inca	Cougar	4 July 1995	♀	Fawn	Between 35 kilograms (77 lb) and 40 kilograms (88 lb).	Inca was born in New South Wales and moved to Dreamworld when she was three weeks old, along with her sister, Sierra. Off-public exhibit, but still alive as of July 2016.	Abundance	
Sierra	Cougar	4 July 1995	♀	Fawn	Between 35 kilograms (77 lb) and 40 kilograms (88 lb).	Sierra was born in New South Wales and moved to Dreamworld when she was three weeks old, along with her sister, Inca. Off-public exhibit, but still alive as of July 2016.	Mountains	
Baru	Bengal	2 March 2012	♂	Golden with dark stripes	165 kg	Baru is the brother of Ravi. Born in a wildlife park in Sydney, he was transferred less than a month later. He was transferred to the National Zoo and Aquarium, Canberra.		
Ndari	Sumatran	9 June 2007	♀	Golden with dark stripes	70 kg	Ndari was born with two sisters, Shanti and Jaya. She has since been transferred to the National Zoo and Aquarium, Canberra.	Full Moon	
Ravi	Bengal	2 March 2013	♂	Golden with dark stripes	165 kg	Ravi is the brother of Baru. Born in a wildlife park in Sydney, he was transferred less than a month later. He was transferred to the National Zoo and Aquarium, Canberra.		
Mohan	Bengal	2 November 1994	♂	White with light stripes	180 kg	The father of Sultan, Sita, Rama and Taj, Mohan was one of the original tigers when Tiger Island first opened in 1995. He died on 20 June 2012.	Charming	
Samara	Bengal	1994	♀	Golden with dark stripes		The mother of Sultan, Sita, Rama and Taj, Samara was one of the original tigers when Tiger Island first opened in 1995. She was moved to the National Zoo and Aquarium in Canberra, where she died in 2004.		
Bakkar	Bengal	30 December 1994	♂	Golden with dark stripes		Bakkar was one of the original tigers when Tiger Island first opened in 1995. He was moved to Western Plains Zoo at Dubbo, and later to the National Zoo and Aquarium in Canberra, where he died in June 2016.		
Rakkhan	Bengal	22 December 1994	♂	Golden with dark stripes	150 kg	Rakkhan was one of the original tigers when Tiger Island first opened in 1995.		
Kyla	Bengal	1994	♀	White with dark stripes		Kyla was one of the original tigers when Tiger Island first opened in 1995. She died in late 1996.		
Jai	Bengal	1994	♀	White with dark stripes		Jai was one of the original tigers when Tiger Island first opened in 1995.		
Kaasha	Bengal	24 October 2001	♀	Golden with dark stripes		Kaasha was born in a wildlife park in Sydney and was transferred less than a month later. The sister of Kato, she died less than a year after arriving at Dreamworld.		
Soraya	Sumatran	9 June 2002	♀	Golden with dark stripes	85 kg	Soraya had five cubs in two litters with Raja. She was moved to Mogo Zoo to breed with another male.	Princess	

== Tiger presentations ==
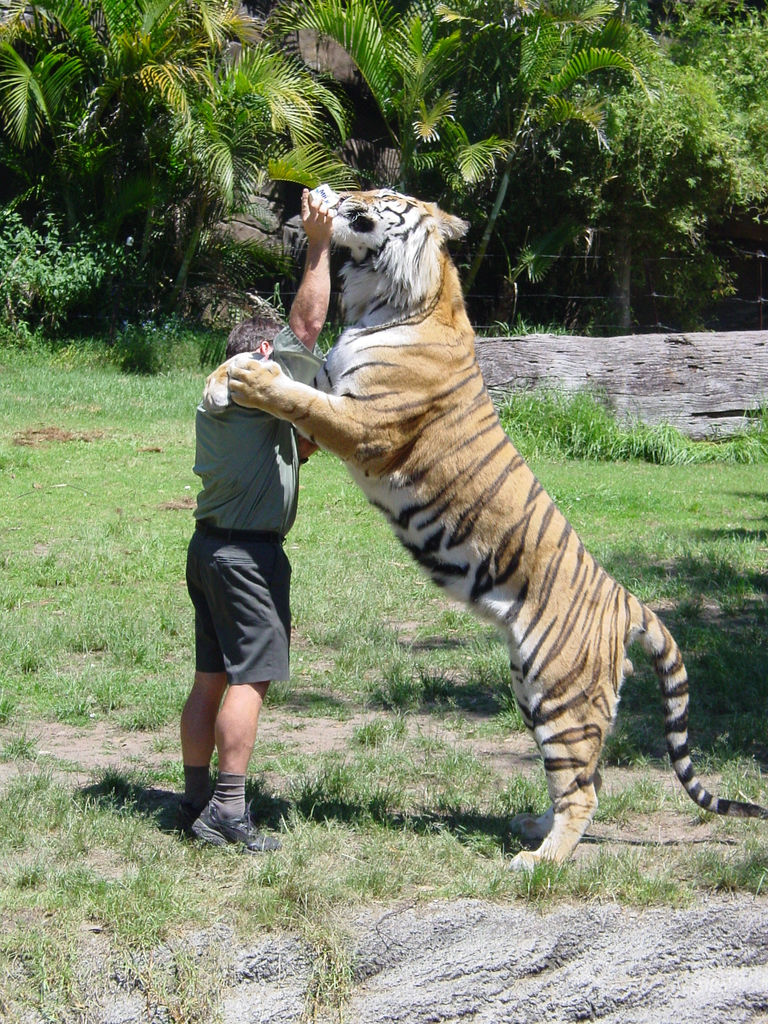
A tiger drinking milk from a trainers hand during a tiger presentation.

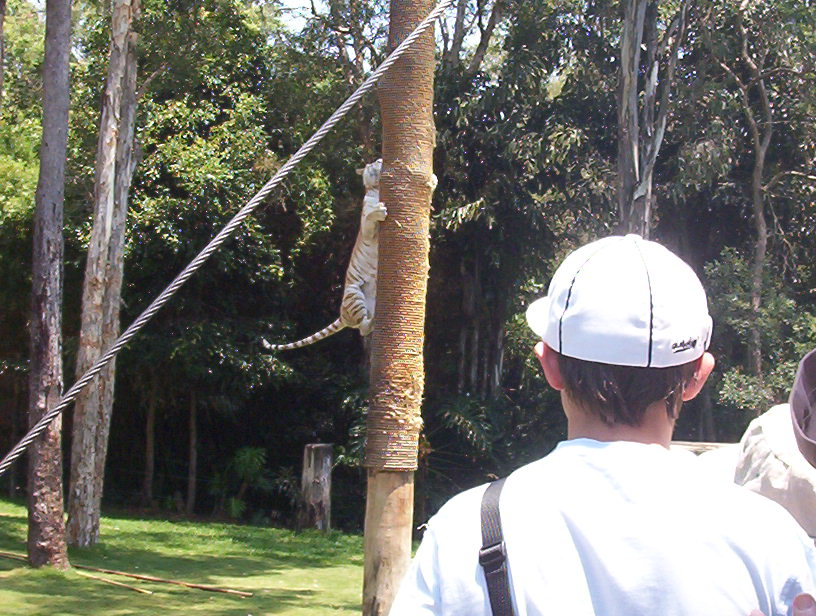
One of the tigers retrieving food from the top of a post during the show.

Tiger presentations are performed twice daily in the main exhibit. Guests can watch as the tigers perform feats which showcase their agility. During the presentation, the tigers climb 20-foot (6.1 m) trees and jump up to 10-foot (3.0 m) into the air. In 2013, Cub College featured some of the younger tigers' performances.

== Dreamworld Wildlife Foundation ==
In 1997, Dreamworld established the Dreamworld Tiger Fund, which aimed to support various projects to help save tigers in the wild. The fund contributed over a million dollars to this cause. The fund used a percentage of profits from merchandise sales, tiger walks and tiger photos as well as donations from Dreamworld's guests and the wider community.

In March 2012, the DWF was established, collaborating with existing wildlife conservation groups to bring substantial financial support to the conservation movement on a global scale.

The program allows individuals to adopt animals associated with Dreamworld Corroboree, including Tasmanian devils, crocodiles, red kangaroos and cassowaries, as well as tigers at Tiger Island.

== Shopping and dining ==
Overlooking the tiger exhibit are retail facilities for tiger merchandise at Tiger Bazaar and a dining outlet called Island Noodle Hut.

== See also ==
- The Lair, an adjacent exotic animal exhibit at Dreamworld
- Dreamworld Corroboree, the Australian wildlife exhibit found at the park
