= Shockwave (Dreamworld) =

Zamperla Disk'O Coaster

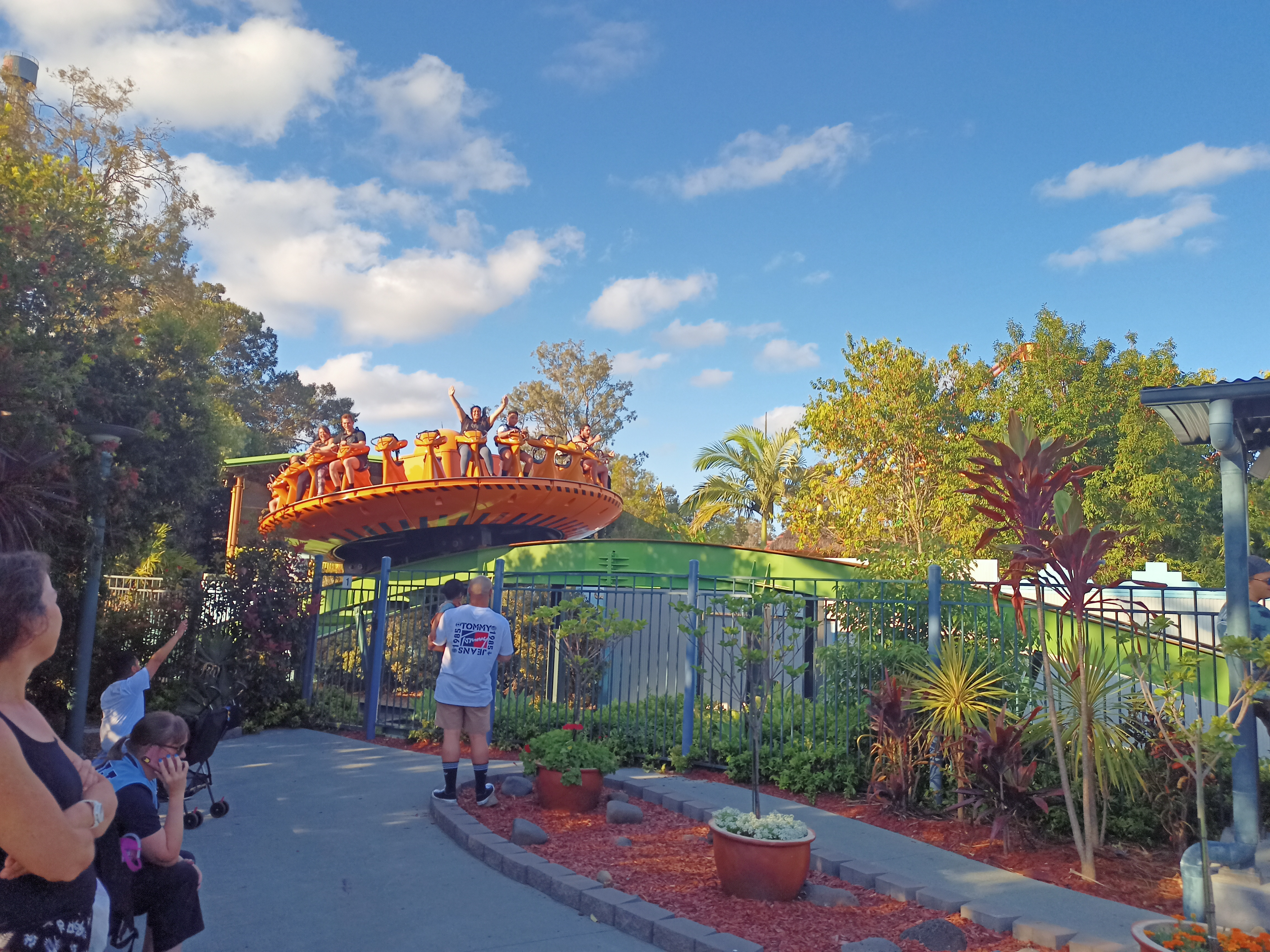
- The 24 seater discovery vessel going up the small hill.

Dreamworld
- Area: Ocean Parade
- Coordinates: 27.864320°S 153.316493°E
- Status: Operating
- Opening date: 25 June 2011

Ride statistics
- Attraction type: Disk'O Coaster
- Manufacturer: Zamperla
- Model: Custom
- Theme: Hydro-energy plant
- Height: 15.5 m (51 ft)
- Length: 63 m (207 ft)
- Speed: 54 km/h (34 mph)
- 12 rpm
- G-force: 2.5
- Capacity: 360 riders per hour
- Vehicle type: Deep sea discovery vessel
- Vehicles: 1x9-tonne (9.9-ton) disk
- Riders per vehicle: 24
- Duration: 90 seconds
- Height restriction: 120 cm (3 ft 11 in)
- Ride Express available

Shockwave is a Zamperla Disk'O Coaster in the Ocean Parade area of the Dreamworld theme park on the Gold Coast, Queensland, Australia. The ride opened on 25 June 2011.

== History ==
On 16 February 2011, Ardent Leisure released the financial results for the six months ending December 2010 as well as an outlook for 2011. This outlook announced the plans to have an Easter promotion, the addition of two new rides, and a further "new product" during the course of 2011. On 7 April 2011, further details were announced stating that one of these new rides would be a family thrill ride set to open in June. Just days after this announcement, construction began in a location between Ocean Parade and Nickelodeon Central. On 18 May 2011, Dreamworld officially announced that they would be adding a Zamperla Disk'O Coaster called Shockwave to Ocean Parade. By 7 June 2011, parts for the ride had arrived at Dreamworld and concept art for the ride had been released. A television marketing campaign started for the ride in mid June. Testing for the ride began less than a week before the scheduled opening of the ride. The ride opened on 25 June 2011 to coincide with the local school holidays.

== Ride ==
Themed as a hydro-energy plant, Shockwave is a Zamperla Disk'O Coaster. From the docking station, riders sit on an orange circular platform (known as the discovery vessel) with 24 outward-facing seats. This platform moves back and forth along a halfpipe track (with a small hill in the middle) reaching speeds of 54 kilometres per hour (34 mph). The platform itself spins at a rate of 12 revolutions per minute as it traverses the track. During the 90 second ride, guests will pull up to 2.5 Gs as they spin along the 63-metre (207 ft) sea green-coloured track.

== See also ==
- Dreamworld's 30th Birthday
- 2011 in amusement parks
