= Dreamworld's 30th Birthday =

Previous event (late 2010–2011)

- Genre: Birthday
- Locations: Dreamworld; 27.864°S 153.3158°E
- Years active: 2010–2011
- Website: Official website

Dreamworld's 30th Birthday was celebrated throughout 2011 at the Dreamworld amusement park on the Gold Coast, Australia.

== Overview ==
In August 2010, the owners of Dreamworld, Ardent Leisure, approved a capital expenditure plan in both Dreamworld and WhiteWater World to "strengthen ride inventory and consumer appeal". This coincides directly with their 30th birthday.

== 2010 ==
=== T-shirt competition ===
In late 2010, Dreamworld held a T-shirt designing competition on its Facebook page with the aim of creating a 30th Birthday promotional T-shirt to be sold in the park in 2011.

=== Main Street upgrade ===
Main Street was extensively upgraded in late 2010. A roof was constructed over a small portion of Main Street near the entrances for Nickelodeon Central and Ocean Parade. The IMAX Theatre was renovated to become a fully functioning movie theatre named the Dreamworld Cinema. The Marketplace was renovated to include two additional entry points for guests.

== Summer Funomenon ==
To kick off the celebrations of its 30th birthday, Dreamworld hosted the Summer Funomenon from 27 December 2010 through to 21 January 2011. The Summer Funomenon featured ten new shows just for the summer school holiday period. Dreamworld were originally planning on showing SpongeBob SquarePants 4-D in their newly renovated theatre, however, at the last minute they changed the film to The Curse of Skull Rock 3D.

Show	Description	Historical Significance	Notes
Dorothy the Dinosaur Show	A 25-minute sing-along show for young children featuring Dorothy the Dinosaur, Wags the Dog and Captain Feathersword in the Fun Spot at Wiggles World.	A Dorothy the Dinosaur Show was featured during a few school holiday periods since Wiggles World opened in 2005.	
The Wiggles Hits Show	A 20-minute sing-along show for young children featuring The Wiggles costume characters in Main Street.	None	
The Goldie Show	Goldie the Clown starred in his own 20-minute show in Main Street which featured gags, jokes, magic tricks and juggling.	In 2002, during the construction of Nick Central, Goldie starred in a similar show of his own where Wiggles World currently stands.	
The Kenny Koala Show	A children's show featuring Dreamworld's mascots Kenny Koala and Belinda Brown singing a variety of songs in Main Street for 20 minutes.	One of the longest running shows at Dreamworld returned for the Summer Funomenon. A similar show existed at the park until Nick Central was constructed in 2002 and the show stage was demolished.	
Mass Sliming	Twice daily, WhiteWater World's Nickelodeon Pipeline Plunge tipping bucket was filled with green colouring to dump 1,000 litres (220 imp gal; 260 US gal) of slime on waiting guests.	In 2009, Slime Fest was held twice and included mass slimings.	
The Curse of Skull Rock 3D	Shown 8 times throughout the day, this 3-D film was shown in the newly revamped Dreamworld Cinema starring a whole cast of pirates. The film has continued after the Summer Funomenon ceased.	The newly renovated Dreamworld Cinema replaces the IMAX theatre which was one of Dreamworld's original attractions. The particular film, however, has no historical significance.	
Illusion Show featuring Matt Hollywood	An illusion and magic show in Main Street which starred Australian illusionist Matt Hollywood.	In 2004, Dreamworld played host to the Believe in Dreams illusion show at Dreamworld Studios. The previous show starred John Taylor.	
Australian Sheep Shearing Show	Located in the new Dreamworld Woolshed in the Australian Wildlife Experience, this show featured a variety of farmyard animals in an Australian sheep shearing station. The show has continued after the Summer Funomenon ceased.	This show is a revamp of the original Oakey Creek Farm Show which ended in 2010. This show continued after the Summer Funomenon in the newly constructed Dreamworld Woolshed.	
30 Year Jukebox Show	A 45-minute show located at the Main Street stage which featured a look back at the popular songs of the past three decades.	Popular music since Dreamworld opened in 1981.	
Dreamworld Dreamtime	Located near the old Oakey Creek Farm station in the Australian Wildlife Experience, this show featured the descendants of the Kombumerri Indigenous Australians, the original owners of the land.	First introduced in the September/October school holidays in 2010, this show returned for a second season.	

== 2011 ==
On 16 February 2011, Ardent Leisure released the financial results for the six months ending December 2010 as well as an outlook for 2011. This outlook announced the plans to have an Easter promotion, the addition of two new rides, and a further "new product" during the course of 2011. On 7 April 2011, further details were announced about the two rides. The first would be a family thrill ride set to open in June with the second being a major thrill ride set to open in September.

=== The Lair ===
Beginning in April, Dreamworld ran a promotion where white lions were on temporary exhibition from National Zoo & Aquarium who were renovating their facilities. In March 2011, Dreamworld officially announced that "The Lair" would be themed to the Timbavati region in South Africa. The interactive exhibit features triple laminated glass panels which allow guests to view the inhabitants up close. On 30 March 2011, two lions, Jake and Mischka, were introduced into the exhibit. The exhibit housed these two lions on public show from 9 April through to 30 April. A second pair of lions, Achilles and Agamemnon, were featured in the exhibit from 16 May until 7 August 2011. The Lair is now being used for tiger feeding sessions.

=== Shockwave ===
Construction began in April 2011 in a location between Ocean Parade and Kid's World (previously Nickelodeon Central) for the family thrill ride announced just days prior. On 18 May 2011, Dreamworld officially announced that they would be adding a Zamperla Disk'O called Shockwave to Ocean Parade. The ride opened on 25 June 2011.

=== Winter holidays ===
Following the success of the Summer Funomenon, several of the shows returned for the winter holiday period. Illuminate was also run. Both The Goldie Show and The Kenny Koala show are expected to continue in the Dreambowl after the conclusion of the winter holiday period.

Show	Description	Notes
Dorothy the Dinosaur Show	A 25-minute sing-along show for young children featuring Dorothy the Dinosaur, Wags the Dog and Captain Feathersword in the Fun Spot at Wiggles World.	
The Wiggles Hits Show	A 20-minute sing-along show for young children featuring The Wiggles Costume Characters in the Fun Spot at Wiggles World.	
The Goldie Show	Goldie the Clown stars in his own 20-minute show in the Dreambowl which features gags, jokes, magic tricks and juggling.	
The Kenny Koala Show	A children's show featuring Dreamworld's mascots Kenny Koala and Belinda Brown singing a variety of songs in the Dreambowl for 20 minutes.	

=== BuzzSaw ===
BuzzSaw is a Maurer Söhne SkyLoop roller coaster that opened in the Gold Rush Country section of Dreamworld on 17 September 2011. The opening of BuzzSaw was coupled with the renovation and repainting of all buildings in Gold Rush Country.

=== DreamWorks Animation ===
On 10 November 2011, Dreamworld announced a three-stage plan to incorporate DreamWorks Animation films and characters into its theme park. The first phase, set to open 19 December 2011, will include the DreamWorks Holiday Shrektacular Show featuring 8 DreamWorks Animation characters live on stage. The second phase will include the retheming of Dreamworld's kids area, Kid's World, into a 8,400-square-metre (90,000 sq ft) DreamWorks Experience precinct. This phase opened Easter 2012. The final phase will be the development of an eating and meet-and-greet area called Kung Fu garden. The three phases were expected to cost $10 million to complete.

== Marketing ==
To market their 30th birthday, Dreamworld teamed up with Blame Ringo to make Dreamworld Holiday – a remake of an old theme song called Take a Trip Away. The theme song was first used on the Summer Funomenon commercial which was shown from November through to January. Furthermore, helicopter banner advertising was employed during the Summer Funomenon which ran along the Gold Coast beaches.

== Performance ==
On 16 February 2011, Ardent Leisure released the financial results for the six months ending December 2010. These results showed a 6.7% increase in revenue accompanied with a 41.3% increase in attendance to almost 1.5 million people. Ardent Leisure cite the Summer Funomenon promotion to be a reason behind these increases despite unprecedented weather conditions.

== See also ==
- 2011 in amusement parks
