= Blue Lagoon, Queensland =

Former water park at Dreamworld

Blue Lagoon
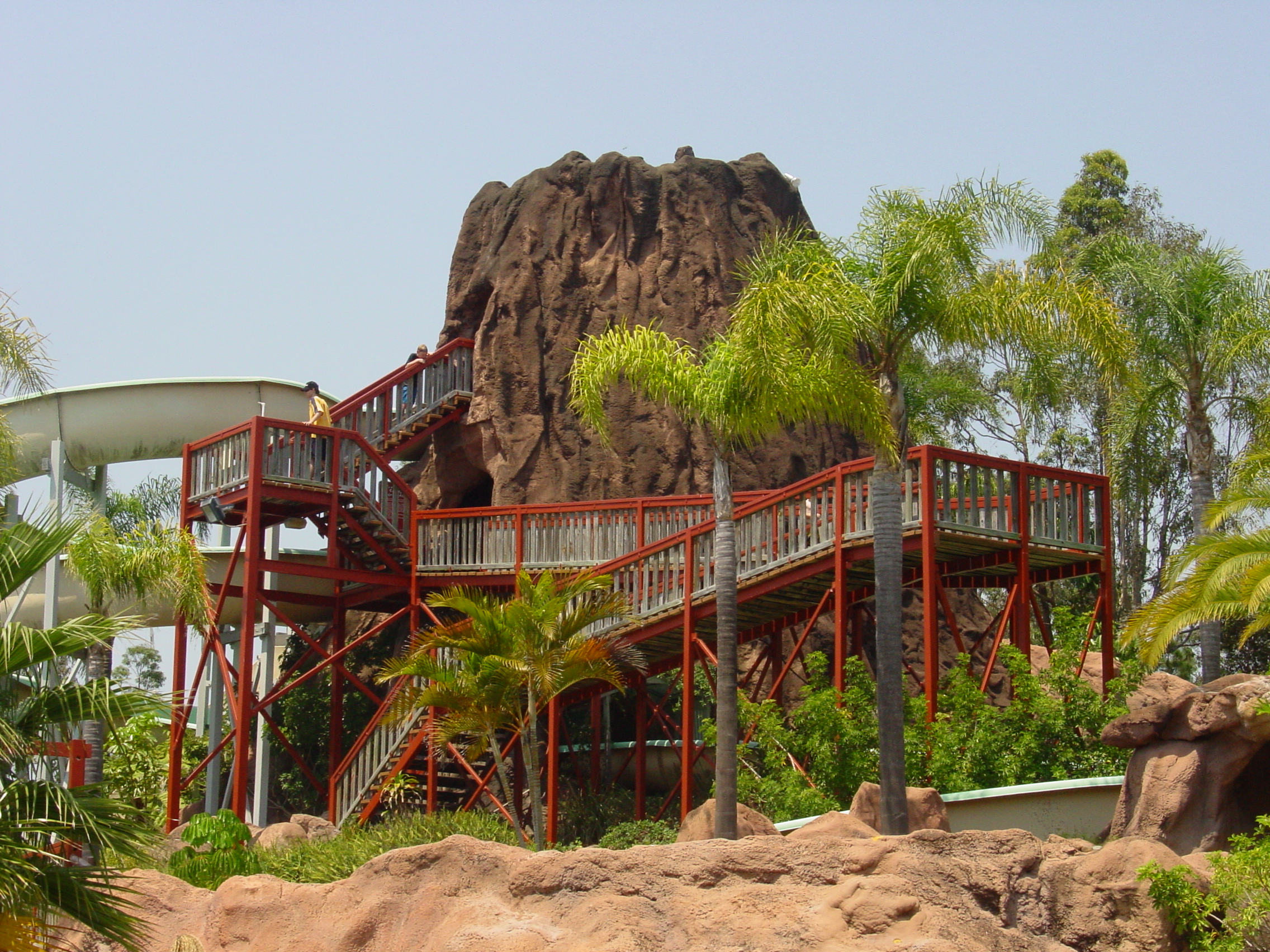
- Looking up at Blue Lagoon's mountain which was the launch area for the three slides.

Dreamworld
- Area: Blue Lagoon
- Coordinates: 27°51′40.9″S 153°18′53.5″E
- Status: Closed
- Opening date: 1983
- Closing date: 2006

Ride statistics
- Attraction type: Water park
- Manufacturer: Dreamworld
- Theme: Tropical lagoon
- Vehicles: 1
- Riders per vehicle: 1
- Slides: 3
- Pools: 2

Blue Lagoon was a themed water park at Dreamworld on the Gold Coast, Queensland. The area consisted of a large mountain which contained three water slides and two swimming pools.

Blue Lagoon opened in 1983 along with Village Green. The area could be accessed via Gold Rush Country and Rocky Hollow. The Dreamworld Studios was located next to the area. Blue Lagoon served as Dreamworld's water park until 2006 when the area was closed months before the opening of WhiteWater World. As of May 2020, the area is currently derelict, with most of the mountain and only one of the three water slides still remaining on site.

== History ==
In 1983, John Longhurst opened Blue Lagoon alongside Village Green. Blue Lagoon opened with three water slides: Aqualoop Flume, Krakatoa's Revenge and Toboggan. The area remained Dreamworld's waterpark for 23 years.

In 2005, Dreamworld announced that a water park would be built next to Dreamworld. In 2006, construction for the new water park began and Blue Lagoon would be closed to the public later that year, months before the opening of WhiteWater World. Two of the three slides were demolished in 2007 however the rest of the area was left derelict to this day. Several of events and scare attractions were used in the area. During the 2010s, most of Dreamworld's derelict buildings and attractions were demolished such as Eureka Mountain Mine Ride and the Sky Link Chairlift. Despite the demolitions, Blue Lagoon was still left inactive and still remained despite Steel Taipan being constructed right next to Blue Lagoon.

== Slides ==
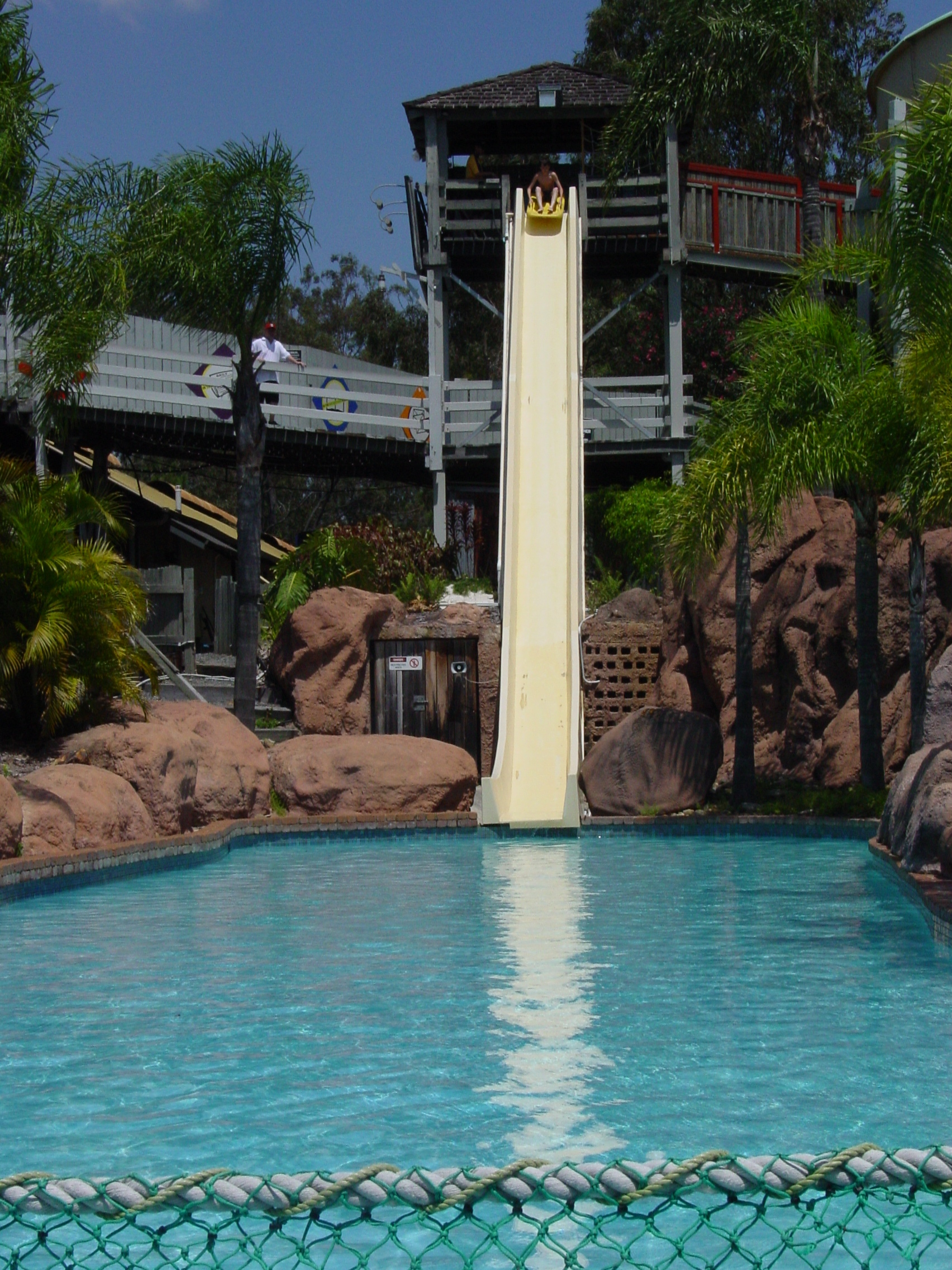
The Toboggan slide in 2002.

=== Aqualoop Flume ===
The Aqualoop Flume slide was a body slide which took riders through several helices down the mountain. The slide also interacted with parts of the Krakatoa's Revenge slide, which also shared the same slide tower. Riders would then splash down into the main pool of Blue Lagoon. The Aqualoop Flume was removed in 2007.

=== Krakatoa’s Revenge ===
Krakatoa's Revenge was a Terrain-based tube slide which took riders through several twists and turns down the mountain. Riders would then splash down into the main pool of Blue Lagoon. Krakatoa's Revenge is the only slide still remaining to this day.

=== Toboggan ===
The Toboggan slide was a steep tube slide which riders sat in a hard plastic toboggan. Riders would plunge down the slide into a pool dedicated to the Toboggan. The Toboggan had its own slide tower on the mountain. The Toboggan was removed in 2007.

== In popular culture ==
Blue Lagoon was featured on the opening sequences of Big Brother Australia in 2001 and 2002.

== See also ==
- WhiteWater World
