= King Claw =

Intamin Gyro Swing at Dreamworld

King Claw (Dreamworld)
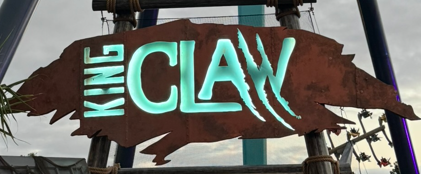

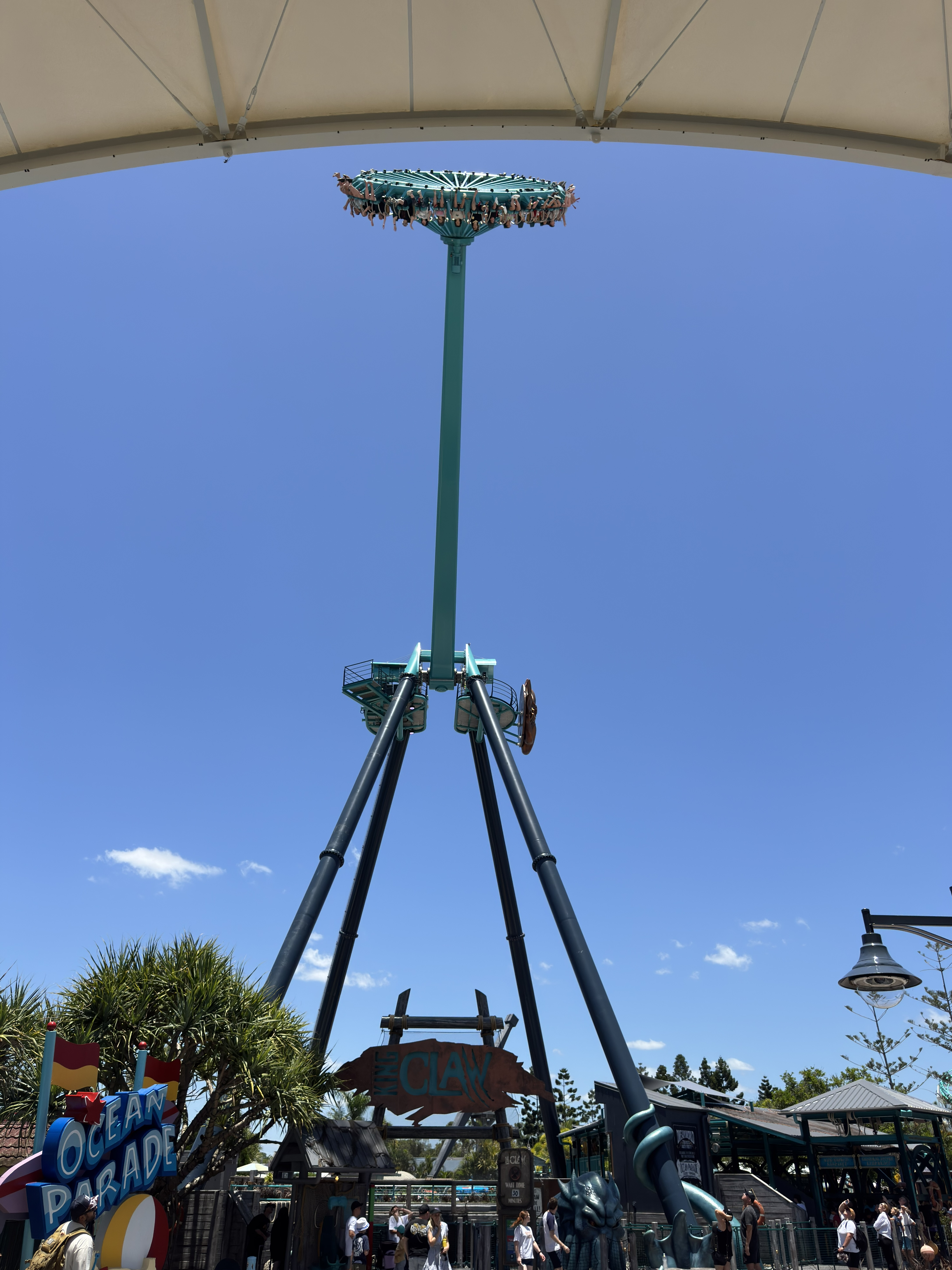
- The King Claw from Main Street

Dreamworld
- Area: Ocean Parade
- Status: Operating
- Opening date: 12 December 2025

Ride statistics
- Attraction type: Gyro Swing
- Manufacturer: Intamin
- Height: 42 m (138 ft)
- Speed: 98 km/h (61 mph)
- Vehicles: 1
- Riders per vehicle: 40

King Claw is a giant pendulum ride at Dreamworld on the Gold Coast, Queensland, Australia. The ride is the largest gyro swing attraction in the Southern Hemisphere.

== History ==
It was announced that the King Claw would replace The Claw (Dreamworld) at the IAAPA Expo Europe in Amsterdam on 25 September 2024. Dreamworld simultaneously revealed marketing material about the announcement. The Claw (Dreamworld) was announced that its closure would be in January 2025.

The replacement of the Claw was in addition to Dreamworld's then existing $55m investment plan announced in 2022 which included developing Kenny and Belinda's Dreamland, the largest dedicated family and children's world in any Gold Coast theme park.

Laing Firth, the designer of the King Claw, celebrated his first concept developed into an attraction, after having researched video games, 20,000 Leagues Under the Sea, the ocean and industry, ultimately giving the ride its own identity.

The Claw was closed after operating for more than 20 years. By 15 July 2025, 16 different shipments had arrived at Dreamworld for the construction of King Claw, mainly from Europe, with the legs, pendulum, and motor of the ride having been installed. Dreamworld's Senior Project Manager Shane Boys told the Gold Coast Bulletin that each leg alone weighs 16 tonnes, the motor weighs 32 tonnes, the pendulum arm weighs 15 tonnes, and that the main structure took a week to erect, which was a record time compared to other similar rides built around the world. Dreamworld needed to lift 122 tonnes of steel into place. Three cranes were used to assemble the columns of King Claw. Mr Boys stated that the next step was the electrical cabling and the hydraulic systems, then Dreamworld would start to put the small detailed pieces on.

King Claw opened on 12 December 2025.

In the Gold Coast Bulletin on 13 December 2025, Mr Yong revealed that the order for the ride was signed three years prior (circa December 2022). At opening there were four Intamin Gyro Swings of this type in the world (including King Claw), but King Claw was the only one in the Southern Hemisphere.

== Characteristics ==
King Claw is an Intamin Gyro Swing, that has a structure which stands 27 metres tall, and swings riders up to 42 metres into the air, which is higher than Steel Taipan's tallest point.

The pendulum swings 120 degrees with each cycle seating up to 40 riders. King Claw reaches a top speed of up to 98 kilometres per hour, and riders receive peak forces of around 4.6 G.

King Claw is the largest gyro swing ride in the Southern Hemisphere, and the first ride in Australia to feature a walk‑through metal detector at the ride entrance, introduced to ensure guests do not carry loose items such as phones or keys onto the ride.

== See also ==
- The Claw (Dreamworld)
- Dreamworld
- Intamin
- List of amusement rides
