= V8 Supercars RedLine =

Racing simulator

Dreamworld
- Area: Ocean Parade
- Coordinates: 27°51′54.51″S 153°18′57.2″E
- Status: Closed
- Soft opening date: 26 December 2008
- Opening date: 18 February 2009
- Closing date: 2019

Ride statistics
- Attraction type: Racing simulator
- Designer: Atomiq
- Theme: V8 Supercars
- Vehicles: 4
- Riders per vehicle: 2
- Duration: 7 minutes (30 minutes for NightDriver)
- Track: Bathurst
- Cost for driver: $10
- Cost for passenger: $5
- Restrictions: 150 cm (59 in) for drivers; 18 kg (40 lb) and above 4 years old (for passengers)
- This is a pay-per-use attraction

V8 Supercars RedLine was a racing simulator based upon Australia's V8 Supercars series. It was an upcharge attraction which would allow up to 4 guests to participate in a 24-car race around Bathurst. Located in the southern portion of Ocean Parade, V8 Supercars RedLine formed part of Dreamworld's marketing initiative, Adrenalin Alley which incorporated the FlowRider and AVPX.

== History ==
On 14 November 2008, Dreamworld announced V8 Supercars RedLine on Australian theme park forum, Parkz. This was followed shortly by the launch of a construction blog at v8supercars.dreamworld.com.au.

Construction of the ride began shortly after the ride's announcement. An existing shed, originally used as part of the Cyclone's theming, was modified and extended to become the home of V8 Supercars RedLine.

The ride was originally scheduled to open on 16 December 2008, however, a number of reasons forced it to be delayed. V8 Supercars RedLine had a soft opening on 26 December 2008. The ride was officially opened on 18 February 2009 with V8 Supercar drivers Cameron McConville, Craig Lowndes, Greg Murphy and Jamie Whincup present for the launch.

== Operation ==
Guests enter the V8 Supercars RedLine building which is located adjacent to the FlowRider and the Cyclone at the southern end of Ocean Parade. Riders must pre-book their session at the booking counter. When it is their session riders will receive a briefing on how to drive the cars as well as a safety spiel.

During normal park operating hours, drivers are required to pay $10 to experience V8 Supercars RedLine. Guests who don't want to drive but still want to experience the ride can purchase a passenger pass for $5. For these prices they get to experience the ride for 7 minutes.

On selected Friday nights, Dreamworld operate V8 Supercars RedLine as NightDriver. For a $20 fee, drivers can have a 30-minute session. Spectators can watch the session for $5.

== Cars ==
V8 Supercars RedLine originally featured 4 replica V8 Supercars. The cars were modeled on those of Craig Lowndes, Greg Murphy, Mark Winterbottom and Cameron McConville in the 2008 V8 Supercars series, with each car fitted with a collision detection system. This translates into mechanical movements. Screens covering 180° vision surround each of the cars. The cars also feature a rear-vision camera. During its latest renovation, the replica cars were ditched in favour of a modern, top-of-the-line Vesaro motion simulator, with upgrades to a sequential gearbox as well as the display screens. The latest iteration features the supported latest rFactor 2 software, to offer a much more dynamic driving experience compared to the older physics simulator.
