= FlowRider (Dreamworld) =

Sheet wave FlowRider attraction

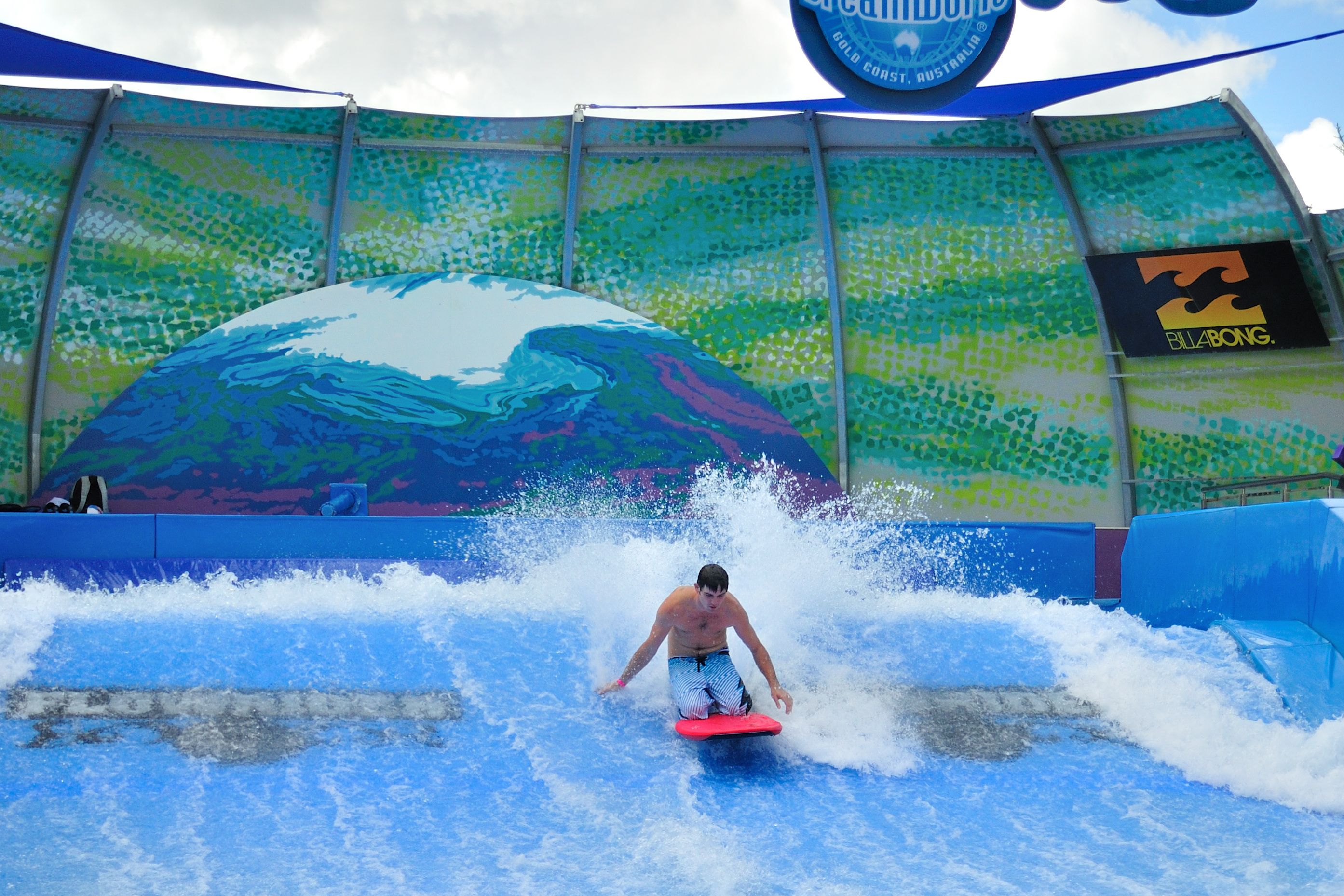

Dreamworld
- Area: Ocean Parade
- Coordinates: 27°51′55″S 153°18′58.17″E
- Status: Closed
- Cost: A$1,500,000
- Soft opening date: 23 June 2006
- Opening date: 24 June 2006
- Closing date: 12 August 2020
- Replaced: Thunderbolt

Ride statistics
- Attraction type: FlowRider
- Manufacturer: Wave Loch
- Designer: Tom Lochtefeld
- Model: FlowRider Double
- Capacity: 16 riders per hour
- Participants per group: 8
- Duration: 30 / 60 minutes (bodyboard/stand-up)
- Height restriction: 110 cm (3 ft 7 in)
- Cost per session: $10 / $20 (bodyboard / stand-up)
- This is a pay-per-use attraction

FlowRider is a sheet wave FlowRider attraction at the Dreamworld amusement park on the Gold Coast, Queensland, Australia.

== History ==
In early 2006 construction began for the FlowRider. It was constructed on part of the site of the former Thunderbolt roller coaster which was removed in 2004. On 23 June 2006, the attraction had its soft opening which was attended by the attraction's designer Tom Lochtefeld as well as several surfers, snowboarders, wakeboarders and skateboarders. The next day, on 24 June 2006, the attraction officially opened to the public. The original Thunderbolt station was converted into a merchandise shop, changing rooms and toilets. It was later redeveloped to provide an internal gate through to WhiteWater World. At the time of opening, it was Australia's first and only FlowRider.

The FlowRider later formed part of the marketing initiative "Adrenalin Alley" which was launched in 2009. It incorporates the after-hours use of the FlowRider, AVPX and V8 Supercars RedLine.

On 12 August 2020, Dreamworld announced that FlowRider along with the Big Red Car Ride were permanently closed. Both rides were operational before the temporary closure of the park due to the COVID-19 pandemic. FlowRider currently sits dormant behind a wall.

== Operations ==
Throughout most of the day at Dreamworld, the FlowRider operates in bodyboard mode. Groups of 8 riders share a 30-minute session on the FlowRider (The wave used to be split in two to allow for 2 riders at a time). There are also separate stand up sessions that run for an hour designed for those who want to use the full FlowRider on a stand-up flowboard.

On selected Friday nights after the park closes, Dreamworld also operates the NightRider. Similar to the stand-up sessions during the day, these sessions run for an hour each and are designed for those who want to use the full FlowRider on a stand-up flowboard.

Current session times are as follows

11:00am – 5:00pm (7 days) – stand up sessions are currently unavailable (as at 8 May 2019)

== Competitions ==
The FlowRider at Dreamworld has also played host to a variety of local, national and international competitions including:

- Zero 2 Hero
- FlowRider Fiesta
- Go with the Flow
- Flow Show
- 2011 Asian Flow Series

== See also ==
- Wave Loch
