= Eureka Mountain Mine Ride =

Former Wild Mouse steel coaster

- Previously known as Los
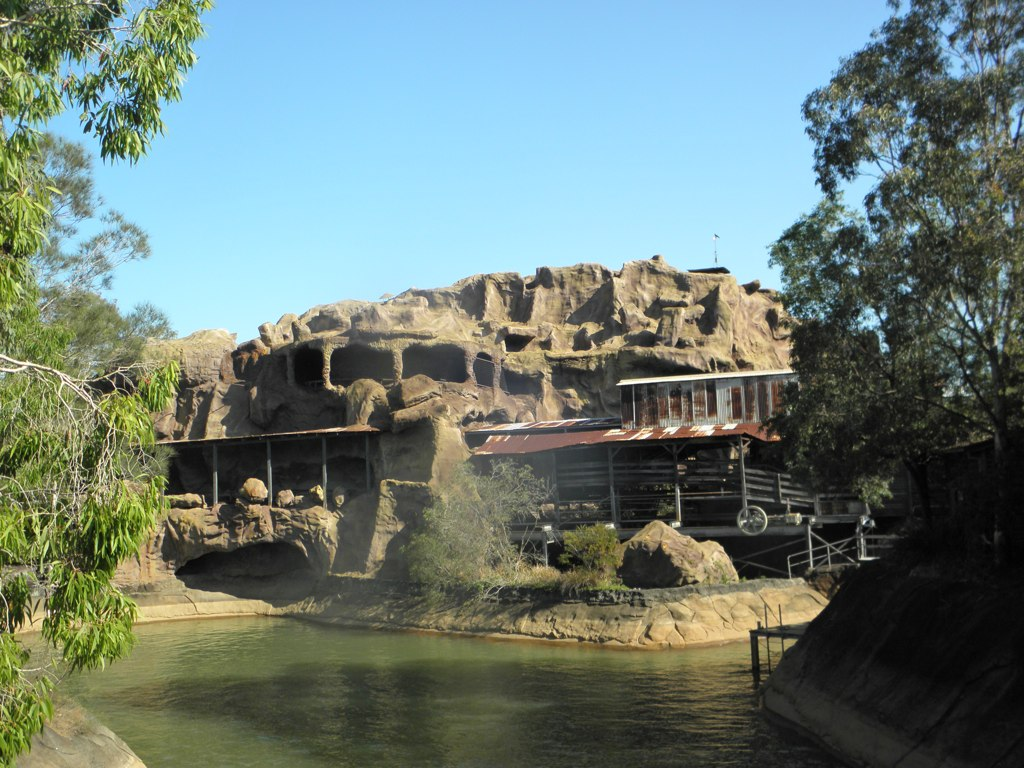
- The Eureka Mountain Mine Ride building.

Dreamworld
- Location: Dreamworld
- Park section: Gold Rush Country
- Coordinates: 27°51′45.5″S 153°18′57″E
- Status: Removed
- Opening date: 11 December 1986
- Closing date: 7 November 2006
- Replaced by: Steel Taipan

General statistics
- Type: Steel – Wild Mouse – Enclosed
- Manufacturer: HyFab
- Lift/launch system: Chain lift hill
- Height: 12 m (39 ft)
- Drop: 7 m (23 ft)
- Length: 300 m (980 ft)
- Speed: 48 km/h (30 mph)
- Inversions: 0
- Duration: 1:10
- Trains: Multiple trains with a single car. Riders are arranged 2 across in 2 rows for a total of 4 riders per train.
- Restraints: Seat belt
- Eureka Mountain Mine Ride at RCDB

Eureka Mountain Mine Ride was a Wild Mouse steel roller coaster located at Dreamworld in Gold Coast, Australia. After closing for maintenance in 2006, the ride remained inactive for 11 years. Following a third-party assessment in December 2017, the decision was made by management for the ride not to reopen again due to the deteriorated state of the track. The remainder of the structure and ride was subsequently demolished within the same month.

== History ==
The Eureka Mountain Mine Ride opened on 11 December 1986 alongside the Thunder River Rapids Ride as part of Dreamworld new land, Gold Rush Country.

On 7 November 2006, the Eureka Mountain Mine Ride closed for maintenance. At the time Dreamworld stated that the ride would be closed temporarily to ensure the safety of all guests. In 2010, Dreamworld stated that the closure of the ride "basically came down to new ride technology, upgraded safety regulations and responding to what the public wanted. Like the old Thunderbolt Rollercoaster, the mine ride served us well for 25 years and was "retired..." to make way for newer computerised attractions like The Claw, The Motorcoaster and AVPX. In Summary - rides have a life span - like a car - it comes to a time when you need to spend a lot of $$ to fix it up so when it is no longer a very popular attraction sometimes it is better to invest in something newer...... ". The ride itself remained standing for 11 years with the queue and entrance transformed to house a couple of carnival-style games.

In late 2017, Dreamworld begun demolishing the mountain which encloses the ride, while preserving the track for a potential reopening of the ride. In December 2017, following careful assessment of the existing ride track by a third party, a Dreamworld spokesperson confirmed that the ride would not be reopened. The remainder of the track was subsequently demolished within the same month.

== Ride ==
Eureka Mountain Mine Ride was manufactured by Brisbane-based company, HyFab. The ride was a Wild Mouse roller coaster enclosed in Eureka Mountain. The ride would begin with guests entering the Eureka Mountain Mine and boarding one of several 4-seater cars. After being pulled up a chain lift hill, guests would be confronted by an animatronic miner who would light a stick of dynamite. After it explodes, the car would take guests through a variety of sharp, hairpin turns and fast, steep drops.

Eureka Mountain Mine Ride originally featured dual stations which allowed two cars to load and unload at the same time. In 2002, the practice of using these two stations was discontinued. In 2004, the ride system was upgraded.

== Potential Reopening ==
Speculation began in early 2015 about the ride's potential reopening. In the previous year, Dreamworld underwent a restoration on the Wipeout and Ocean Parade, as well as repainting The Claw. Some speculated that Eureka Mountain may feature as part of Dreamworld's restoration. Furthermore, water-dummies have been seen in the ride's entrance, and carts have been successfully cycled through the ride. On 10 February 2015, Dreamworld posted on their Facebook page "There is no official % on if this ride can be reopened or what else it could become. It is not off the table but certainly not on the table where we can be putting time frames or percentages on it. Everyone wants it back, and if it is possible there is a chance that one day that could happen."

In late 2017, Dreamworld decided to demolish the mountain's exterior and leave the ride's system to work out whether they can reuse the ride in the near future. Unfortunately, it was later announced that the ride will not be returning, and the remainder of the track has subsequently been demolished.

== See also ==
- Town of Gold Rush
