= Dreamworld (Australia) =

Theme park in Queensland, Australia

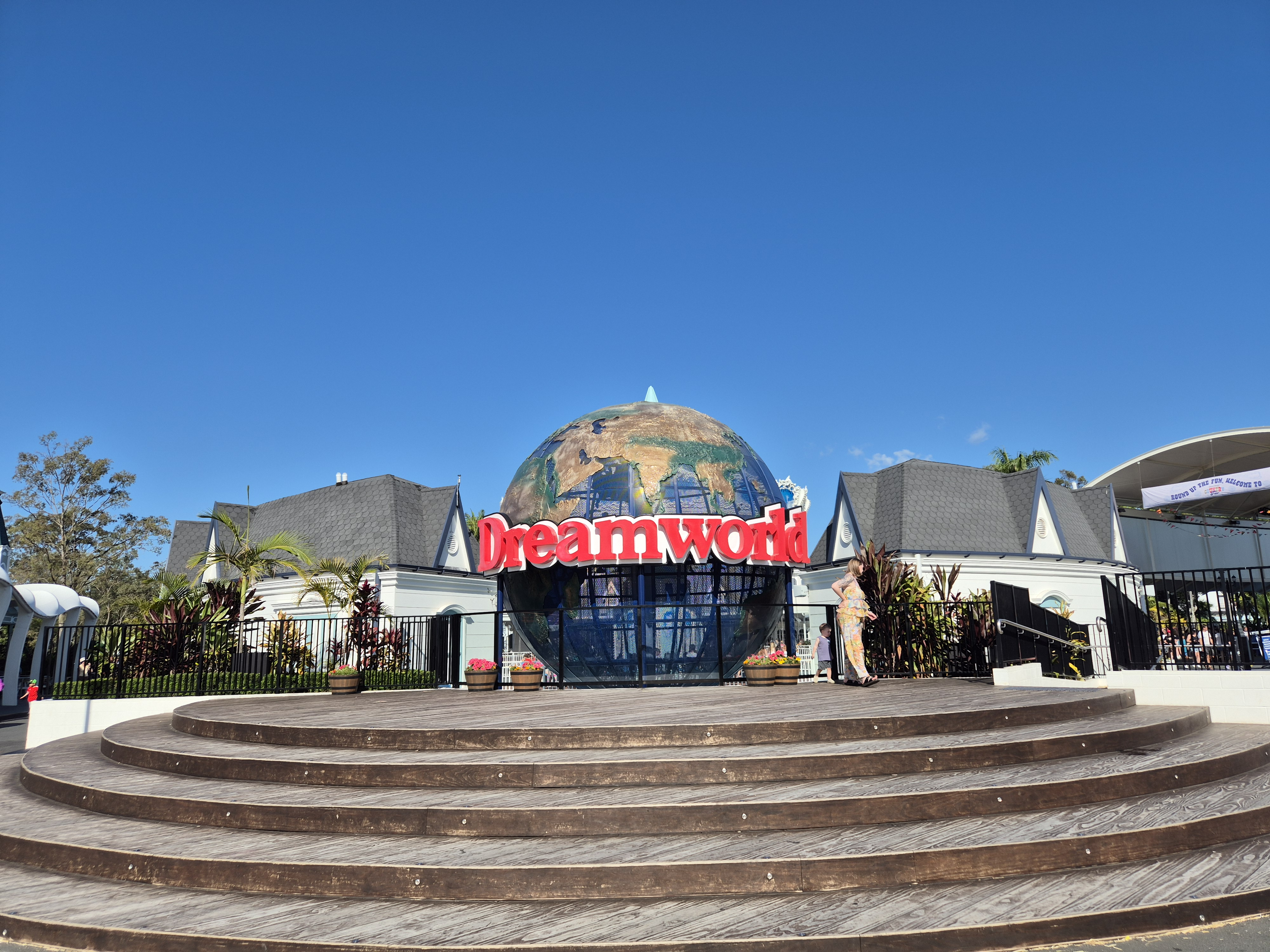
- The park's iconic globe at the entrance of the park.
- Interactive map of Dreamworld
- Location: Coomera, Queensland, Australia
- Coordinates: 27.864°S 153.3158°E
- Status: Operating
- Opened: 15 December 1981; 44 years ago
- Owner: Coast Entertainment
- General manager: Greg Yong (CEO)
- Theme: Australia
- Slogan: All worlds in one
- Operating season: Year-round
- Area: 55.3 ha (137 acres)

Attractions
- Total: 52 (including WhiteWater World)
- Roller coasters: 6
- Website: www.dreamworld.com.au

Dreamworld is a theme park and zoo situated on the Gold Coast in Queensland. It is Australia's largest theme park with over 40 rides and attractions.

Attractions at the park range from thrill rides such as the newly opened King Claw and Serpent Slayer to family and kids attractions such as the Dreamworld Express, Jungle Rush, and Sky Voyager. Among the 40+ attractions includes the world's tallest and fastest drop tower, The Giant Drop; The Gold Coaster, the oldest operating steel roller coaster in Queensland; and Steel Taipan, a triple-launch high-thrills coaster.

The park is made up of several themed lands: Ocean Parade, Kenny and Belinda's Dreamland, Rivertown, Tiger Island, Main Street, Corroboree & Australian Wildlife. These lands have a collection of rides, animal exhibits, shows, food outlets and merchandise shops. In December 2006, Dreamworld expanded its offerings by opening WhiteWater World next door.

Dreamworld has weekly night markets which features food trucks, live music, family entertainment & ticketed events. Dreamworld Night Market entry is $2 or free for children and Dreamworld passholders.

Dreamworld is known for being the location of the Australian Big Brother house filmed at the Dreamworld Studios, since the program began in Australia from 2001 to 2014, and again from 2025.

== History ==
=== Construction and opening ===
Possibly the original Dreamworld logo with a generic log ride hut, paddle steamer, single loop coaster, main entrance building, wooden style coaster and train pictured. Some of the attractions depicted in this logo never existed at the park.

In 1974, John Longhurst, the father of the future Australian water-ski champion and two time Bathurst 1000 winner Tony Longhurst, put his dream of building a theme park into practice and purchased 85 hectares (210 acres) of land beside the Pacific Motorway in Coomera. Longhurst spent two years, working 12-hour days, to excavate what is now known as the Murrissipi River. No expense was spared when Longhurst employed some designers who worked on Disneyland and Walt Disney World to design the park. It was up to a collection of Australian architects to mimic Australian pioneer buildings during construction.

With attractions, Longhurst aimed to satisfy all of the family. Opening day attractions included the IMAX Theatre, a Baldwin Locomotive (now known as the Dreamworld Express), Model T Fords (now known as Vintage Cars), Rocky Hollow Log Ride, Australian Koala Theatre and the Captain Sturt Paddle-wheeler. The theme park was officially opened on 15 December 1981 by the Premier of Queensland of the time, Sir Joh Bjelke-Petersen.

=== 1980s ===
Since then Dreamworld has constantly evolved adding new rides, themed lands and characters. One year after opening, in 1982, a new themed area, Country Fair was opened. The new themed area featured Thunderbolt which opened as the world's longest steel double loop roller coaster. A new themed area known as Gum Tree Gully also opened.

In 1983, two themed areas were opened. Blue Lagoon water park opened with three water slides and several pools. The second themed area was Village Green. Dreamworld also introduced Belinda Brown as the park's third mascot. In 1984 the park began seven-day trading after two years of only being open Thursday through to Tuesday.

In 1986, a new themed area called Gold Rush Country opened featuring Eureka Mountain Mine Ride and Thunder River Rapids Ride. Gold Rush Country was themed around the Australian gold rushes. The same year, Dreamworld opened the Music Bowl (later became Dreamworld Studios).

In 1987, Koala Country opened and in 1989 the Skylink Chairlift opened.

=== 1990s ===
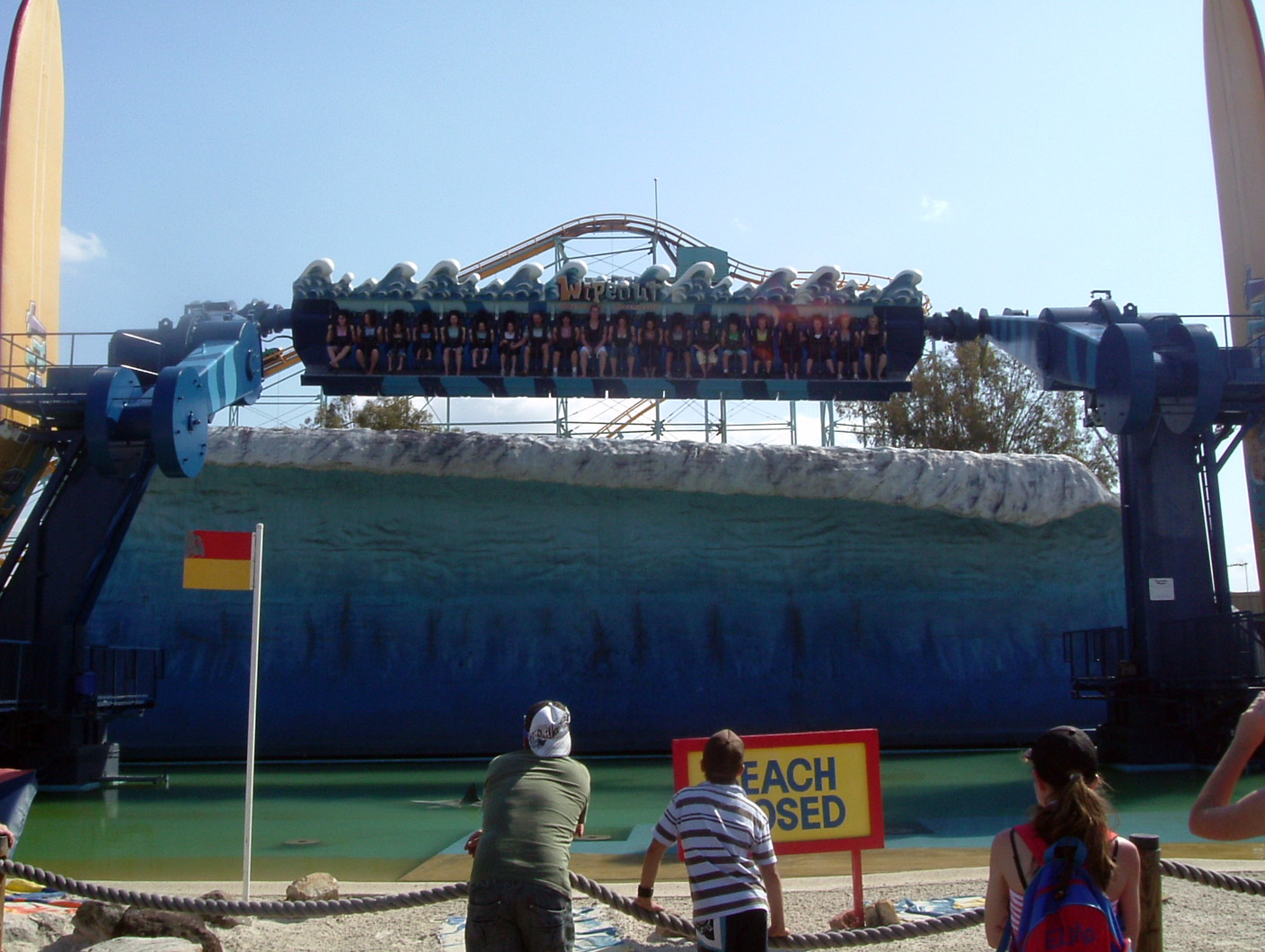
Wipeout was one of Dreamworld's oldest thrill rides

In 1991, to promote the Australian premiere of The Simpsons on Network Ten from 10 February, Dreamworld welcomed the characters of the American TV series. Guests could meet and greet with them as well as see them in the live stage show The Simpsons: Live on Stage, but the characters only appeared twice daily until 30 June.

In 1993, a Waikiki Wave Super Flip named Wipeout opened as part of the new Ocean Parade themed area. In 1995 Tiger Island opened with the Riverwalk Restaurant (now known as the Billabong BBQ and Buffet) opened.

In 1997, Dreamworld opened a slow boat ride named Creature Cruise which they manufactured themselves in Village Oval. Creature Cruise was operation for only a short time. The park also opened the world's tallest and fastest roller coaster Tower of Terror opened. One year later the Giant Drop, the world's tallest freefall ride, was added to the Dreamworld Tower. Also in 1998, four Bengal Tiger cubs were born: Rama, Taj, Sultan and Sita.

In December 1999, Dreamworld added a variety of kids rides in a new themed area called Kennyland. They took up the northern portion of Village Oval and Creature Cruise was converted from a boat ride into a walk-through attraction.

=== 2000s ===
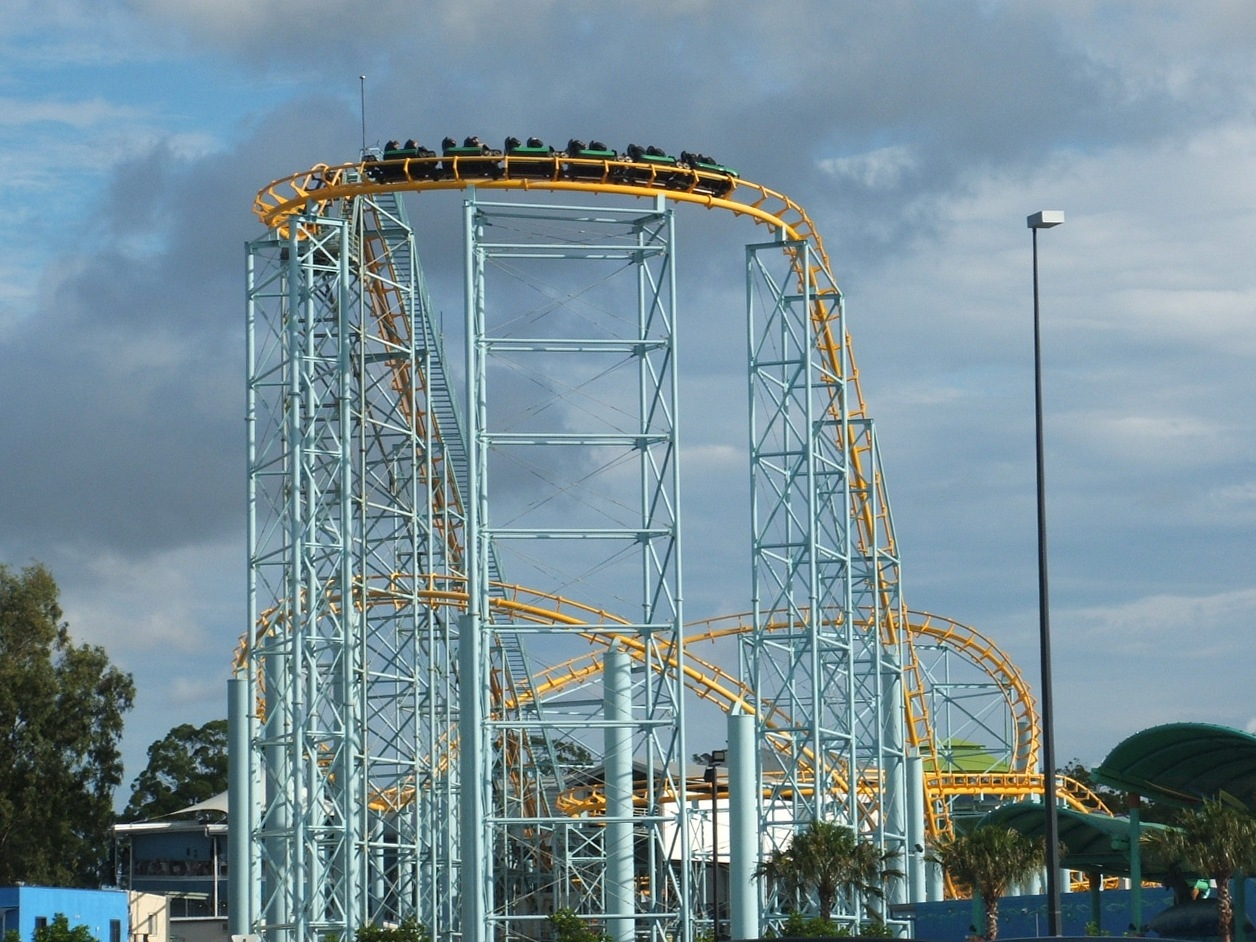
The Cyclone (now The Gold Coaster) roller coaster which was installed in 2001.

In January 2001, the Australian Wildlife Experience opened after the refurbishment and expansion of Koala Country. Later that year in April, Big Brother Australia commenced broadcasting following the redevelopment of Dreamworld's Amphitheatre. In December 2001, the Cyclone opened after its relocation from Luna Park Sydney where it was known as "The Big Dipper". Also in 2001, two new Bengal tigers, Kato and Kaasha, were born in Tiger Island. In 2002, Nickelodeon Central replaced Kennyland and Village Oval to include a wide variety of new and refurbished children's rides.

In 2003, Dreamworld further expanded its wildlife offerings by running after hours 'Sunset Safaris'. In August 2003, Thunderbolt was closed. It was demolished and sold for scrap metal in March 2004. Dreamworld has retained a section of track and at least one train in the park's back-of-house areas. Later that year in September 2004, The Claw opened in Ocean Parade. On 15 March 2005, the Skylink Chairlift, which provided a link between Gold Rush Country and the Australian Wildlife Experience, closed. It remained standing for several months before the wires were removed. The support poles remain standing to this day. Gum Tree Gully closed to make way for the world's first Wiggles World which opened on 10 September 2005.

In 2006, Ardent Leisure shifted its focus to improving its offerings of water attractions. In April, Blue Lagoon was closed due to its planned replacement by WhiteWater World as a separate gated complex. On 24 June, the FlowRider opened in Ocean Parade. On 7 November, the Eureka Mountain Mine Ride closed and it remained standing until 2018 In 2007, two Sumatran Tiger cubs, Indah and Rahni, were born at Tiger Island. Later that year in September, Mick Doohan's Motocoaster opened after the relocation of the Avis Vintage Cars.

On 20 June 2008, SpongeBob FlyPants opened as part of Nickelodeon Central. On 9 June, Tiger Island welcomed the birth of three Sumatran Tiger cubs: Ndari, Jaya and Shanti.

In the middle of 2008, the final series of Australian Big Brother for the Channel 10 Network was produced, leaving the house and studios standing upon completion. In Ocean Parade, V8 Supercars RedLine opened on 26 December near the FlowRider and Cyclone entrance. A few months later, the Vortex was closed and removed to make way for AVPX (Alien vs. Predator vs. You) an indoor laser skirmish attraction which opened on 10 April 2009. Almost exactly one year later in April 2010, the Illuminate Light & Laser Spectacular began seasonal operation in Main Street. In September, the Tower of Terror relaunched as the Tower of Terror II featuring a new, reversed car.

In 2009, a Bell 206 helicopter operating joy flights on behalf of Dreamworld crash-landed in the carpark near the park's main entry. The pilot and four Taiwanese visitors to the park suffered minor injuries in the crash. The pilot was initially praised for avoiding crowded areas of the park, but it was later revealed the crash was a result of mismanagement which led to the helicopter running out of fuel. Dreamworld has not offered helicopter flights since the accident.

=== 2010s ===
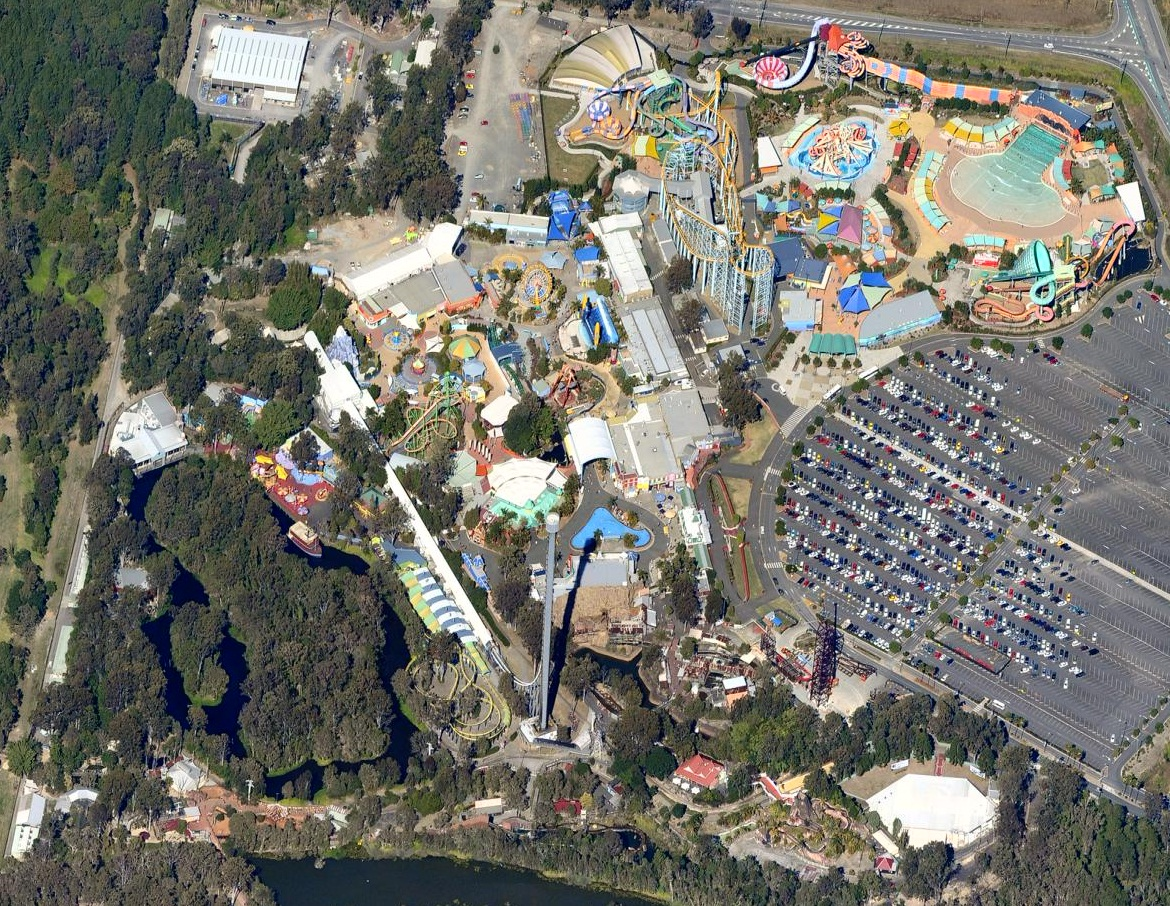
An aerial view of Dreamworld and WhiteWater World in July 2011.

In late 2010, Dreamworld announced that they would begin celebrating their 30th birthday by holding the Summer Funomenon over the summer school holidays. The IMAX Theatre was renovated to become the Dreamworld Cinema. A roof was constructed over Main Street between the entrances for Ocean Parade and Nickelodeon Central. The Marketplace in Main Street was also upgraded. Also a new tiger cub named Pi (pronounced pie) was born.

In 2011, two separate incidents were reported of handlers at Dreamworld's Tiger Island attraction being bitten by a nine-year-old Bengal Tiger and requiring hospitalisation. The park's life sciences manager said that both incidents would be investigated, and the park reviewed its animal handling procedures.

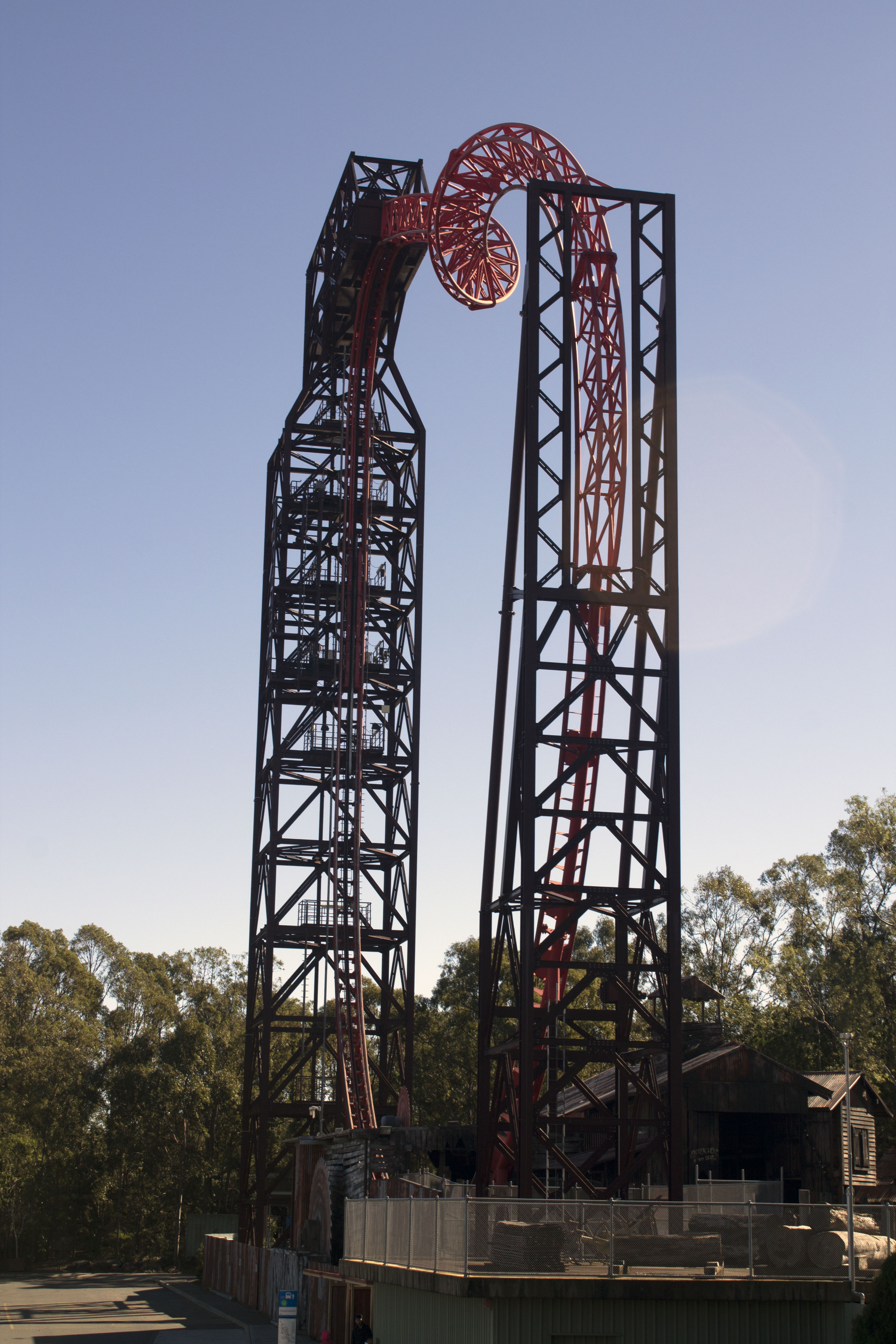
BuzzSaw operated from 2011 to 2021.

On 16 February 2011, Ardent Leisure announced plans to have an Easter promotion where lions would be on temporary exhibition from National Zoo & Aquarium who are renovating their facilities; this was later revealed by Dreamworld to be "The Lair". On 7 April 2011, Dreamworld announced that they would be adding a family thrill ride in June and a major thrill ride in September 2011. On 18 May 2011, the family thrill ride was officially announced to be a Zamperla Disk'O called Shockwave within Ocean Parade. The ride opened on 25 June 2011. By the start of the winter holidays on 25 June 2011, Dreamworld's contract with Nickelodeon had been terminated, thus all of the rides in Nickelodeon Central were renamed to a generic kids theme: Kid's World. On 17 September 2011, Dreamworld opened BuzzSaw – a Maurer Söhne SkyLoop roller coaster. The opening of the ride was timed with the renaming of Gold Rush Country to the Town of Gold Rush.

On 10 November 2011, Dreamworld announced a three-stage plan to incorporate DreamWorks Animation films and characters into its theme park at a cost of $10 million.

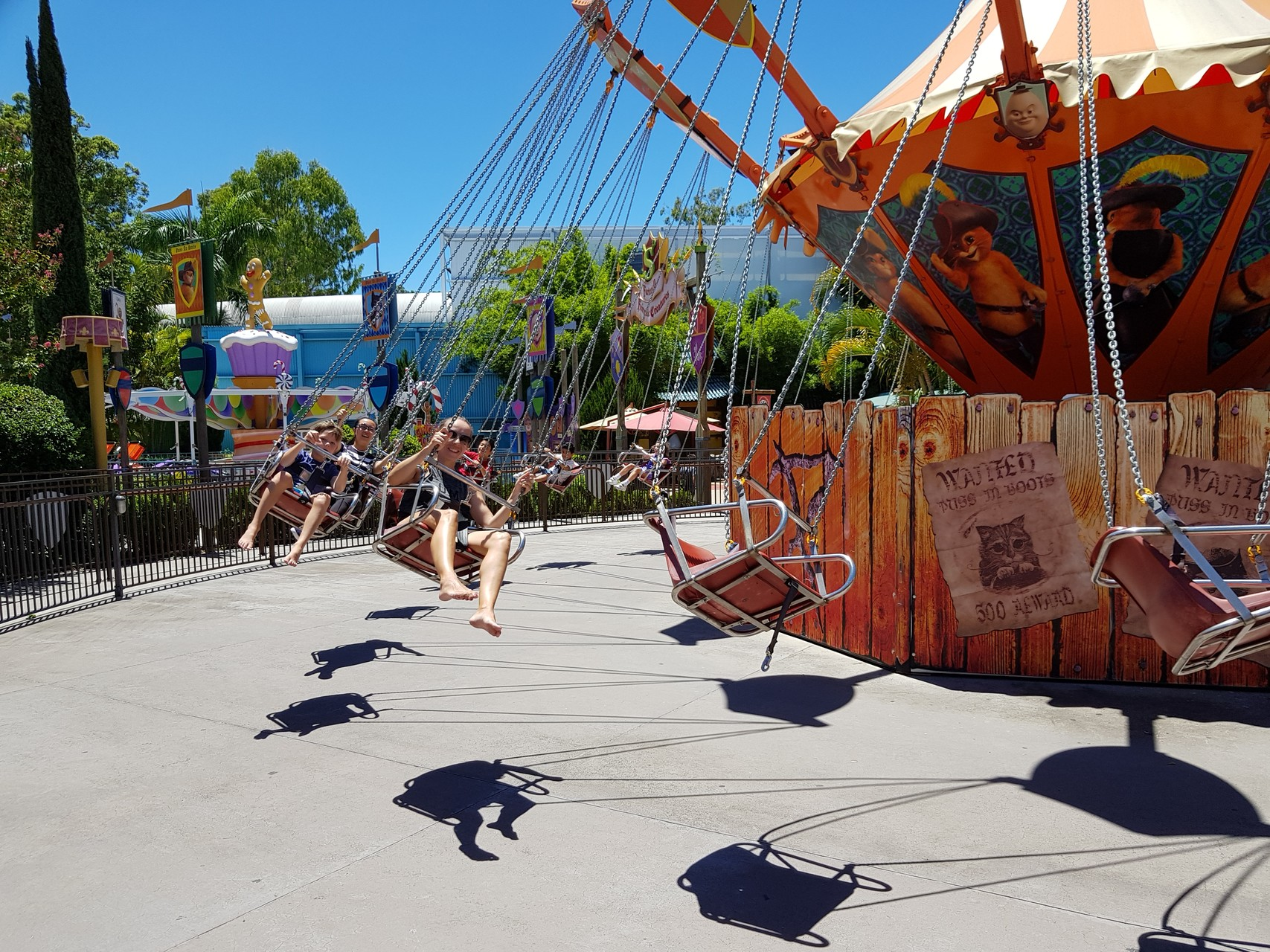
Puss in Boots Sword Swing operated from 1982 to 2023.

The first phase was the temporary summer show, the DreamWorks Holiday Shrektacular. The second phase was the DreamWorks Experience precinct (the retheming of the existing Kid's World area) which opened on 31 March 2012. The final phase was the development of Kung Fu Panda: Land of Awesomeness. This area opened on 21 December 2012 with the park's eighth thrill ride, Pandamonium. In 2012, Dreamworld also saw the return of Big Brother as well as the addition of the Big Red Boat Ride to Wiggles World.

AVPX closed on 31 March 2013. It was replaced with Zombie Evilution on 13 September 2013. Zombie Evilution originally ran as a temporary scare maze until 14 October. On 18 October, the attraction reopened as a laser skirmish attraction with the same theme and backstory.

On 8 November 2013, the park was evacuated when a bushfire came within close proximity. Everyone in the park was evacuated within an hour. Dreamworld announced via Facebook that the park was not under any immediate threat and that back burning to protect it from any damage had started just outside the Big Brother complex. Later that day, Dreamworld again announced via Facebook that the blaze was under control thanks to firefighters and that the park would re-open as normal the next day.

On 28 April 2014, the Reef Diver closed and was subsequently removed. On 20 September, it was replaced by Tail Spin, a Gerstlauer Sky Fly.

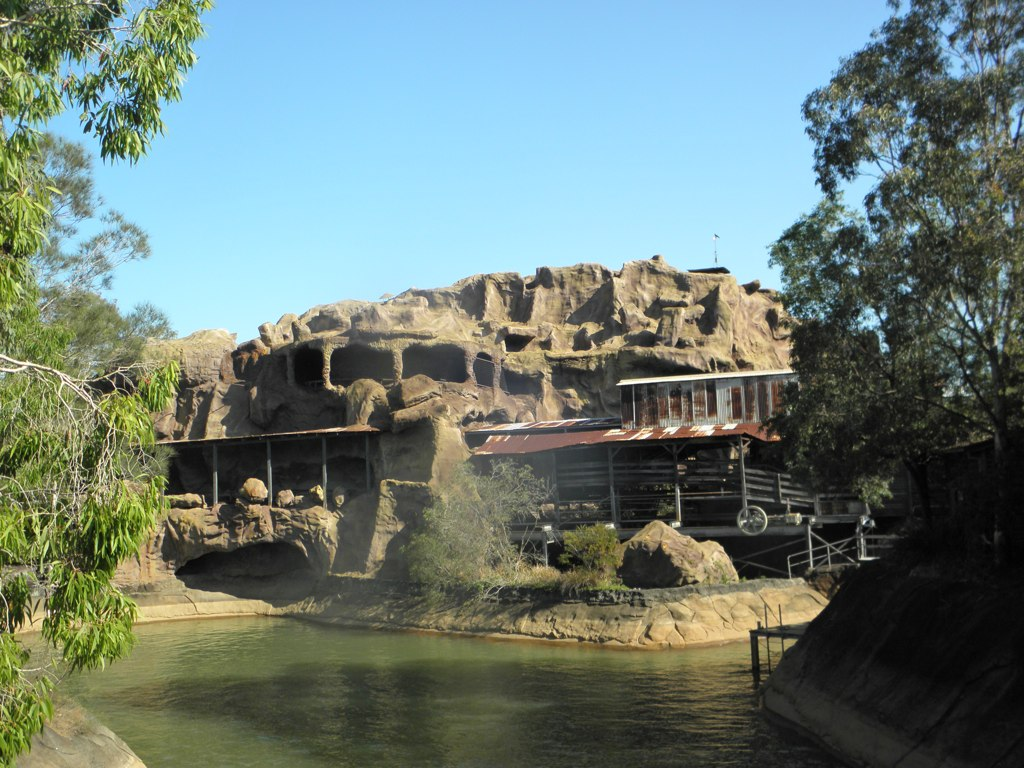
Eureka Mountain Mine Ride was rumoured to be reopened

In early 2015, Dreamworld teased that two new big attractions would be coming to the park in 2015. Throughout the early months of the year, rumours circulated as to the reopening of the Eureka Mountain Mine Ride, however these did not eventuate. Zombie Evilution once again reopened as a scare maze in April. On 12 May, Dreamworld announced that Wiggles World would become a shared kids' world based on the characters of the Australian children's television network, ABC Kids. ABC Kids World opened in June. Dreamworld also revealed plans for an extensive motorsport attraction, which was expected to be a new V8 Supercars attraction to either complement or replace V8 Supercars RedLine. On 26 July, Tiger Cub Kai was born. On 12 October, The Cyclone was closed for refurbishment as part of the Motorsport Precinct, labelled to open 26 December 2015.

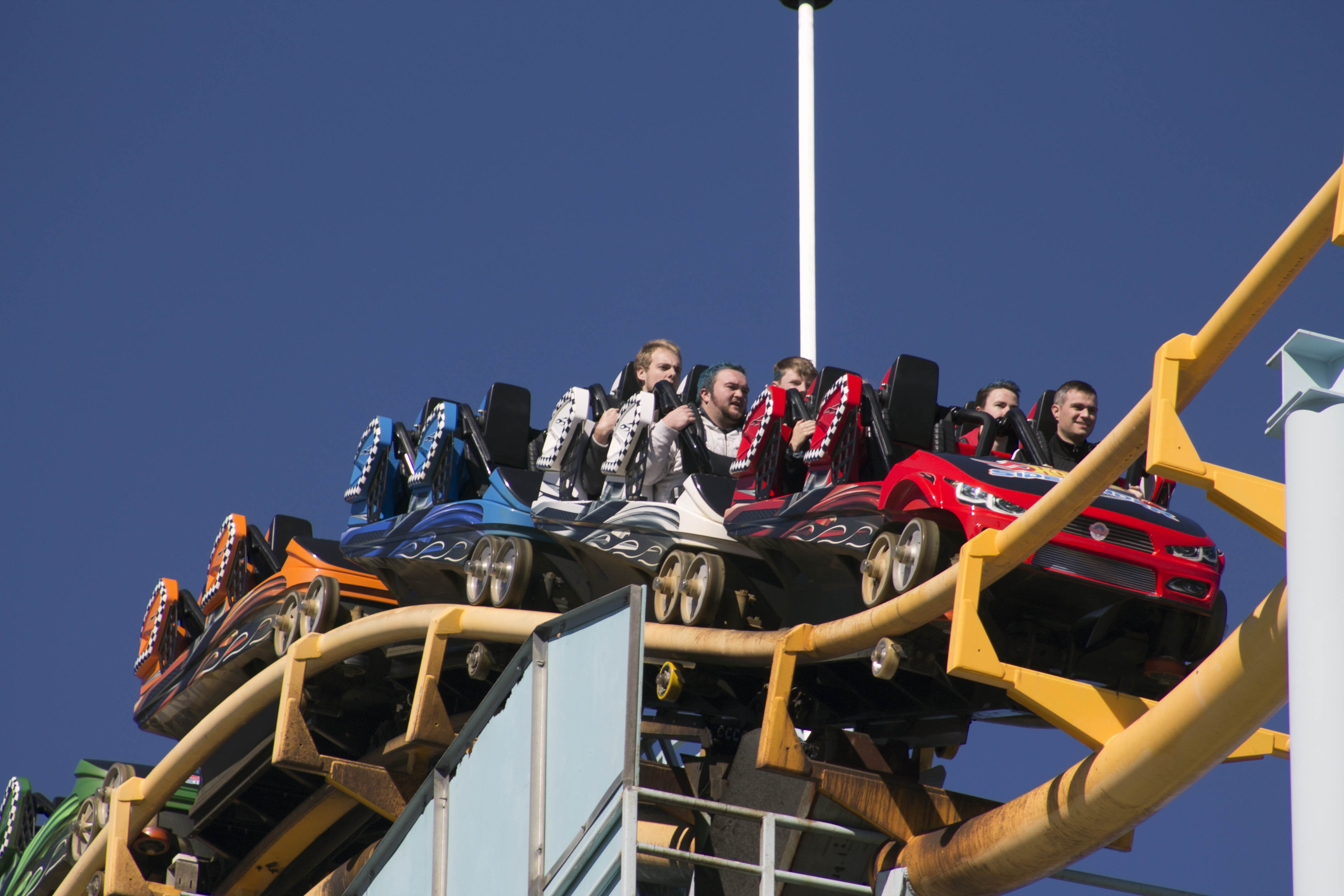
The new trains for the Hot Wheels SideWinder were built by Vekoma.

On 25 October, Dreamworld posted new information on its website regarding the Motorsport Precinct, noting that the Cyclone would be renamed "Hot Wheels SideWinder" after Dreamworld entered into a partnership with Hot Wheels. Dreamworld also revealed that the Precinct will feature the Motorsport Museum (Featuring the 30 Peter Brock V8's) as well as six racing simulators, a new F&B (Food and Beverage) Outlet named Grid Burgers and Sports Bar, as well as a new retail outlet. The Precinct is sponsored by Dunlop, RACQ and Hot Wheels and opened on 26 December 2015.

On 29 November 2015, Two Female Tiger Cubs were born. Later named Akasha and Adira. On 26 December 2015, The Motorsports Experience, including the Brock Museum, Trackside Merchandise Outlet, Grid Burgers Food and Beverage as well as the Hot Wheels SideWinder opened as advertised.

On 27 January 2016, Zombie Evilution closed to the public and would no longer operate as a laser tag arena, the attraction was still, however, utilised as a scare-maze for special events, such as Screamworld. On 9 February, Dreamworld welcomed two female white tiger cubs from Kagoshima City, in Japan. These two cubs were viewable in a quarantine enclosure located in front of the Zombie Evilution attraction. On 29 February, Tiger Island closed for refurbishment, the tiger cubs were still viewable in a new Tiger Cub Kindy area, located in Ocean Parade. Tiger Island reopened on 18 September 2016 and Cub Kindy was moved back to Tiger Island.

In April 2016, a man fell out of the log ride when he stood up mid-ride. He was then run over by two more logs, suffering cuts to his head and almost drowning. The ride was closed for two days after while it was investigated by Queensland authorities. In October 2016, Kelly's Showdown and Jack's Watering Hole were permanently closed after most of the Gold Rush Country was blocked off to the public due to a fatal accident.

In October 2016, a malfunction of the Thunder River Rapids Ride resulted in the deaths of four park patrons. Because of that tragedy, the ride was permanently closed and demolished. Ardent Leisure was fined $3.6 million for its breaches of health and safety laws.

In March 2019, Dreamworld announced that Wipeout, the park's oldest thrill ride, would be retired and dismantled, and will not re-open from its maintenance period. It was replaced with a shaded seating space for guests.

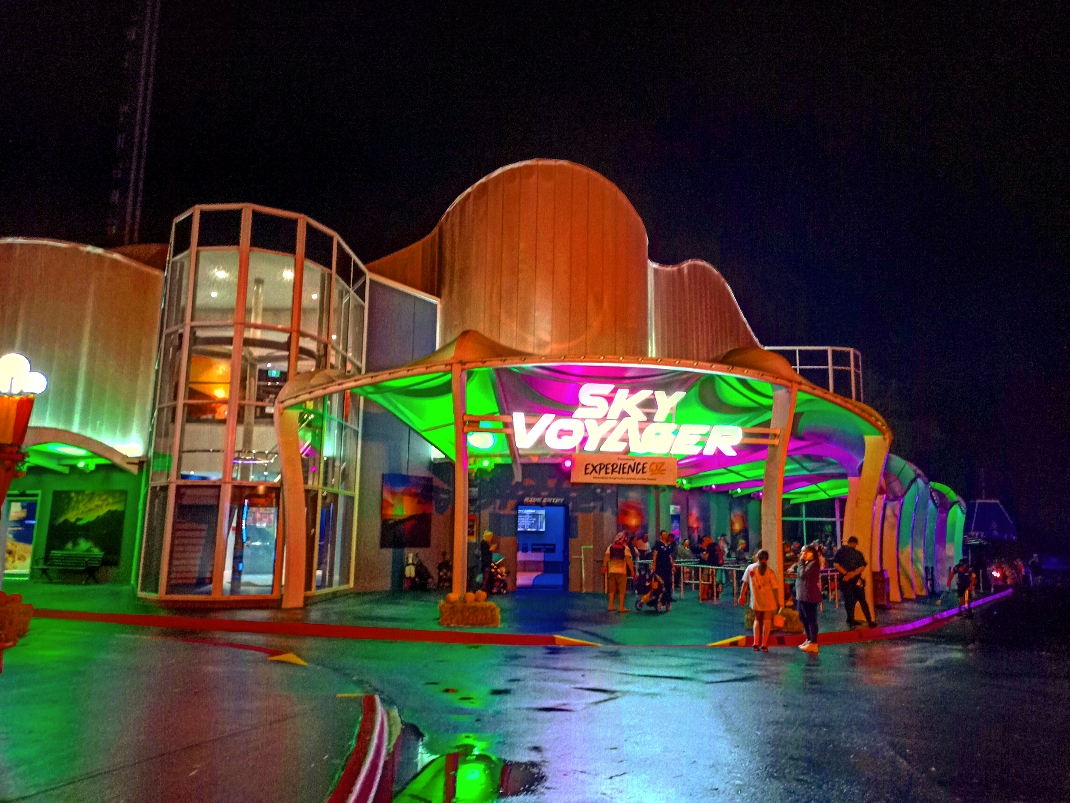
Sky Voyager at night in 2020

At a shareholders conference on 23 August 2019, Ardent Leisure confirmed that the Sky Voyager "flying theatre" simulator ride would open to the public that day. The $17-million Sky Voyager was built in partnership with Brogent Technologies on the site of the former Dreamworld Cinema. It was originally scheduled to open in late 2018, but was delayed due to issues with design registration. During the conference, Ardent further committed to a $50-million investment in their Dreamworld and WhiteWater World properties over the coming three to five years. A $30-million launched roller coaster built by Mack Rides was scheduled to begin construction in early 2020. The coaster's layout would be based on Europa-Park's Blue Fire coaster. A semi-shuttle multi-launch system would be used; a transfer-track will transport riders to the launch track, where the train is launched forwards, then backwards up a vertical spike, then forwards again to complete the track's layout. The coaster features 1,200 m (3,937 ft) of track, a top speed of 105 km/h (65 mph), maximum height of 38 m (124 ft), and four inversions. In addition, the last row of each train would feature backwards-facing spinning cars. The park also confirmed that ABC Kids World would receive a multi-million dollar revamp, with confirmation of a new ride to come and further details to be announced at a later date.

On 22 June 2019, six children were arrested after they burnt down the Big Brother house. The children were found at Coomera railway station shortly after the arson. Two of the children were charged with vandalism. The house was completely destroyed and it was demolished along with the Dreamworld Studios shortly after. The wind that day blew the smoke away from the park so the park did not need to evacuate and nobody was injured.

Just months after the closure of Wipeout, the park announced on 25 October 2019, that the Tower of Terror ll would cease operation on 3 November of the same year. The park cited "focusing our investment on the future and delivering new, world-class attractions for you to enjoy" as the reason for closing the attraction. The park confirmed that The Giant Drop will continue to operate as normal, with the Tower of Terror II track being removed from the Dreamworld Tower structure over time. The press release also included confirmation that a new thrill ride would be announced sometime in the next year as the park continued forward with their multi-million dollar expansion.

=== 2020–present ===
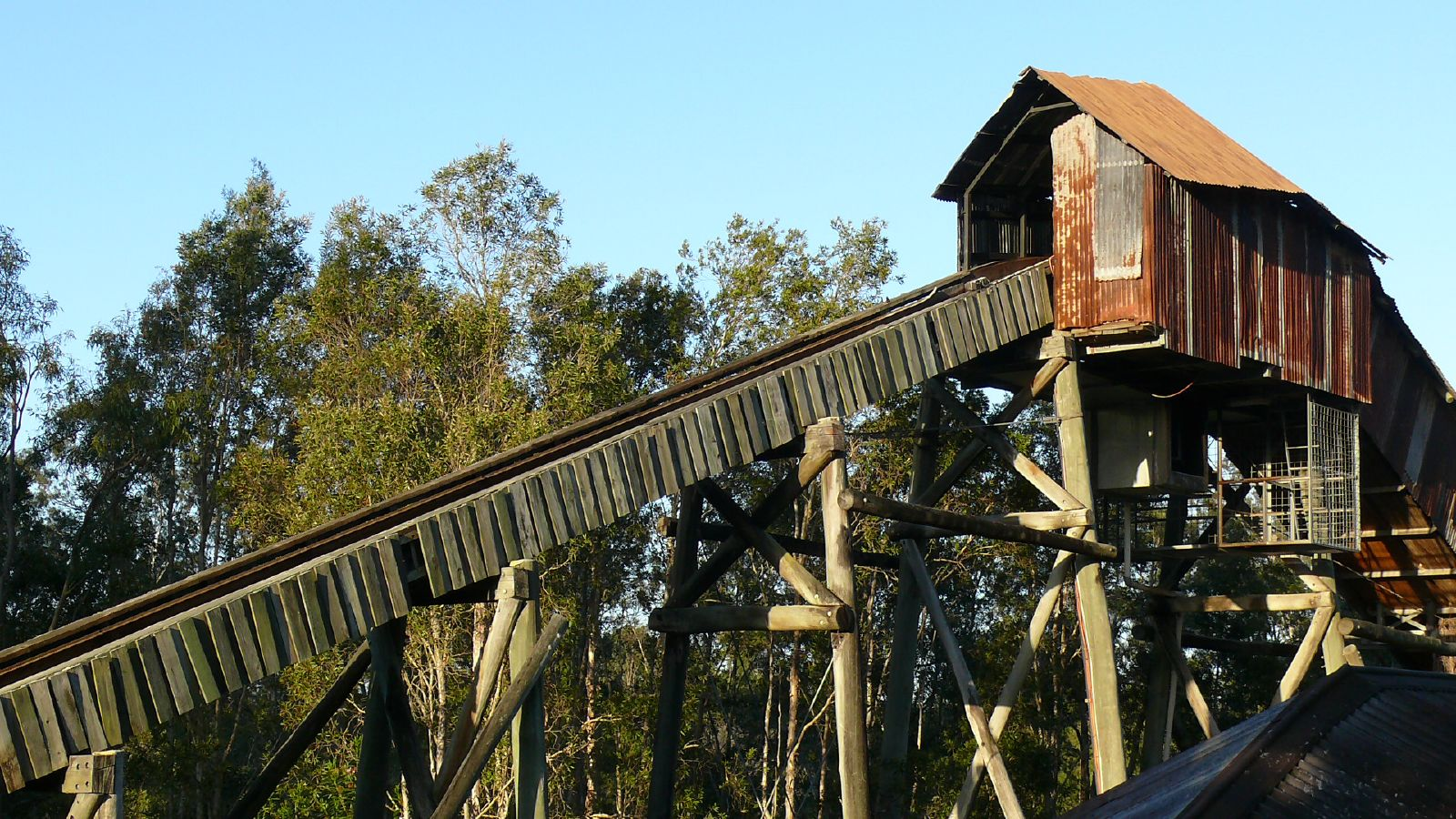
The Rocky Hollow Log Ride was the only remaining original opening day attraction that was still in the original form.

On 7 February 2020, Dreamworld Management announced that the Rocky Hollow Log Ride had been retired from service after 38 years of operation. The following was put out by Dreamworld:

"In order to continue Dreamworld's journey as Australia's biggest and best theme park, the Dreamworld team has made the decision to retire the Rocky Hollow Log Ride, which opened 38 years ago on 15 December 1981. Dreamworld guests should be assured that this decision to not reopen the ride following its recent scheduled maintenance has been made to allow us to continue developing new experiences for guests while taking proactive steps to deliver a new generation of rides."

Dreamworld also announced a refurbishment of the Hot Wheels SideWinder coaster (renamed to The Gold Coaster) and an upgrade to ABC Kids World which includes a new ride.

On 22 March 2020, Dreamworld announced that they would temporarily cease operations for both Dreamworld and WhiteWater World due to the ongoing COVID-19 pandemic. Two days later, Dreamworld announced it had donated 755 kilograms (1,664 lb) of food to OzHarvest.

Over a month later, on 27 April 2020, supports for the new roller coaster, announced in August 2019, started arriving at the Dreamworld carpark. Roller coaster tracks started arriving on 2 June 2020, however no land works had been done during the parks closure.

The Play School Art Room was removed from Dreamworld's website and the attraction was removed, with the exception of the online park map on 17 June.

On 12 August 2020, Dreamworld announced the reopening dates for the park as 16 September 2020. Dreamworld also announced that the majority of the Corroboree area was going to be temporarily closed and that FlowRider and the Big Red Car were going to be permanently closed after 14 years. The park removed indoor seating and reconfigured queue lines to allow for social distancing.

In November 2020, Dreamworld announced the name for their currently under construction roller coaster that took up the land that was once occupied by the Thunder River Rapids Ride. The ride, named Steel Taipan, is a Mack Rides Blue Fire clone with a shuttle launch, vertical twisted spike and spinning rear seat. Steel Taipan officially opened on 15 December 2021.

On 17 July 2021, in an email to pass holders, Dreamworld announced that BuzzSaw would be retired after 31 August 2021. The ride was the 13th attraction to be closed since October 2016. The attraction was refurbished and relocated to Gumbaya World in Victoria as Project Zero.

Dreamworld also announced that the Dreamworld Express would be receiving new train carriages. The refurbished attraction reopened in July 2022, with a reduced track layout and reversed direction of travel. The train now runs clockwise instead of anti-clockwise, with two stations (Central Park Station and Corroborree Station) instead of four. The previous track loop around the Blue Lagoon site has been removed. The Station platforms were also raised to allow for wheelchair users to be able to access al the train carriages with ease.

In April 2022, The Giant Drop closed for refurbishment and repainting of the Dreamworld Tower. The attraction reopened on 24 June 2023. On 24 November, Dreamworld announced a rebranding of the DreamWorks Experience and ABC Kids World themed area into Kenny and Belinda's Dreamland with rebranded and refurbished attractions as well as new attractions. Also, a new chair swing ride called The Dreamworld Flyer was announced for Main Street.

In late 2022 Dreamworld CEO Greg Yong announced the A$50million redevelopment of ABC Kids world & Wiggles world, The new area is to be called Rivertown which is a nod to Dreamworld's past. The area opened in December 2024 featuring the most heavily themed ride in the country "Jungle Rush" roller coaster & "Murrissippi Motors". The land features Australia's largest & most heavily themed restaurant "Jane's Rivertown Restaurant".

In September 2024 Dreamworld announced that The Claw would be closing in January 2025 to be replaced by "King Claw". Standing at 27 metres tall, King Claw will be more than 50% taller than The Claw, reach speeds more than 50% faster and have a swing height taller than the highest peak of the park’s largest rollercoaster, Steel Taipan. It will be built by intamin who also manufactured the original Claw.

In December 2024 Dreamworld officially opened the A$55million Rivertown precinct. CEO Greg Yong invited Michelle Doyle, who is Dreamworld's longest serving employee to cut the ribbon alongside other dignitaries. The precinct includes the Jungle Rush rollercoaster, Murrissippi Motors, which is a refurbished Vintage Car Adventure, and the rethemed Billabong Buffet which is now called Jane's Rivertown Restaurant. The precinct is the most heavily themed and expensive addition to Dreamworld since the parks opening. The precinct features hundreds of theming pieces, custom music, theatrical lighting, a former RAAF DHC-4 Caribou aircraft, multiple old vehicles, and hundreds of new plants & trees.

On 27 July 2025, it was announced that the Big Brother House would return to Dreamworld for the return to Channel 10, continuing its second revival, which started on Seven in 2020.

In September 2025, Dreamworld partnered with Australian Geographic opening the WILD with Australian Geographic precinct, which revamped the former Dreamworld Corroboree area. Upgrades included an improved enclosure for its wedge-tailed eagle, and an ongoing development of a Lumholtz’s tree-kangaroo enclosure. In addition, a multi-screen experience called "Australian Geographic Our Country" has been added to the precinct.

=== Park timeline ===
Park timeline
- 1974: Dreamworld's creator, John Longhurst, purchased 58 hectares of land in Coomera.
- 1981: Dreamworld opens to the public with the Captain Sturt Paddlewheeler, IMAX Theatre (later Dreamworld Cinemas), Cannonball Express (now Dreamworld Express), Rocky Hollow Log Ride and Model T Fords (now Vintage Car Adventure)
- 1982: Grand Prix, Red Baron (later Dora the Explorer's Sea Planes), Thunderbolt and Zumer (later Soaring Swing) open along with the Country Fair themed area.
- 1983: The Blue Lagoon water park opens along with the Village Oval themed area and Avalanche, Bumper Bowl (now Deep Sea Dodgems), Carousel (now the Bananas in Pyjamas Carousel), Enterprise (later Reef Diver), Game Site, Little Puff and Roulette (later Stingray).
- 1984: 7-day trading began.
- 1986: Gold Rush Country opens with the Eureka Mountain Mine Ride and Thunder River Rapids Ride along with the Dreamworld Studios.
- 1987: Koala Country opens along with the Skyline Chairlift.
- 1991: Dreamworld celebrates 10 years of operation.
- 1992: Grand Prix is decommissioned.
- 1993: Ocean Parade opens with the Wipeout.
- 1995: Tiger Island themed area opens.
- 1996: Little Puff is decommissioned.
- 1997: Creature Cruise and Tower of Terror (later Tower of Terror II) opens.
- 1998: The Giant Drop opens.
- 1999: Kennyland opens with Adventure Trails, Dream Copters (now Big Red Plane), Kenny's Cars and Wild Wheels.
- 2000: Creature Cruise is decommissioned.
- 2001: Australian Wildlife Experience (now Dreamworld Corroboree) opens along with Cyclone (now The Gold Coaster) and The Mummy Returns scare attraction. Dreamworld celebrates 29 years of operation. Big Brother Australia starts production at the amphitheatre with the house located nearby.
- 2002: Nickelodeon Central opens with Rugrats Runaway Reptar (now Kenny's Forest Flyer), Wild Thornberry's Rainforest Rampage (now Belinda's Treehouse), and the Slime Bowl (now the Dreamworld Theatre). Adventure Trails, Kenny's Car, Wild Wheels and a temporary kids Ferris wheel are decommissioned.
- 2003: The Sunset Safari experience opens. Thunderbolt is decommissioned.
- 2004: The Claw and Farmyard Friends opens. Fright Night (now Happy Halloween) event is inaugurated.
- 2005: Wiggles World (later ABC Kids World) opens with the Big Red Car Ride, Fun Spot (later ABC Kids World Fun Spot) and SS Feathersword (later Giggle and Hoot's Pirate Ship). Gum Tree Gully and Skylink Chair Lift are decommissioned.
- 2006: FlowRider and WhiteWater World opens. Eureka Mountain Mine Ride is decommissioned.
- 2007: Mick Doohan's Motocoaster (now Motocoaster) opens.
- 2008: SpongeBob FlyPants (now Humpty-Go-Round) and V8 Supercars RedLine opens. Big Brother Australia ceases production.
- 2009: Vortex was decommissioned and replaced with AVPX. Farmyard Friends was also decommissioned and replaced with the Dreamworld Woolshed.
- 2010: The IMAX Theatre and Tower of Terror refurbished to become the Dreamworld Cinema and Tower of Terror II respectively. Dora the Explorer's Sea Planes was decommissioned.
- 2011: As part of Dreamworld's 30th Birthday, BuzzSaw, Shockwave and The Lair opens. Nickelodeon Central is replaced by the DreamWorks Experience themed area.
- 2012: Avalanche is decommissioned for Pandamonium (now Serpent Slayer). Captain Sturt Paddle Wheeler and Stingray were also decommissioned. Big Brother Australia resumes production at the park for the second time.
- 2013: AVPX was decommissioned and replaced by Zombie Evilution.
- 2014: Reef Diver was decommissioned and replaced by Tail Spin. Big Brother Australia ends its tenure for the second time.
- 2015: Motorsports Experience opens with Brock's Garage, new V8 Super Car RedLine and Hot Wheels SideWinder (previously Cyclone).
- 2016: The Ride Express virtual queueing system is introduced. A man was seriously injured on the Rocky Hollow Log Ride. Four riders were killed on Thunder River Rapids Ride. Thunder River Rapids Ride was decommissioned.
- 2017: Tiger Island Up Close Experience opens along with Australia's first LEGO Store. The Park after Dark event was inaugurated.
- 2018: Trolls Village opened and Rocky Hollow Log Ride reopened. Zombie Evilution and the Dreamworld Cinema are decommissioned.
- 2019: Kickback Cove and Sky Voyager open. Giggle and Hoot Hop n Hoot, Tower of Terror II, Trolls Village, V8 Supercars RedLine and Wipeout are decommissioned. Winterfest was inaugurated while Happy Halloween returned after 15 years.
- 2020: Hot Wheels Sidewinder was refurbished and became The Gold Coaster. Big Red Car Ride, FlowRider and Rocky Hollow Log Ride are decommissioned. The park was closed for 6 months due to the COVID-19 pandemic.
- 2021: BuzzSaw was decommissioned. Steel Taipan opens replacing the Thunder River Rapids Ride and Spring Country Fair was inaugurated.
- 2022: Street Food Festival was inaugurated. The Giant Drop and Dreamworld Express rides are refurbished. Dreamworld Parents Centre was inaugurated. Rivertown project is Announced.
- 2023: DreamWorks Experience is replaced by Kenny and Belinda's Dreamland. Soaring Swing was decommissioned and replaced by the Big Red Boat Coaster. Seabed Splash and the Dreamworld Flyer open. ABC Kids World closes.
- 2024: A spinning seat is added to both Steel Taipan trains. Rivertown opens with Jungle Rush, Murrissippi Motors & Jane's Rivertown Restaurant. The Claw's replacement "King Claw" is announced.
- 2025: King Claw opens. Big Brother Australia returns for the third time to resume second revival after a year off air.
- Late 2025: King Claw goes viral after opening but days before it opened King claw had a malfunction where it did a half swing and suddenly slowed down

== Events ==
Dreamworld runs several of annual and special events throughout the year and they also offer private event functions where groups can hire one of the parks event venues during the after hours.

=== Current events ===
- Happy Halloween is an annual halloween event that is held in late October. The event runs after the park hours at night with all the rides and attractions operating. A giant trick or treating event is present along with performances and special food and beverages outlets available.
- Park After Dark is a night time event that is held several times through the year. The event runs after the park has closed. All rides will be operating along with entertainments and special food and beverages outlets.
- Spring County Fair is an annual spring themed event first inaugurated in 2021. Unlike other events, the event is only held during the day. Farm animals are brought in during the event along with live acoustic music and special food and beverages outlets.
- Street Food Festival is an annual food event at Dreamworld. The event offers food and beverage options in pop-up stalls, food trucks and existing outlets. The menu offers special limited time American and Asian food. Special entertainment is also offered during the event.
- Winterfest is an annual winter themed event first inaugurated in 2019. The event is held during the day and night similar to Park After Dark. All rides and attractions are also operational. In addition, the annual Ice Maze, Toboggan Slide and Ice Skating Rink are also available. There are also special food and beverages outlets through the park.

== Park layout ==
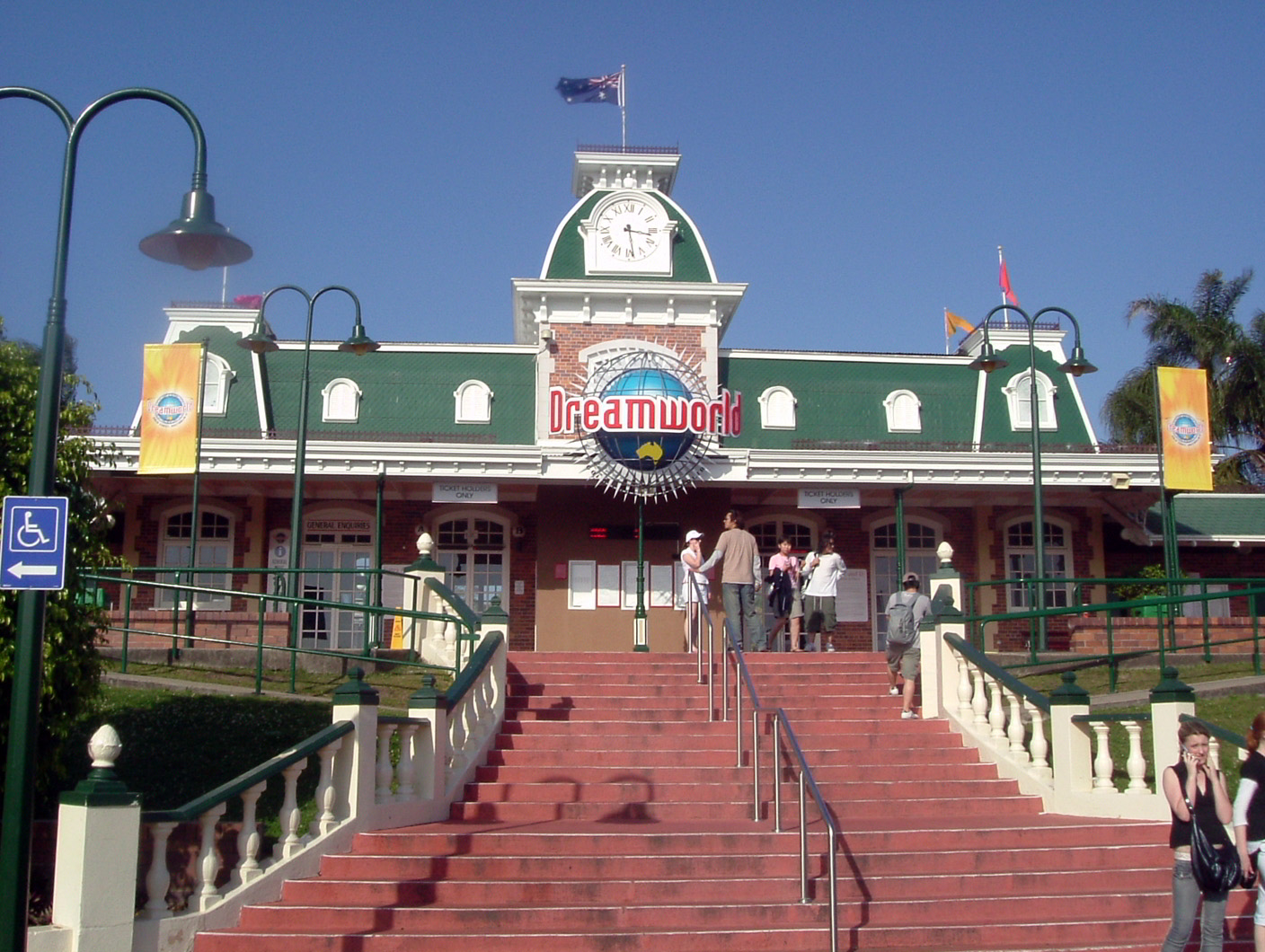
Dreamworld's entrance

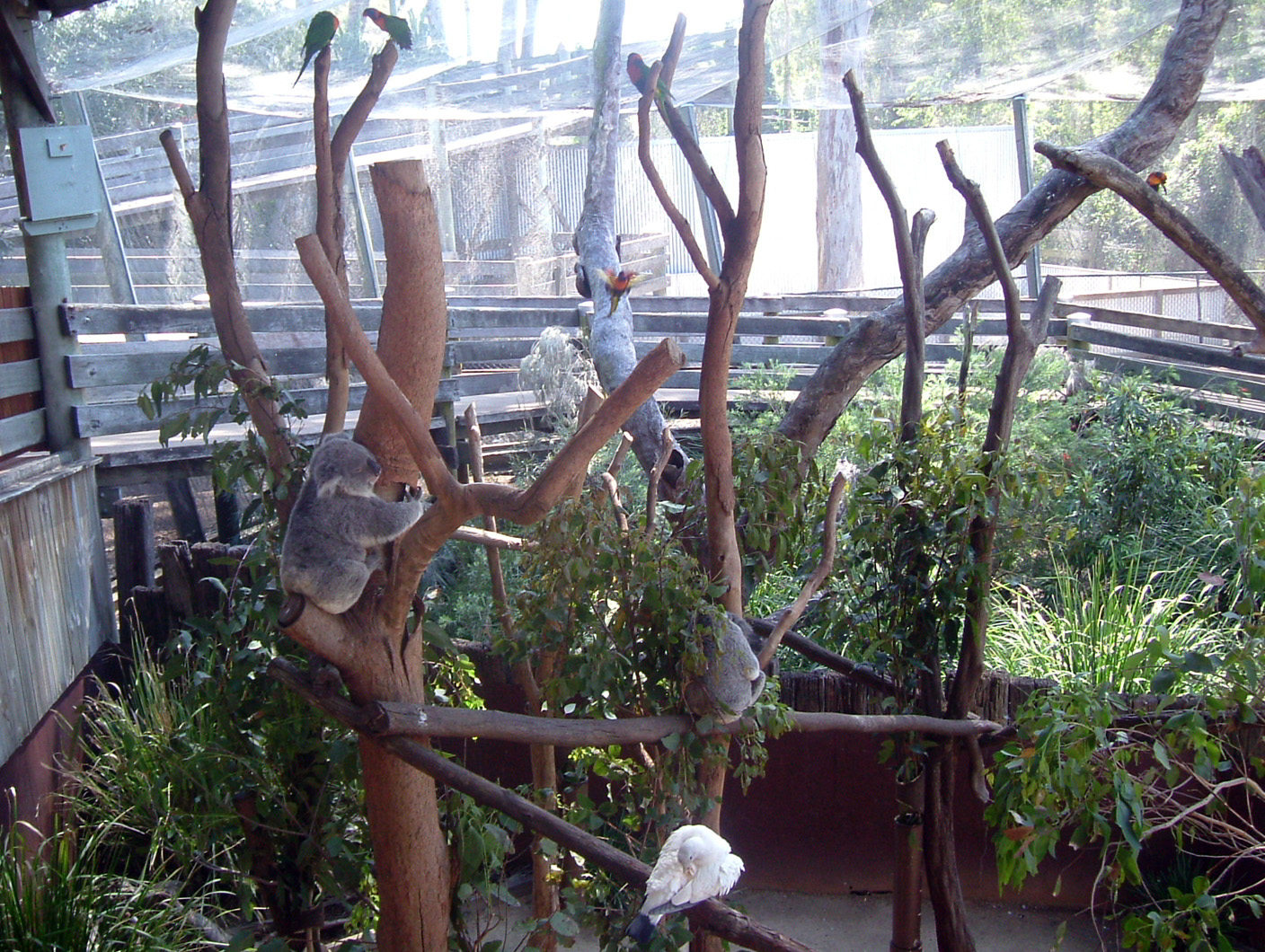
Koala Country in the Dreamworld Corroboree

Dreamworld is broken up into a series of themed areas – each with their own collection of rides, shows, attractions and shops. From the entrance (in a clockwise direction) they are: Main Street, WILD with Australian Geographic, Rivertown, Tiger Island, Kenny and Belinda's Dreamland and Ocean Parade.

=== Themed areas ===
Name	Opened	Theme
WILD with Australian Geographic	2025	Indigenous Australian culture and animals
Kenny and Belinda's Dreamland	2023	Dreamworld and ABC Kids shows
Main Street	1981	Main Street
Rivertown	2024	Jungle themed river town
Ocean Parade	1993	Australian beach culture
Tiger Island	1995	Asian rainforests
WhiteWater World	2006	Waterpark

Main Street serves as the entrance and midway for the park. It features the central station for the Dreamworld Express as well as the Sky Voyager. There area is mainly made up of food, beverage and retail outlets. There area was extended after the removal of Rivertown, and now currently features the Motocoaster.

Gold Rush Country is located to the left of Main Street. It opened on 11 December 1986 with the Eureka Mountain Mine Ride and the Thunder River Rapids Ride. In 2006, the Eureka Mountain Mine Ride was decommissioned due to safety concerns, it was demolished in 2018. Thunder River Rapids Ride was closed in 2016 following a fatal accident and was also removed. Gold Rush Country also featured the BuzzSaw (a Maurer Söhne SkyLoop roller coaster). The area was extended after it took over Rocky Hollow as a sub-themed area. The area now includes The Giant Drop, which opened in 1998 as the world's tallest free fall ride. Standing at 119 metres (390 ft), The Giant Drop accelerates riders at speeds of up to 135 kilometres per hour (84 mph) in a matter of seconds. The area is also features Steel Taipan, a MACK Rides steel launched roller coaster.

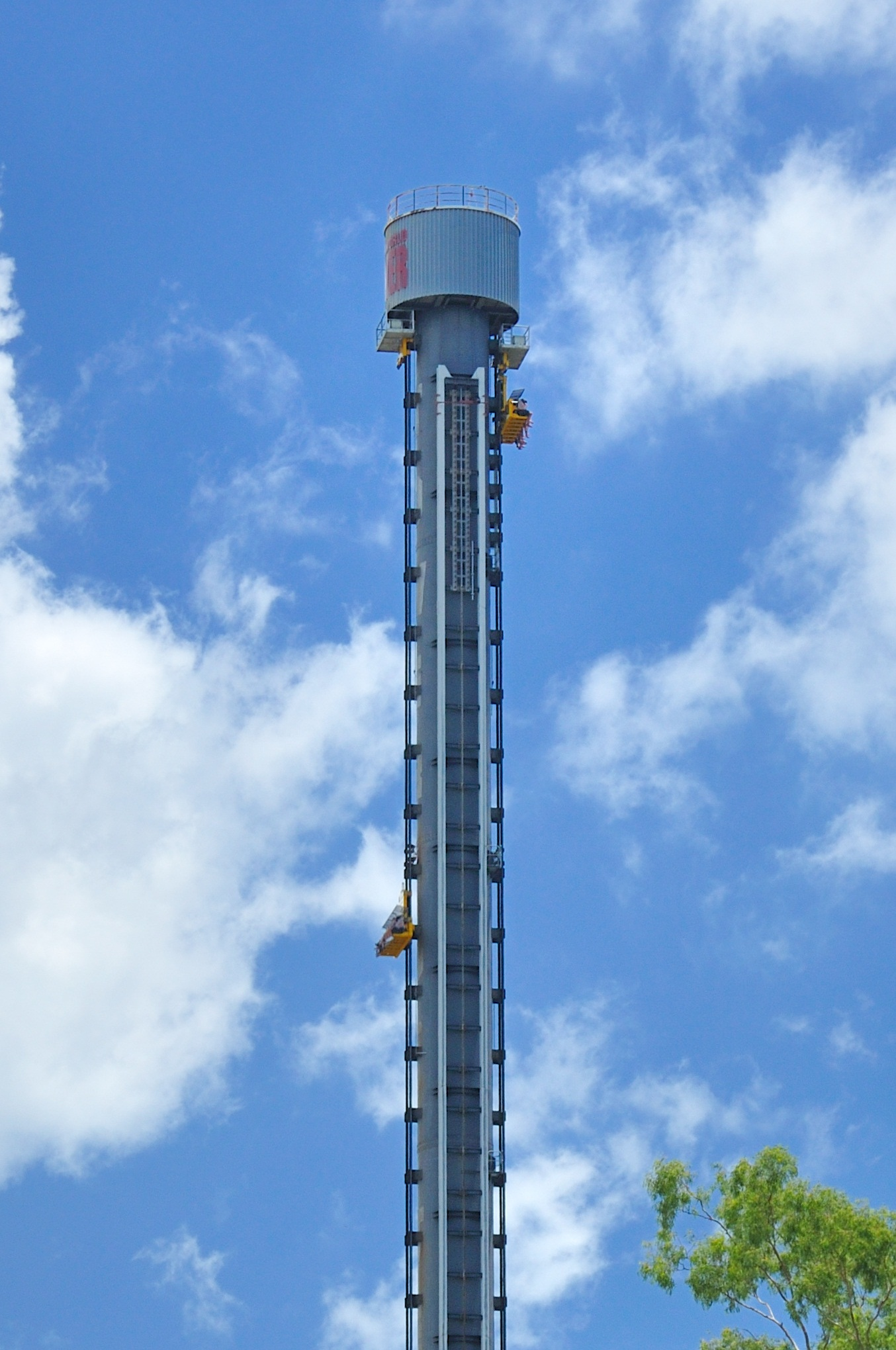
Dreamworld Tower: Once home to the Tower of Terror II (track pictured) and The Giant Drop (gondalas pictured)

Dreamworld Corroboree is a collection of wildlife attractions divided into several subsections which allow guests to view the animals in their natural habitats. It is a registered zoo with 800 native and barnyard animals located within the Dreamworld grounds. There area is also home to a set of Ford Model T vintage cars which can be driven around a small circuit.

Tiger Island opened in 1995 as one of only two interactive tiger exhibits in the world. The exhibit featured various locations for the tigers to live, swim and play. In 2010, the exhibit is home to 6 Bengal tigers, 6 Sumatran tigers and 2 cougars.

Kenny and Belinda's Dreamland is a section of the park designed specifically for children and tweens. All of the attractions in Kenny and Belinda's Dreamland have been refurbished from their operation as rides in DreamWorks Experience, Kid's World and Nickelodeon Central. The area's flagship attraction is Kenny's Forest Flyer, a suspended family roller coaster.

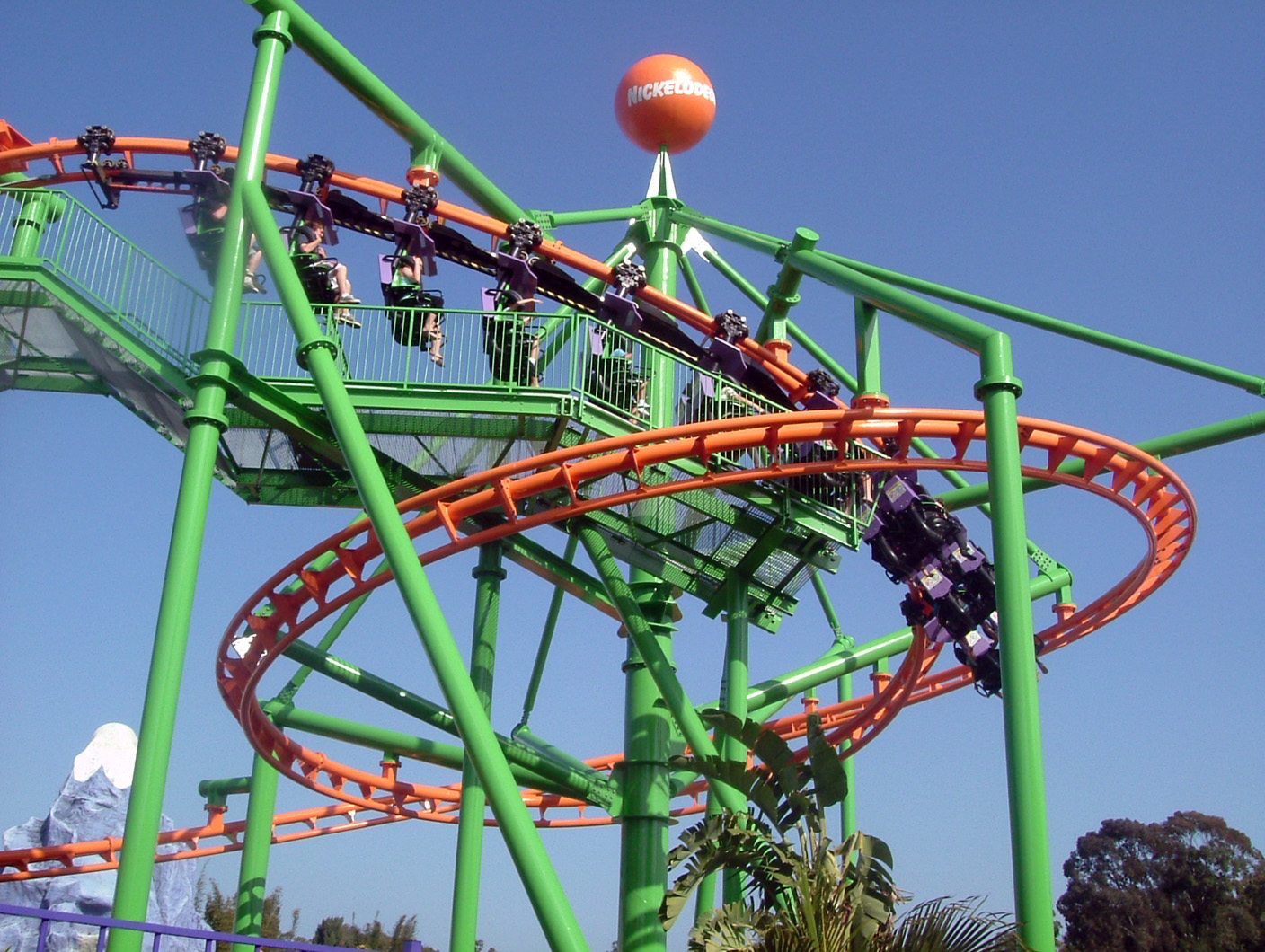
Kenny's Forest Flyer roller coaster in Kenny and Belinda's Dreamland (Rugrats Runaway Reptar theme pictured)

Ocean Parade is the largest themed area at Dreamworld in terms of attractions. It features three thrills rides, being Serpent Slayer, Tail Spin and The Gold Coaster which are within close proximity of each other. Ocean Parade has an Australian beach culture theme with some beach-themed rides scattered around the area including the Shockwave and Deep Sea Dodgems, and formerly the FlowRider. It also features an internal, park-hop entrance to WhiteWater World.

== Rides and attractions ==
Dreamworld’s attractions include a mix of thrill rides, family rides, live entertainment and character meet-and-greets spread across several themed areas. The park features more than 40 attractions.

As well as being Australia's largest theme park, Dreamworld operates as a registered zoo, with wildlife precincts including Wild which features Australian wildlife and Tiger Island that exhibit tigers. Dreamworld offers a range of free and paid animal encounters.

Next to Dreamworld is WhiteWater World, a water park featuring several mild to high thrill slides.

=== High thrill rides ===
Name	Type	Location	Manufacturer	Opened	Ride Express	Comments
The Giant Drop	Drop tower	Main Street	Intamin	1998	Not available	Tallest and fastest drop tower in the Southern-Hemisphere
Steel Taipan	Launched roller coaster	Main Street	MACK Rides	2021	Available	World first 360 degree spinning seat and the Southern-Hemisphere's first triple launch roller coaster
The Gold Coaster	Steel roller coaster	Ocean Parade	Arrow Dynamics	2001	Available	
King Claw	Gyro swing	Ocean Parade	Intamin	2025	Available	Largest Intamin gyro swing ride in the Southern Hemisphere
Serpent Slayer (Wild Style)	Air Race	Ocean Parade	Zamperla	2012	Available	High thrill variation
Tail Spin	Sky Fly	Ocean Parade	Gerstlauer	2014	Available	

=== Moderate thrill rides ===
Name	Type	Location	Manufacturer	Opened	Ride Express	Comments
Jungle Rush	Triple-switch inclined turntable family coaster	Rivertown	Vekoma	2024	Available	Dreamworld’s largest investment in a single attraction and first switchback coaster in the world with multiple variations possible
Sky Voyager	Flying theatre	Main Street	Brogent Technologies	2019	Available	Discover Africa (Park open until 2pm); Australian Landscapes (2pm – close)
Kenny's Forest Flyer	Suspended family roller coaster	Kenny and Belinda's Dreamland	Vekoma	2002	Available	
Shockwave	Disk'O Coaster	Ocean Parade	Zamperla	2011	Available	
Serpent Slayer (Mild Style)	Air Race	Ocean Parade	Zamperla	2012	Available	Moderate thrill variation
The Dreamworld Flyer	Swing ride	Main Street	Preston & Barbieri	2023	Available	
Deep Sea Dodgems	Dodgems	Ocean Parade	SBF Visa	1983	Available	
Big Red Boat Coaster	Kiddie powered roller coaster	Kenny and Belinda's Dreamland	Zamperla	2023	Available	
Humpty-Go-Round	Kite flyer	Kenny and Belinda's Dreamland	Zamperla	2008	Available	
Lost Mine Mayhem	Family MotorBike Launch Coaster	Rivertown	Intamin	2027	Unknown	AU$20,000,000 Retheme of the former Motocoaster

=== Mild rides ===
Name	Type	Location	Manufacturer	Opened	Ride Express	Comments
Murrissippi Motors	Vintage cars (Ford Model T)	Rivertown	Ford Motor Company	2024	Available	
Dreamworld Express	Narrow gauge railway	Main Street	C&S (locomotive); Severn Lamb (carriages)	1981	Available	
Big Red Plane	Children's rotating ride	Kenny and Belinda's Dreamland	SBF Visa	2000	Available	
Bananas in Pyjamas Carousel	Carousel	Kenny and Belinda's Dreamland	Ferrari	1983	Available	
Play School Wheel	Mini ferris wheel	Kenny and Belinda's Dreamland	Zamperla	2018	Available	

=== Attractions (non-ride) ===
Name	Type	Location	Manufacturer	Opened	Comments
Kenny and Belinda's Dreamland
Bananas in Pyjamas Fun Maze	Maze	Kenny and Belinda's Dreamland	Dreamworld	2015	
Belinda's Treehouse	Ball play area	Kenny and Belinda's Dreamland	Prime Play	2002	
The Dreamworld Theatre	Show arena	Kenny and Belinda's Dreamland	Dreamworld	2012	
Ocean Parade
Dreamworld Exhibition Centre	Exhibition centre	Ocean Parade	Dreamworld	2018	
Kickback Cove	Shaded seating area	Ocean Parade	Dreamworld	2019	
Seabed Splash	Interactive splash pad	Ocean Parade	Swimplex Aquatics	2023	
Game Site	Video arcade	Ocean Parade	Dreamworld	1983	
Hook A Duck	Fair game	Ocean Parade	Unknown	Unknown	
Lobster Pot	Fair game	Ocean Parade	Unknown	Unknown	
Tiger Island
Rock Habitat	Animal exhibit	Tiger Island	Dreamworld	2011	
Tiger Island	Animal exhibit	Tiger Island	Dreamworld	1995	
Main Street
Basketball	Fair game	Main Street	Unknown	Unknown	
Lockbuster	Fair game	Main Street	Unknown	Unknown	
Remota Boats	Remote control boats	Main Street	Unknown	Unknown	
Wild
Badu	Show theatre	Wild	Dreamworld	2017	
Bilby House	Animal exhibit	Wild	Dreamworld	2001	
Daintree Rainforest	Animal exhibit	Wild	Dreamworld	2001	
Dreamworld Woolshed	Animal exhibit	Wild	Dreamworld	2010	
Humpy	Exhibit	Wild	Dreamworld	2017	
Kakadu Wetlands	Animal exhibit	Wild	Dreamworld	2001	
Koala Country	Animal exhibit	Wild	Dreamworld	1987	
Outback Adventure	Animal exhibit	Wild	Dreamworld	2001	
Twilight Trail	Animal exhibit	Wild	Dreamworld	2022	

=== Regular shows ===
Show name	Description / Location
Bananas in Pyjamas Appearance	Character meet and greet in Kenny and Belinda's Dreamland.
Sock Hop Rock	Live dance performance featuring classic Dreamworld characters.
Kenny and Belinda Appearance	Character meet and greet with park mascots.
Kenny and Belinda’s Dance Party	Interactive dance show for families and children.
Rat in a Hat Appearance	Appearance by the Bananas in Pyjamas character Rat in a Hat.
Wiggly Friends Appearance	Meet and greet with characters from The Wiggles franchise.
Wiggly Friends Show	Live stage show featuring songs and characters from The Wiggles.
Tiger Island Keeper Talk	Educational talk about tiger conservation at Tiger Island.
Crocodile Presentation	Live educational show about crocodiles in Wild.
Koala Talk	Informational discussion about koalas and habitat conservation.
Bilby Talk	Educational session about the bilby species and its protection.
Our Country	Live presentation within Wild celebrating Australian wildlife and culture.

=== Paid animal attractions ===
Experience	Description
Croc Feeding Experience	Guests assist keepers in feeding crocodiles under supervision.
Dingo Encounter	Interactive session meeting Dreamworld’s dingoes up close.
Koala Pat	Photo opportunity and gentle koala interaction.
Koala Cuddle	Guided experience offering the chance to hold a koala and take a photo.
Tiger Feed	Close-up tiger feeding experience with handlers at Tiger Island.
Bilby Experience	Private educational encounter featuring Dreamworld’s bilbies.

=== Animal species ===
Name	Type	Location
Barn owl	Bird	Wild
Bengal tiger	Mammal	Tiger Island
Black-headed python	Reptile	Wild
Blue-tongued skink	Reptile	Wild
Brisbane river turtle	Reptile	Wild
Cane toad	Amphibian	Wild
Coastal carpet python	Reptile	Wild
Darwin carpet python	Reptile	Wild
Dingo	Mammal	Wild
Eastern grey kangaroo	Mammal	Wild
Emu	Bird	Wild
Fat-tailed dunnart	Mammal	Wild
Freshwater crocodile	Reptile	Wild
Greater bilby	Mammal	Wild
Green tree python	Reptile	Wild
Jungle carpet python	Reptile	Wild
Koala	Mammal	Wild
Lumholtz's tree kangaroo	Mammal	Wild
Magnificent tree frog	Amphibian	Wild
Mary river turtle	Reptile	Wild
Olive python	Reptile	Wild
Red kangaroo	Mammal	Wild
Rough-scaled python	Reptile	Wild
Rufous bettong	Mammal	Wild
Saltwater crocodile	Reptile	Wild
Shingleback skink	Reptile	Wild
Snapping turtle	Reptile	Wild
Southern cassowary	Bird	Wild
Southern hairy-nosed wombat	Mammal	Wild
Spinifex hopping mouse	Mammal	Wild
Squirrel glider	Mammal	Wild
Sumatran tiger	Mammal	Tiger Island
Tasmanian devil	Mammal	Wild
Tawny frogmouth	Bird	Wild
Water python	Reptile	Wild
Wedge-tailed eagle	Bird	Wild
Woma python	Reptile	Wild

=== WhiteWater World ===
Name	Type	Thrill level	Manufacturer	Opened	Slide Express	Comments
The BRO	Multilane racer	High	ProSlide	2006	Available	
The Green Room	Funnel slide	High	ProSlide	2006	Available	
Fully 6 – Slides 2 & 3	Speed slides	High	Swimplex-Polin Australia	2019	Available	Long-term maintenance
Triple Vortex	Water slide	High	ProSlide	2014	Available	
The Little Rippers	Bowl slide	High	ProSlide	2007	Available	
The Rip	Bowl slide	High	ProSlide	2006	Available	
The Wedgie	Drop slide	High	ProSlide	2010		
Fully 6 – Slides 1 & 4, 5 & 6	Body slides	Moderate	Swimplex-Polin Australia	2019	Available	
Super Tubes Hydrocoaster	Water coaster	Moderate	ProSlide	2006		
The Temple of Huey	Inline tube slide	Moderate	ProSlide	2006	Available	
Cave of Waves	Wave pool	Mild	Murphy's Waves of Scotland	2006		
Pipeline Plunge	Play structure & slides	Mild	ProSlide	2006		
Wiggle Bay	Kids play area & body slides	Mild	ProSlide	2006		
The Shell	Shaded eating area	Attraction	Dreamworld	2006		

=== Previous attractions ===
Like all theme parks, attractions are sometimes closed due to age and replaced with more contemporary attractions. Dreamworld has seen this action used a great deal of times, with many attraction closures, replacements and expansions.

== Food, beverages and shopping outlets ==
Dreamworld has several of food, beverages and shopping outlets located around the park with some shops themed around rides. The following is a list of outlets:

=== Food and beverages ===
Some dining locations offer online ordering & table service via the dreamworld website or QR Codes that can be scanned.

Name	Themed Area	Opened	
Jane's Rivertown Restaurant	Rivertown	1995 (2024)	Formerly known as the Riverwalk Restaurant & Billabong Buffet; Temporarily closed due to COVID-19 restrictions. Reopened & rethemed in 2024 with the new Rivertown land.
Food Central	Main Street		
Ice Cream Parlour	Main Street		Serves Peters ice cream products, fairy floss & drinks.
Green Bean Coffee Co	Main Street	2014	
Churros Stand	Main Street	2024	
Kenny's Fried Chicken	Main Street	2014 (2022)	Occasionally rethemed to seasonal events such as WinterFest, Formerly Dough Bros Pizzeria.
The Sandwich Shop	Main Street	2014	Sandwiches, salads, wraps, toasties, pastas.
Presto's Training Cafe	Corroboree	2015	Formerly known as Kai Kai Café
Barrels Smokehouse	Ocean Parade	2024	Replaced Grids Burger & Sports Bar, Barrels Burger Bar; Seasonal
Bite Me Cafe	WhiteWater World	2006	
Salties Ice Cream Parlour	WhiteWater World		Formerly known as Salty's Kiosk
Island Noodle Hut	Tiger Island	2017	Replaced Bengal Tea House, Seasonal.
Flamin' Ribs	Main Street	2023	Slow cooked meats from a custom smoker, Seasonal & Night Market's Only.
Diggity Dogs	Ocean Parade		Hot Dogs, Seasonal.
Fries a Plenty	Main Street	2023	Seasonal
Candy Nut & Fudge	Main Street		
Jelly Belly	Main Street	2022	Formerly in a standalone store. Located inside of Candy Nut & Fudge.

=== Shopping outlets ===
Name	Themed Area	Opened	
LEGO Store	Main Street	2017	Opened as Australia's first LEGO Certified Store.
Surf Central	Main Street		
Main Street Emporium	Main Street	1981	Expanded & refurbished in 2024.
Beyond the Beach	WhiteWater World	2006	Includes ride photos from Super Tubes Hydrocoaster, The Green Room and The Temple of Huey.
Tiger Bazaar	Tiger Island	2017	
DreamPix Photos	Main Street		Formerly known as Kodak Express
Fairytale Treasures	Main Street		
Showbags	Main Street	2022	Seasonal & Night Market's Only.
Pete's Sketch	Main Street		Custom Sketched artworks made by Pete himself.
Koala Photos	Corroboree		
Rivertown Traders	Rivertown	2007	Formerly Motocoaster Pit Stop. Includes ride photos from the Motocoaster & Rivertown Merchandise.
Shaka Shack	Ocean Parade	2020	Includes ride photos from The Gold Coaster
Hair Braiding	Ocean Parade		

== Guest features ==
Dreamworld offers a virtual queuing system called Ride & Slide Express that can be used on almost all rides and slides. Ride & Slide Express can be purchased either online or at Guest Services.

A photo pass is also available for purchase that can save on-ride photos and character photos. Photos from the Corroboree such as the Koala Photos must be purchased separately.

Dreamworld also offer a Play Pass card for its Gamesite Arcade. Guests can load funds onto their Play Pass to play any of the arcade machines.

Guest's can purchase tickets at various prices to experience the spinning seats known as "Tailwhip" onboard the Steel Taipan roller coaster. Passholders can access discounted tickets for this experience.

Children's wagons & mobility scooters can be hired from Guest Services.

Animal experiences including Crocodile feeding, Koala photos, dingo encounters, tiger feeding, snake pictures, bird photos and seasonal petting zoo feeding and photos are all available for purchase.

== Incidents ==
- In January 2001, prior to park opening, 4 empty rafts of the Thunder River Rapids Ride flipped, no one was injured.
- In October 2004, a female guest fell into the water of the Thunder River Rapids Ride whilst disembarking.
- On 25 October 2016 at 2:20 pm AEST, four people were killed in an incident on the Thunder River Rapids Ride. The ride would be permanently closed and demolished.
- In Late 2020, an 8 year old girl allegedly received injuries to her groin area whilst riding the newly opened Fully 6 Waterslides at WhiteWater World.
- In September 2024, a trained animal handler was bitten by one of the parks' tigers. The senior handler was transported to hospital with injuries to her arm and released that afternoon.

== See also ==
- Dreamworld Wildlife Foundation
- SkyPoint Observation Deck
- WhiteWater World
