= Dreamworld Studios =

Former auditorium

Dreamworld
- Coordinates: 27.861454°S 153.314206°E
- Status: Removed
- Opening date: 1986
- Closing date: 2019

Ride statistics
- Attraction type: Auditorium
- Designer: Dreamworld
- Previous names: Music Bowl; Dreamworld Amphitheatre

Dreamworld Studios was an auditorium with production facilities located at the Dreamworld theme park on the Gold Coast, Australia. It is notable for being the location of Big Brother Australia's live shows. In 2019, the studio, along with the Big Brother house, was bulldozed to make way for Steel Taipan. However, in 2025 a new base for the production facilities of Big Brother's reboot was constructed inside the existing Dreamworld exhibition centre behind the Gold Coaster.

== History ==
Dreamworld Studios opened in 1986 as the Music Bowl. Around 1990, the auditorium's name was changed to Dreamworld Amphitheatre before being renamed Dreamworld Studios in 2001 when Big Brother Australia began production. In August 2019, the venue was demolished to make way for a future attraction for the theme park. In the months prior to its demise, vision of the abandoned house spread across social media. This resulted in numerous trespassers and vandals visiting the compound. Later, four children were charged with arson after they were seen running from the abandoned house at the time that a fire broke out.

== Usage ==
=== Big Brother ===
Dreamworld Studios are mostly used during the production of Big Brother Australia. The Big Brother house was located a short walk away from the studios. This allowed live shows to take place in the auditorium. Big Brother was produced at Dreamworld from 2001 until 2008 for Network Ten and from 2012 until 2014 for the Nine Network.

=== Temporary use ===
During periods where Big Brother was not in production, Dreamworld Studios have been used for various temporary shows.

In 2004, Dreamworld played host to the Believe in Dreams illusion show at Dreamworld Studios. The show starred John Taylor.

In 2006, a new and improved 'games area' was built at Dreamworld Studios for Big Brother Friday Night Live and its spinoff show: 'Friday Night Games'.

MTV Plugs Into Dreamworld (sometimes shortened to MTV Plugs In) was a temporary live show held in the Dreamworld Studios amphitheatre for the 2009–2010 summer school holidays. The show was run from 26 December 2009 to 22 January 2010. The 30-minute performance was shown 3 times a day and included a variety of music, dancing and stunts in a game show-like format.

== Present day ==
Today, most of the site is now mostly used for storage. Part of the site is now occupied by the Steel Taipan roller coaster. The original Baldwin steam locomotive of the Dreamworld Express is currently stored there. All live shows are now held in Ocean Parade either at the Dreamworld Exhibition Centre or at the old Thunderbolt site.
