= The Claw (Dreamworld) =

Intamin Gyro Swing at Dreamworld

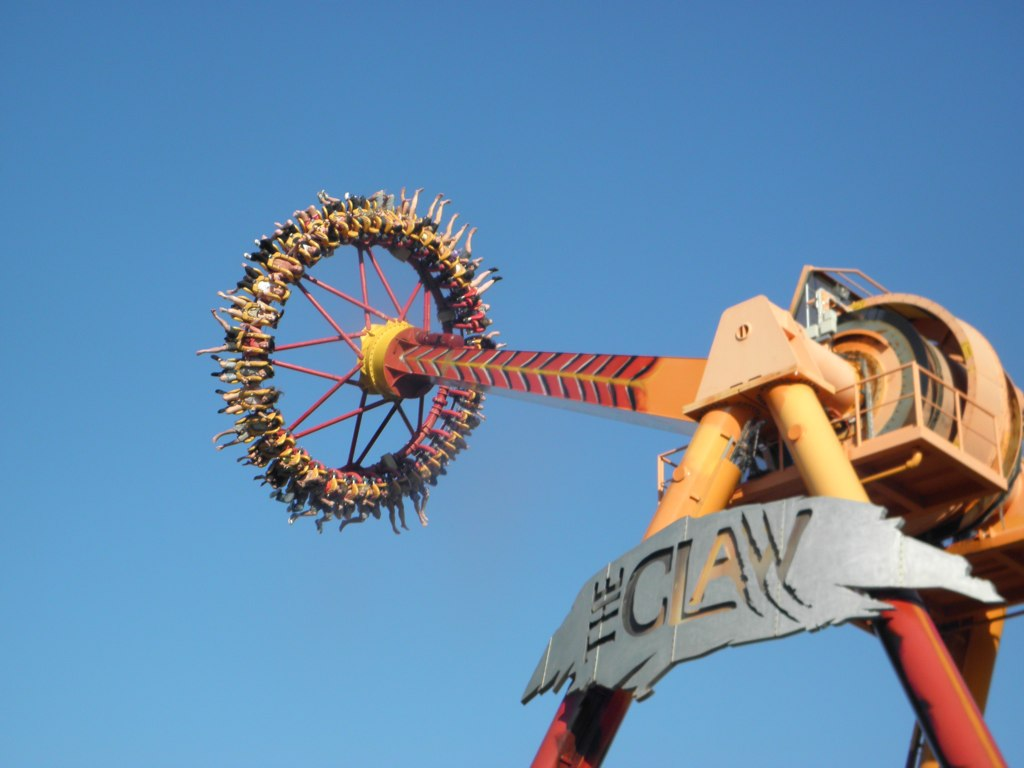
- The Claw at full swing.

Dreamworld
- Area: Ocean Parade
- Coordinates: 27°51′51″S 153°18′58″E
- Status: Removed
- Cost: A$6,000,000
- Opening date: 18 September 2004
- Closing date: 27 January 2025
- Replaced by: King Claw

Ride statistics
- Attraction type: Gyro Swing
- Manufacturer: Intamin
- Height: 27.15 m (89.1 ft)
- Speed: 75 km/h (47 mph)
- Capacity: 400 riders per hour
- Vehicles: 1
- Riders per vehicle: 32
- Duration: 1:30
- Height restriction: 120 cm (3 ft 11 in)
- Swinging Angle: 120° each side
- Slogan: Tearing into Dreamworld
- Ride Express was available

The Claw was an Intamin Gyro Swing located at Dreamworld on the Gold Coast, Australia. The ride opened in September 2004 after months of construction and advertising.

== History ==
In April 2004, construction began on what was rumoured to be a Teen Market Thrill Ride to open later in the year. To aid in the construction, the northern end of Ocean Parade was closed off to the public forcing guests to detour through Nickelodeon Central to get to the other rides that area, including the Cyclone and the Wipeout.

A few days before The Claw was officially announced on 22 July 2004, construction of the ride went vertical. The announcement detailed that the ride was going to be an Intamin Gyro Swing, a duplicate of Maelstrom at Drayton Manor in the United Kingdom.

On 18 September 2004, the ride officially opened to the public as the first Intamin Gyro Swing in the Southern Hemisphere. Queensland Tourism Minister, Margaret Keech, officially opened the ride.

In late 2008, Dreamworld introduced Q4U, a virtual queuing system. For an additional cost, riders can pre-book a spot on the ride without having to join the queue. A special Q4U entry gate was constructed to allow guests with a device to easily enter the ride.

=== Closure and replacement ===
In September 2024, it was announced the ride will shut permanently in January 2025, and be replaced by a larger version of the ride named “King Claw” which began construction in February 2025, with testing underway by September 2025, before the ride officially opened to the public on 12 December 2025.

== Marketing ==
The ride was heavily marketed in the theme park and in the mass media during construction. The television commercial stated:

Prepare yourself for the ultimate thrill ride – The Claw. Swing 9 stories high, spin 360 degrees, reach zero gravity. It's Australia's first, and it's tearing into Dreamworld.

— Dreamworld, The Claw Commercial

The ride's slogan, Tearing into Dreamworld was advertised on the construction fences which surrounded the attraction. It was also advertised on several bus stops across the Gold Coast.

The opening of the ride was televised on Rove Live, a popular Australian variety show. Competition winners won the chance to be the first public riders of The Claw, provided they were naked.

The Claw was also featured prominently in the opening title sequence for Big Brother Australia from 2005 to 2008, a reality TV show filmed at Dreamworld from 2001 to 2008, 2012 to 2014 and 2025 onwards.

== Ride ==
The Claw is a one and a half-minute ride in which riders are swung from side to side on an axis in a similar fashion to that of a pirate ship ride. However, the seating arrangement on The Claw and other Gyro Swing rides is in a circular formation. The ride seats 32 guests at a time in a single ring which slowly rotates as the ride operates. Riders reach a top speed of 75 kilometres per hour (47 mph) as the ride swings over 240°. The restraints are over the shoulder, hydraulic restraints plus a seatbelt.
