= Thunderbolt (Dreamworld) =

Defunct steel roller coaster

- One of the Thunderbolt's trains passing through the second vertical loop.

Dreamworld
- Location: Dreamworld
- Park section: Country Fair
- Coordinates: 27°51′54.5″S 153°18′59.5″E
- Status: Removed
- Opening date: April 1982
- Closing date: 8 August 2003
- Cost: A$3.3 million
- Replaced by: FlowRider; WhiteWater World

General statistics
- Type: Steel
- Manufacturer: Sanoyas Hishino Meisho
- Model: Sitdown Looper
- Lift/launch system: Chain Lift Hill
- Height: 31 m (102 ft)
- Length: 1,207 m (3,960 ft)
- Speed: 87 km/h (54 mph)
- Inversions: 2
- Capacity: 960 riders per hour
- Acceleration: 0 to 87 km/h (0 to 54 mph) in 4 seconds
- Height restriction: 120 cm (3 ft 11 in)
- Trains: 2 trains with 6 cars. Riders are arranged 2 across in 2 rows for a total of 24 riders per train.
- Loop Heights: 21 m (69 ft)
- Thunderbolt at RCDB

The Thunderbolt was a steel roller coaster located at the Dreamworld theme park in Gold Coast, Australia. The roller coaster opened with the park in April 1982 and operated until 8 August 2003. It was demolished the following year.

== History ==
On 15 December 1981, Dreamworld officially opened to the public. In April 1982, the park opened its first roller coaster - the Thunderbolt. It was the first roller coaster in Australia to feature vertical loops. Originally painted completely white, the Thunderbolt was repainted around 1990 to feature golden loops. In 1995, a new train was purchased for half a million dollars in an attempt to make the ride more comfortable.

In 2002, Dreamworld conducted a feasibility study into the possibility of redeveloping the attraction. The park approached Arrow Dynamics, Kumbak and Vekoma, however, it was determined that the redevelopment was unfeasible due to the ride's condition.

On 8 August 2003, the ride was closed, and it remained closed while attempts were made to sell it. It was removed in March 2004 in a way that made it clear that it was not going to operate again. Dreamworld retained a section of track and one train, both of which reside in the park's back-of-house areas.

The land where Thunderbolt stood was partly occupied by Dreamworld's previousFlowRider installation, but now WhiteWater World. Future expansions of the WhiteWater World water park will use the rest of the Thunderbolt's former footprint. The station building is now used for the internal entry to WhiteWater World and the previously the FlowRider shop.

== Ride ==
Built by Japanese firm Sanoyas Hishino Meisho, the Thunderbolt measured 1,207 metres (3,960 ft) in length making it the longest roller coaster in Australia. Even after the ride's closure, it remained the longest Australian roller coaster until the opening of DC Rivals Hypercoaster at Movie World Gold Coast in September 2017. It was capable of reaching speeds of up to 87 km/h (54 mph). The ride, which stood 31 metres (102 ft) off the ground, featured two vertical loops standing at 21 metres (69 ft) each.
