= DWF =

DWF may refer to:

- Design Web Format, in computing
- Dreamworld Wildlife Foundation
- Dudh Sagar Water Falls railway station, Goa
- DWF Group, a legal firm
