= Jungle Rush =

Switchback roller coaster at Dreamworld

Dreamworld
- Location: Dreamworld
- Park section: Rivertown
- Coordinates: 27°51′50.3″S 153°19′05.3″E
- Status: Operating
- Soft opening date: 18 December 2024
- Opening date: 23 December 2024
- Cost: A$35,000,000
- Replaced: Big Red Car Ride

General statistics
- Type: Steel – Switchback
- Manufacturer: Vekoma
- Model: Switchback coaster
- Lift/launch system: Drive tire lift hill
- Inversions: 0
- Height restriction: 95–205 cm (3 ft 1 in – 6 ft 9 in)
- Theme: Jungle temple
- Website: Official website
- Airtime points: 12
- Ride Express available
- Single rider line available
- Jungle Rush at RCDB

Jungle Rush is a Vekoma switchback coaster located within the Rivertown themed area at the Dreamworld amusement park on the Gold Coast, Australia.

The ride is the world's first switchback coaster,and it has the ability to traverse multiple different paths. The ride consists of outdoor and show sections, with the theming created by Pico Play, and reflecting an ancient jungle temple.

== History ==
On 24 November 2022, Dreamworld announced a A$55,000,000 investment into the park consisting of the new Kenny and Belinda's Dreamland and Rivertown themed areas, which included Jungle Rush. Rivertown was slated to open in late-2024. In early 2024, it was announced that Pico Play was working on Rivertown's theming, which included the temple that Jungle Rush is located within. This marked Dreamworld's 10th collaboration with the company.

On 18 December 2024, the Rivertown area (excluding Murrissippi Motors) soft opened, allowing the general public to experience the area for the first time. Jungle Rush officially opened on 23 December 2024 with the new Rivertown area.

Dan Mickan, Director and Project Manager at Herron Coorey stated that “Rivertown is a game-changer for Dreamworld and for the Gold Coast, and we’re thrilled to see it open to the public”. Randy Garfield, Board of Directors at Coast Entertainment and former President of Walt Disney Travel Company and Vice President for Disney Parks, Experiences and Products also noted that “what Dreamworld has achieved with Rivertown is extraordinary. With the quality of the theming, the attention to detail, the physical site and the ride itself, it’s different from anything Disney has but just as good. And I mean that. Nothing in this country comes close to what you’re about to see”.

== Ride characteristics ==
Jungle Rush is a custom switchback coaster, which consists of the world's first inclined triple-switch turntable, which allows the roller coaster train to travel both forwards and backwards. This allows the ride to operate several different cycle paths, which allows the ride time to vary.

The ride has 2 trains themed to jeeps which can hold up to 20 riders. The ride track consists of 12 airtime points as well as a drive tire lift hill. The ride also features show moments and immersive theming.

== Ride experience ==
=== Theming ===
Jungle Rush is themed to an ancient jungle temple where you board a Jeep and explore the temple's mysteries at wild speeds. The ride also interacts with Murrissippi Motors, including the wrecked Caribou A4-179 aircraft.

=== Entrance and queue ===
The ride's entrance is located next to Jane's Rivertown Restaurant. The queue is located inside of a building themed to a jungle temple. The queue has a variety of jungle theming which included snakes, gems, ancient temple artworks and also a skull from the former Tower of Terror II attraction. Water features are also present. The queue eventually splits into four separate queues: Depart Forwards, Depart Backwards, Single Rider and Ride Express.

== See also ==
- 2024 in amusement parks
- Murrissippi Motors
- Rivertown
