= Big Red Car Ride =

Former dark ride

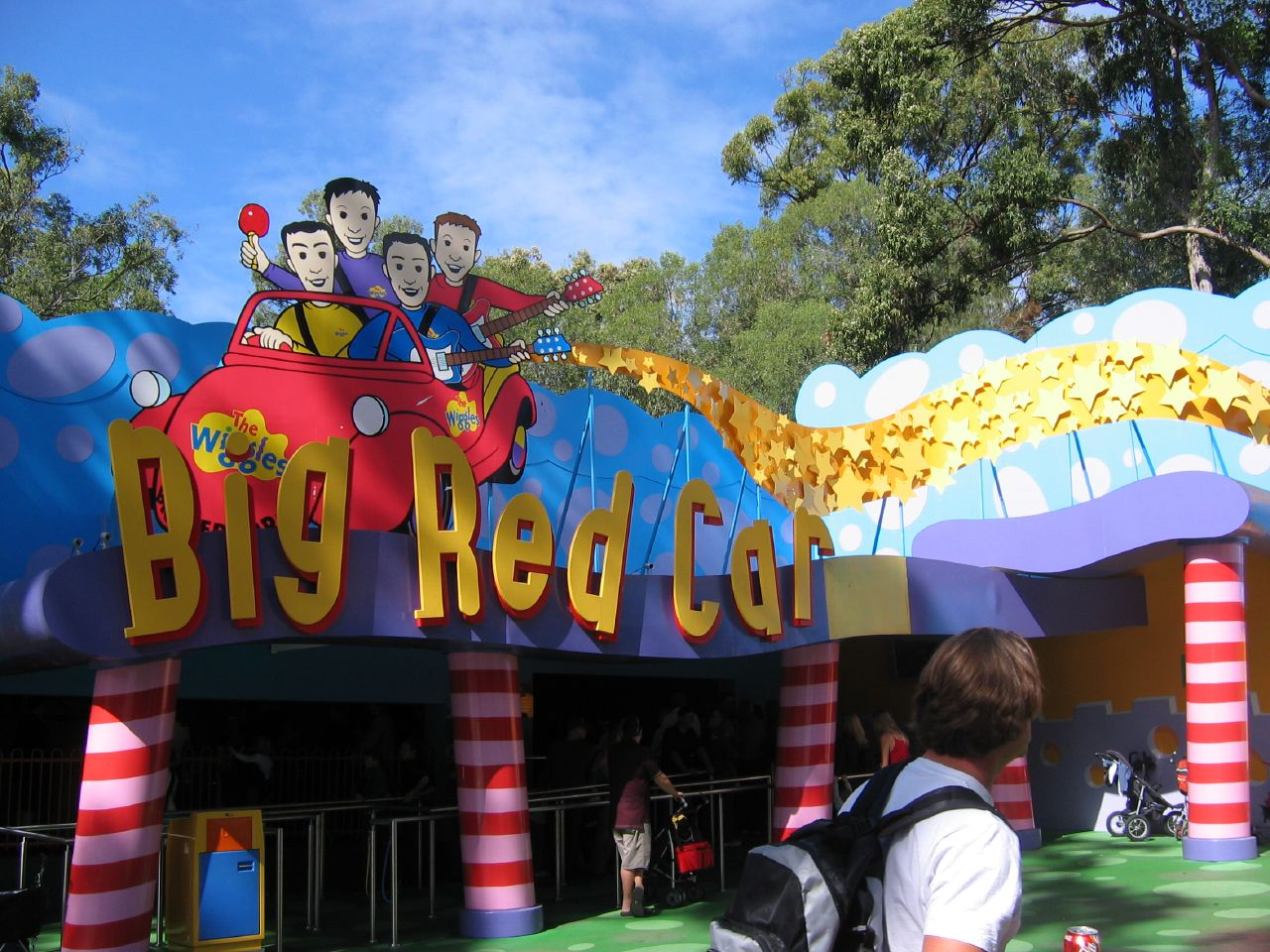
- Entrance of the Big Red Car Ride in 2006

Dreamworld
- Area: ABC Kids World
- Coordinates: 27°51′50.5″S 153°19′04.9″E
- Status: Removed
- Soft opening date: 13 September 2005
- Opening date: 17 September 2005
- Closing date: 12 August 2020
- Replaced: Lara Croft Tomb Raider – Enter the Tomb
- Replaced by: Jungle Rush

Ride statistics
- Manufacturer: Simtech
- Theme: The Wiggles
- Length: 120 m (390 ft)
- Speed: 2 km/h (1.2 mph)
- Vehicles: 5
- Riders per vehicle: 6
- Rows: 2
- Riders per row: 3
- Duration: 2:30
- Ride Express available

The Big Red Car Ride was a dark ride at the Dreamworld theme park in Queensland, Australia, based on and featuring the Australian children's musical group the Wiggles. The ride took 6 guests at a time on a 120-metre (390 ft) car journey through the Wiggles' house. The house features Wag's Kennel, Henry's Underwater Big Band, and Dorothy's rosy garden. The attraction opened with Wiggles World on 17 September 2005 and closed on 12 August 2020.

The ride takes place inside The Wiggles' house with several of themed rooms dedicated to The Wiggles' characters.

At the time of its closure, the ride was Dreamworld's only traditional dark ride and was the anchor attraction of ABC Kids World which excluding the Big Red Car Ride, consisted only of small children's rides.

== History ==
The trackless dark ride attraction was developed by two New Zealand-based firms who have previously worked for Walt Disney Imagineering prototyping autonomous vehicles. Arvus Group oversaw the project and subcontracted the manufacturing of the trackless ride system to Simtech, a now-defunct manufacturer. The trackless ride system relies upon a wire buried in the floor and allows the cars to rotate on the spot, something many track-based dark rides cannot do. The five vehicles are recharged at the station through an inductive charging system.

The Big Red Car Ride soft opened on 13 September 2005 with The Wiggles being the first riders. The ride eventually opened to the public on 17 September 2005, in time with the September school holidays in Australia, replacing the Lara Croft Tomb Raider – Enter the Tomb attraction which closed the previous year during a halloween event at Dreamworld.

On 12 August 2020, Dreamworld announced that the park would be reopening on 16 September after being closed since March due to the COVID-19 pandemic. The announcement came with the closure of the Big Red Car Ride and FlowRider. The park stated that both attractions were closed following a "attraction review". The ABC Kids Store which connected to the ride's exit has been closed ever since. Both rides remained dormant, however, one of the ride's vehicle was placed outside of the ride as a photo opportunity. The ride was eventually demolished in 2023, due to the closure of ABC Kids World.

== Characteristics ==
At the time of closure, the Big Red Car Ride was one of Dreamworld's eleven kids rides alongside, ABC Kids World Fun Spot, Bananas in Pyjamas Fun Maze, Big Red Boat Ride, Dorothy's Rosy Tea Cup Ride, Dronkey Flyers, Giggle and Hoot Pirate Ship, Play School Art Room, Play School Wheel, Puss in Boots Sword Swing and Shrek's Orge-Go-Round. The ride has six vehicles, Each vehicle can carry up to six riders, three per row. Seat belts are in place to restrain riders. Interactive microphones are also present in the vehicle however they have no use whatsoever. The vehicles are based on The Wiggles' Big Red Car.

The ride is 120 metres (390 ft) long and has a speed 2 kilometres per hour (1.2 mph) making it one of the slowest amusement park rides in Australia. An entire ride takes approximately 2 minutes and 30 seconds.

== Ride Experience ==
The ride starts with the vehicle entering the Wiggles' garden (changed to Emma's room in 2013). A quick introduction is done on a screen featuring The Wiggles. Then the ride turn right into the kitchen where The Wiggles start singing "Hot Potato" on another screen. Kitchen cabinets and appliances starts to open and close when riders enter the kitchen room. The vehicle then continues to The Wiggles living room where they start singing "Wake Up Jeff!" (changed to "Wake Up Lachy!" in 2013) on another screen. The vehicle continues into a room dedicated to Wags the Dog. "Wave at Wags" is played. Wags the Dog is seen sliding down a small slide when riders enter the room. The vehicle then enters an ocean themed room dedicated to Henry the Octopus. The vehicle then turn right to Dorothy the Dinosaur's garden where Dorothy the Dinosaur is seen swinging on a swing. Then a farewell is done and a on-ride photo is taken. The vehicle then exits the room where riders exit to their left through the ABC Kids Store. During transitions into different rooms, the "Big Red Car" song is played.

Prior to the retirements of three of The Wiggles' members, the ride initially first entered The Wiggles' garden. Murray Cook, Jeff Fatt, Anthony Field and Greg Page were featured on the ride from 2005 to 2007 and 2012 with Sam Moran replacing Page from 2007 to 2011.

== Cast ==
The ride featured all the band member of The Wiggles since 2005. (Note: The years provided are the years of which cast member appeared on the ride and not when they appeared in The Wiggles band.)

- Anthony Field – Blue Wiggle (2005–2020)
- Lachlan Gillespie – Purple Wiggle (2013–2020)
- Simon Pryce – Red Wiggle (2013–2020)
- Emma Watkins – Yellow Wiggle (2013–2020)
- Jeff Fatt – Purple Wiggle (2005–2013)
- Murray Cook – Red Wiggle (2005–2013)
- Greg Page – Yellow Wiggle (2005–2007; 2012–2013)
- Sam Moran – Yellow Wiggle (2007–2011)

== See also ==
- 2020 in amusement parks
- The Wiggles
