= ABC Kids World =

Themed land at Dreamworld amusement park

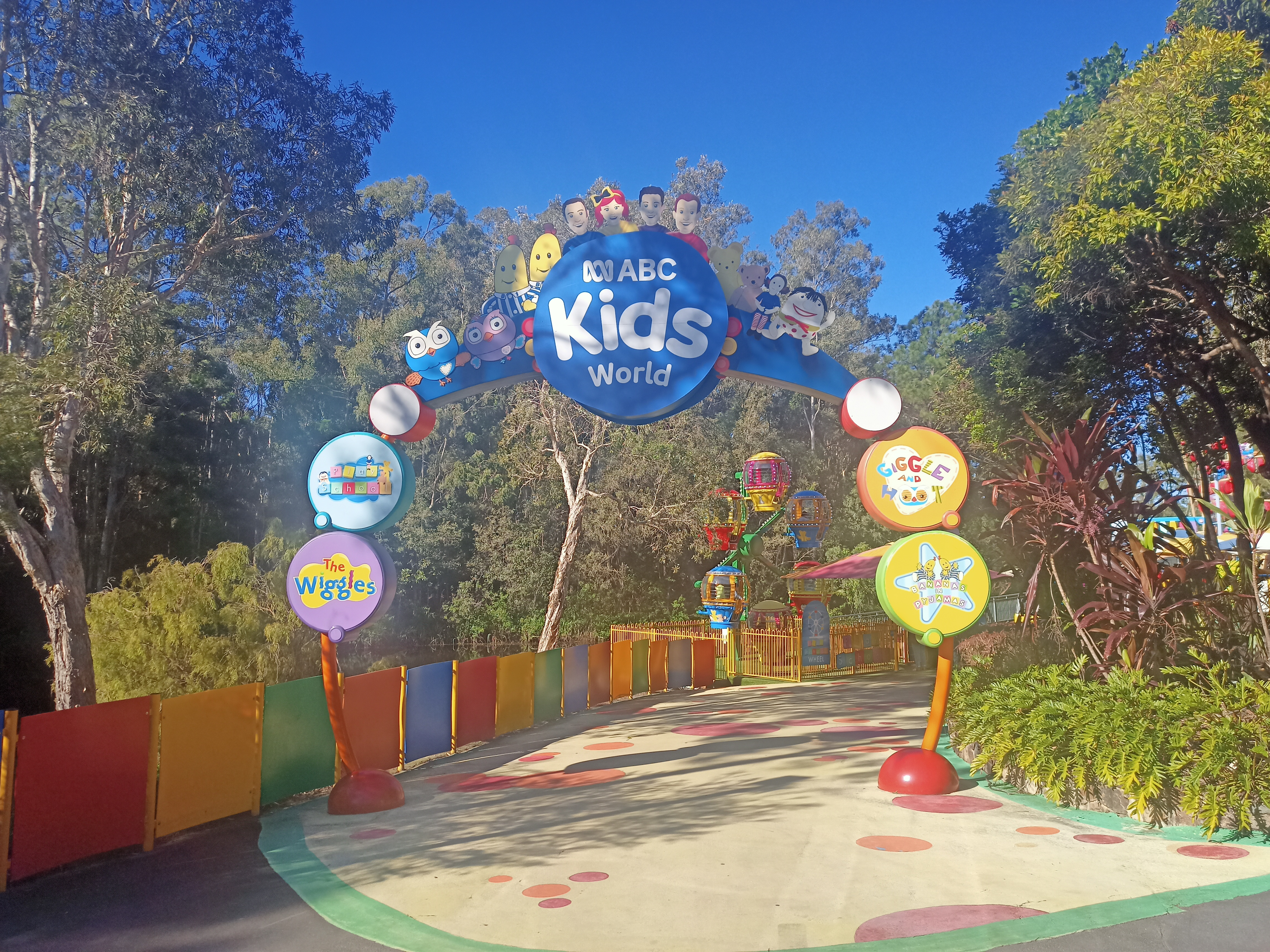
- The ABC Kids World entrance sign from Main Street in June 2021.
- Interactive map of ABC Kids World
- Coordinates: 27.863759°S 153.317792°E
- Status: Defunct
- Theme: ABC Kids

Attractions
- Total: 8
- Other rides: 7
- Shows: 1

Dreamworld
- Opened: 17 September 2005 (as Wiggles World); 27 June 2015 (as ABC Kids World)
- Closed: 8 October 2023
- Replaced: Gum Tree Gully
- Replaced by: Rivertown

ABC Kids World (formerly known as Wiggles World) was a themed land at the Dreamworld amusement park on the Gold Coast, Queensland, Australia. The area was dedicated to the shows and characters from various shows that air on ABC Kids.

The area was originally opened as Wiggles World on 17 September 2005 replacing the previous Gum Tree Gully section.

== History ==
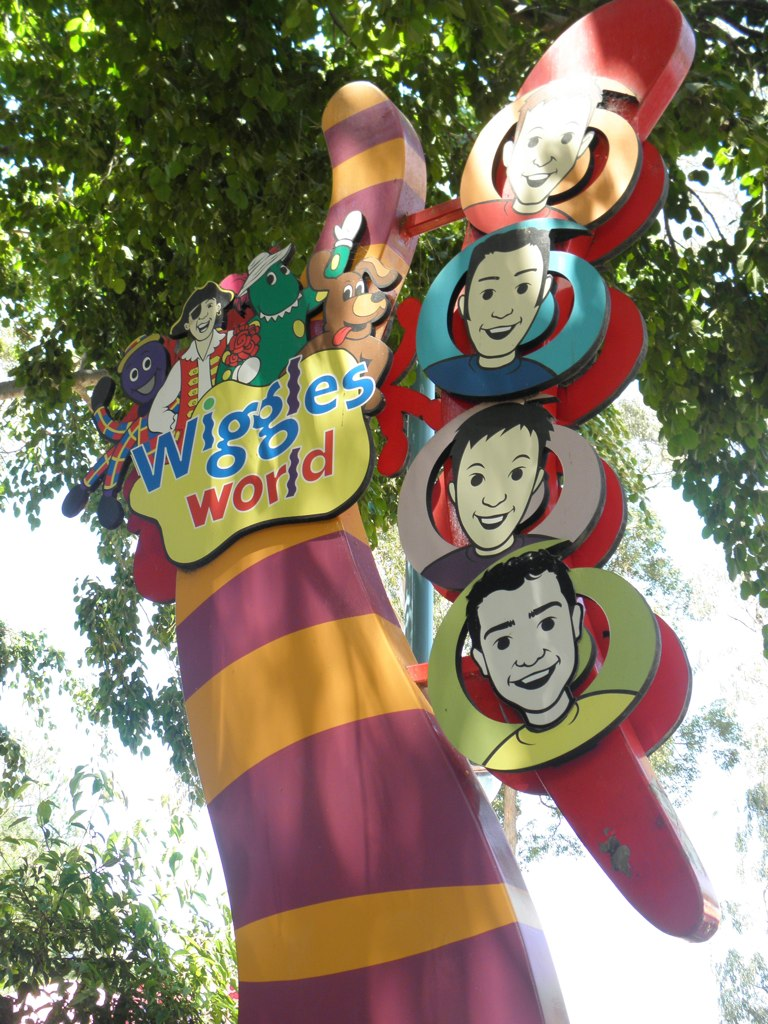
The entrance sign used during the Wiggles World era, located from Tiger Island and the Tower of Terror.

During July 2005, Gum Tree Gully was closed to aid in the construction of Dreamworld's second children's area, Wiggles World. Only a narrow corridor remained for pedestrian access during the construction period. On 17 September 2005 Wiggles World officially opened to the public with a performance by The Wiggles. Based on the musicians of the same name, the area was the first of several to be installed at theme parks around the world.

On the first anniversary of the opening of the area, Dreamworld added Dorothy's Rosy Tea Cup Ride.

In mid-2012, Dreamworld announced that they would be adding a new ride to Wiggles World. It was later revealed to be the Big Red Boat Ride. The ride was officially opened on 14 December 2012 with 7 members of The Wiggles in attendance.

In May 2015, following the successful ten-year partnership with the band, Dreamworld announced that Wiggles World would oversee a complete overhaul, expansion, and would be renamed to ABC Kids World. Alongside a majority of the Wiggles attractions, brand new attractions based on Giggle and Hoot, Play School, and Bananas in Pyjamas would be added. The "Wiggles World" name would be kept for the Wiggles section of the themed area, with its sign being moved nearer to the Wiggles attractions. The newly refurbished area opened on 27 June 2015.

On 24 November, Dreamworld announced that Rivertown, the land that previously occupied the space, would replace ABC Kids World in Late-2024, with ABC Kids attractions moving over to Kenny and Belinda's Dreamland, a re-theming of the previously-occupied DreamWorks Experience attraction that would include ABC Kids-themed attractions. ABC Kids World would close sometime in 2023 and was demolished to make way for Rivertown. The area closed on 8 October 2023 to make way for the construction of Rivertown. While the Bananas in Pyjamas Fun Maze and the Play School Wheel were relocated to Kenny and Belinda's Dreamland; the rest of the area was demolished with remaining rides all scrapped.

== Attractions ==
=== At time of closure ===
Name	Opened	Manufacturer	Type	Description	Former name(s)
ABC Kids World Fun Spot	2005	Dreamworld	Indoor activity centre	It features various interactive elements designed for children. The indoor attraction also features play kitchens, a mini supermarket, playhouses and a dress-up chest.	Fun Spot (2005–2015)
Big Red Boat Ride	2012	Zamperla	Mini Rockin' Tug	Consists of a boat following a U-shaped track whilst slowly spinning. It is similar in concept to the Shockwave but provides a gentler ride experience.	N/A
Dorothy's Rosy Tea Cup Ride	2006	SBF Visa	tea cup ride	There are six separate cups for guests to board and spin as they wish.	N/A
Giggle and Hoot Pirate Ship	2005	Dreamworld	Outdoor play area	An interactive attraction situated alongside the Murrissipi River in Dreamworld. The attraction is a façade pirate ship which is used as a children's playground.	S.S. Feathersword (2005–2015)
Play School Wheel	2018	Zamperla	Mini Ferris Wheel	After the closure of ABC Kids World, the attraction reopened in Kenny and Belinda's Dreamland on 9 December 2023.	N/A
Play School	2015	Apple Inc.	Indoor activity centre	An indoor attraction where attendees could create art on electronic tablets.	N/A

=== Former ===
Name	Opened	Closed	Manufacturer	Ride type	Description
Bananas in Pyjamas Fun Maze	2015	2023	Dreamworld	Themed Maze	The attraction relocated to the Kenny and Belinda's Dreamland area in September 2023.
Big Red Car Ride	2005	2020	Arvus Group; Simtech	Trackless dark ride	Takes 6 guests at a time on a 120-metre (390 ft) car journey through the Wiggles' house, featuring Wags' kennel, Henry's Underwater Big Band, and Dorothy's rosy garden. The trackless ride system relies upon a wire buried in the floor and allows the cars to rotate on the spot, something many track-based dark rides cannot do. The five vehicles are recharged at the station through an inductive charging system. On 12 August 2020, Dreamworld removed the attraction from their website and announced that the ride would not be reopening.
Giggle and Hoot Hop and Hoot	2015	2019	Zamperla	Jumping Star	Became a pathway for guests following removal.

== Shopping and dining ==
In addition to the attractions, ABC Kids World was home to a merchandise shop, food outlets and a photo store. The merchandise stores were:

- ABC Kids Shop (formerly known as The Wiggles Shop) – sold merchandise based on ABC Kids characters. Since late 2020, the shop has been standing but not operating for unknown reasons. The store is still listed on the park's website, however it is currently unknown when or if the store will reopen.
- Ready, Teddy, Go! – was a photo store located in the building formerly housing The Yummy Yummy Food Outlet, which closed at an unknown date. The store has been closed since 2018.

The food outlets were:

- Full of Beans – was a cafe which sold snacks and hot beverages. The café served as the main food outlet in ABC Kids World after the Yummy Yummy food outlet closed. The café has been closed since 2018.
- The Billabong Buffett Restaurant – is located right next to the former Big Red Car Ride, however is listed as part of the Dreamworld Corroboree.

== Character appearances ==
ABC Kids World gave guests the chance to meet with many costumed characters from the different shows featured in the area.

Characters who can be seen in the park include B1 & B2 from Bananas in Pyjamas, Giggle & Hoot from their titular show, and Shirley Shawn the Unicorn, Dorothy the Dinosaur, Wags the Dog, Henry the Octopus and Captain Feathersword from The Wiggles.

From time to time, live presenters from Play School and the ABC Kids strand (alongside The Wiggles) make appearances and performances at the park to advertise the area.

== Gallery ==
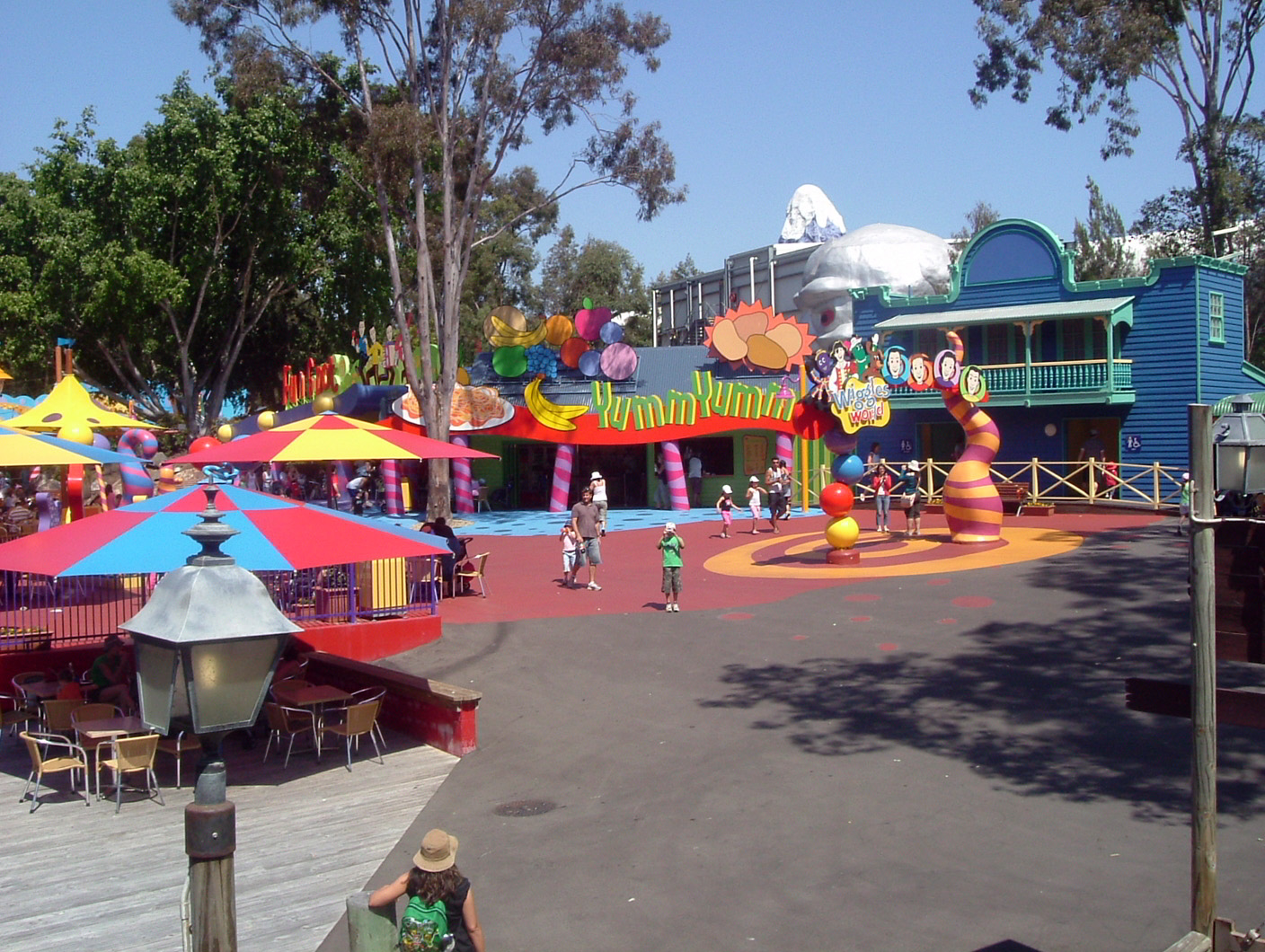
The entrance to the area (as Wiggles World) from Rivertown

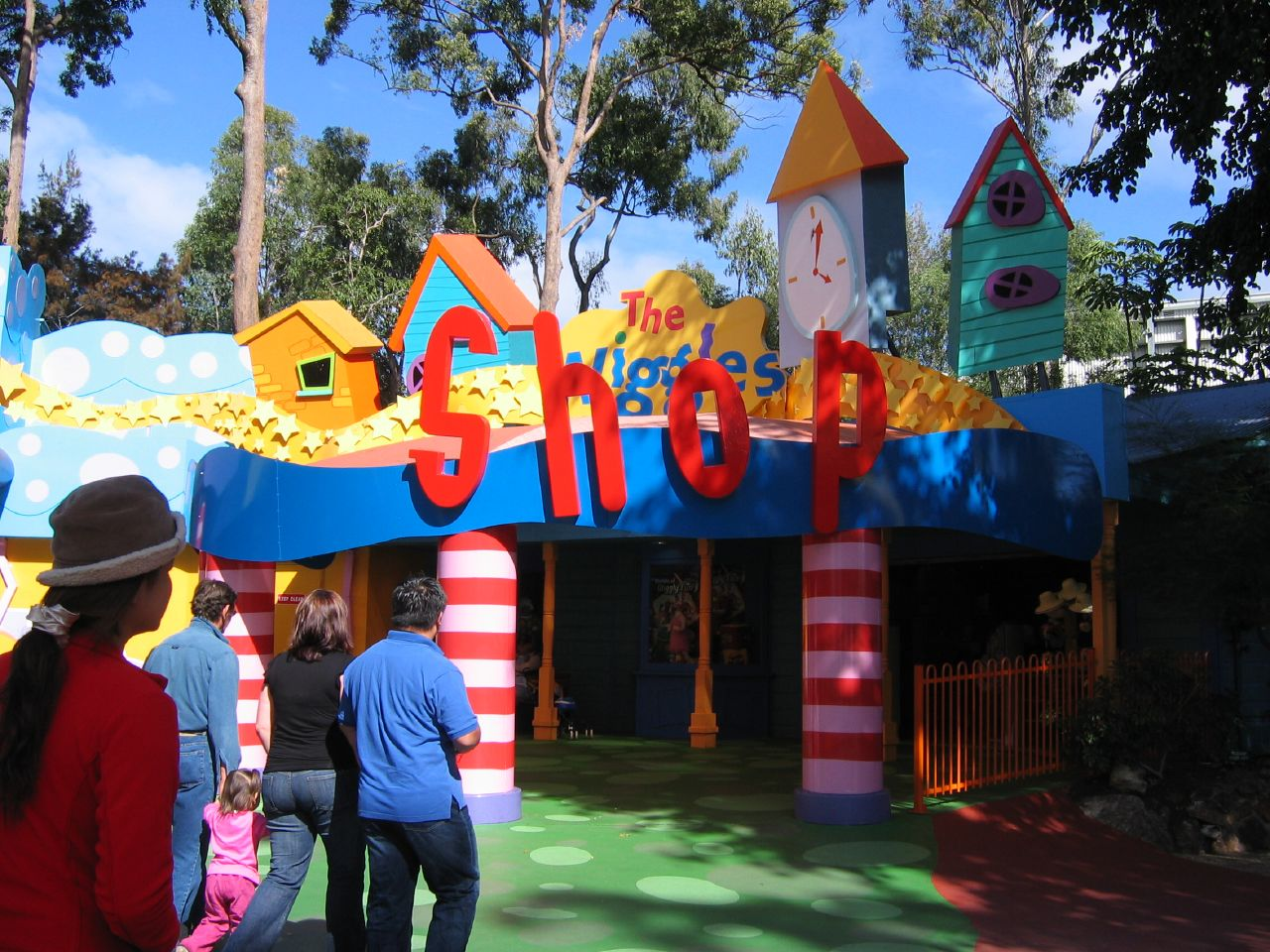
The Wiggles' Shop

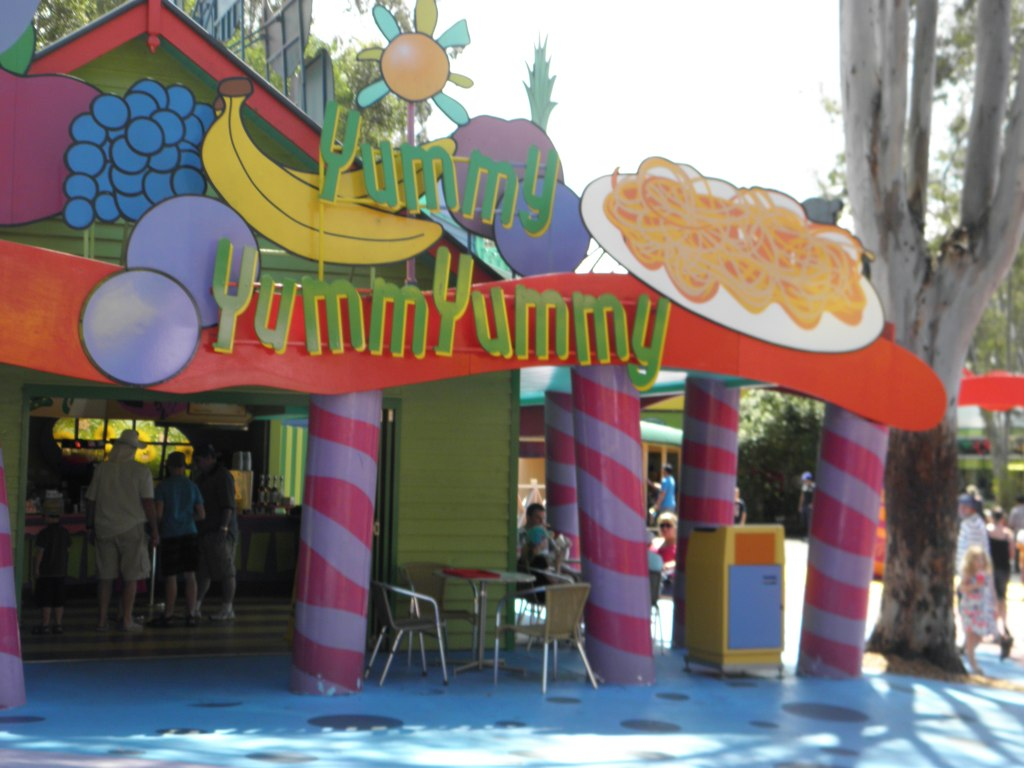
The Yummy Yummy food outlet

== Wiggles-themed areas at other amusement parks ==
On 12 December 2006, American-based amusement park operator Six Flags released plans to partner up with The Wiggles to add Wiggles World themed-areas to some of their parks. In 2007, Six Flags Great Adventure, Six Flags Great America, and Six Flags New England all opened a Wiggles World at their park. This was followed by Great Escape in 2008 and Six Flags Fiesta Texas in 2009.

In late 2010, Six Flags terminated licenses with various brands including The Wiggles. This saw the areas rethemed to the generic KIDZOPOLIS theme, while Great Adventure rethemed their Wiggles World as Safari Kids.
