= Dreamworld Corroboree =

Zoo in Queensland, Australia

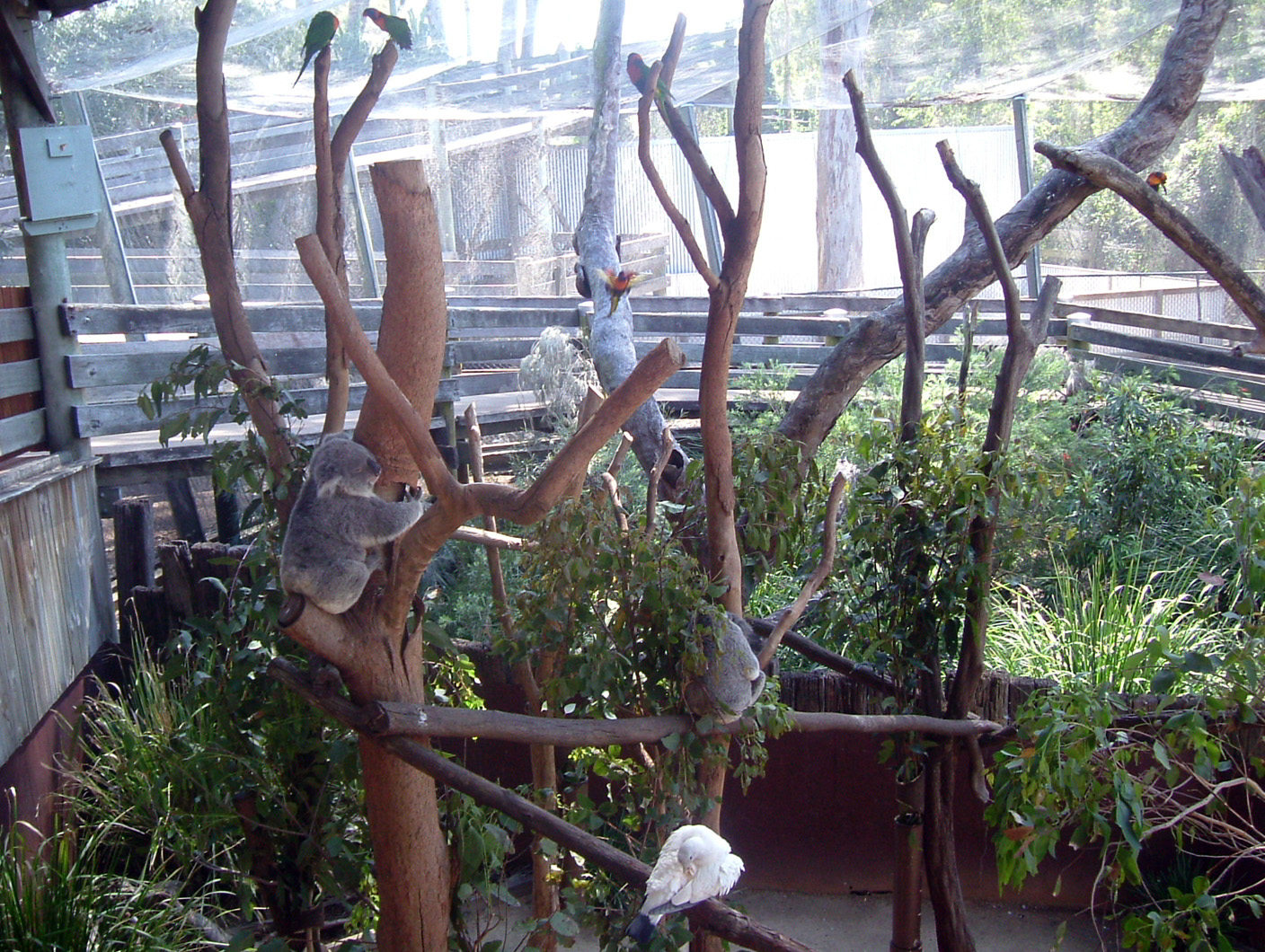
- Koalas at Dreamworld's Koala Country.
- Interactive map of Dreamworld Corroboree
- Status: Operating
- Theme: Australian wildlife and Indigenous Australia

Attractions
- Total: 14
- Other rides: 1
- Shows: 13

Dreamworld
- Coordinates: 27°51′41.98″S 153°19′6.36″E
- Opened: 1987 (as Koala Country)
- Replaced: Koala Country; Australian Wildlife Experience

Dreamworld Corroboree is a collection of wildlife attractions at the Dreamworld amusement park on the Gold Coast, Queensland, Australia. The area is divided into several subsections which allow guests to view the animals in their natural habitats. Dreamworld Corroboree is a registered zoo with 800 native and barnyard animals located within the Dreamworld grounds.

== History ==
Koala Country was Dreamworld's original wildlife exhibit, opening in 1987. After major redevelopment, the Australian Wildlife Experience opened in 2001, featuring Koala Country as one of five wildlife zones. During the redevelopment, access to Koala Country was limited. The new development required the reworking of the Dreamworld Railway tracks causing the train to drive a portion of the circuit backwards during construction. The redevelopment cost A$5 million.

On 9 July 2012 at Dreamworld, the Australian Minister for Tourism Martin Ferguson announced that the Australian Government would contribute $1.1 million to the redevelopment of the Australian Wildlife Experience into an Indigenous tourist experience. Dreamworld's owners, Ardent Leisure, vowed to match the grant to have the $2.2 million redeveloped area open by late 2013. Dreamworld has previously worked with the Indigenous community to develop the Dreamworld Dreamtime show in 2010 and 2011. Dreamworld Corroboree officially opened to the public on 12 December 2013.

In 2017, Dreamworld CEO Craig Davidson announced that the stage 2 development for the Dreamworld Corroboree would be complete. Later that year, the dormant Sky Link Chairlift stations were removed, Avis Vintage Cars underwent a refurbishment and rebranded into Vintage Car Adventure and the area added more references towards Torres Strait Islanders. An interactive smart lab was also proposed, but it never opened. The lab is still proposed as of 2021.

== Attractions ==
=== Badu ===
Badu is an outdoor show theatre dedicated to the Torres Strait Islanders which opened in 2018. Torres Strait Island performances are performed at the show theatre. Badu is located next to the Crocodile enclosure. Badu is named after the Badu Island.

=== Dreamworld Express ===
The Dreamworld Express has two stops at the Dreamworld Corroboree. The first stop is at Billabong Station which primarily serves ABC Kids World. The second is located behind the Bunya Traders gift shop. The train then continues to Rocky Hollow Station, located at the Rocky Hollow section of the Gold Rush Country area, before terminating back at Central Park Station, located at Main Street. The attraction opened in 1981 as the Cannonball Express.

=== Humpy ===
Humpy (also known as the Dreamworld Corrboree Theatre) is an exhibit featuring aboriginal art and stories. The theatre also features films produced by aboriginal musician David Hudson. The theatre also hosts aboriginal VR experiences. The building's exterior represents a humpy, a small shelter used by aboriginals.

=== Rainbow Serpent ===
The Rainbow Serpent is a tunnel located near The Giant Drop which opened in 2018. The tunnel is themed to the rainbow serpent, an immortal being and creating God in Aboriginal Mythology. The tunnel has information boards about the rainbow serpent and plays snake noises.

=== Vintage Car Adventure (former) ===
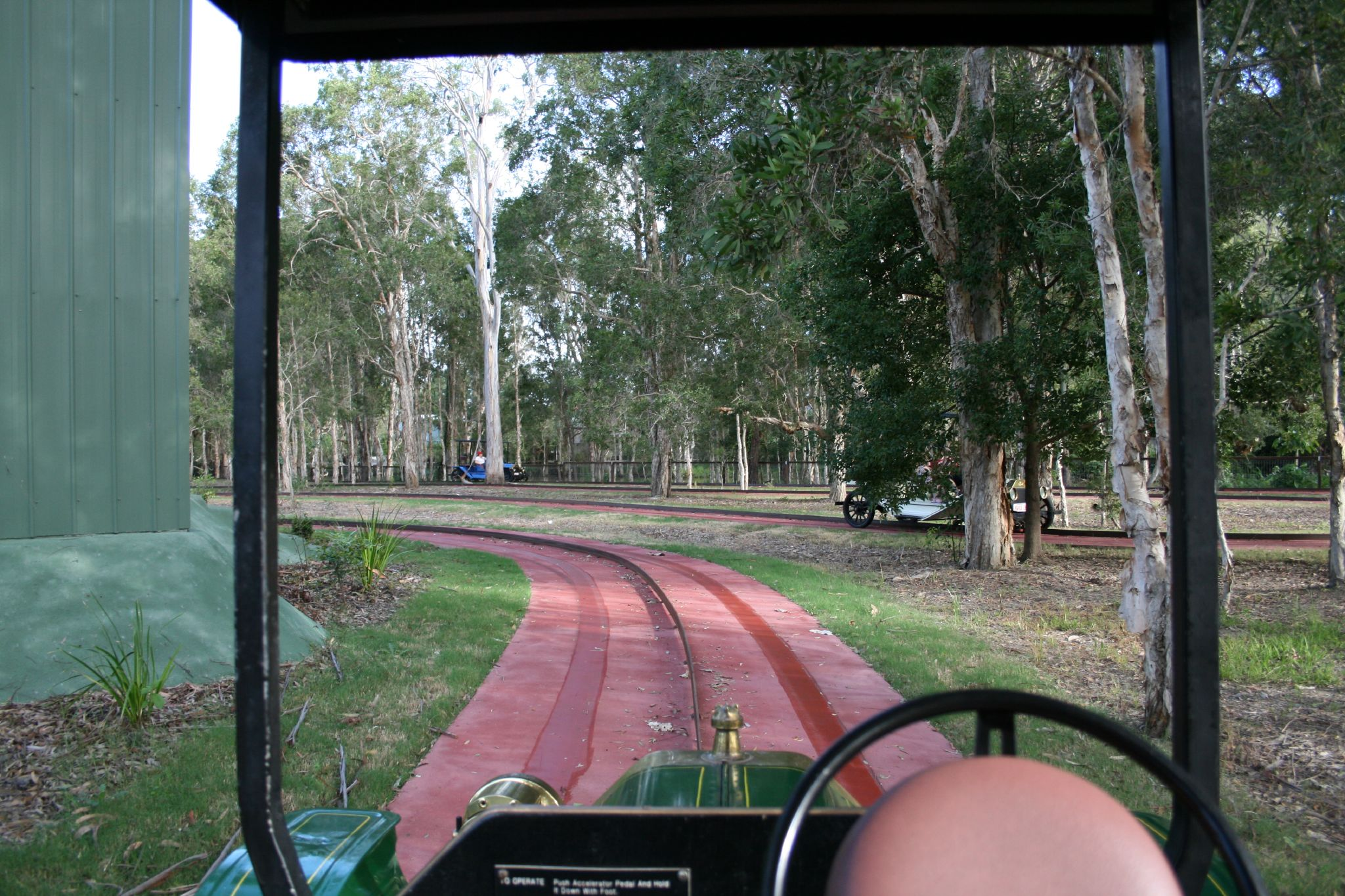
Avis Vintage Cars

Vintage Car Adventure was a fixed track car ride with scaled-down Ford Model T cars fixed onto a concrete track with a single guide rail. The ride was initially relocated from its original location due to the placement of Mick Doohan's Motocoaster ride in 2007. The ride opened in 1981 with the park in the Rivertown area of the park. The fourteen replicas cars each seat four people and were purchased for A$12,000 each. In 2024, the ride was relocated back to its original location in Rivertown.

== Wildlife exhibits ==
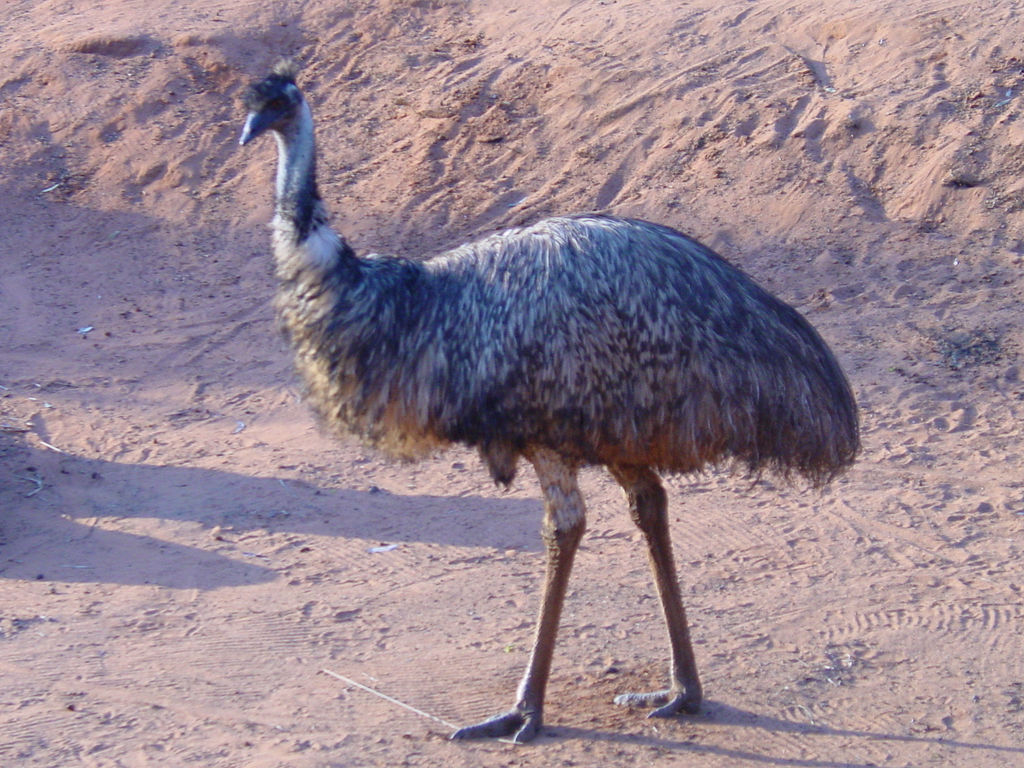
An emu at the Outback Adventure section of Dreamworld Corroboree.

=== Bilby House ===
The Bilby House is an exhibit where guests can get up close with greater bilbies. The exhibit is specifically designed for bilbies, as it is a semi-nocturnal house. The exhibit also houses fat-tailed dunnarts.

=== Daintree Rainforest ===
Daintree Rainforest is an exhibit of animals which live in tropical climates. Animals on display in this exhibit include cassowaries, red-legged pademelons, tree frogs, green tree pythons and a scrub python.

=== Dreamworld Woolshed ===
Dreamworld Woolshed is a woolshed featuring a flock of sheep and a sheepdog. The Dreamworld Woolshed is home to the Australian Sheep Shearing Show. The woolshed opened in 2010, replacing the former Farmyard Friends barn.

=== Kakadu Wetlands ===
Kakadu Wetlands is a reptile exhibit incorporating a section of Oakey Creek. It features separate pools for freshwater and saltwater crocodiles, with daily crocodile feeding presentations. The wetlands are also home to turtles, magpie gooses, common moorhens and brolgas.

=== Koala Country ===
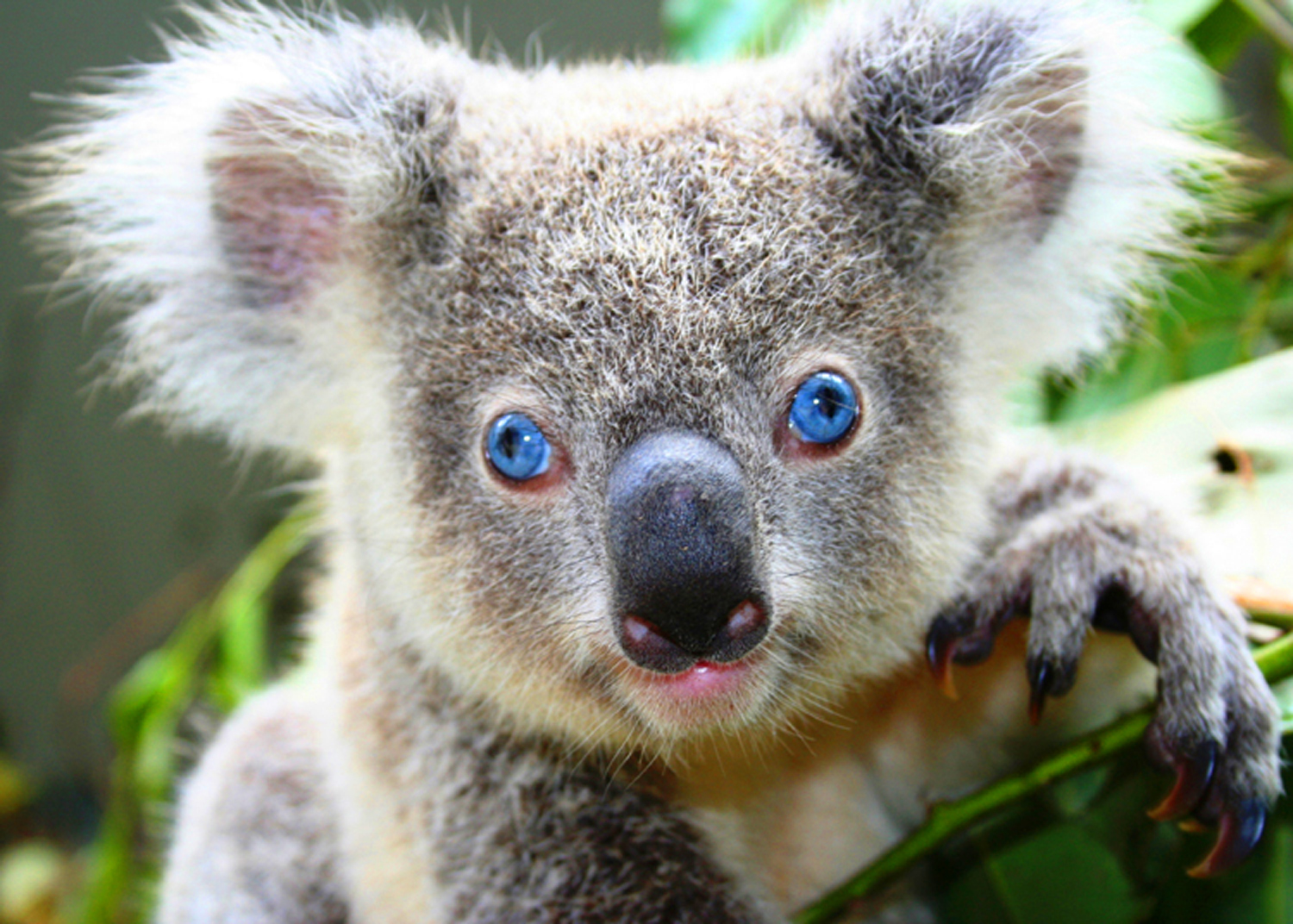
Dreamworld Corroboree has the first blue-eyed koala known to be born in captivity in the world.

Koala Country is an exhibit focusing on Dreamworld's collection of 58 koalas, including the first blue-eyed koala known to be born in captivity. The "Cuddle a Koala" feature allows guests to have a photo professionally taken holding one of the park's koalas. This section also features kangaroos which guests can feed and pet. When it first opened in 1987, Koala Country was home to just 14 koalas.

=== Outback Adventure ===
Outback Adventure is an exhibit for Australian animals native to the outback. The area houses dingos, red kangaroos, emus, southern hairy-nosed wombats, snakes, pythons, geckos, Monitor lizards, shingleback lizards and other arid lizards.

=== Twilight Trail ===
Twilight Trail is an exhibit for nocturnal wildlife. Animals on display in this exhibit include owls, squirrel gliders, Rufous Bettongs, carpet pythons and other native nocturnal wildlife.

== Presentations ==
=== Australian Sheep Shearing Show ===
Located in the Dreamworld Woolshed, the Australian Sheep Shearing Show is an interactive show held several times a day, set against an outback station and providing visitors with a taste of life on an Australian farm. It showcases the abilities of farm dogs and the shearing of a sheep. Guests get to try some damper and billy tea at the conclusion of the show.

=== Crocodile Talk ===
The Crocodile Talk is an informative animal presentation of the park's saltwater crocodiles. This presentation is held at the Kakadu Wetlands exhibit.

=== Wildlife Talk ===
The Wildlife Talk is an informative animal presentation of some of the animal located within the corroboree. The presentation is held near the Arid wildlife exhibit.

=== Other ===
Dreamworld Corroboree also features presentations based on Aboriginal culture, including demonstrations of traditional music, making fire, and cultural weapons.

The Australian Animal Presentation was a show which displayed a selection of animals from greater bilbies to crocodiles, snakes, cockatoos and koalas. Guests had the opportunity to get up close and take photographs with the wildlife. The show ran from 2009 to 2013.

== Shopping and dining ==
The Dreamworld Corroborree offers several of food and shopping outlets themed to Australian animals and indigenous Australia. Guests can purchase merchandise at:

- Bunya Traders Gift Shop (formerly Croc Creek Traders) — Indigenous Australian and Australian animal-themed merchandise
- Koala Photos — Guests can cuddle a koala and receive a photograph of them. Aboriginal-themed merchandise can also be purchased.

Guests buy food and beverage items at:

- Billabong Buffet Restaurant (formerly Riverwalk Restaurant) — A buffet restaurant
- Presto's Training Café (formerly Kai-Kai Café & formerly Kakadu Café) — Offers a variety of bush tucker-inspired food such as pies, assorted sandwiches and desserts. The café also sells its own coffee brand. The café is a unique social venture between The Preston Campbell Foundation and Dreamworld.

== See also ==
- Dreamworld Wildlife Foundation
- Tiger Island (Dreamworld)
