= Rocky Hollow (Dreamworld) =

Sub-themed area

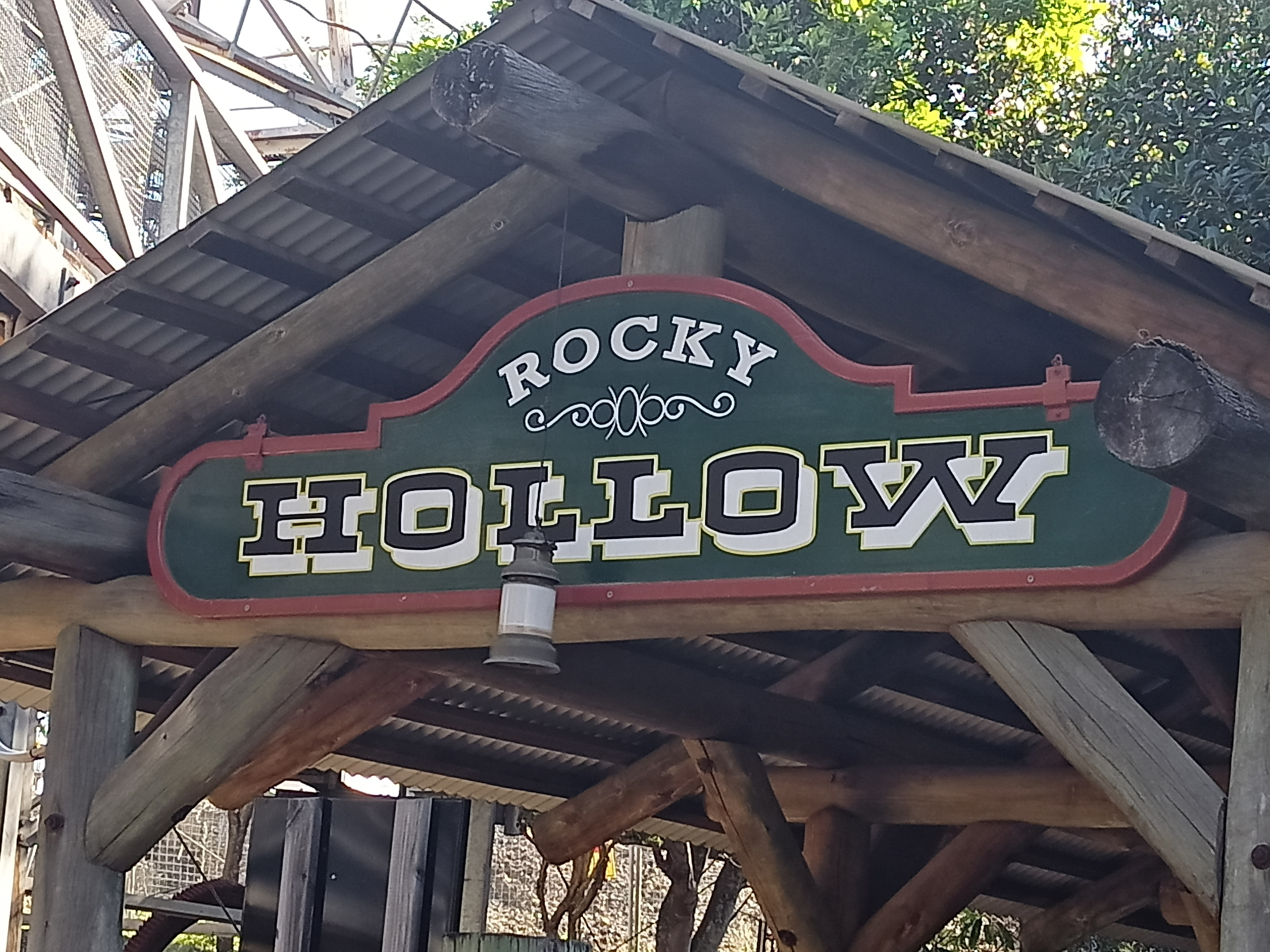
- Interactive map of Rocky Hollow
- Status: Operating
- Theme: Tree hollow

Attractions
- Total: 2
- Other rides: 2

Dreamworld
- Coordinates: 27.861653°S 153.316183°E
- Opened: 15 December 1981

Rocky Hollow is a sub-themed area at the Dreamworld amusement park on the Gold Coast, Queensland, Australia. It is currently part of the Gold Rush Country themed area and provides a link to Dreamworld Corroboree.

== History ==
Rocky Hollow opened with the park in 1981. At this time, the area's only attraction was the Rocky Hollow Log Ride which still operates today. In 1998, the world's tallest free fall ride opened in the area. Standing at 120 metres (390 ft) high, the Giant Drop accelerates riders at speeds of up to 135 kilometres per hour (84 mph). During the 2010s, Rocky Hollow was integrated into Gold Rush Country.

== Attractions ==
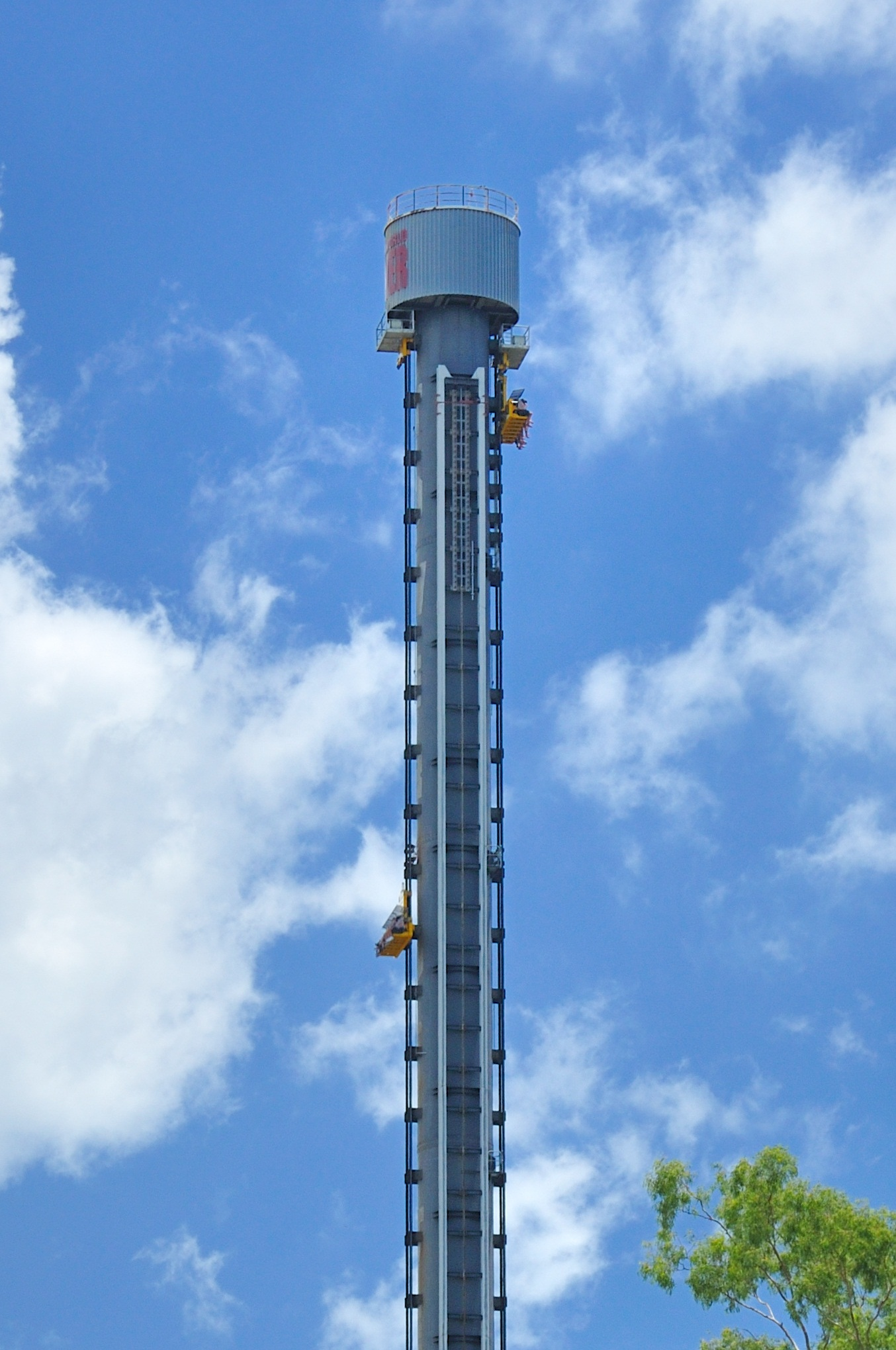
The Dreamworld Tower housing The Giant Drop

=== Current attractions ===
==== Dreamworld Express ====
The Dreamworld Express is one of Dreamworld's original, opening day attractions. At opening the ride was known as the Cannon Ball Express and only featured one stop in Main Street. The stop in Rocky Hollow is the fourth and final stop before the train returns to Main Street. Other stops include Billabong Station and Australian Wildlife Experience Station. The railway has two trains. The first is a Perry with the second being a Baldwin. Due to high levels of maintenance it is very rare that both trains operate on the same day.

==== Giant Drop ====
The Giant Drop opened in 1998 as the world's tallest and fastest free fall ride. It is one of Dreamworld's Big 7 Thrill Rides and is situated on the Dreamworld Tower. The ride was manufactured by Intamin, the company responsible for the Tower of Terror which shares the same tower.

=== Former attractions ===
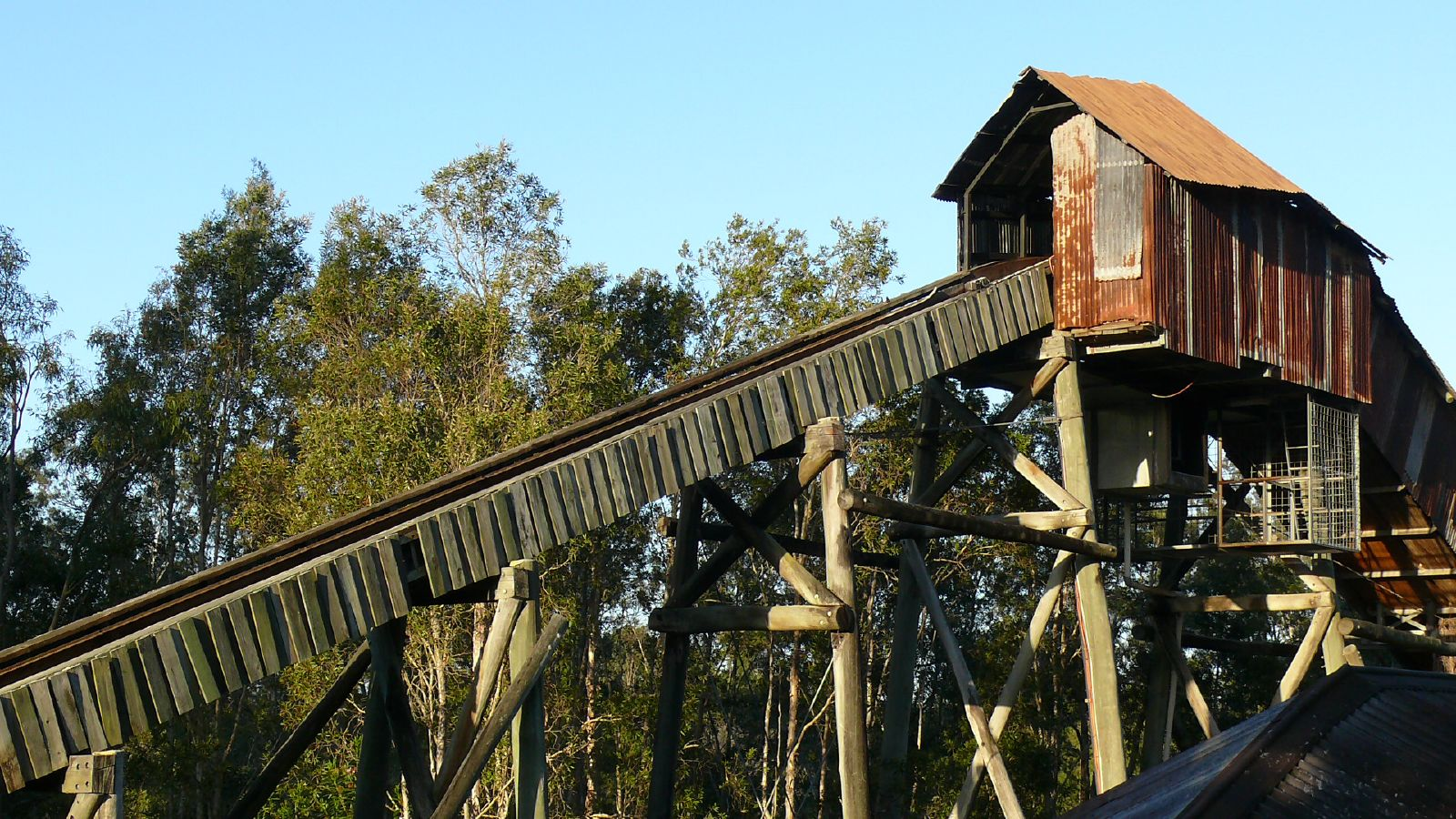
The second and final drop on the Rocky Hollow Log Ride

==== Rocky Hollow Log Ride ====
The Rocky Hollow Log Ride was a log flume which took groups of 4 riders on a gentle four and a half-minute cruise through channels, in and out of buildings, before ascending the lift hill. The ride concluded with a 50 kilometres per hour (31 mph) drop causing all riders to become soaked. The ride was designed and built in-house by Dreamworld with assistance from overseas engineers.

== Shopping and dining ==
Rocky Hollow features only on-ride photo shops for the Giant Drop and Log Ride. It originally featured a food & beverage option but that has since been converted into the Log Ride photo store.
