= Dreamworld Wildlife Foundation =

Non-governmental organization

- Formation: March 2012; 14 years ago
- Type: International non-governmental organisation
- Purpose: Environmentalism; Conservation; Ecology
- Headquarters: Dreamworld, Gold Coast, Australia
- Region served: Worldwide
- Methods: Lobbying; research; consultancy
- Owner: Ardent Leisure
- Key People: Albano Mucci
- Directors: David Haslingden; Greg Yong; Guy O'Brien; Martin Holslag
- Secretary: Brownyn Weir
- General manager: Michele Barnes
- Parent organisation: Dreamworld
- Subsidiaries: Koala Land
- Affiliations: Fauna & Flora International
- Revenue: A$ 2 million (2012–)
- Website: www.dwf.com.au

The Dreamworld Wildlife Foundation (DWF) is an international non-governmental organisation founded in 2012. The foundation is based at the Dreamworld amusement park on the Gold Coast, Australia. DWF primarily focuses on animal welfare.

The DWF has launched several projects primarily focusing on bilbies, koalas, tigers and tree kangaroos along with other animals based at the Dreamworld Corroboree and Tiger Island.

== History ==
Dreamworld had previously run the Dreamworld Tiger Fund from 1997 and had raised over A$1 million over 15 years. The fund relied on merchandise sales, tiger photos and donations from Dreamworld guests. The DWF was established in March 2012, collaborating with existing wildlife conservation groups to bring substantial financial support to the conservation movement on a global scale. Since its foundation, the DWF has launched several projects and has raised over A$2 million from merchandise sales, animal encounters and donations. Since its foundation, the DWF has become the world's largest tiger donor. In March 2021, Dreamworld's General Manager of Life Science, Al Mucci resigned from the DWF. He was replaced by Michelle Barnes.

== Organisation ==
=== Partnership ===
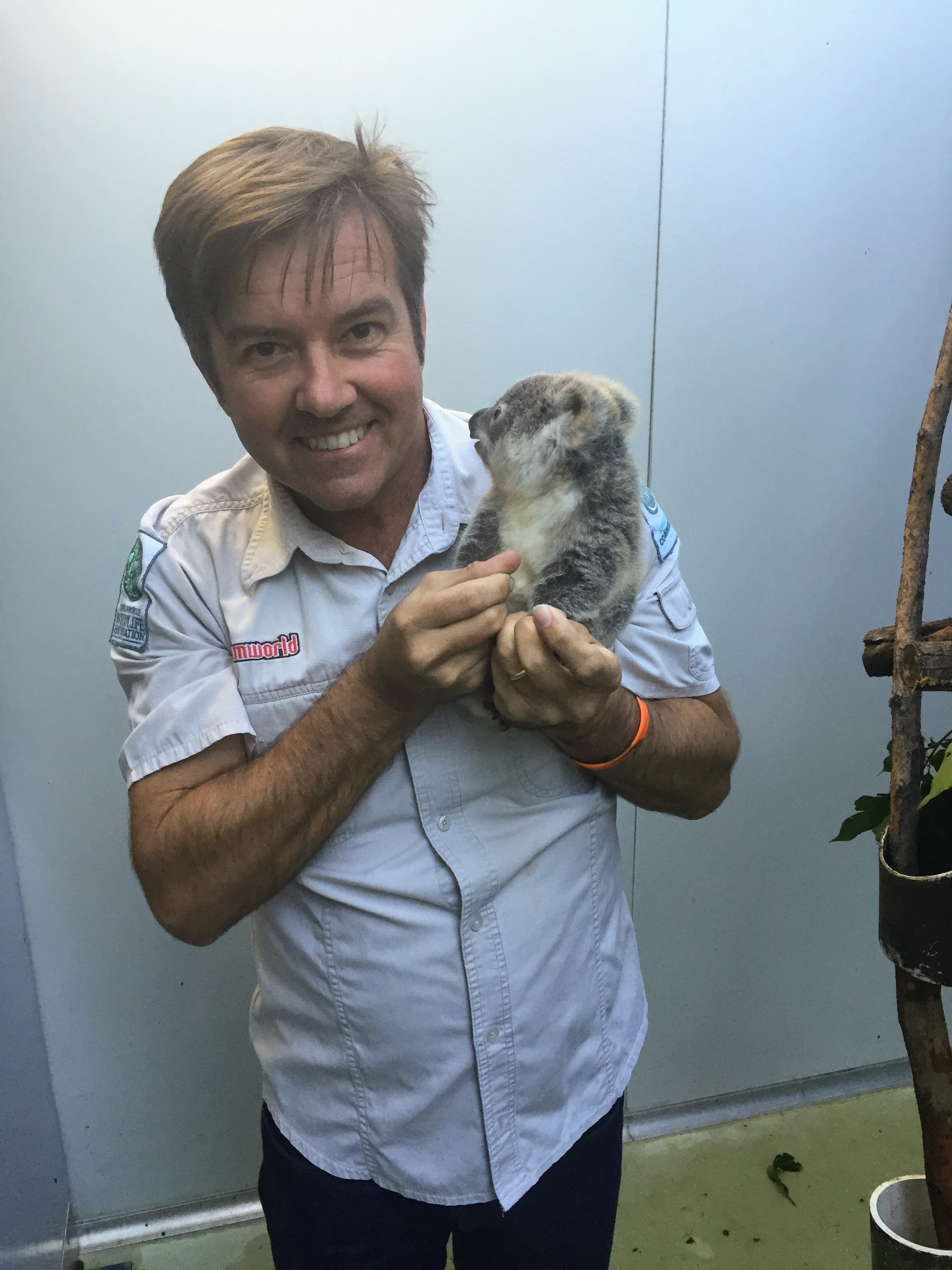
Al Mucci

The DWF has partnered with several other organisations to help contribute to their projects. The DWF is part of the WildCats Conservation Alliance which aims to help tigers and amur leopards. The DWF also partners with the Phoenix Fund, Fauna & Flora International, Tree Roo Rescue and Conservation Centre and the Save the Bilby Fund. The University of Queensland and the DWF also researches on the koala reproductive cycle and they have developed the world's first artificial breeding technology.

=== List of managers ===
Years	Name
2012–2020	Al Mucci
2020–	Michele Barnes

== Projects ==
=== Bilbies ===
The DWF along with the Save the Bilby fund help to raise money to spread awareness of the steady decline of the bilby population. The fund also helps contribute to education, research and action towards securing a long term conservation towards bilbies.

=== Koalas ===
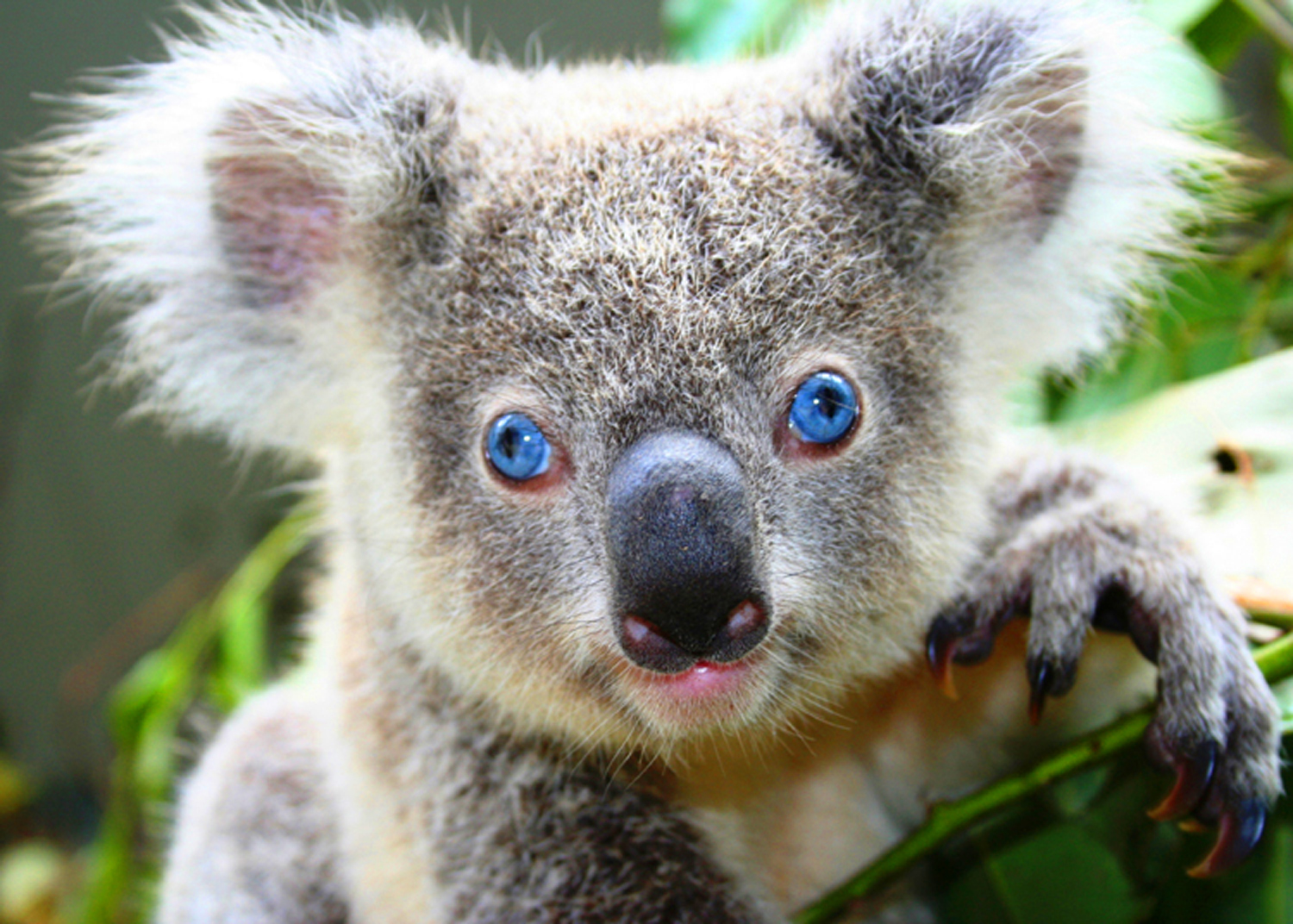
Dreamworld Corroboree has the first blue-eyed koala known to be born in captivity in the world.

The DWF launched a project, Koala Land, which focuses on collaborating to help save koalas and their habitats in Southeast Queensland. The project was created with Al Mucci, the General Manager of Life Science at Dreamworld. The DWF does research along with The University of Queensland on koala habitats. Dreamworld also does a wildlife presentation at the Dreamworld Corroboree where guests are informed about Australian animals and the endangered species.

=== Tigers ===
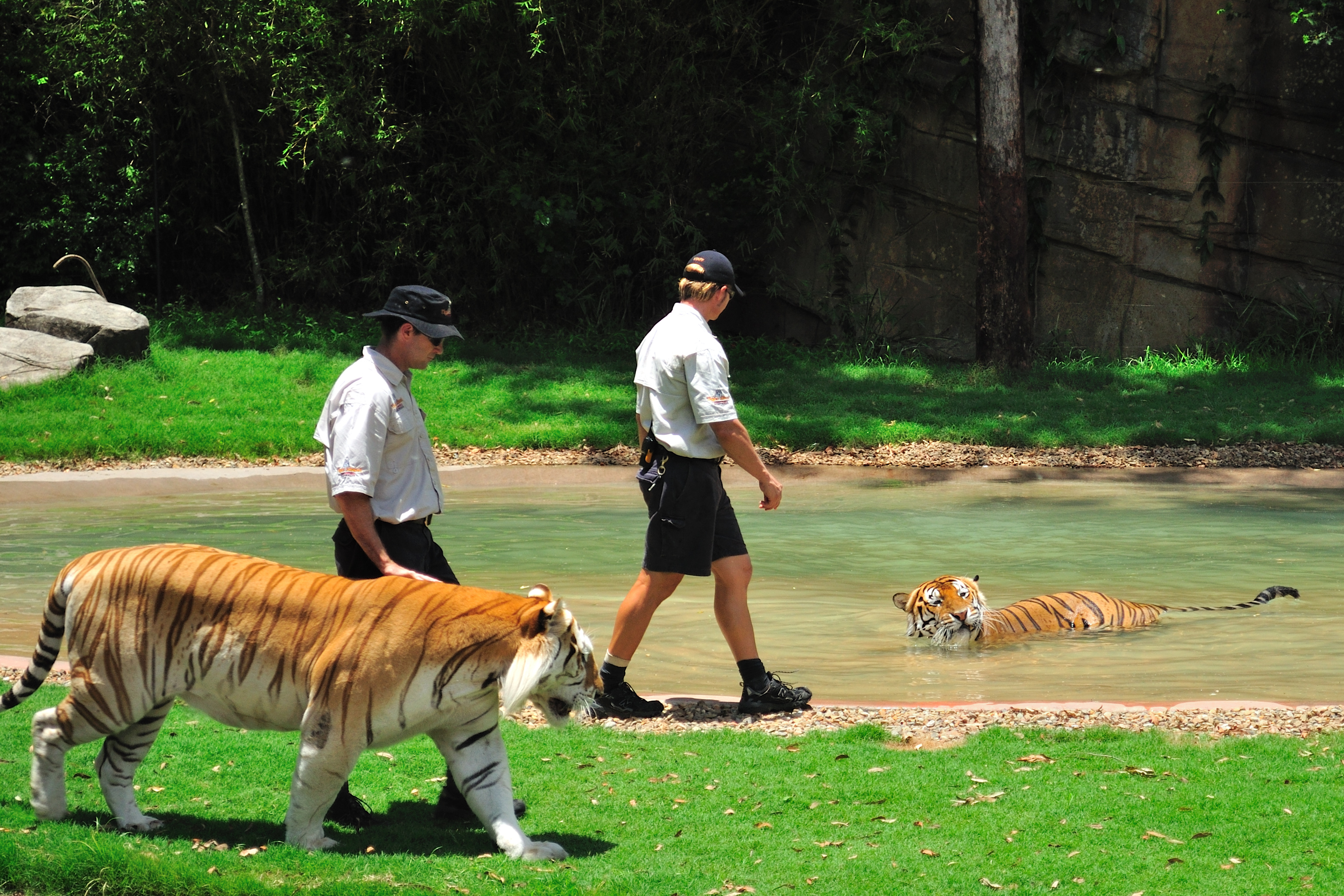
Tigers at Dreamworld's Tiger Island

The DWF is part of the Wild Cats Conservation Alliance. The alliance helps save wild tigers and Amur leopards around the world. DWF’s parent company, Dreamworld, has a dedicated area to tigers called Tiger Island. At the end of every Tiger Island Presentation, Dreamworld spreads awareness of issues with poaching of tigers and other animals.

=== Tree kangaroos ===
The DWF along with the Tree Roo Rescue and Conservation Centre help rehabilitate orphaned and injured tree kangaroos for release back into the wild. They also help spread awareness of the tree kangaroo and they research into a disease, known as the blindness disease, which affects tree kangaroos.

== Programs ==
The DWF runs several animal encounters at Dreamworld. The encounter included: a 15 minutes dingo experience, tiger feed experience and koala photos. The profits made by the encounters help contribute to the foundation.
