= Rivertown (Dreamworld) =

Themed area

- Interactive map of Rivertown
- Status: Operating
- Theme: Jungle themed river town

Attractions
- Total: 2
- Roller coasters: 1
- Other rides: 1

Dreamworld
- Coordinates: 27.863294°S 153.317267°E
- Opened: 15 December 1981 (original); 23 December 2024 (present)(reopening)
- Closed: 2010s (original)
- Replaced: ABC Kids World
- Replaced by: Merged with ABC Kids World and Main Street

Rivertown is a themed area at the Dreamworld amusement park on the Gold Coast, Queensland, Australia. It replaced the former ABC Kids World and provides a link between Main Street, the Dreamworld Corroboree and Tiger Island. The area previously existed from the park's opening in 1981 until being merged into Main Street in the 2010s.

== History ==
Rivertown opened with the park in 1981. The area originally was home to the Avis Vintage Cars which had later been relocated to the Australian Wildlife Experience. The Avis Vintage Cars were located where Mick Doohan's Motocoaster currently exists. At opening the area was home to the Captain Sturt Paddle Wheeler (John Longhurst's signature attraction) and the Avis Vintage Cars. In 2012, the Captain Sturt Paddle Wheeler ceased operations.

On 24 November 2022, Dreamworld announced that Rivertown would be returning, replacing the existing ABC Kids World which took over much of the original Rivertown's footprints. ABC Kids World closed on 8 October 2023, with the construction of Rivertown commencing. The area officially opened on 23 December 2024, with Jungle Rush, Murrissippi Motors and Jane’s Rivertown Restaurant.

== Attractions ==
=== Current attractions ===
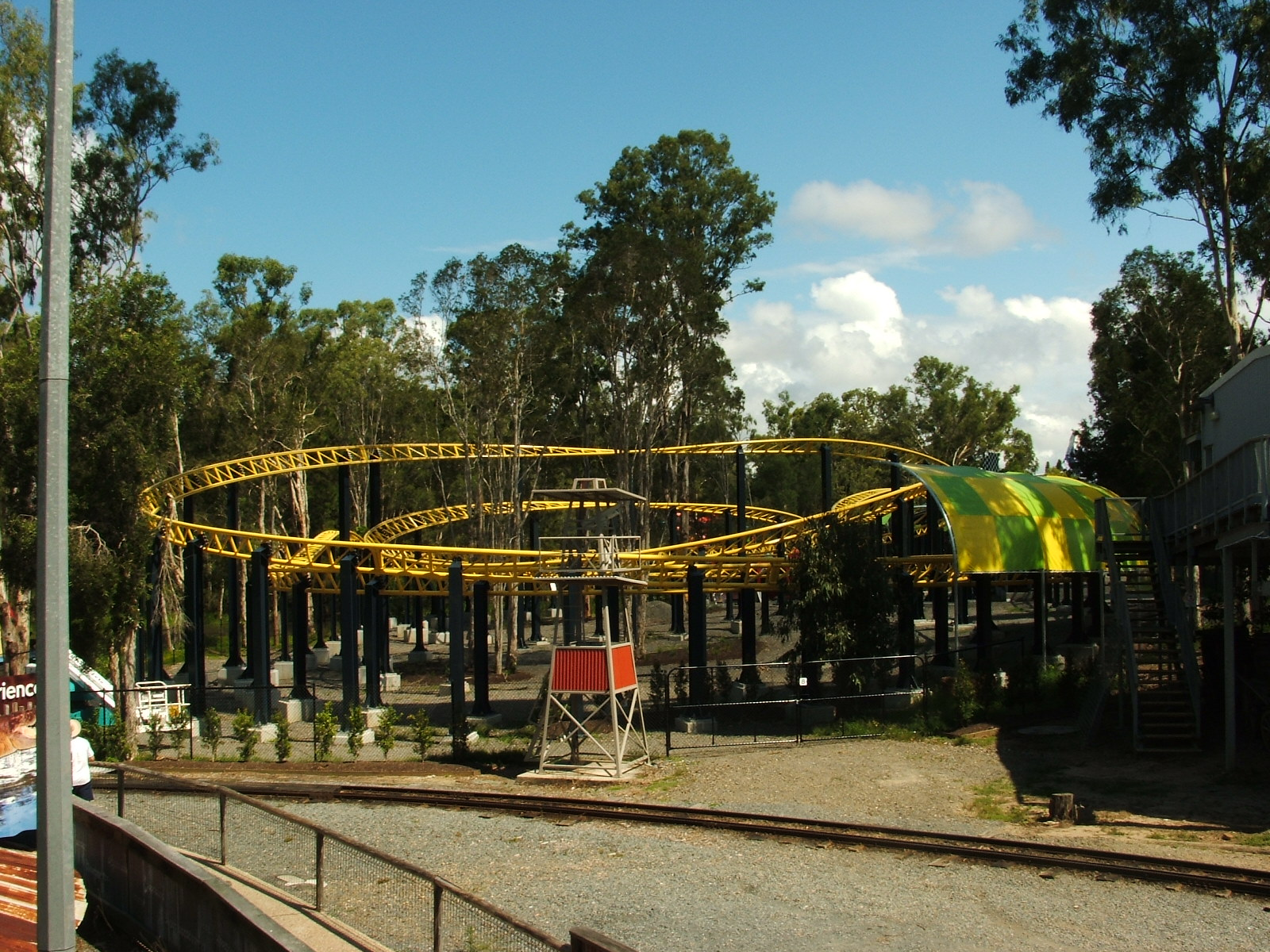
Mick Doohan's Motocoaster

- Jungle Rush is a temple-themed Vekoma family roller coaster. The ride has 12 airtime elements, dedicated show movements, the ability to operate in both a forwards and backwards direction, and immersive theming with storytelling. The ride officially opened on 23 December 2024 with the return of Rivertown.
- Motocoaster is an Intamin Motorbike Launch Roller Coaster named after the Moto GP champion Michael Doohan. Although being classified as one of Dreamworld's Big 8 Thrill Rides, the ride failed to gain support within its first year of operation. Motocoaster still operates as part of Main Street.
- Murrissippi Motors is a vintage cars attraction where guests can ride in replicas of 1911 Model T Fords. In 2007, the attraction was relocated to the Australian Wildlife Experience area (now Dreamworld Corroboree). The attraction returned to Rivertown in 2024 and received a refurbishment and retheme, now featuring a former RAAF Caribou A4-179 aircraft.

=== Former attractions ===
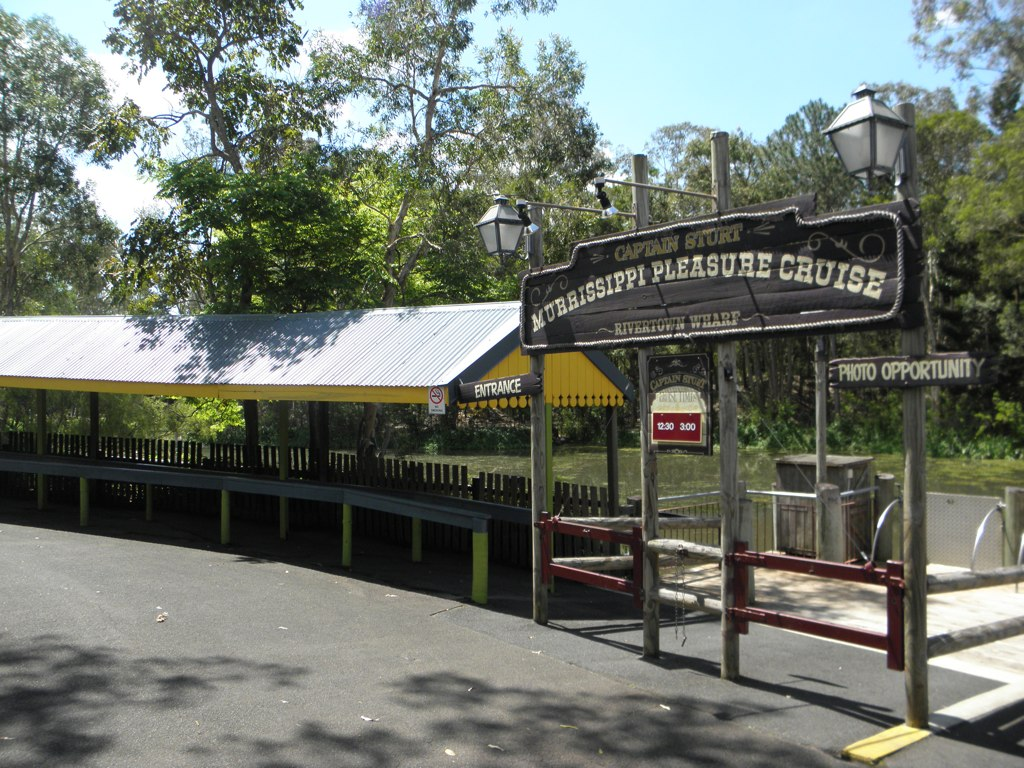
The Rivertown Wharf (entrance to Captain Sturt Paddle Wheeler) in 2011.

- The Captain Sturt Paddle Wheeler was a operational paddle wheeler. When it was operating, it was a gentle boat ride along the man-made Murrissipi River. The ride is of a similar style to the Mark Twain Riverboat at several Disney theme parks around the world. The ride opened with the park in 1981. The channel which the boat tours is called the Murrissipi River and took Dreamworld founder, John Longhurst, two years to construct working seven 12-hour days a week. The ride originally featured a bush show themed to the era of Ned Kelly. This was discontinued when Farmyard Friends was constructed during 2005. The attraction closed in 2012.

== Shopping & Dining ==
Food and beverages are available at:

- Jane’s Rivertown Restaurant – a jungle-themed restaurant, featuring several animatronic animals, a themed boat bar, and several past Dreamworld relics such as old posters featuring the former Tower of Terror II and Wipeout attractions.

Rivertown and Motocoaster-themed merchandise can be purchased at:

- The Rivertown General Store – a merchandise store which Rivertown-themed merchandise as well as Motocoaster-themed merchandise can be purchased. Motocoaster and Murrissippi Motors on-ride photos are also available here.

Food and beverage items were formerly available at the Fast Foods restaurant.
