= Albano Mucci =

Australian activist and conservationist (born 1968)

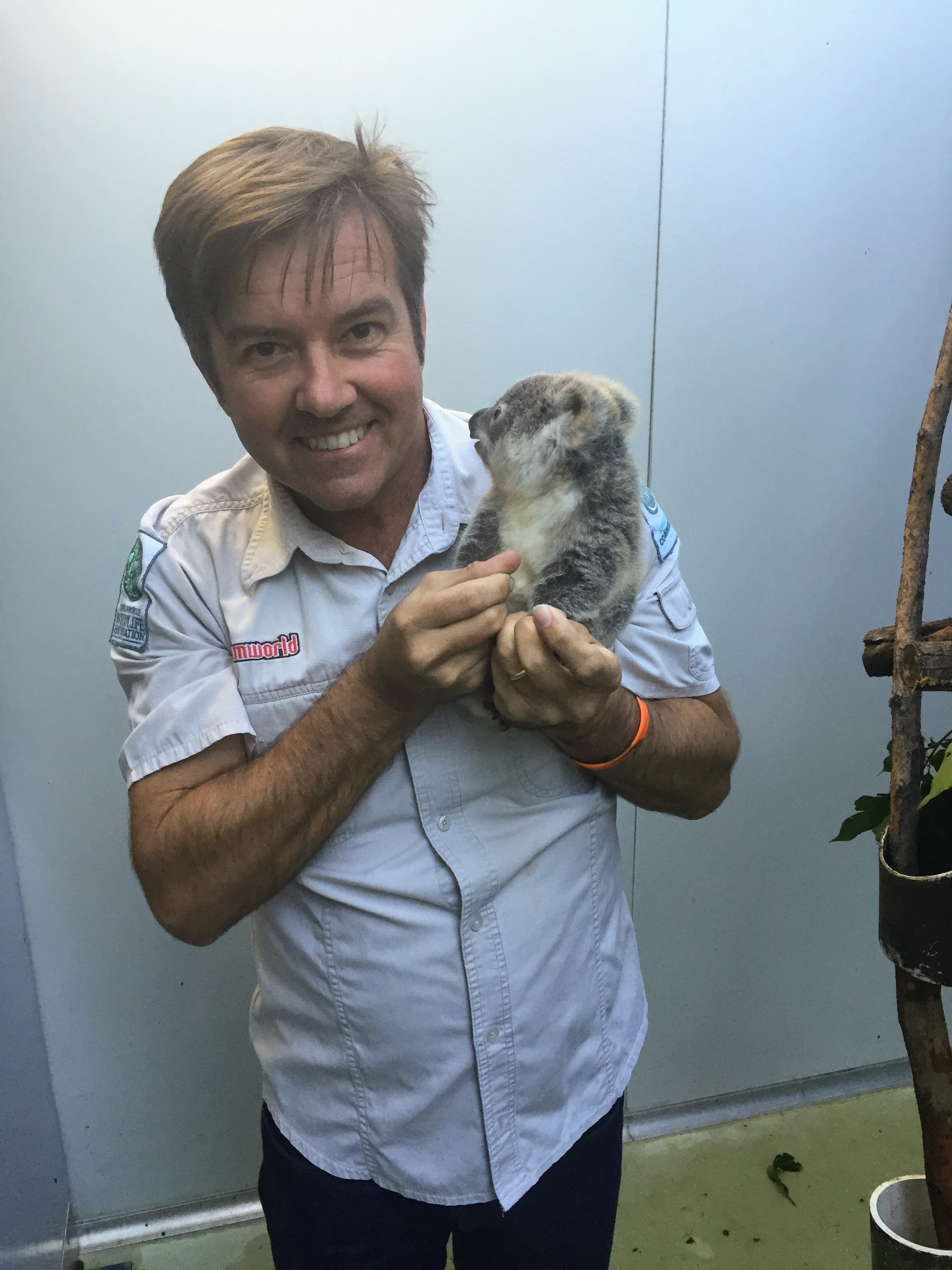
Albano Mucci and koala joey

Albano Mucci (born 30 December 1968), known as Al Mucci and Wildlife Al. Albano is a champion for environmental management and animal conservation and social justice for Australia's Indigenous Peoples.

== Early life ==
Mucci was born in Auburn, New South Wales, Australia to Australian immigrants (mother Maria Mucci (née Radovnicovich), father Albano Mucci)

== Contributions to science ==
=== Scientific Papers ===
The following are scientific papers that Albano Mucci has contributed to and that have been published:

- Plasma prolactin concentrations during lactation, pouch young development and the return to behavioural oestrus in captive koalas (Phascolarctos cinereus)
- The use of a progestin, levonorgestrel, to control the oestrous cycle in the koala
- Use of the gonadotrophin-releasing hormone antagonist azaline B to control the oestrous cycle in the koala (Phascolarctos cinereus)
