= Motocoaster (Dreamworld) =

Motorcycle roller coaster at Dreamworld

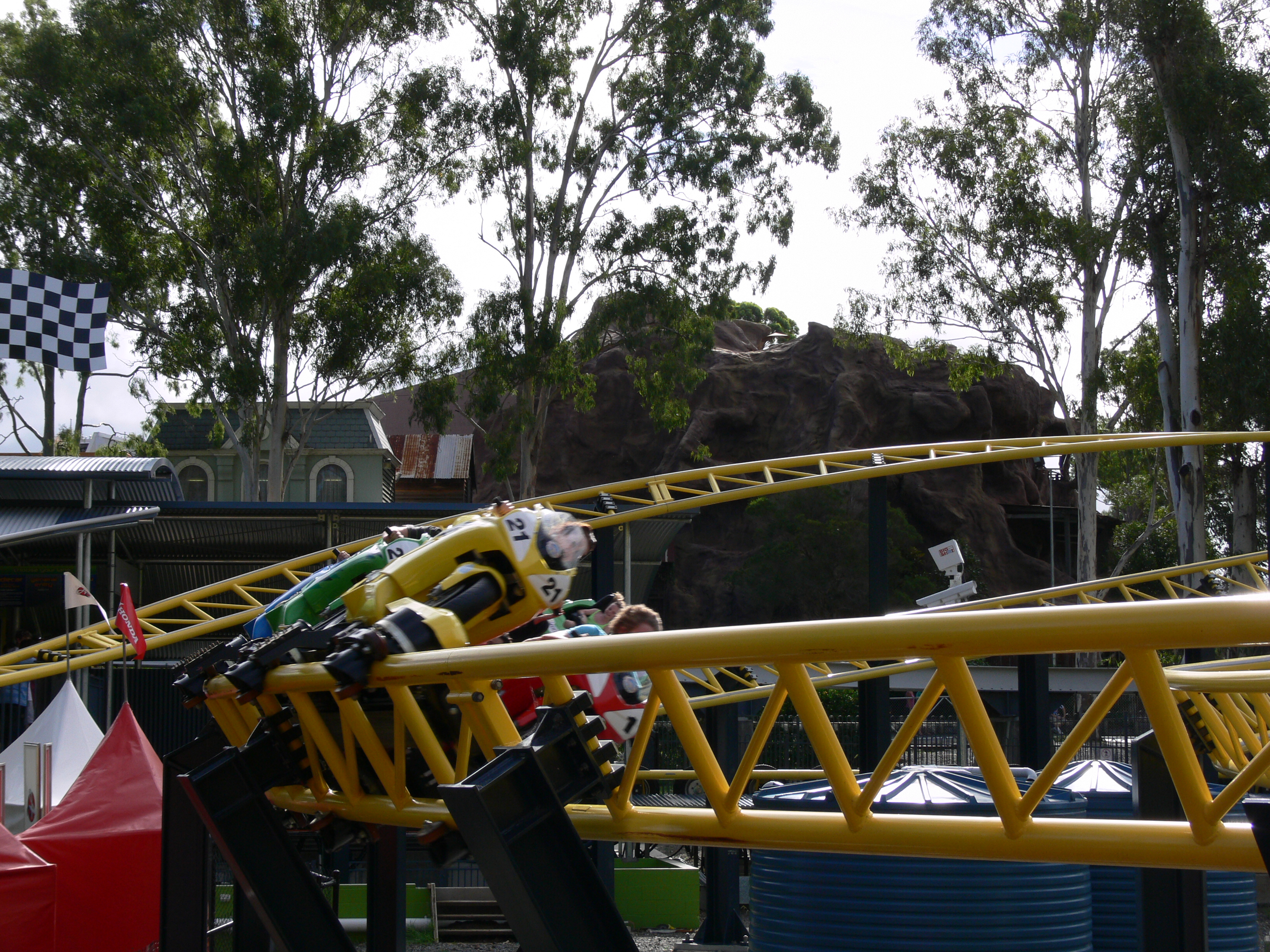
- A view of the coaster from the queue

Dreamworld
- Location: Dreamworld
- Park section: Main Street
- Coordinates: 27°51′46″S 153°19′1″E
- Status: Closed
- Opening date: 30 September 2007
- Closing date: 2 February 2026
- Cost: A$10,000,000

General statistics
- Type: Steel – Launched – Motorbike
- Manufacturer: Intamin
- Model: Family MotorBike Launch Coaster
- Lift/launch system: Tire Propelled Launch
- Height: 7 m (23 ft)
- Length: 605 m (1,985 ft)
- Speed: 72 km/h (45 mph)
- Duration: 55 sec
- Capacity: 746 riders per hour
- Acceleration: 0 to 72 km/h in 2 seconds
- Height restriction: 110 cm (3 ft 7 in)
- Trains: 2 trains with 8 cars; riders arranged 2 across in a single row for a total of 16 riders per train
- Previous name: Mick Doohan's Motocoaster (2007–2022)
- Ride Express available
- Single rider line available
- Motocoaster at RCDB

Motocoaster was a 605-metre (1,985 ft) long motorcycle roller coaster at Dreamworld on the Gold Coast, Queensland, Australia. The A$10 million ride, constructed by Intamin and opened to the public in September 2007, was associated with Australian motorcyclist Mick Doohan until 2022. It is the first motorcycle coaster in Australia, the first Intamin MotorBike Launch Coaster worldwide, and the first to feature life-size replicas of 500 cc racing bikes.

On 15 January 2026, Dreamworld announced the retirement and permanent closure of the ride from 2 February 2026, with the last operating day being 1 February 2026.

== History ==
=== Construction ===
The coaster was constructed in the Rivertown section of the park, on the site of the Avis Vintage Cars ride, requiring their relocation to the Australian Wildlife Experience section of the park. The ride was the first constructed at Dreamworld in three years.

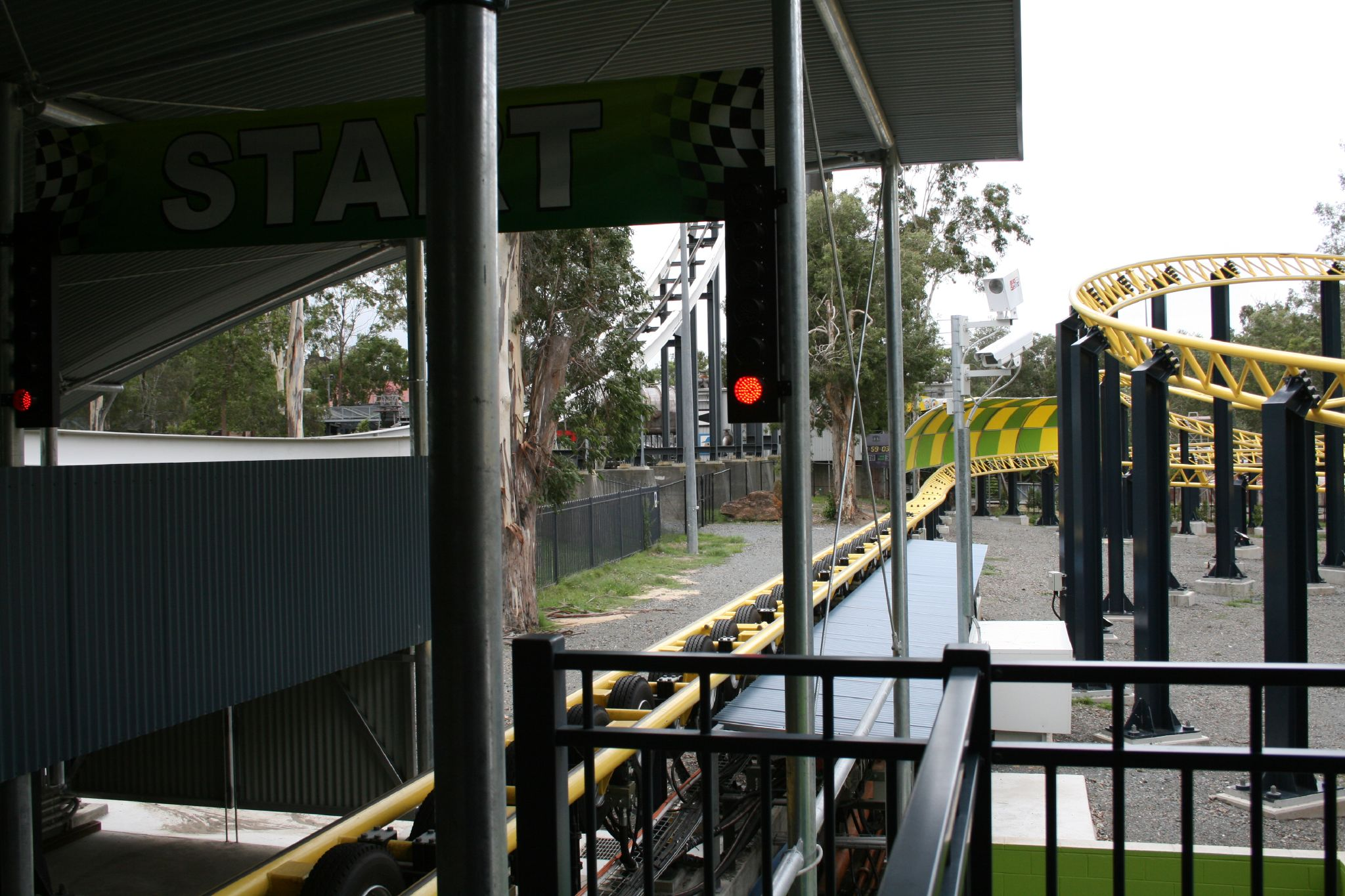
Looking along the tire drive launch track.

=== Opening ===
The coaster opened to the public on 30 September 2007. Margaret Keech, The current minister for the Gold Coast, and Stacey McMahon, a 125 cc rider and spokesperson for the GMC Australian Grand Prix, were there for the ribbon-cutting ceremony. Mick Doohan did not personally attend the event due to participation in the Japan Grand Prix, but submitted a pre-recorded video in which he stated: "I am extremely proud to see the end result, I have really enjoyed working with Dreamworld, the new attraction truly celebrates and pays respect to a great Australian sport and its achievements."

=== Closure ===
On the 2nd December 2025, Dreamworld announced the ride would close from February 2nd 2026. The announcement caused mixed receptions from guests, with some sad to see it go, while others were excited for its replacement.

=== Replacement ===
On the 18th of August 2026, the park announced a retheme of the attraction to Lost Mine Mayhem. The retheme is set to replace the original launch system, greatly improve theming, and better tie the attraction into the adjacent Rivertown precinct. Lost Mine Mayhem is slated to open in late 2027.

== Financial impact ==
Marketing for the ride contributed to a decline in Dreamworld's operating margins during the final two-quarters of 2007.

Through to 26 March 2008, the ride is credited with increasing Dreamworld's revenue by 8.8% to A$50.68 million. Park attendance by local residents spiked significantly following the launch of the coaster, although there was a decline in both interstate and international visitors during the same period.

== Ride mechanics ==
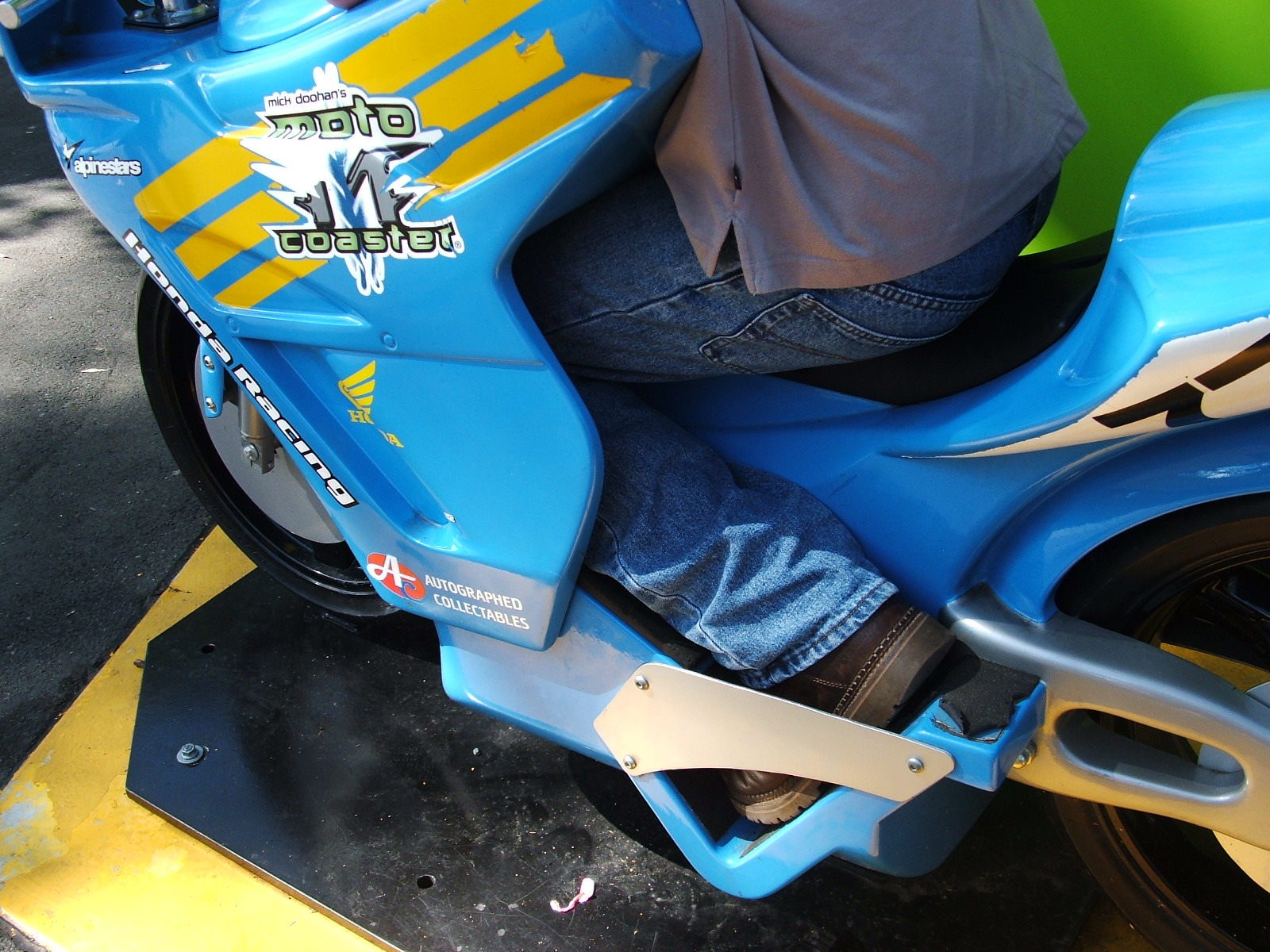
Testing unit at the start of the queue for the coaster. The photograph shows how the rider is restrained.

The ride is an Intamin MotorBike Launch Coaster. The track is 605 metres (1,985 ft) long and features 18 banks, bends, and turns. Riders sit on full-scale replica 500 cc racing bikes arranged in eight cars with two riders per car. This includes 14 motorcycle seats and two sidecar seats in the rear. There are two trains, which are launched by a flywheel track. The sidecars were initially designed to be in the middle of the trains. Riders are held on the ride through a clamshell restraint system, where the top part of the bike folds over the rider's legs.

The ride has two cameras: one on the launch run, the other halfway through the ride. The ride's queue features informational decorations that teach about the history of motorcycle racing. Riders must be 135 centimetres (53 in) in height to ride on the main motorcycle cars and 110 centimetres (43 in) tall to ride in the sidecars. The ride is estimated to handle 746 passengers per hour, and has a launch speed of 72 kilometres per hour (45 mph) in two seconds due to its hydraulic system, the second of its kind worldwide.

== Reception ==
In its debut year, the coaster was "narrowly beaten by a 1989 Vekoma ride for the title of world's worst steel roller coaster": the coaster ranked 356th out of the 357 coasters in the Best Steel Roller Coaster Poll. The ride was rated higher in 2008, coming in at number 278 of 392.

== See also ==
- Jet Rescue
