= Fury of the Nile =

River rapids ride at Worlds of Fun in Kansas City, Missouri

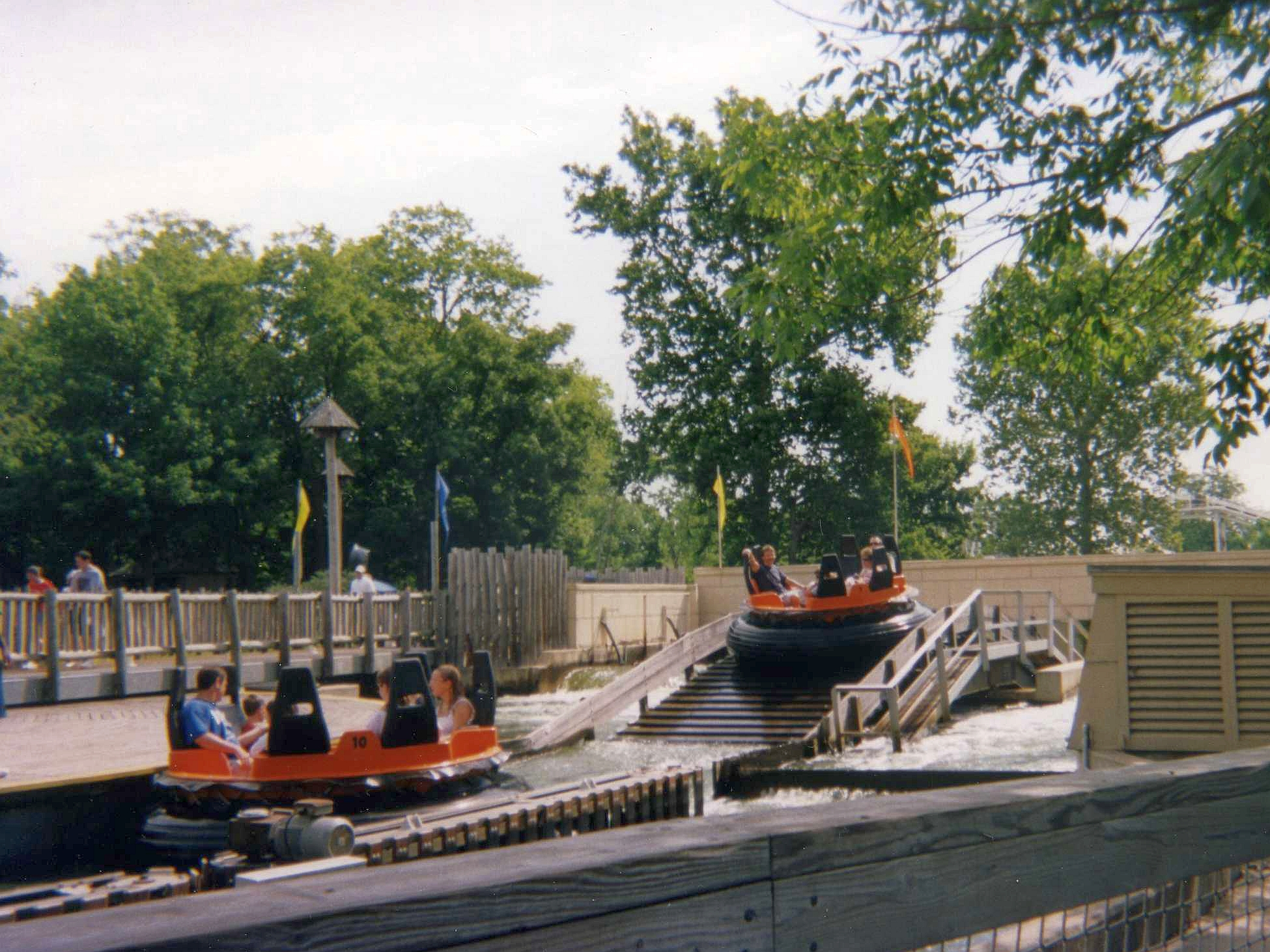

Worlds of Fun
- Area: Africa
- Status: Operating
- Cost: $4 million
- Opening date: May 26, 1984; 41 years ago

General statistics
- Type: River rapids ride
- Manufacturer: Intamin
- Length: 1,800 ft (550 m)
- Height restriction: 46 in (117 cm)
- Fast Lane available

Fury of the Nile is a river rapids ride located at Worlds of Fun amusement park in Kansas City, Missouri. Manufactured by Intamin AG, it opened on May 26, 1984, and was one of the longest rapids rides globally at the time of its construction and the first in the United States to feature a turntable loading system.

== History ==
Fury of the Nile was manufactured by Intamin, marking their tenth rapids ride installation globally. It opened on May 26, 1984, following earlier Intamin rapids rides such as Thunder River at Six Flags AstroWorld (1980) and installations at Six Flags Over Mid-America and Six Flags Over Texas (both 1983). At its opening, Fury of the Nile was notable for being the largest and longest rapids ride to date, spanning 1,800 feet (550 m). It was also the first rapids ride in the United States to incorporate a turntable loading system, a feature first introduced at Efteling in the Netherlands with their Piraña ride (1983) and now common in modern rapids attractions, including those at Walt Disney World and Universal Studios Florida Resort.

The ride's construction involved covering 5 acres (2.0 ha) of undeveloped land, moving over 50,000 cubic yards (38,000 m^{3}) of dirt, pouring over 3,000 cubic yards (2,300 m^{3}) of concrete, and incorporating tons of sand and hundreds of limestone boulders. The advertised cost was $3.5 million, which increased to $4 million by its opening.

On June 19, 1984, shortly after its opening, an accident occurred where two rafts collided, causing one to tip over and resulting in two minor injuries, including a broken leg. Minor modifications were made to the ride following this incident, and it has operated largely without further major incidents since.

The attraction has a history of incorporating prominently colored water, beginning with a blue dye. In 1998, the ride underwent a temporary thematic revision for the Boo! Blast festival (subsequently renamed Halloweekends). Under this seasonal overlay, the water was tinted red and one of the ride vehicles received skeleton props. The modified experience was promoted as "Fury of the Bloody Nile" and reprised each fall season through at least 2003. In 2026, the ride received updates to enhance the rapids.

The Fury of the Nile has periodically been used by the local humane societies and fire departments as a controlled training facility. Its adjustable currents and rapid-flow sections simulate flood and swift water rescue scenarios, enabling animal-rescue specialists and firefighters to practice handling, victim recovery, rope-access techniques, and decision-making in a repeatable, low-risk environment.

== Ride experience ==
Fury of the Nile is a whitewater rafting attraction accommodating up to six riders per raft secured by a shared seat belt. Riders board the rafts on a turntable loading system. The course extends 1,800 feet through a landscaped, wooded environment and incorporates Egyptian-inspired theming—such as sculptural motifs, color schemes, and architectural references. The course contains engineered rapids, geysers, waterfalls, and a dark tunnel segment. Raft vessels go through turbulent areas at high speed, frequently bouncing against riverbanks and occasionally rotating erratically.

Fury of the Nile originally included eight functioning geyser effects. Over time, however, several of these water jets have been decommissioned, leading some observers to describe the ride experience as being less intense.

== Design ==
The ride's water flow is powered by three 250-horsepower pumps, with a fourth pump serving as a backup. These pumps push water from the base of the ride to the loading station, allowing it to flow downhill throughout the ride, propelling the rafts.

Fury of the Nile uses a unique water storage system that was designed by local engineering firm Burns & McDonnell. Unlike most rapids rides that utilize a separate pond or lake for water storage when not in operation, the ride is designed to store its 1,000,000 US gallons (3,800,000 L; 830,000 imp gal) gallons of water within the ride trough itself, including using a 25-foot-deep (7.6 m) trench located at the end of the ride, beneath the lift hill. This design eliminates the need for an external water body nearby. While the deepest section is 25 feet (7.6 m), the average trough depth ranges from 2 to 3 feet (0.61 to 0.91 m). The ride can be completely emptied if necessary and refilled from either the Buccaneer Bay in nearby Oceans of Fun or the city water supply.
