= Runaway Mine Train (Alton Towers) =

Powered roller coaster at Alton Towers

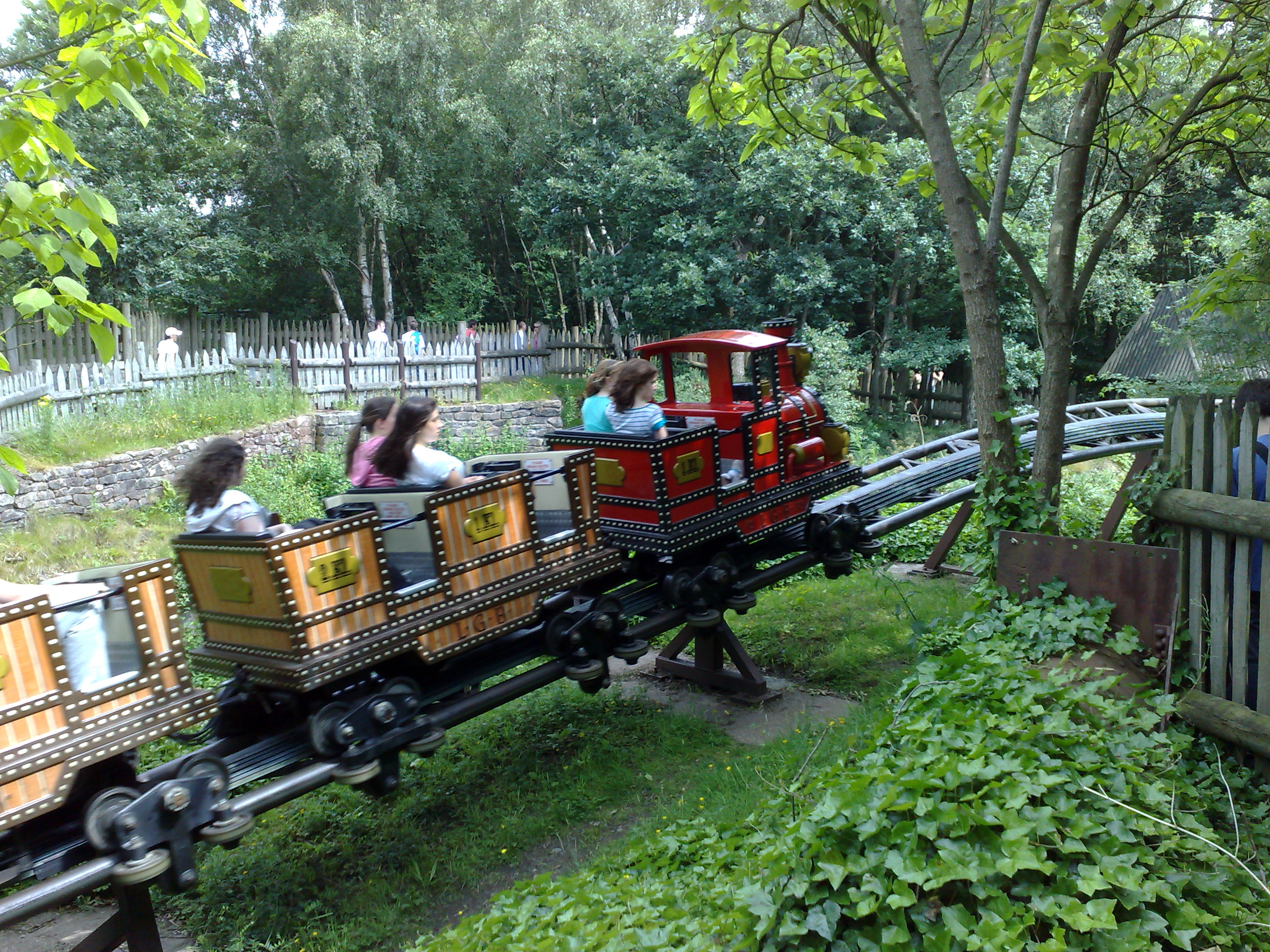

Alton Towers
- Location: Alton Towers
- Park section: Katanga Canyon
- Coordinates: 52.989668°N 1.885612°W
- Status: Operating
- Opening date: 21 March 1992
- Cost: £1,000,000

General statistics
- Type: Steel – Powered – Mine Train
- Manufacturer: Mack Rides
- Model: Powered Coaster
- Track layout: Steel
- Lift/launch system: Onboard motors
- Height: 36 ft (11 m)
- Drop: 36 ft (11 m)
- Length: 1,000 ft (300 m)
- Speed: 22.4 mph (36.0 km/h)
- Inversions: 0
- Duration: 1:50 (2 laps)
- Max vertical angle: 29°
- Capacity: 1062 riders per hour
- G-force: 2.4
- Restraint style: Lap bar
- Height restriction: 110 cm (3 ft 7 in)
- Trains: Single train with 12 cars. Riders arranged 2 across in 2 rows with the exception of the first car which has a single row for a total of 46 riders.
- Fastrack available
- Runaway Mine Train at RCDB

The Runaway Mine Train is a powered mine train roller coaster located in the Katanga Canyon area of Alton Towers in Staffordshire, England. The steel coaster was manufactured by MACK Rides of Germany and opened on March 21, 1992.

The train normally completes two circuits for each ride, although it occasionally completes three circuits on off-peak days.

The ride runs alongside the Congo River Rapids and shares a tunnel section. Passengers must be at least 1.1 m tall to ride, and passengers between 1.1m and 1.3m tall must be accompanied by an adult.

It is currently the park's oldest roller coaster, after The Beastie was removed prior to the 2013 season. The ride layout was drafted by Tussauds park developer John Wardley.

== Incident ==
On 20 July 2006, the failure of a coupling on the train caused it to split into two sections, which then collided in the tunnel. 20 people were injured, six of whom were hospitalised.
