= Grizzly River Run =

Attraction at Disney California Adventure

Coordinates: 33°48′26″N 117°55′15″W

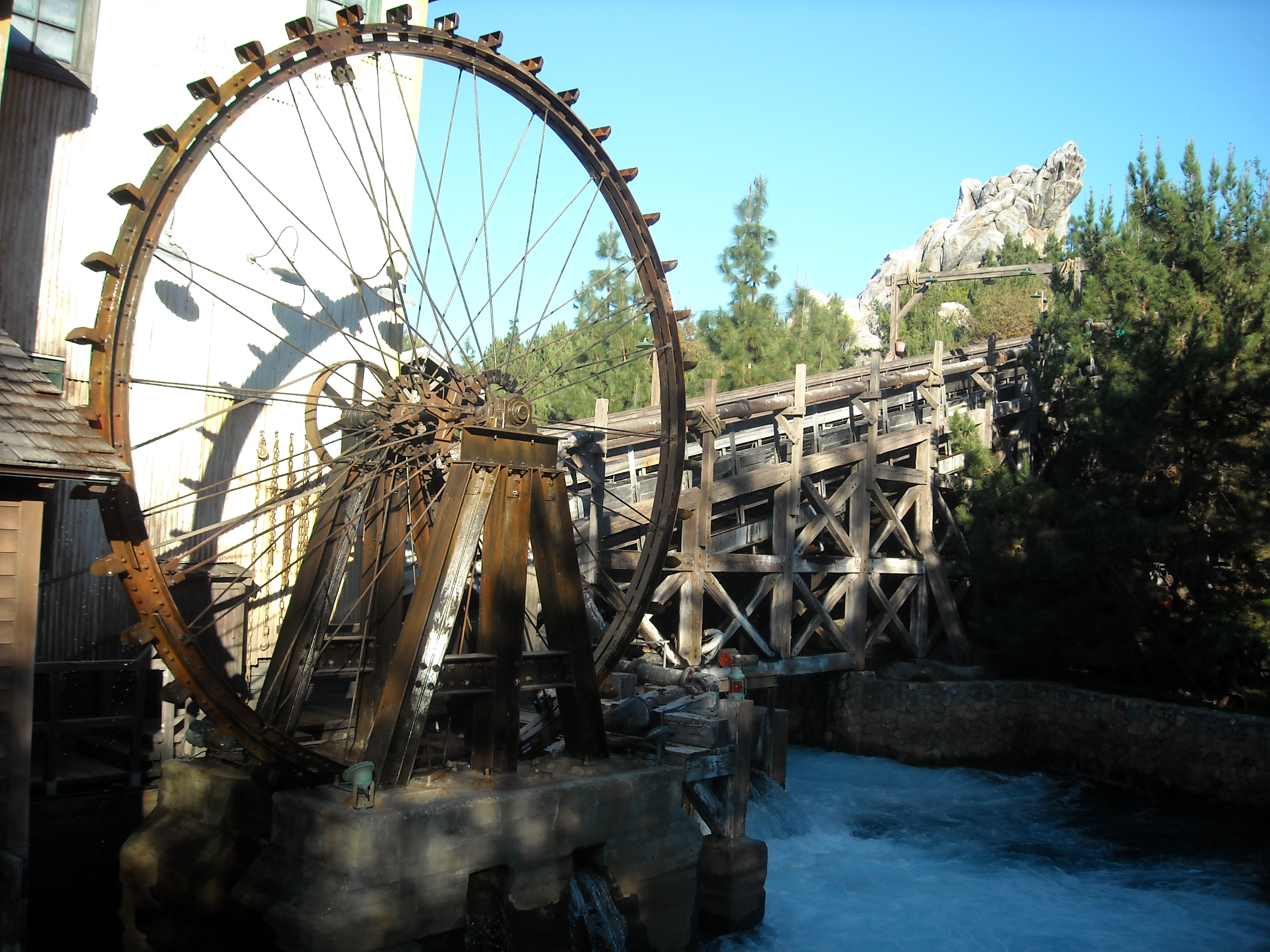

Disney California Adventure
- Area: Grizzly Peak
- Status: Operating
- Opening date: February 8, 2001

General statistics
- Type: River rapids ride
- Manufacturer: Intamin
- Designer: Walt Disney Imagineering
- Height: 45 ft (14 m)
- Drop: 21 ft (6.4 m)
- Duration: 7:20
- Boats: 32 boats. Riders are arranged 8 across in a single row for a total of 8 riders per boat.
- Height restriction: 42 in (107 cm)
- Control System: Dual Allen-Bradley PLC
- Theme: California State Parks
- Lightning Lane Available
- Single rider line available
- Must transfer from wheelchair

Grizzly River Run is a river rapids ride located at Disney California Adventure at the Disneyland Resort in Anaheim, California. It is similar to Kali River Rapids in Disney's Animal Kingdom but distinctive as the rafts are engineered to spin as they descend chutes. The attraction's name comes from Grizzly Peak, the bear-shaped mountain that the rapids flow around. It was designed by Walt Disney Imagineering.

In 2015, the "Condor Flats" area in Disney California Adventure was merged with Grizzly Peak to become the Grizzly Peak Airfield.

== History ==
On October 14, 1998, Disney announced that they would be constructing a brand new theme park next to Disneyland called Disney California Adventure. It would be themed after the history and culture of California and would feature various attractions, such as California Screamin', Soarin' and Maliboomer. The park would also feature a river rapids ride named Grizzly River Run. This new ride would wrap around Grizzly Peak, a snarling bear-shaped mountain that served as the central icon for Disney California Adventure. Construction of the ride began in early 1999 when the mountain began rising.

Grizzly River Run was completed on time for Disney California Adventure's grand opening on February 8, 2001.

In November 2018, warming huts were added outside the attraction. These were removed shortly after, with it being discovered that the Humphrey the Bear decals decorating them were copied from fanart of the character.

== Ride experience ==
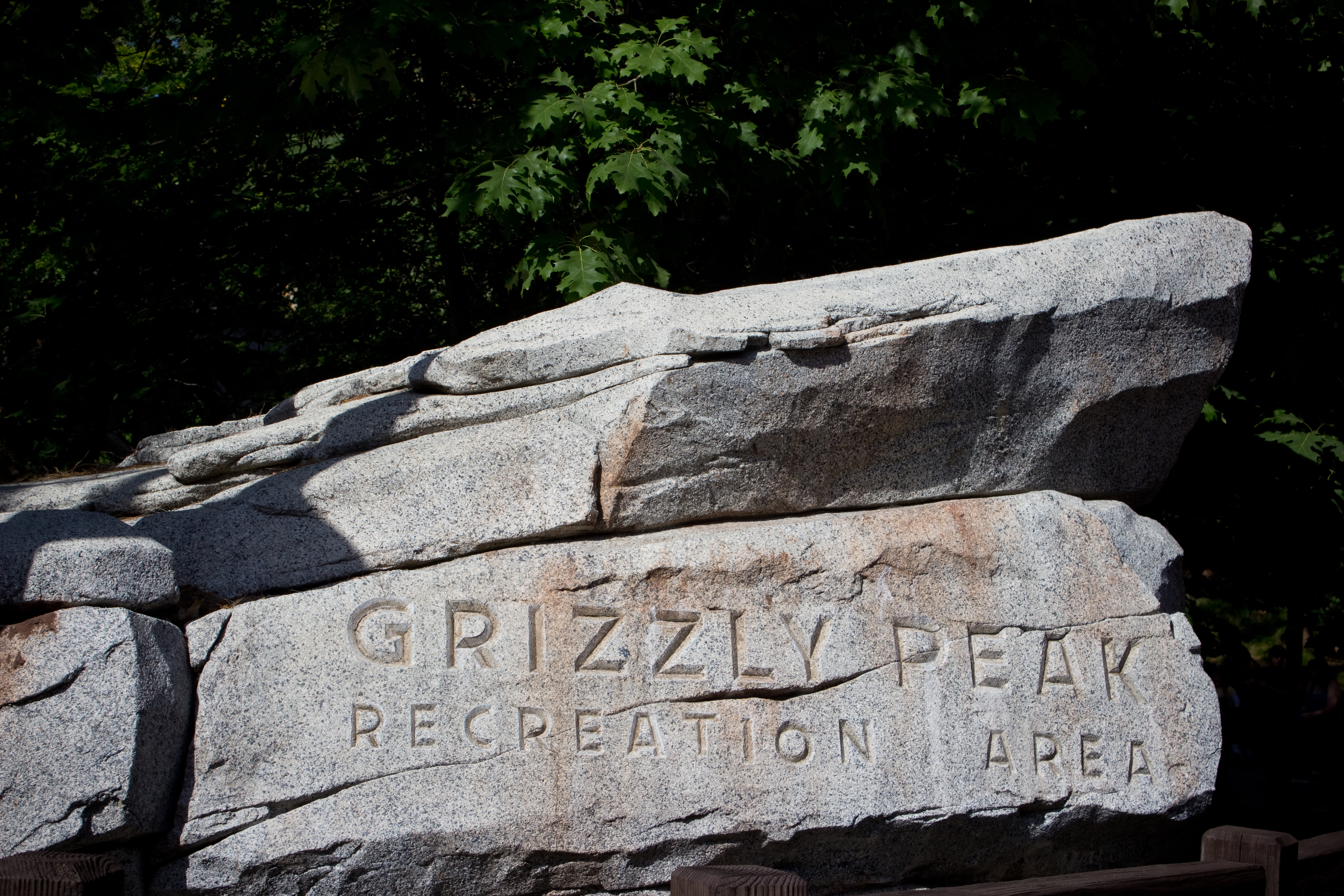
Grizzly Peak is designed as an early 20th-century California state park.

=== Queue ===
The queue takes place in the fictional Grizzly River Rafting Company. The extended queue winds past an office that features a radio, a map of the river, a canoe, and a list of the various rapids on the river. Guests pass various water buckets as they head to the loading station.

As part of the park's major 2007–2012 refurbishment, the old queue that had been themed around extreme sports was replaced with an homage to California state parks, specifically after Redwood Creek and the Sacramento River. Elements that evoke the "golden age" of national parks are placed around the entrance, alluding to the wave of turn-of-the-century wildlife conservation.

=== Main ride ===
The raft trip around Grizzly Peak begins with the raft being lifted up a wooden conveyor that runs under leaking pipes that spray water on the riders. Upon reaching the top of the conveyor, the rafts are dropped into the water to be descended down the peak, passing through a cave and bumping against a log jam. The climax of the ride drops the rafts down into a geyser field. The final drop has a unique element in that the rafts are spun as they begin their descent.

As with all flume-type rides, there must be a location to store or drain the water in the upper sections of the flumes when the pumps are shut down. The original plan was to create a large, underground basin beneath Grizzly Peak to hold water. This would have required costly excavation and construction. Upon looking at the final layout of California Adventure, it was noticed that the Pacific Wharf (now San Fransokyo Square) area of the park had a water element meant to simulate a tidal basin. The tidal basin is located across a walkway from Grizzly River Run and became the catch basin for water from the raft ride. The rise and fall of water in the tidal basin serves the dual purpose of providing a location to store water and being a scenic element that simulates a rising and falling tide.

== See also ==
- Kali River Rapids at Disney's Animal Kingdom
- Roaring Rapids at Shanghai Disneyland
