= Roaring Rapids (Disney) =

River rapids ride in Shanghai Disneyland

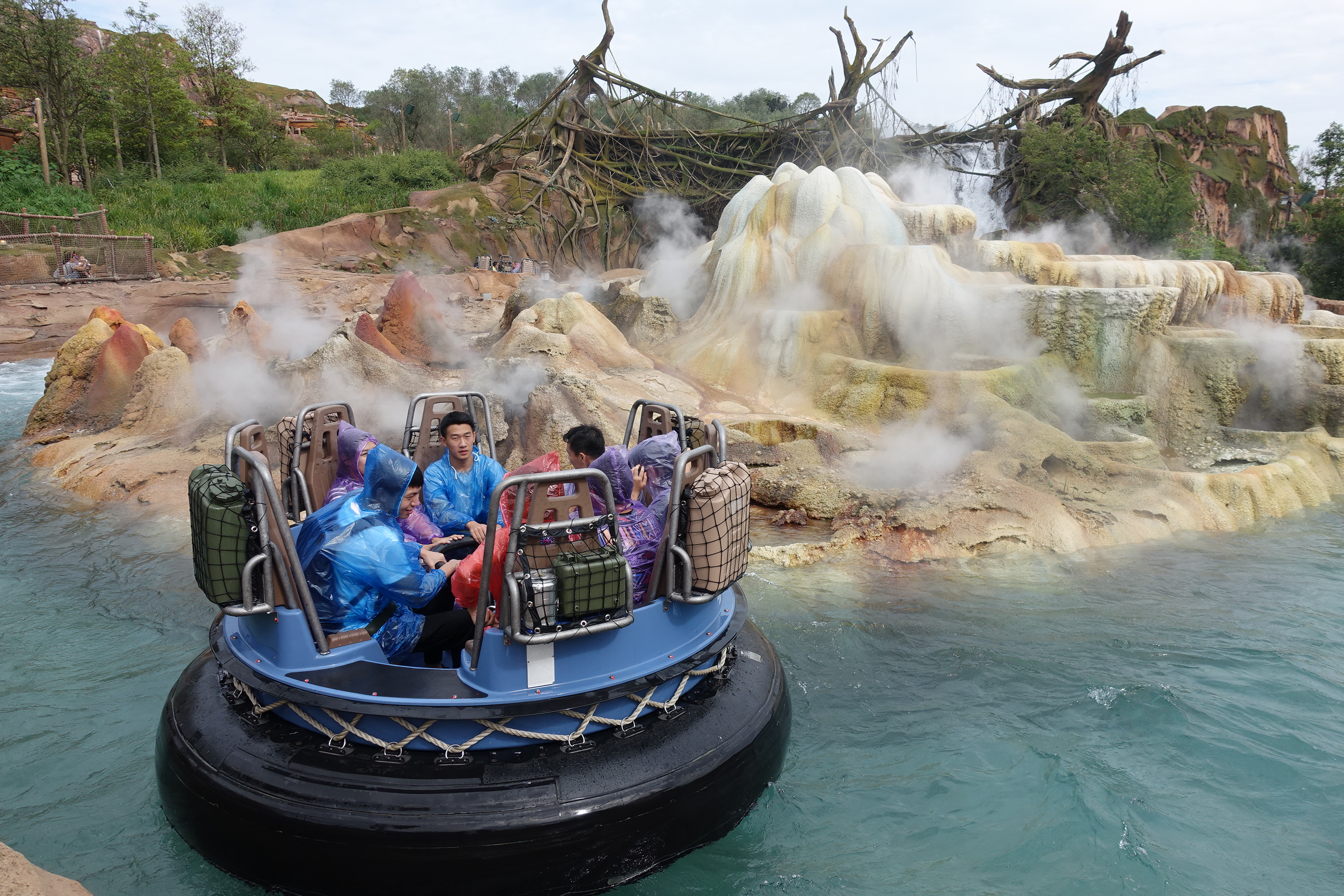
- Roaring Rapids at Shanghai Disneyland

Shanghai Disneyland Park
- Area: Adventure Isle
- Status: Operating
- Soft opening date: June 8, 2016
- Opening date: June 16, 2016

Ride statistics
- Attraction type: River rapids ride
- Manufacturer: Sansei Technologies
- Designer: Walt Disney Imagineering
- Height restriction: 107 cm (3 ft 6 in)
- Disney Premier Access available
- Single rider line available
- Must transfer from wheelchair

Roaring Rapids (Chinese: 雷鸣山漂流; pinyin: Léimíng shān piāoliú; lit. 'Thunder Mountain Rafting') is a river rapids ride that is currently operating at Shanghai Disneyland. The ride opened along with the rest of the park on June 16, 2016.

== Ride experience ==
Roaring Rapids travels through the rivers flowing from the Roaring Mountain or Apu Taku in the native tongue of the local Arbori tribe. According to legend, the endless flow of waters from the mountain is the domain of the Guardian of the Water, a giant crocodilian beast named Q’aráq (Chinese: 魁), a beast that the League of Adventurers is interested in learning more about.

Guests begin by boarding rafts and set off upriver to Field Camp Beta. However, a fallen tree blocks the way and diverts the current in another direction, into the mountain. The ride has guests pass by a massive Audio-Animatronic of Q’aráq, who snaps at the guests as they travel through his subterranean lair. After escaping Q’aráq, the rafts enter a whirlpool, then past simulated volcanic vents and steaming geysers as the rapids sweep guests to the end of the ride.

== See also ==
- Kali River Rapids at Disney's Animal Kingdom
- Grizzly River Run at Disney California Adventure
