= Shipwreck Rapids =

Theme park ride at SeaWorld San Diego

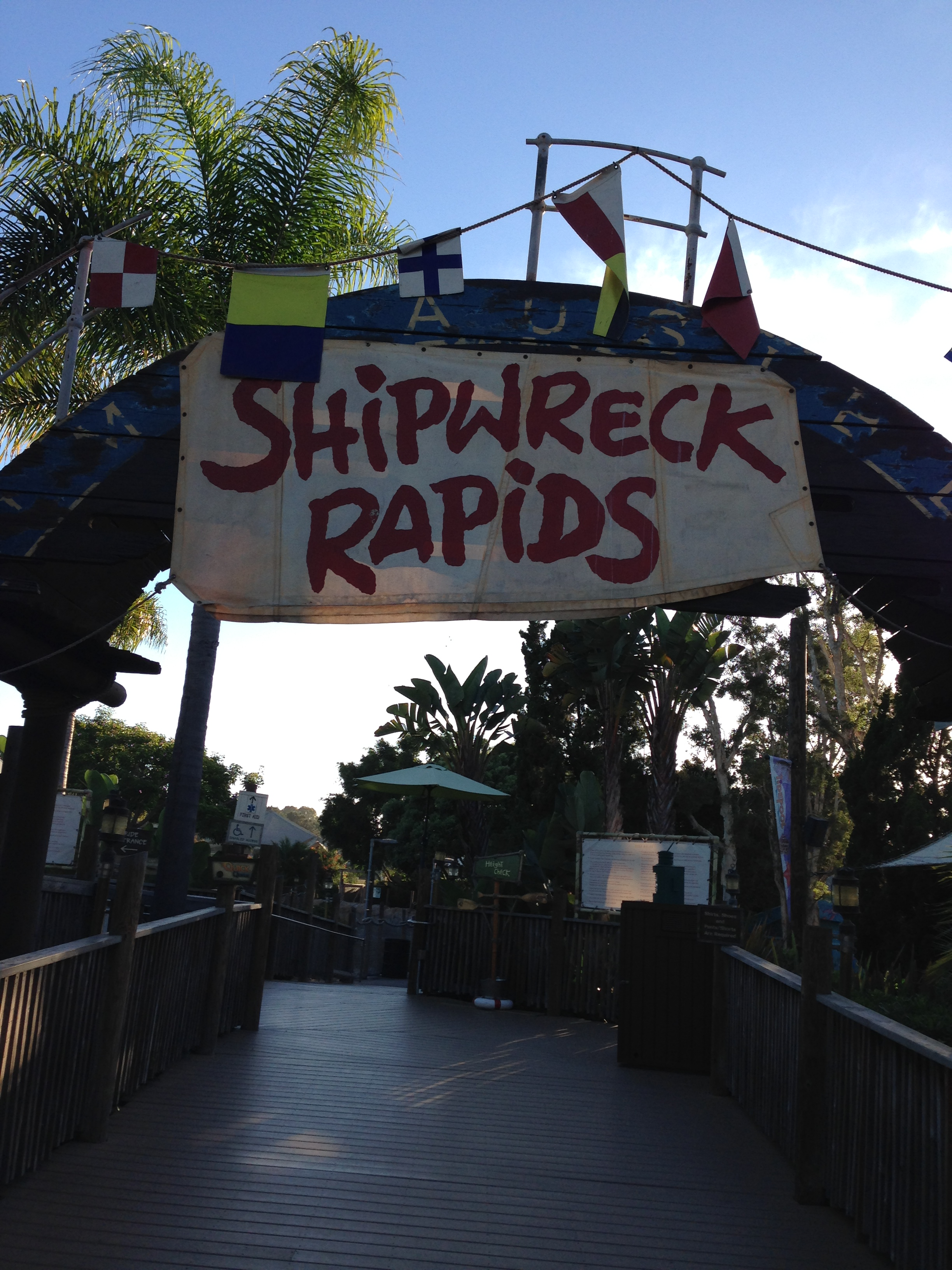
- Ride entrance

SeaWorld San Diego
- Status: Operating
- Opening date: May 29, 1999

Ride statistics
- Attraction type: River rapids ride
- Designer: SeaWorld Parks and Entertainment
- Vehicle type: Raft
- Riders per vehicle: 9
- Rows: 1
- Riders per row: 9
- Height restriction: 42 in (107 cm)
- Quick Queue available
- Single rider line available
- Wheelchair accessible
- Must transfer from wheelchair

Shipwreck Rapids is a river rapids ride currently operating at SeaWorld San Diego in San Diego, California. This attraction is located in the Shipwreck Island area of the park, which is themed as a South Pacific island where many ships and their crews have been marooned. The four stranded ships are the Implausible, RMS Royal Star, Wholly Mackerel, and Dream Boat II.

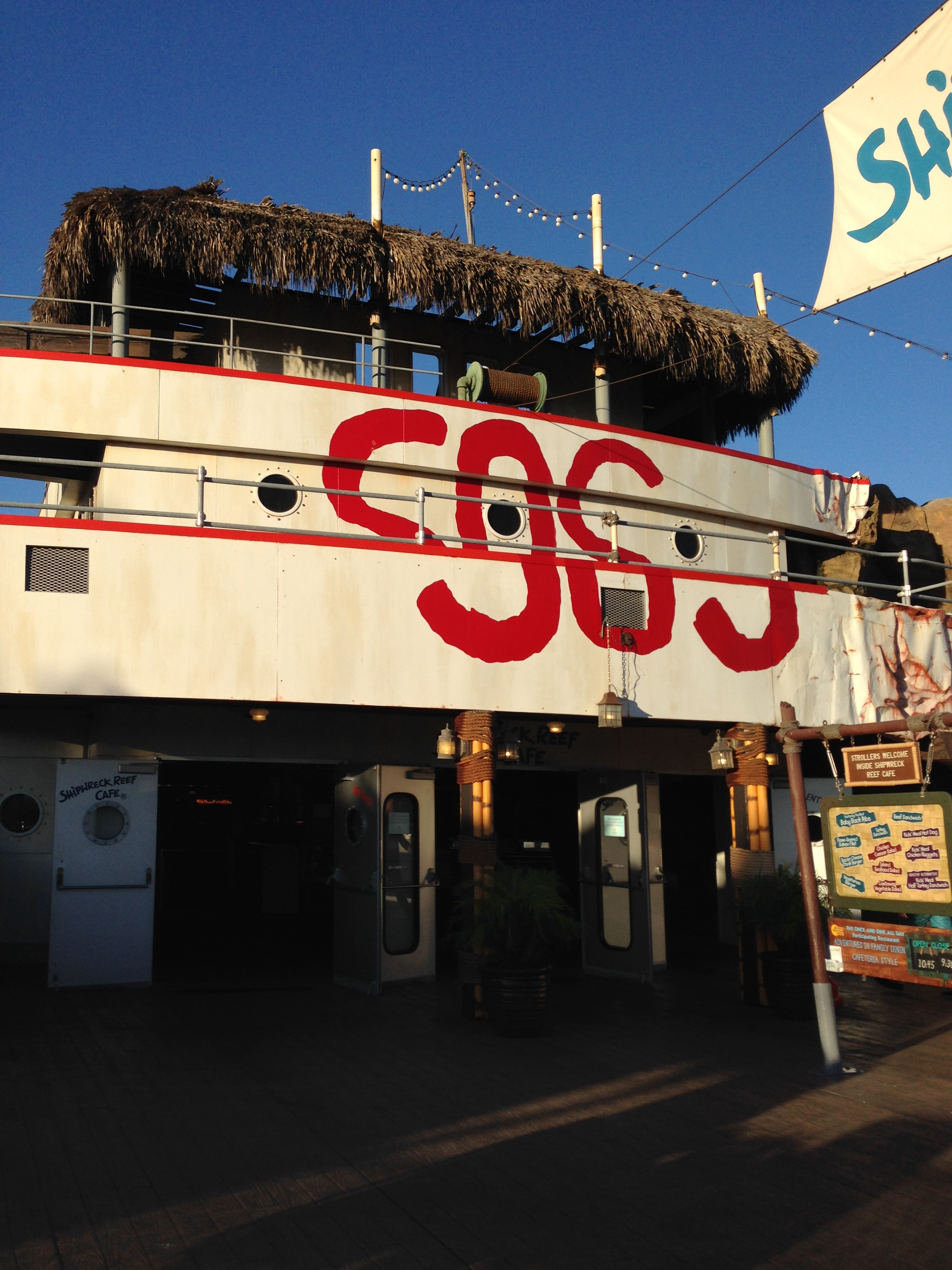
The entrance to the Shipwreck Reef Cafe.

The other main part of the area is a restaurant named the Shipwreck Reef Cafe. Every so often a ship's horn can be heard, followed by a SOS signal in Morse code.

The ride has guests board yellow and white circular rafts, each with a max capacity of 9, via a rotating platform station.

== Attraction summary ==
=== Queue ===
Guests enter under a large "Shipwreck Rapids" sign, and proceed through a winding queue until they climb to an over-water platform with many switchbacks. After two platforms of switchbacks, guests cross over the water. On the bridge, there are three lines. The line on the right is for normal riders, the line in the middle is for Quick Queue and single riders, and the line on the left is the exit. Riders then descend into the rotating platform. Along the way, Caribbean-style music plays and television monitors play safety videos. Most of the queue is closed off, but in the summer most of the line is utilized, as lines can reach 90 minutes.

=== Main ride ===
After telling a ride operator how many people are in your group, you proceed to a blue circle until you are told to enter the ride vehicle. When you sit down, you buckle yourself in with a seat belt that crosses everyone in your seat. On the side opposite of the loading area is the storage space for excess rafts and the loading area for disabled people. As you disembark, the raft makes a small left turn down calm waters. The raft picks up speed as you make a u-turn and then reach the first set of rapids. After hitting two rapids, your raft drops slightly and goes under a net with cargo that constantly drips water. The raft than hits another set of rapids before turning left into flat water. As the ride gradually curves back right, water cannons are shot at the raft by non riders. These can be fired for $0.25 a shot. The raft then passes in between a sea turtle exhibit. A piano hanging on the side of a boat sometimes shoots water at riders and plays piano music. The boat with a piano is often open for guests to eat their meals from Shipwreck Reef Cafe on. Riders pass under buckets with holes in the bottom that sometimes pass over the rafts and drip water. Now rafts enter rougher waters and take a small drop between waterfalls and into more rapids. Riders then pass under the Shipwreck Reef Cafe and turn before colliding with another large ship. When on-ride cameras were operating, riders would then have had their photos taken, though the cameras have been disabled. The riders enter the end of the ride, passing under a waterfall and into a cave. In this mostly dark cave, riders hit the final rapid and then hit smooth water. After passing the propeller and glowing boilers of a ship, rafts wait in line to ride back up a chain lift. The chain lift emerges riders from a hole in the bow of a ship and into the station. On either side of the lift are large red screws which carry water up to the station. Once back, riders are instructed to unbuckle their seat belts and exit.

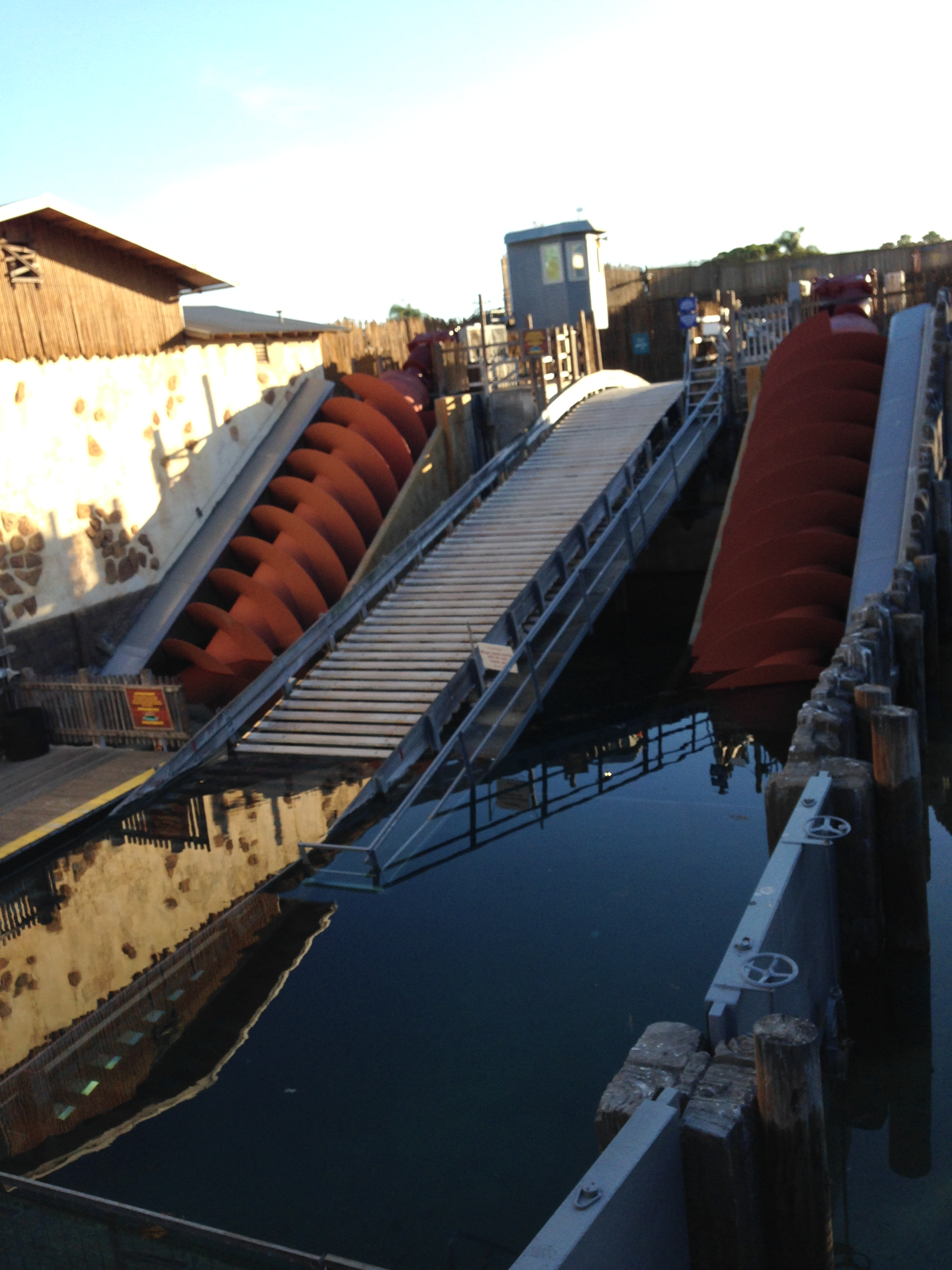
A photo of the final lift hill while the ride was under maintenance. The large red screws on either side of the lift are used to carry water up to the station.

=== Exit ===
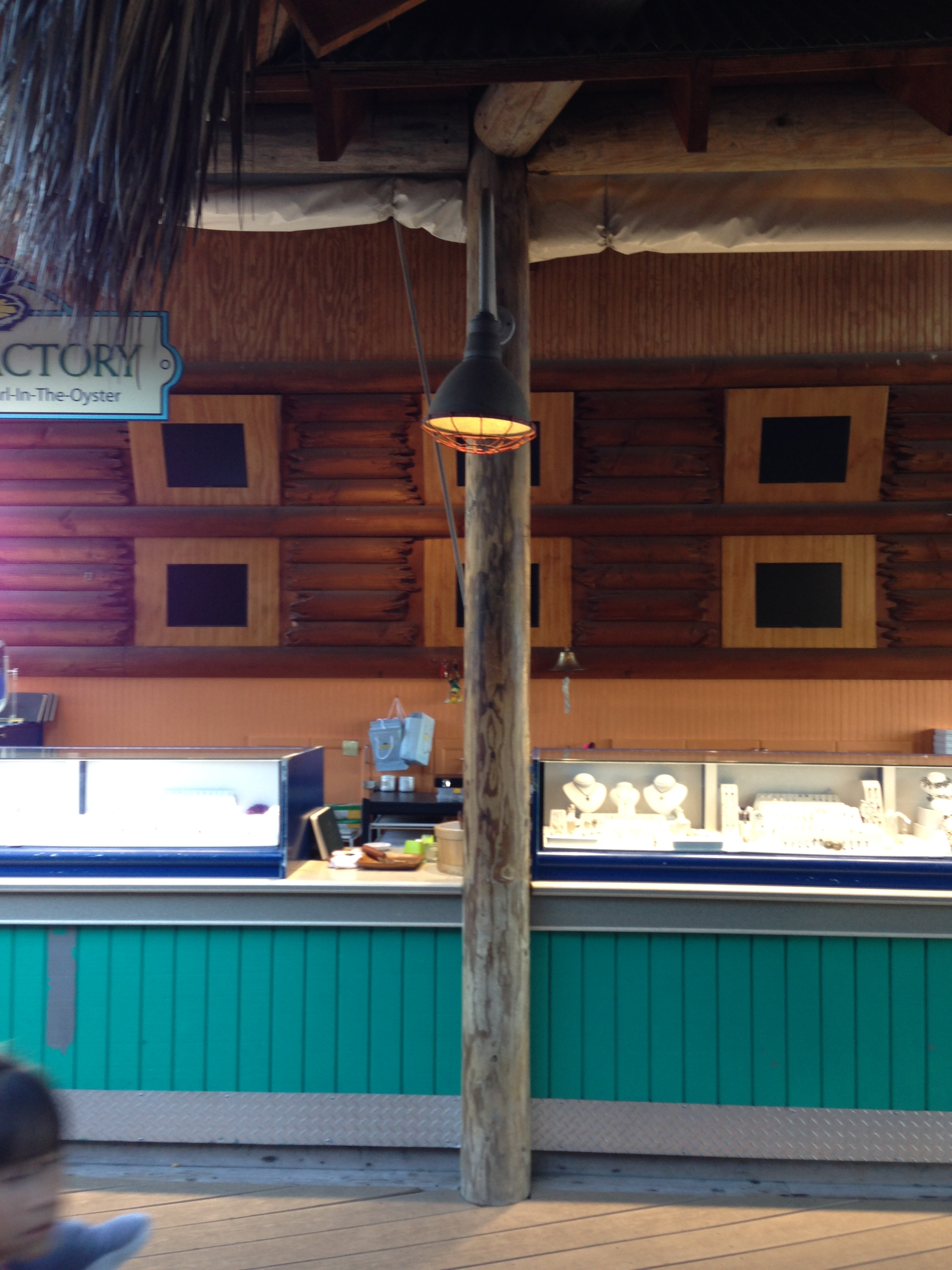
The former on-ride photo kiosk, now a pearl art shop. The old monitors are still visible.

Riders walk over the same bridge as in the queue and into a surfing-style shop. The on-ride picture kiosk has since been converted into a pearl art shop. Walk in dryers are available at the exit.

== See also ==
- SeaWorld San Diego
- River rapids ride
