= River rapids ride =

Type of amusement ride

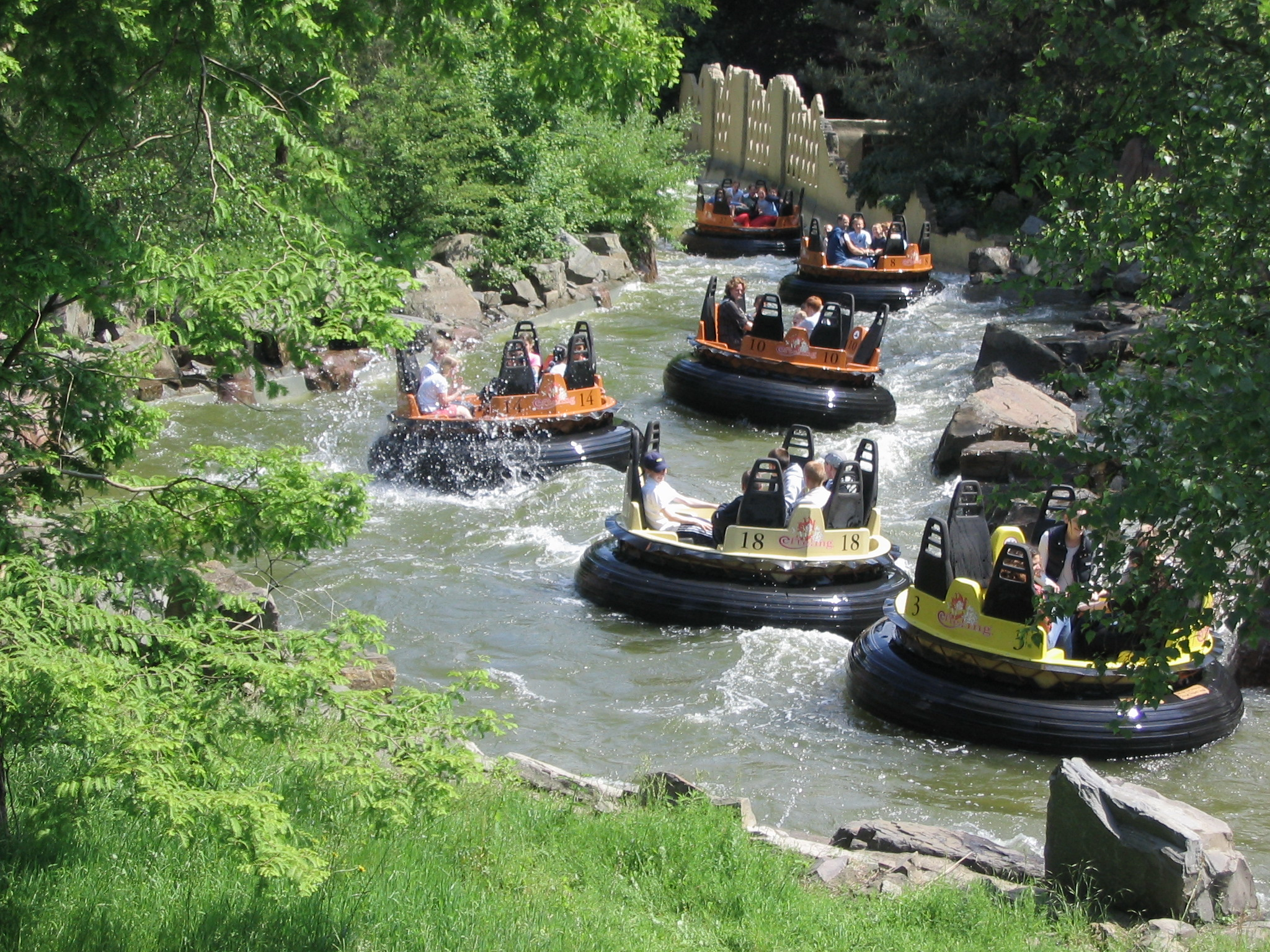
Piraña at Efteling in the Netherlands

A river rapids ride (or river rafting ride) is an amusement ride that simulates whitewater rafting.

== History ==
The river rapids ride concept was proposed by Bill Crandall (general manager of AstroWorld in Houston) and developed by Intamin. AstroWorld introduced the world's first river rapids ride, Thunder River, in 1980 and popularized a concept which can now be found at most major amusement parks. Despite being an incredibly popular attraction, AstroWorld's Thunder River (being a prototype) was initially plagued by issues that were corrected in the first few seasons of operation. The boat bumpers were re-designed, portions of the wide river channel were narrowed or barricaded to prevent boats from bottle-necking or getting caught in a backflow, and a planned whirlpool effect was scrapped.

== Construction ==
Many modern river rapids rides feature a much narrower river channel as well as smaller boats (6 seats as opposed to 12 seats). Some are heavily themed, while others may present a natural setting for added realism. Multiple manufacturers have introduced new elements to the rapids ride concept: a vertical lift system, shoot the chute-style drops, and a whirlpool feature.

River rapids rides feature circular rafts with two main components: the fiberglass body in which passengers are seated and the rubber ring upon which the body is secured. The rubber ring provides buoyancy as well as shock absorption for when rafts collide with an obstacle during the course of the ride or with each other. Most rafts hold between six and twelve passengers, seated in groups of two or three depending on the manufacturer of the ride. Riders face toward center of the boat and are usually secured by a lap belt. Some rafts feature a circular metal bar in the middle of the raft; this gives passengers a place to grip or brace their feet. Some parks include a space for stowing small items in the center. The floor of the raft body is generally above water level to allow drainage. Most parks require riders to be 36 inches or taller.

Congo River Rapids in the Katanga Canyon area of Alton Towers.

Generally, the station starts at the highest point on the ride, with the river channel having a slight gradient to it for the remainder of the ride. A lift hill then brings the boats back up to station level at the end of the ride. This is usually also the point where the ride's main pumps are housed, bringing the water up from the low point and back up to the high point. The gradient on the river channel provides the water with its flow and pace. This also has the interesting side effect such that when the ride's pumps are switched off at the end of operation or in an emergency, the water naturally flows back to the end of the ride where it collects, leaving the majority of the ride's river channel empty and drained until the pumps are turned back on. All Intamin permanent (and most other) river rapids rides feature a connected lake of some sort at the end of the ride before the lift hill. This is sometimes used to store temporarily decommissioned boats. Its main purpose, however, is to help store the large amounts of water that collect at the end of the ride (before the lift hill) once the ride's main pumps are turned off. This is the water that would have been circulating around the ride when it is in operation. When observed, you can usually see the height difference in the water level in this lake from when the rides pumps are turned on, to when they are turned off. This effect is usually less noticeable if an already existing larger lake is used for the ride's water storage. Generally, a longer rapids ride will need a larger lake, as there will be more water to store once the ride's pumps have been turned off. Depending on the size and length of the river rapids ride, it can take up to 15 minutes to fill the ride's channel up from empty once the pumps have been switched on.

The flowing water makes its way over wooden logs or plastic tubes strapped to the base of the river channel, which disrupt the smooth flow of the water, thus providing the ride with its 'rapids'. Most river rapid rides also feature a wave section, where the river channel widens and a wave machine creates waves at a 90-degree angle to the flow of the water and the boats. Rocks are also sometimes bolted to the base of the river channel on metal frames, which helps create a more natural rapids feel.

There are generally two types of river rapids ride stations: those with conveyor belts and those with turntables. Those with conveyor belts are able to lift the raft completely out of the stream of water (usually as an extension of the lift hill at the end of the ride) and advance it to various points in the station to allow passengers to enter and exit via raised straight platforms on either side of the conveyors. Stations that utilize a turntable allow the raft to stay in the stream of water as the turntable continuously revolves, with the rafts wedged between the turntable and a curved surface so that the rafts move at the same speed as the turntable (and not at the same speed as the water). When they reach a certain point around the turntable, the rafts become un-wedged and are released in relatively even intervals to traverse the course.

Historically, axial flow submersible pumps have been the pump of choice for most rides of this type. The small lateral footprint and large vertical water pumping capacity make them perfect for this type of application, being large in vertical size, they fit right into the end of the ride where there is usually a sudden and large change in height from the end of the ride to the station. Some rides, due to their design, have multiple pump units at different locations along the ride. One example is the new Infinity Falls at SeaWorld Orlando. Occasionally, screw pumps have been used too. In the case of axial flow submersible pumps, rides are usually fitted with four; three being used at all times for the safe operation of the ride and a fourth on standby. The pumps are usually rotated in use to even out wear and tear.

== Ride layout ==
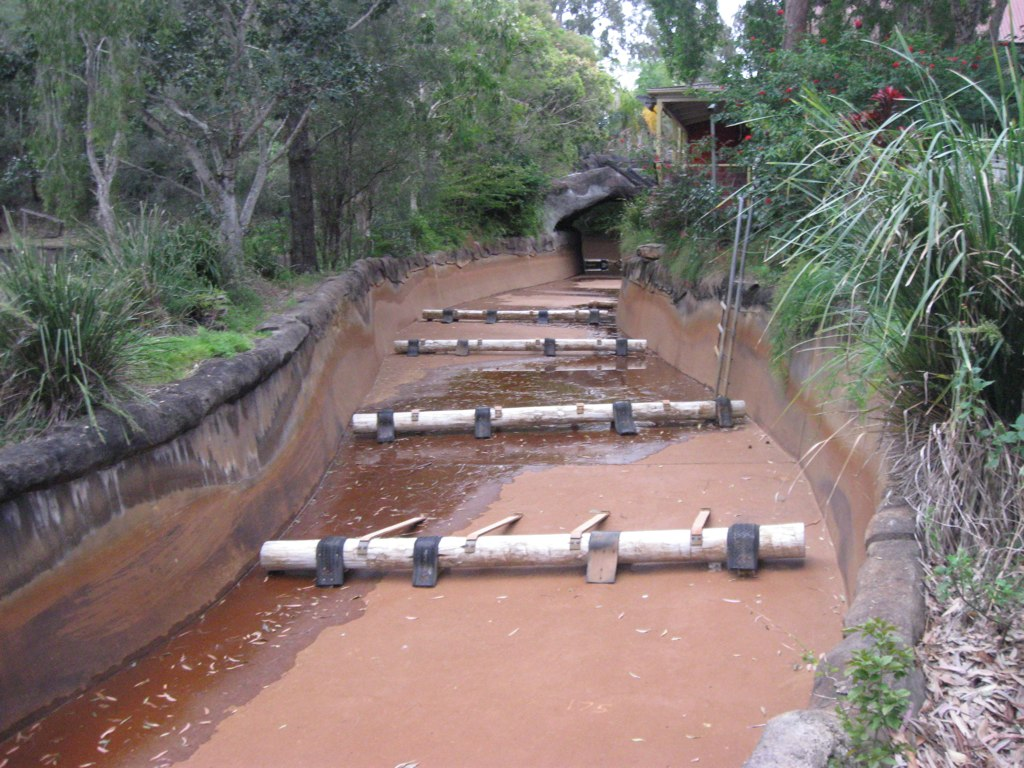
Thunder River Rapids Ride drained for maintenance showing the system that generates the rapids effect

After leaving the station, the raft will enter relatively calm waters. After travelling a safe distance (usually 5–15 metres), the raft will enter more turbulent waters. Usually rapids are made by the amusement park having large cylinder tubes underneath the water. The bigger the tube, the bigger the rapids. Along with the rapids, there are often waterfalls.

Finally, there may be pressurized water jets. An automated system may spray streams of water through a nozzle directed toward a passing raft, or on other rides, large amounts of water may shoot from a jet or cannon, often pointed upward so that the falling water will douse riders. Some parks (for instance, Busch Gardens Tampa Bay), have coin-operated water jets and cannons so that passersby can pay to attempt to soak riders.

== Safety incidents ==
On 19 June 1984, an accident occurred on Fury of the Nile at Worlds of Fun in Kansas City, Missouri, where two rafts collided, causing one to tip over and resulting in two minor injuries, including a broken leg. Minor modifications were made to the ride following this incident, and it has operated largely without further major incidents since.

On 25 October 2016, a malfunction of the Thunder River Rapids Ride at Dreamworld on the Gold Coast, Queensland, Australia, resulted in the deaths of four people. Two were ejected from the ride and two were trapped in the conveyor belt under it. River rapids rides have also had accidents at a number of other theme parks.

On 9 May 2017, an 11-year-old girl, Evha Jannath fell into the water on the Splash Canyon Ride at Drayton Manor Theme Park in Staffordshire, England at around 2:20pm. She was airlifted to Birmingham Children's Hospital but died later in the hospital due to the extent of her injuries. The park was closed from 10 to 12 May to allow the Health and Safety Executive (HSE) to complete their work. The park said this was a mark of respect for her family.

On July 3, 2021, a raft on Raging River at Adventureland in Altoona, Iowa, carrying six passengers overturned, sending four guests to a local hospital with severe injuries. One of the passengers, an 11-year-old boy, later died. The ride was inspected the day before the incident and was found to be in normal working order.

== Notable manufacturers ==
- Barr Engineering
- Bear Rides
- Fabbri Group
- Hafema
- Hopkins Rides
- Interlink
- Intamin
- L&T Systems
- Preston & Barbieri
- Reverchon Industries
- Ride Engineers Switzerland
- SBF Visa Group
- Soquet
- Van Egdom
- Vekoma
- WhiteWater West
- Zamperla

== Installations ==
Name	Park	Location	Manufacturer	Opened	Status
ACME Rápidos	Parque Warner Madrid	Spain	Intamin	2002	Operating
Adventure Cove River Rapids	Drayton Manor	United Kingdom	Intamin	2021; 1993-2017	Operating
Airship Surfing	Guilin Merryland Theme Park	China	Hopkins Rides	1997	Operating
Alpin-Rafting	Ravensburger Spieleland	Germany	Intamin	2006	Operating
Amazone Express	Everland	South Korea	Unknown	Unknown	Operating
Apache Falls	Gulliver's Warrington	United Kingdom	Unknown	2016	Operating
Aqua Ride	Sea Paradise	Japan	Intamin	1992	Operating
Arung Jeram	Dunia Fantasi	Indonesia	Hopkins Rides	1993	Operating
Atlantis	Energylandia	Poland	SBF Visa Group	2014	Operating
Beaver Rafting	BonBon-Land	Denmark	Intamin	1998	Operating
Bello Bay Cruise	Universal Kids Resort	United States	Hafema	2026	Operating
Bengal Rapid River	Bellewaerde	Belgium	Vekoma	1988	Operating
Blizzard River	Six Flags New England	United States	Hopkins Rides	1999	Operating
Bobby Drop	Bobbejaanland	Belgium	Van Egdom	1999	Removed
Calico River Rapids; Formerly Bigfoot Rapids	Knott's Berry Farm	United States	Intamin	1987	Operating
Canyon Raft Ride	Jin Jiang Action Park	China	Bear Rides	Unknown	Operating
Canyon Rafting	Chongqing Wanda Theme Park	China	Intamin	2020	Operating
Canyon River Rapids	Hersheypark	United States	Intamin	1987	Removed
Çılgın Nehir	Vialand	Turkey	Intamin	2013	Operating
Cloudy with a Chance of Meatballs: River Expedition	Motiongate Dubai	United Arab Emirates	WhiteWater West	2017	Operating
Colorad’Eau	Parc du Bocasse	France	Reverchon Industries	2003	Operating
Congo Rapids	Six Flags Great Adventure	United States	Intamin	1981	Operating
Congo River Rapids	Busch Gardens Tampa	United States	Intamin	1982	Operating
Congo River Rapids	Alton Towers	United Kingdom	Intamin	1986	Operating
Crazy River	Dennlys Parc	France	Soquet	2008	Operating
Crocodile Gorge	Ratanga Junction	South Africa	Intamin	1998	Removed
Crocodile Rapids	Etnaland	Italy	Hafema	2005	Operating
Diablo Falls	Six Flags AstroWorld	United States	WhiteWater West	2003	Removed
Dino Raft	Walygator Parc	France	Soquet	1989	Operating
Disaster Canyon	Elitch Gardens	United States	Hopkins Rides	1995	Operating
Djengu River	Toverland	Netherlands	Hafema	2013	Operating
Dòng sông thử thách	Dragon Park	Vietnam	Intamin	2017	Operating
Donner Fluss	Holiday Park	Germany	Intamin	1984	Operating
Dr. Geyser's Remarkable Raft Ride	Story Land	United States	Hopkins Rides	1989	Operating
Dragon River	Mitsui Greenland	Japan	Interlink	1997	Operating
El Rio	Bobbejaanland	Belgium	Hafema	2000	Operating
El Rio Grande	Walibi Holland	Netherlands	Vekoma	1994	Operating
Excalibur - Secrets of the Dark Forest; Formerly Mystery River; Die Unendliche Geschichte - Auf der Suche nach Phantasien	Movie Park Germany	Germany	Intamin	1996	Operating
Fårup Rafting	Fårup Sommerland	Denmark	Bear Rides	1998	Operating
Fjord Rafting	Europa-Park	Germany	Intamin	1991	Operating
Fluch des Teutates	Freizeitpark Plohn	Germany	ABC Rides	2013	Operating
Fury of the Nile	Worlds of Fun	United States	Intamin	1984	Operating
Grand Canyon	Dream World	Thailand	Hopkins Rides	2002	Operating
Grand Canyon Rapids	MGM Grand Adventures Theme Park	United States	Intamin	1993	Removed
Grand Canyon Rapids	PortAventura Park	Spain	Intamin	1995	Operating
Grand Rapids	Michigan's Adventure	United States	Intamin	2006	Operating
Grizzly River Rampage	Opryland USA	United States	Intamin	1982	Removed
Grizzly River Run	Disney California Adventure	United States	Intamin	2001	Operating
Grizzly Run	Six Flags Darien Lake	United States	Intamin	1989	Removed
Grizzly Run	Geauga Lake	United States	Intamin	1996	Removed
Hidrolift	Parque Aventura d'Or	Spain	Zamperla	2008	Operating
High-Speed-Rafting	Churpfalzpark	Germany	Unknown	2003	Operating
Hunderfossen Rafting	Hunderfossen Familienpark	Norway	Bear Rides	2000	Operating
Hurjakuru	Linnanmäki	Finland	Intamin	1998	Operating
Hydro Surge	Myrtle Beach Pavilion	United States	Hopkins Rides	1993	Removed
Infinity Falls	SeaWorld Orlando	United States	Intamin	2018	Operating
I segreti dell acqua	Felifonte	Italy	Hafema	2003	Operating
Jungle Adventure	Lotte World	South Korea	Intamin	Unknown	Removed
Jungle Adventure	Energylandia	Poland	Intamin	2017	Operating
Jungle Rapids	Gardaland	Italy	Intamin	1999	Operating
Jungle Rapids	Hainan Ocean Paradise	China	Intamin	2021	Under construction
Jurassic Park Rapids Adventure	Universal Studios Singapore	Singapore	Hafema	2010	Operating
Kali River Rapids	Disney's Animal Kingdom	United States	Intamin	1999	Operating
Kållerado	Liseberg	Sweden	Intamin	1997	Operating
Kaskade	Festyland	France	Zamperla	2015	Operating
Koskiseikkailu	Särkänniemi	Finland	Intamin	1999	Operating
Lost River of the Ozarks	Silver Dollar City	United States	Barr Engineering	1985	Removed
La Descente du Colorado	Le Pal	France	Soquet	1988	Operating
Le Raft	Bagatelle	France	Hafema	2001	Operating
Le Rapidé; Also known as Drakkar	Rainbow Magicland	Italy	Intamin	2011	Operating
Los Rápidos	Parque Aventura d'Or	Spain	Zamperla	Unknown	Operating
Los Rápidos	Parque de Atracciones de Madrid	Spain	Hopkins Rides	1996	Operating
Lost World	Erse-Park	Germany	ABC Rides	2004	Operating
L'Oxygénarium	Parc Astérix	France	WhiteWater West	1999	Operating
Madagascar Crazy River Adventure	Beto Carrero World	Brazil	Hafema	2014	Operating
Mangiabiglie	Miragica	Italy	Zamperla	2009	Operating
Mountain Rafting	Heide Park	Germany	Intamin	1992	Operating
Mystic River Falls	Silver Dollar City	United States	Ride Engineers Switzerland	2020	Operating
Nagashimasuka	Fuji-Q Highland	Japan	Hafema	2008	Operating
Niagara	La Récré des 3 Curés	France	Van Egdom	2009	Operating
North Pole 1	Terra Park	Romania	ABC Rides	2012	Operating
Périple d'Hanon	Carthageland	Tunisia	Hafema	2003	Operating
Piraña	Efteling	Netherlands	Intamin	1983	Operating
Pixie River	Rainbow Magicland	Italy	SBF Visa Group	2011	Operating
Planet AQA	Space World	Japan	Hafema	1992	Removed
Popeye & Bluto's Bilge-Rat Barges	Universal's Islands of Adventure	United States	Barr Engineering	1999	Operating
Radja River	Walibi Belgium	Belgium	Intamin	1988	Operating
Radja River	Walibi Rhône-Alpes	France	Soquet	1989	Operating
Radja River	Walibi Sud-Ouest	France	Intamin	1989	Operating
Rafting	Didi'Land	France	Soquet	2009	Operating
Rafting Africano	Badoca Safari Park	Portugal	Hafema	2008	Operating
Rafting-Bahn	Rasti-Land	Germany	Hafema	2002	Operating
Raging Rapids	Kennywood	United States	Intamin	1985	Operating
Raging Rapids in Boulder Canyon	Holiday World	United States	Hopkins Rides	1990	Closed
Raging Rapids River Ride	Kentucky Kingdom	United States	Intamin	1999	Operating
Raging River	Adventureland	United States	Intamin	1983	Removed
Raging River	Great Escape	United States	Intamin	1986	Operating
Raging River Rapids	Gold Reef City	South Africa	Intamin	Unknown	Operating
Ragnarok	Tusenfryd	Norway	Hafema	2016	Operating
Rainforest River Adventure Ride	Rainforest Cafe Galveston	United States	Sally Corporation	2003	Operating
Rampaging Rapids	Hunt's Pier	United States	Intamin	1985	Removed
Rapid River	Fantasilandia	Chile	WhiteWater West	2003	Operating
Rapid River	Zoomarine	Portugal	Preston & Barbieri	2008	Operating
Rapid River	Zoosafari Fasanolandia	Italy	Fabbri Group	2008	Operating
Rapid River Ride	Dream Park	Egypt	Intamin	1998	Operating
Rapide di Leonardo	Leolandia	Italy	Zamperla	2009	Operating
Rapidos de Argos	Terra Mítica	Spain	Intamin	2000	Operating
Rápidos del Orinoco	Isla Mágica	Spain	Intamin	1997	Operating
Rapids Raft Ride	Gyeongju World	South Korea	Hopkins Rides	Unknown	Operating
Rapids Raft Ride	Happy Valley Shenzhen	China	Hopkins Rides	1998	Operating
Rattlesnake Rapids	Lagoon	United States	Intamin	1997	Operating
Rattlesnake River	Wonderland Amusement Park	United States	Hopkins Rides	1988	Operating
Renegade Rapids	Six Flags America	United States	Hopkins Rides	1995	Operating
Renegade Rapids	Frontier City	United States	Hopkins Rides	1990	Operating
Rescate de Ulises	Terra Mítica	Spain	Hafema	2000	Operating
Rio Bravo	Europark	France	Interlink	Unknown	Operating
Rio Bravo	Hopi Hari	Brazil	Intamin	1999	Operating
Rio Bravo	Mirabilandia	Italy	Intamin	1992	Operating
Rio Dorado	Hansa-Park	Germany	WhiteWater West	2000	Operating
Rio Grande	Fort Fun Abenteuerland	Germany	Bear Rides	1997	Operating
Rio Grande Rafting	Djurs Sommerland	Denmark	Interlink	1997	Operating
Rio Grande Rapids	Enchanted Kingdom	Philippines	Hopkins Rides	2001	Operating
Rio Loco	SeaWorld San Antonio	United States	Intamin	1993	Operating
Río Navajo	Parque de Atracciones de Zaragoza	Spain	Intamin	2003	Operating
Río Rápido	Bosque Magico	Mexico	Hopkins Rides	1995	Removed
Río Rápido	Parque Bicentenario Querétaro	Mexico	Hafema	2009	Operating
Río Salvaje	Six Flags México	Mexico	Intamin	1992	Operating
Rip Roarin' Rapids	Carowinds	United States	Intamin	1982	Removed
Rip Roaring Rapids	California's Great America	United States	Intamin	1988	Operating
River Quest	Phantasialand	Germany	Hafema	2002	Operating
River Raft	Hainan Tropical Sea World	China	Hopkins Rides	Unknown	Removed
River Rafting Ride	Wonderland	United Arab Emirates	Hopkins Rides	1998	Removed
River Splash	Steinwasen Park	Germany	ABC Rides	2007	Operating
River Splash Ride	Hello Kitty Park	China	ABC Rides	2015	Operating
Rivière Sauvage	Mer de Sable	France	Soquet	1988	Operating
Roaring Rapids	Six Flags Great America	United States	Intamin	1984	Operating
Roaring Rapids	Six Flags Magic Mountain	United States	Intamin	1981	Operating
Roaring Rapids	Six Flags Over Texas	United States	Intamin	1983	Operating
Roaring Rapids	Shanghai Disneyland	China	Sansei Technologies	2016	Operating
Rocky Mountain Rapids	American Adventure	United Kingdom	Interlink	1989	Removed
Roman Rapids	Busch Gardens Williamsburg	United States	Intamin	1988	Operating
Romus et Rapidus	Parc Astérix	France	Intamin	1989	Operating
Rumba Rapids	Thorpe Park	United Kingdom	Intamin	1987	Closed
Saw Mill Splash	Adventureland	United States	WhiteWater West	2002	Operating
Shipwreck Rapids	SeaWorld San Diego	United States	Intamin	1999	Operating
Sky Rafting	Skyline Park	Germany	ABC Rides	2010	Operating
Smoky Mountain River Rampage	Dollywood	United States	Intamin	1986	Operating
Snowy River Rampage	Wonderland Sydney	Australia	Intamin	1985	Removed
Splash Water Falls	Six Flags New England	United States	WhiteWater West	2006	Operating
Storm Surge	Thorpe Park	United Kingdom	WhiteWater West	2011	Operating
Sungai Kalimantan	Avonturenpark Hellendoorn	Netherlands	Bear Rides	1997	Operating
Tasmanian River Rapids	Wild Adventures	United States	Hafema	2000	Operating
The Gully Washer	Six Flags Fiesta Texas	United States	Intamin	1992	Operating
The Penguin's Blizzard River	Six Flags America	United States	WhiteWater West	2003	Operating
The Rapids	Ocean Park	China; Hong Kong	Intamin	2011	Operating
Thunder Canyon	Cedar Point	United States	Intamin	1986	Operating
Thunder Canyon	Dorney Park	United States	Barr Engineering	1995	Operating
Thunder Canyon	Silverwood Theme Park	United States	Hopkins Rides	1993	Operating
Thunder Canyon	Valleyfair	United States	Barr Engineering	1987	Operating
Thunder Rapids	Lake Compounce	United States	Hopkins Rides	1997	Operating
Thunder River	Six Flags AstroWorld	United States	Intamin	1980	Removed
Thunder River	Six Flags Over Georgia	United States	Intamin	1982	Operating
Thunder River	Six Flags St. Louis	United States	Intamin	1983	Operating
Thunder River Rapids Ride	Dreamworld	Australia	Unknown	1986	Removed
Vikings' River Splash	Legoland Windsor	United Kingdom	ABC Rides	2007	Closed
Vikings' River Splash	Legoland Billund	Denmark	Intamin	2006	Operating
Waschzuber Rafting	Erlebnispark Tripsdrill	Germany	Hafema	1996	Operating
Wildalpenbahn	Wiener Prater	Austria	ABC Rides	2007	Operating
Wild Raft	Familienland Pillersee	Austria	Reverchon Industries	2007	Operating
Wild River Canyon	Lihpao Land	Taiwan	Hopkins Rides	1998	Operating
Wild River Gorge	Alabama Splash Adventure	United States	FAB	1999	Closed
Wild River Rafting	West Midland Safari Park	United Kingdom	Fabbri Group	2006	Operating
Wild River Rapids	Lightwater Valley	United Kingdom	Reverchon Industries	2009	Removed
Wildwasser Rafting	Bayern Park	Germany	ABC Rides	2007	Operating
White Water Canyon	Canada's Wonderland	Canada	Intamin	1984	Operating
White Water Canyon	Kings Dominion	United States	Intamin	1983	Operating
White Water Canyon	Kings Island	United States	Intamin	1985	Operating
White Water Safari	Six Flags Discovery Kingdom	United States	Intamin	1999	Operating
Unknown	Qingdao International Beer City	China	Hopkins Rides	1998	Removed
