= Roman Rapids =

White-water river rapids ride

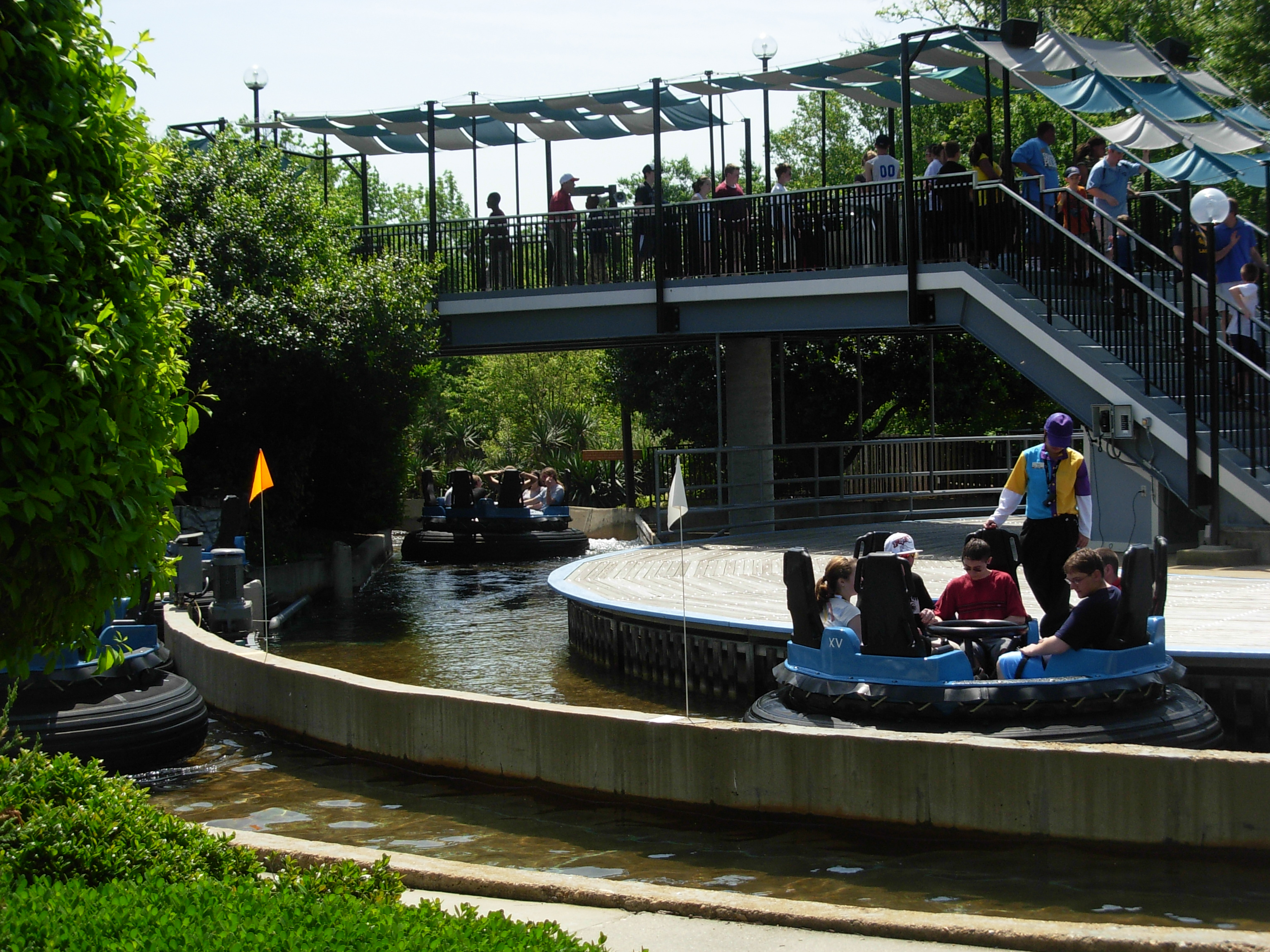

Busch Gardens Williamsburg
- Area: Festa Italia (Italy)
- Status: Operating
- Opening date: 1988

General statistics
- Type: River rafting ride
- Manufacturer: Intamin
- Height restriction: 42 in (107 cm)
- Boats: 9 riders per boat
- Quick Queue available

Roman Rapids is a white-water river rapids ride located in Festa Italia of Busch Gardens Williamsburg, Virginia. It is themed after a canal race through Roman ruins and leaves riders fully soaked after the ride. The Roman Rapids opened in 1988.

The Roman Rapids ride closed between Labor Day 2019 and May 26, 2023 due to Covid complications for a heavily staffed ride. During this closure, Roman Rapids received new nine-passenger rafts, a new turntable deck, and a new roof for its giftshop.

== Ride experience ==
Once riders board the raft, the moving platform the raft shortly bonds to releases its grips and sends the raft spinning off, slowly at first but reaching quick speeds at points. At first, riders are teased into thinking the ride is calm, but it soon picks up when water jets shoot water opposite the direction of the current, causing white water and rapids. After barely avoiding being drenched by a statue fountain, the raft spins by a balcony with twenty-five cent machines that activate water squirters that try to wet riders. After sliding down a short drop, the raft then races to a pool, keeping the raft on-track only by column ruins that look too far apart. Next, rapids carry the raft towards four large waterfalls which are almost impossible to not be drenched from. Passengers are then taken up a hill to be returned to the boarding platform. Due to the unpredictability of the rapids and the chain movement patterns at the station, riders will rarely go through the same experience on the ride twice (i.e. one person catching all 3 waterfalls at the end on one ride and the same person catching none the next time they ride).

The original raft seated six riders, but the newer rafts, introduced in 2022, are designed for nine passengers.

== See also ==
- Busch Gardens Williamsburg
