= Congo River Rapids (Alton Towers) =

River rapids water ride in Staffordshire, England

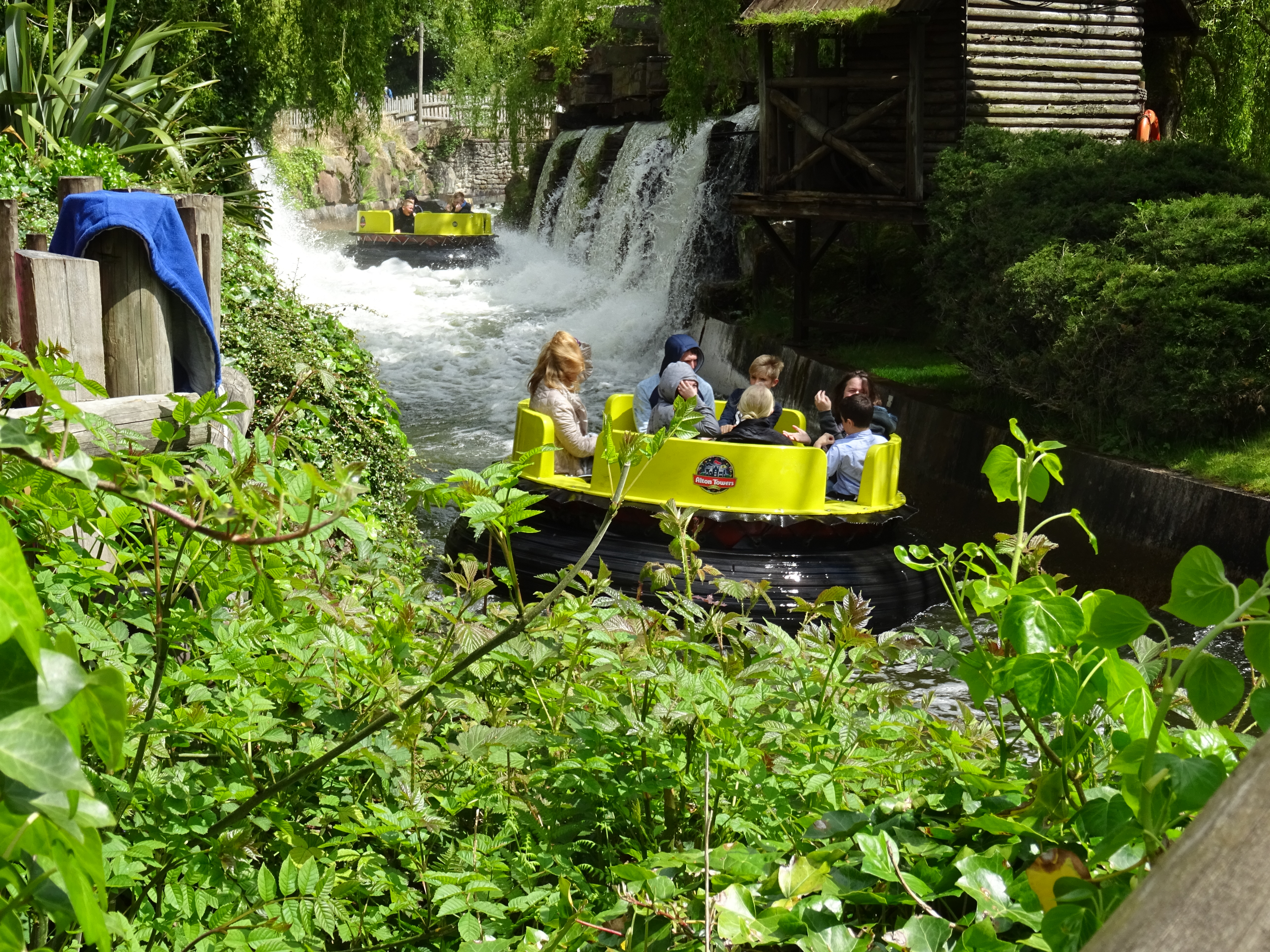
- Congo River Rapids

Alton Towers
- Area: Katanga Canyon
- Coordinates: 52.9893°N 1.88678°W
- Status: Operating
- Opening date: 1986

General statistics
- Type: River rapids ride
- Manufacturer: Intamin
- Lift system: Flatbed
- Length: 725 m (2,379 ft)
- Capacity: 2480 riders per hour
- Duration: 7.5 mins
- Boats: 35 boats. Riders are arranged 7 across in a single row for a total of 7 riders per boat.
- Restraint style: Ring in centre of raft & gates at each entry point
- Height restriction: 110 cm (3 ft 7 in)
- Previously known as: Grand Canyon Rapids

Congo River Rapids is a river rapids ride made by Intamin. It is located in the Katanga Canyon area of Alton Towers in Staffordshire, England.

The rapids come close to the Runaway Mine Train as it passes through the tunnel. It features twin waterfalls, and boats pass between the two waterfalls, along with three wave machines positioned at strategic points around the ride.

== History ==
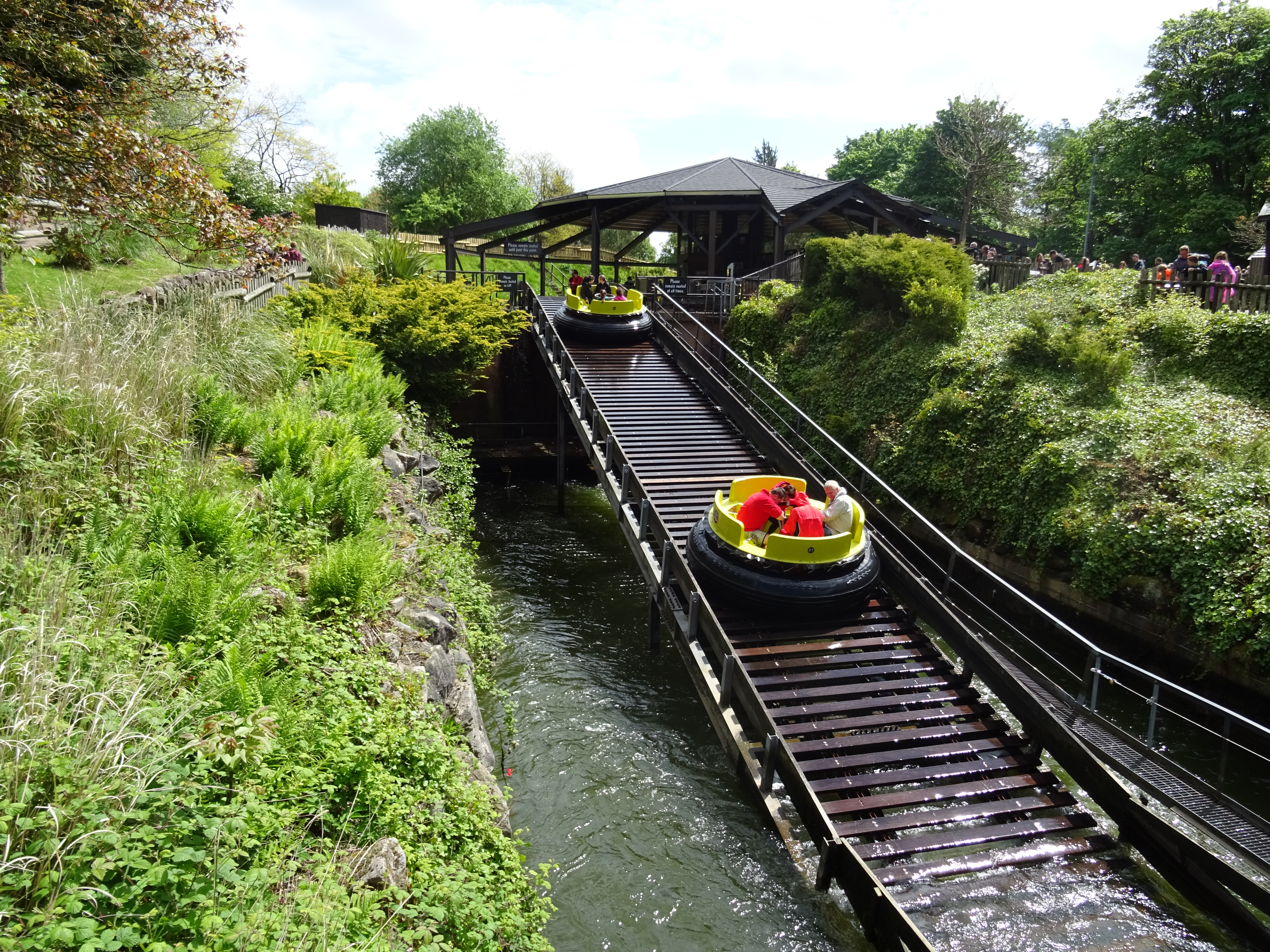
The lift hill to return boats to the station at the end of the layout, 2015

The ride first opened in 1986 as "Grand Canyon Rapids" and was named as part of the Aqua Land area. The ride's queueline was originally routed from the present day Mutiny Bay area, with the ride itself largely hidden from view.

In 1992, the Katanga Canyon area was built in the centre of the rapids circuit, along with the new Runaway Mine Train, allowing more views of the attraction. To suit the new area's theme, it was renamed "Congo River Rapids". The original red boats held six riders but were replaced in 2004 by yellow eight-passenger boats to increase throughput.

From the 2019 season, new restrictions from the park reduced each boat's capacity from 8 to 7 and barred all riders under the age of 18 from riding without an accompanying adult during school trip seasons. In 2023, a new soundtrack was added with additional announcements.

== Operation ==
The ride comprises three primary components: a flatbed lift, a concrete trough, and a continuously rotating turntable station designed to maximise throughput. Upon leaving the turntable, boats navigate a course through Katanga Canyon, passing through a tunnel shared with the Runaway Mine Train, alongside the Pizza Pasta restaurant, by cascading waterfalls, and back up the lift to return to the turntable. The turntable area also houses the ride’s pumping system, which circulates water from the base of the lift to the turntable level.

The rapids effect is primarily achieved through the strategic placement of wooden blocks secured to the bottom of the concrete channel. When the pumps are active, water flowing over these blocks generates turbulence, simulating natural rapids. Previously, three 'wavemaker' machines at points along the circuit also added to the rapids but no longer operate.

The ride originally operated with 35 eight-person boats, though only 31 could be simultaneously deployed on the system. Currently, a substantially smaller number of boats are in regular service.

== Gallery ==
Ride boats

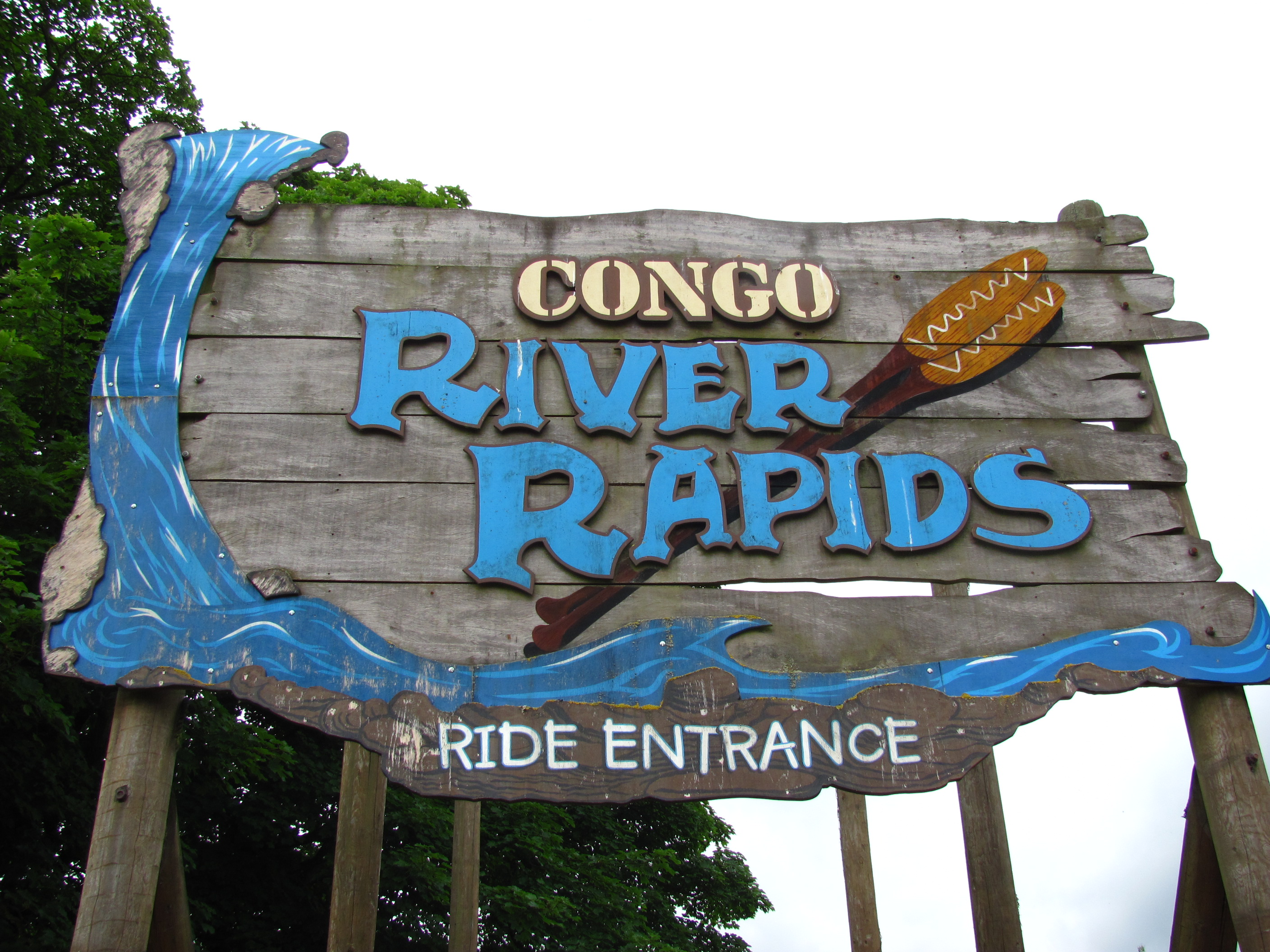
Ride entrance
