= Roaring Rapids =

Series of river rapids rides

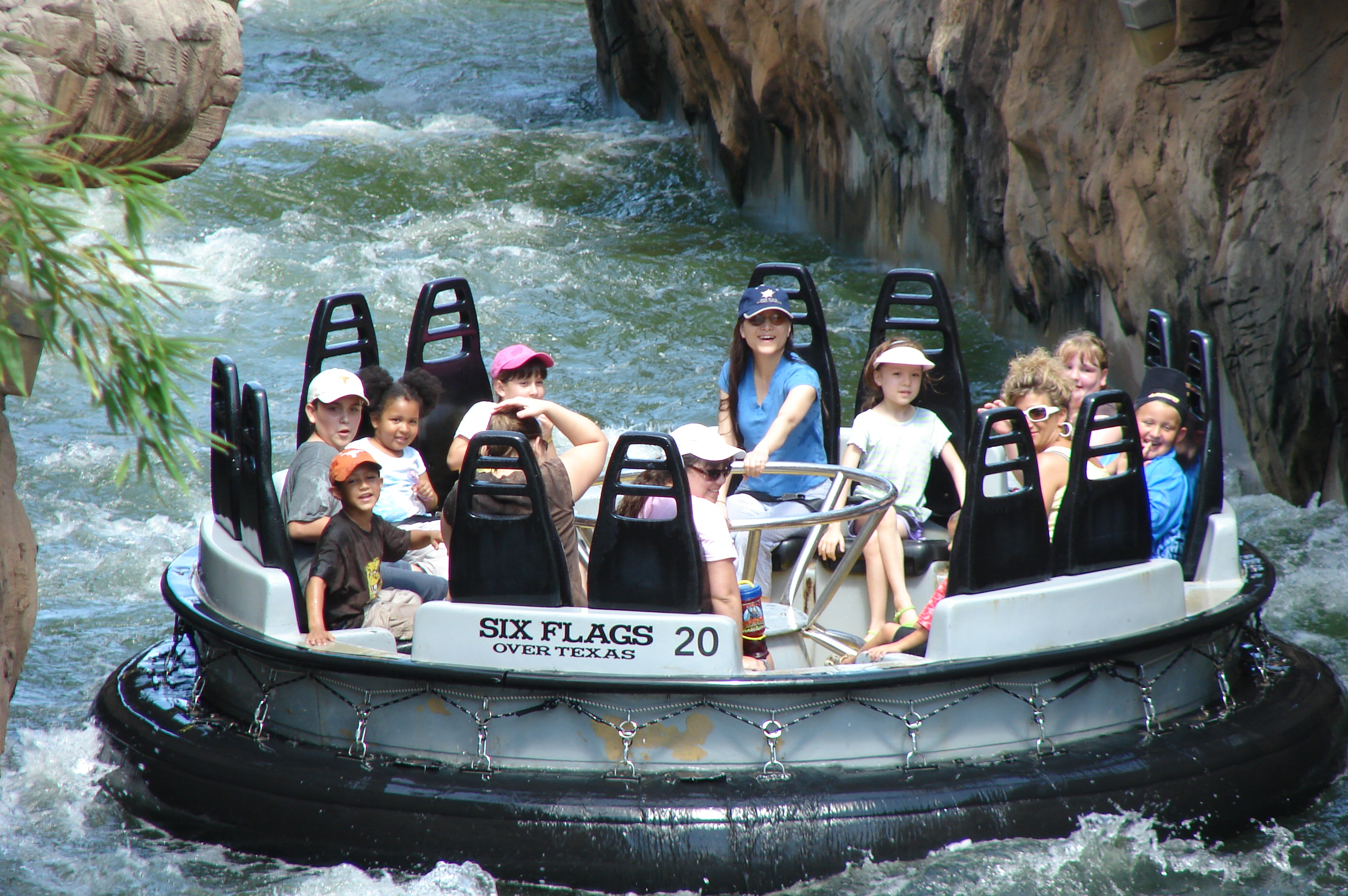
- Roaring Rapids at Six Flags Over Texas

Six Flags Magic Mountain
- Area: Rapids Camp Crossing
- Status: Operating
- Opening date: 1981

Six Flags Over Texas
- Area: Tower
- Status: Operating
- Opening date: 1983

Six Flags Great America
- Area: Mardi Gras
- Status: Operating
- Opening date: 1984
- Replaced: Traffique Jam

Six Flags Great Adventure
- Area: The Pine Barrens
- Status: Operating
- Opening date: 1981

General statistics
- Manufacturer: Intamin
- Lift system: 1 lift hill
- Restraint style: Seat Belts
- Height restriction: 36 in (91 cm)
- Fast Lane Available at all four parks

Roaring Rapids is a river rapids ride located at multiple Six Flags parks.

== History ==
Six Flags Astroworld and Intamin partnered in 1979 to build the world's first river rapids ride in 1980 called Thunder River. The water ride became so popular at Astroworld that Six Flags debuted two new river rapids in 1981 at Six Flags Magic Mountain, in 1983 at Six Flags Over Texas, and in 1984 at Six Flags Great America. The version at Six Flags Over Texas features a dual loading station where boats can be loaded at twice the rate of one loading station. The Magic Mountain version doesn't feature a dual loading station but is built to feature one. The Great America version also doesn't feature a dual loading station but features a turning station where the station moves in a circle with the boat where riders can depart and get on. The Six Flags Over Texas and Six Flags Magic Mountain rides operate from spring to the end of Fright Fest in October. The Six Flags Great America ride operates from spring to around Labor Day. At some parks, the ride is transformed into a Fright Fest maze during October. At Six Flags Over Texas the ride is closed during both Fright Fest and Holiday in the park.

The Six Flags Great America version closed for the entire season in 2021 due to a $1,000,000 refurbishment on the ride, and closed for half of the season in 2022, but later re-opened on July 30, 2022. The Six Flags Magic Mountain version was closed for the entirety of the 2022 season and half of the 2023 season for an unknown reason, but reopened on July 3, 2023.

The ride made an appearance in a Kidsongs episode, "Ride the Roller Coaster".

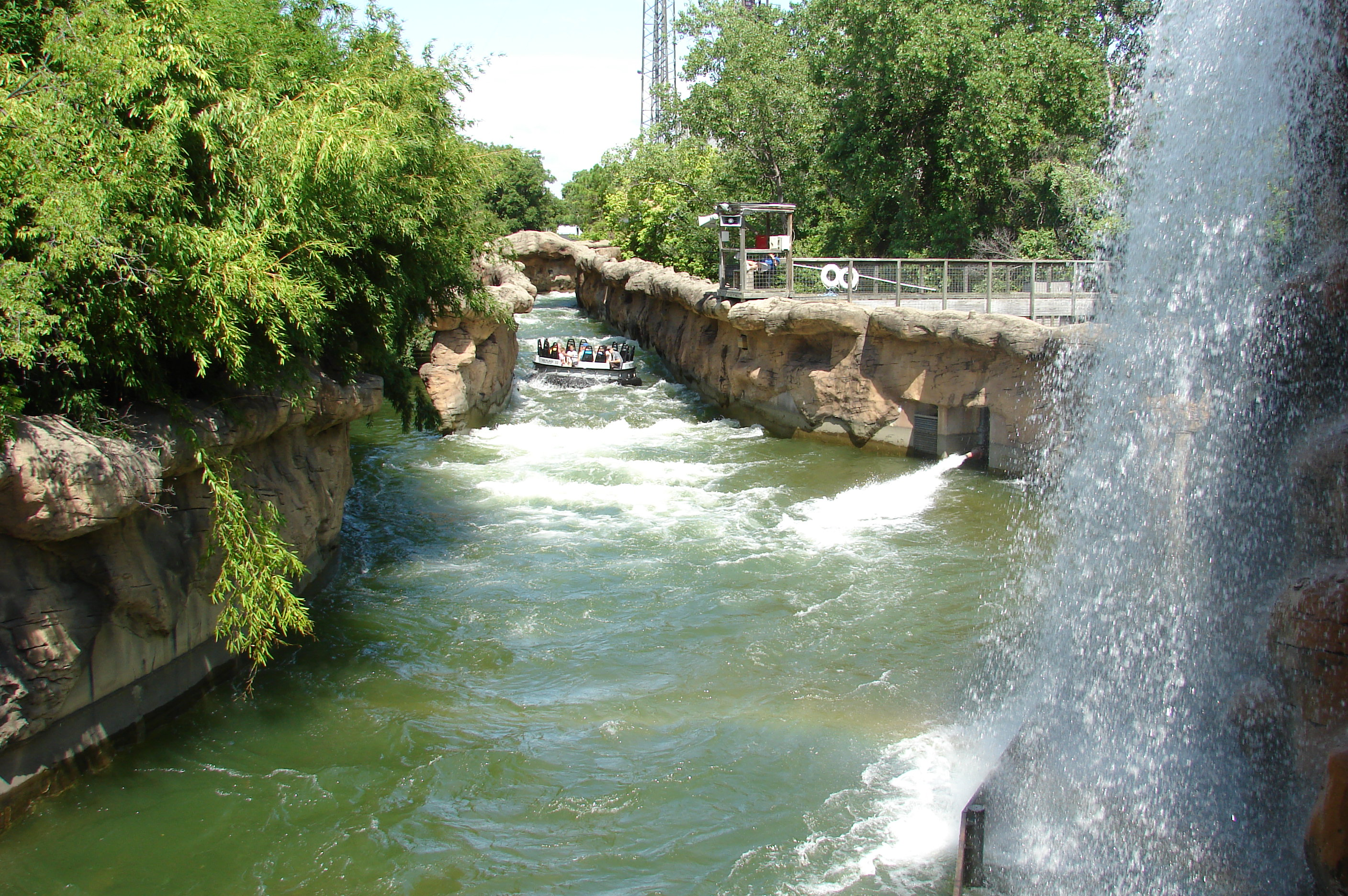
Roaring Rapids at Six Flags Over Texas

== Ride ==
Once the twelve riders strap themselves into one of the boats, the boat then leaves the station to the artificial river that is shaped like an oval at Over Texas and Magic Mountain. The twelve riders at Great America's version go through a unique course rather than in an oval. During all three rides, different objects are in the water that disrupt the flow of the river that creating the rapids. Six Flags Over Texas and Six Flags Great America's versions feature waterfalls towards the end as another way to get passengers completely soaked. Once riders go through the full course of the ride, the boat will then reach the lift and be taken back to the station.

== Incidents ==
On March 21, 1999, a 28-year-old woman died at Six Flags Over Texas, and 10 other guests were injured, when the raft they were on overturned in 2–3 feet of water due to sudden deflation of the air chambers that support the raft. The raft then got caught on an underwater pipe, which provided leverage for the rushing water in the ride to flip the raft over. In a subsequent settlement, Six Flags agreed to pay US$4 million to the victim's family, and the company would join the family in a lawsuit against Canyon Manufacturing Co., the company responsible for parts that were related to the accident.

On July 15, 2012, a goose was trapped in the conveyor belt of the ride and would not fly away despite the attempts of the ride's staff; the staff decided to let the ride proceed, thus killing the goose. A goose endangerment protection organization requested that the U.S. Department of Agriculture (USDA) investigate the incident. A Six Flags spokeswoman defended the staff's decision to not endanger passengers' lives by saving the goose, as evacuating the passengers would have involved flushing the rafts into the ride's reservoir and having the riders exit the raft by a rope climb.

== See also ==
- Thunder River
