= Kali River Rapids =

Attraction at Disney's Animal Kingdom

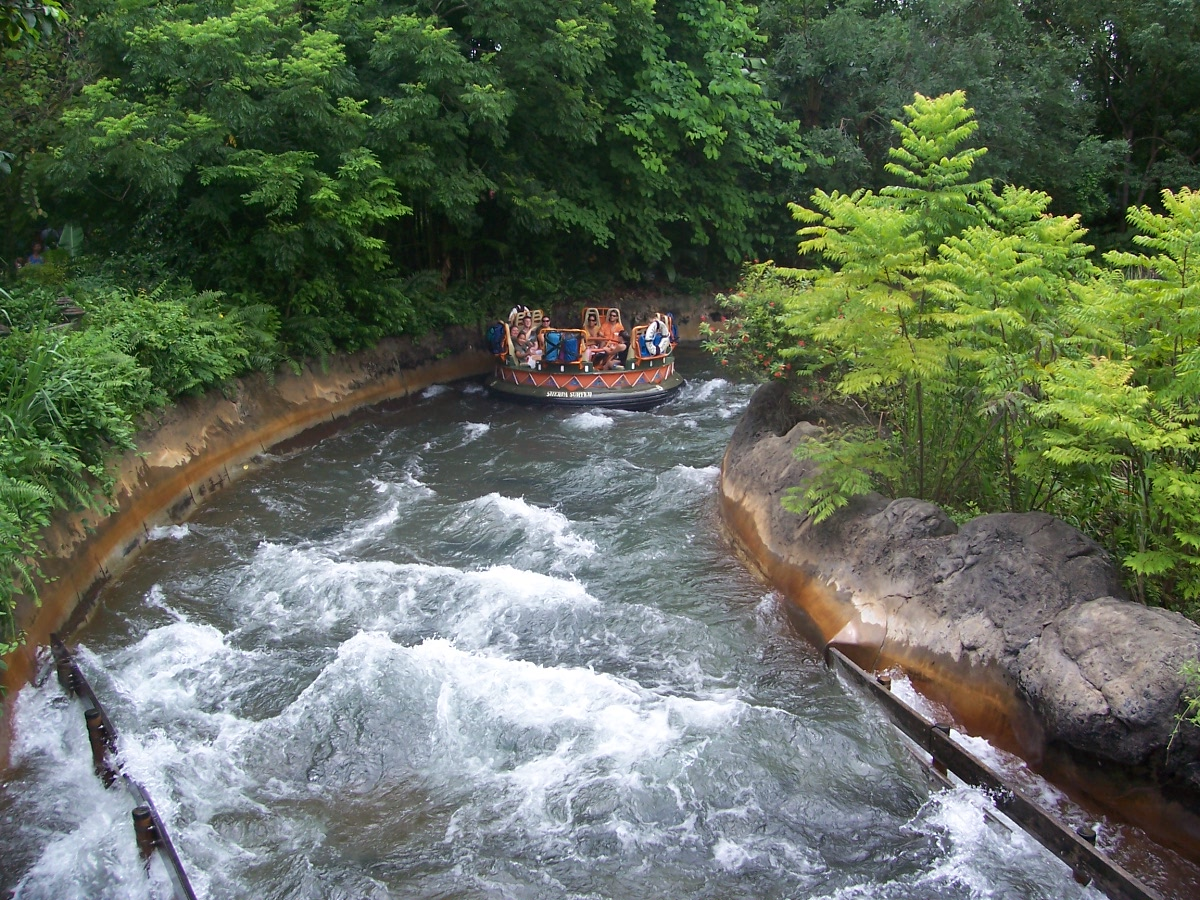
- The raft of the ride and river

Disney's Animal Kingdom
- Area: Asia
- Coordinates: 28°21′34.31″N 81°35′17.12″W
- Status: Operating
- Opening date: March 18, 1999

General statistics
- Type: River rapids ride
- Manufacturer: Intamin
- Designer: Walt Disney Imagineering
- Lift system: Conveyor belt
- Drop: 30 ft (9.1 m)
- Duration: 5:00
- Boats: 20 boats. Riders are arranged 1 across in 12 rows for a total of 12 riders per boat.
- Height restriction: 38 in (97 cm)
- Lightning Lane available
- Must transfer from wheelchair

Kali River Rapids (originally named Tiger Rapids Run before opening) is a river rapids attraction at the Disney's Animal Kingdom theme park of the Walt Disney World resort, in the Asia section of the park. It is themed as a rafting expedition along the Chakranadi River, courtesy of Kali Rapids Expeditions. In keeping with Disney's Animal Kingdom's message of conservation and environmental protection, the attraction is themed around illegal logging and habitat destruction.

== Ride experience ==
=== Queue ===
The queue winds through temples and shops, passing by ancient, decaying statues, shrines, overgrown ruins, and lush landscapes, ending in the rafting offices of the fictional Kali Rapids Expeditions. In keeping with the theme against illegal logging, chainsaws can be heard in the forest near the queue. Inside the rafting offices, visitors pass a television screen on which the proprietor of Kali Rapids Expeditions explains their company's mission: to show visitors the natural beauty of the area and demonstrate that there are non-destructive ways to bring revenue to their village. Just before reaching the loading area, a radio transmission warns that illegal loggers have moved dangerously close to the river.

=== Main ride ===
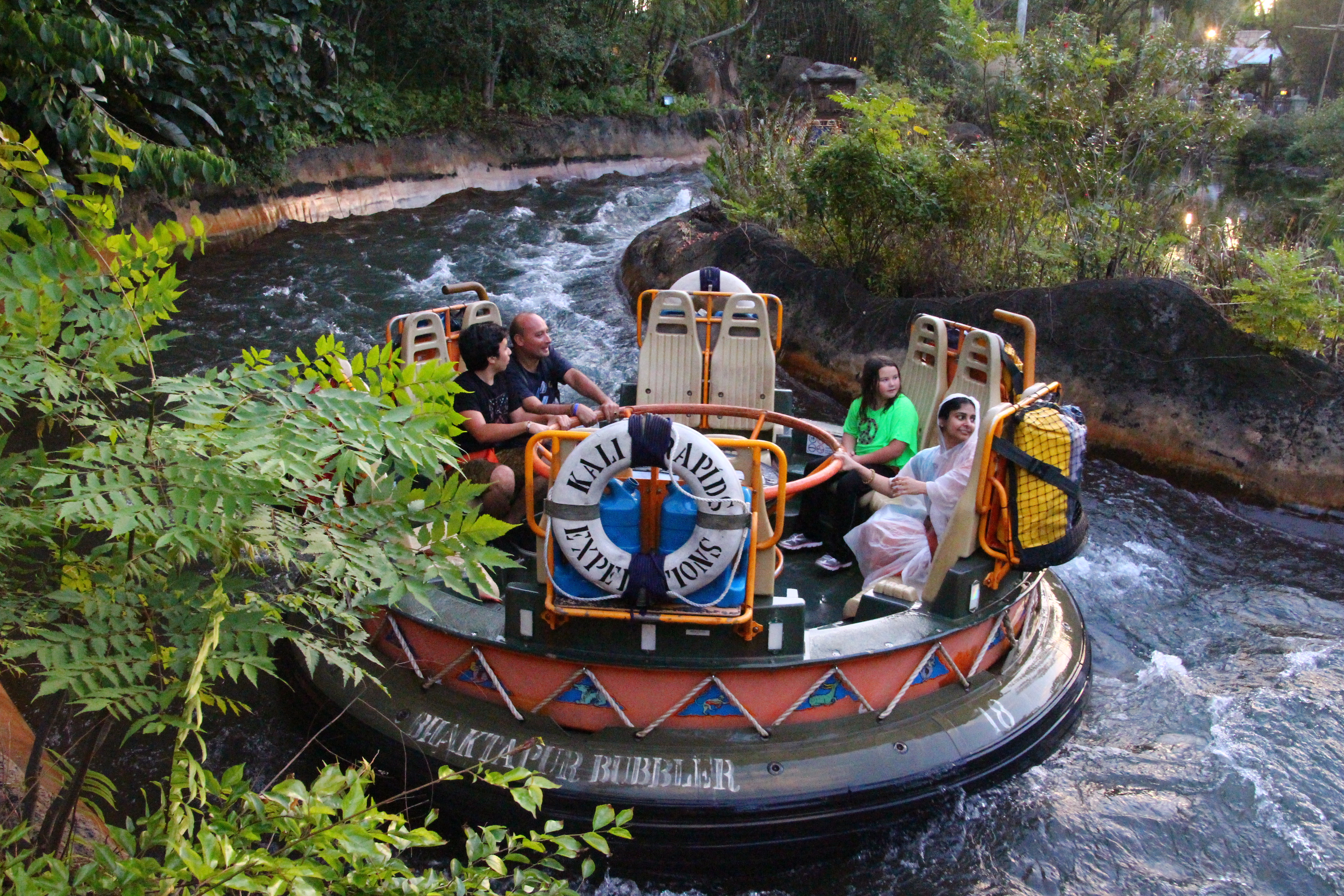
Kali River Rapids raft

Moving into the brightly colored wooden pagoda, decorated with Tibetan prayer flags, riders are loaded from a rotating platform into 12-person rafts. The rafts have names such as Kathmandoozy, Himalayan Hummer, Manaslu Slammer, Bhaktapur Bubbler, and Sherpa Surfer.

As the rafts leave the dock, riders begin their adventure on the Chakranadi River, first ascending a 90-foot lift hill through jasmine and ginger scented mist. Once at the top, the raft floats through the path of gushing geysers, past a waterfall and rock formation that forms the face of a tiger, and on through a dense tropical jungle where countless animal and bird calls can be heard.

The water becomes choppier, and riders hear the sound of chainsaws and the smell of smoke. Around the bend, the lush vegetation gives way to charred tree stumps, and a fully loaded logging truck, which has slid perilously into the river, tries in vain to drive itself out.

Moving further into a gargantuan pile of charred tree trunks, the raft passes through a flaming bridge of felled wood (Note: An effect only visible at nighttime.) and then plummets down a 30-foot slide, soaking everyone in the resulting waves. Careening down the rapids, the raft passes waterfalls cascading down a granite rock face, before spinning and bumping its way along the whitewater.

Passing through a cave, riders are dampened further by dripping water, and by statues of water-carriers which spray water jets. Finally, the raft passes beneath a wooden bridge and past statues of elephants which also shoot water. At this point the raft returns to the loading pagoda and riders disembark.

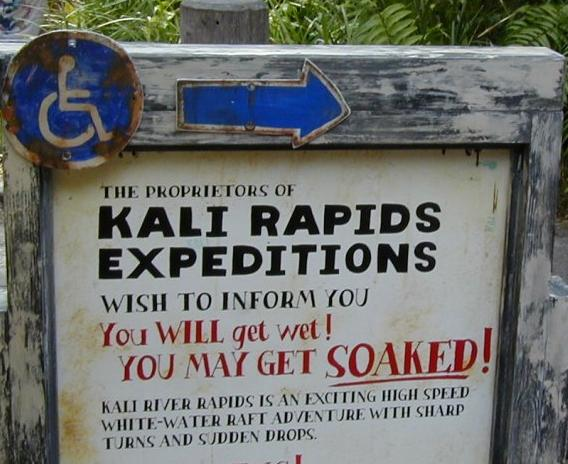
A warning sign at the entrance of Kali River Rapids, advising the possibility of getting wet or soaked during the ride experience.

== Incidents ==
The ride was briefly closed on May 29, 2007 after five visitors and one employee received minor injuries as a result of an evacuation platform malfunction.

== See also ==
- Grizzly River Run at Disney California Adventure
- Roaring Rapids at Shanghai Disneyland
