= Piraña (Efteling) =

River rapids ride

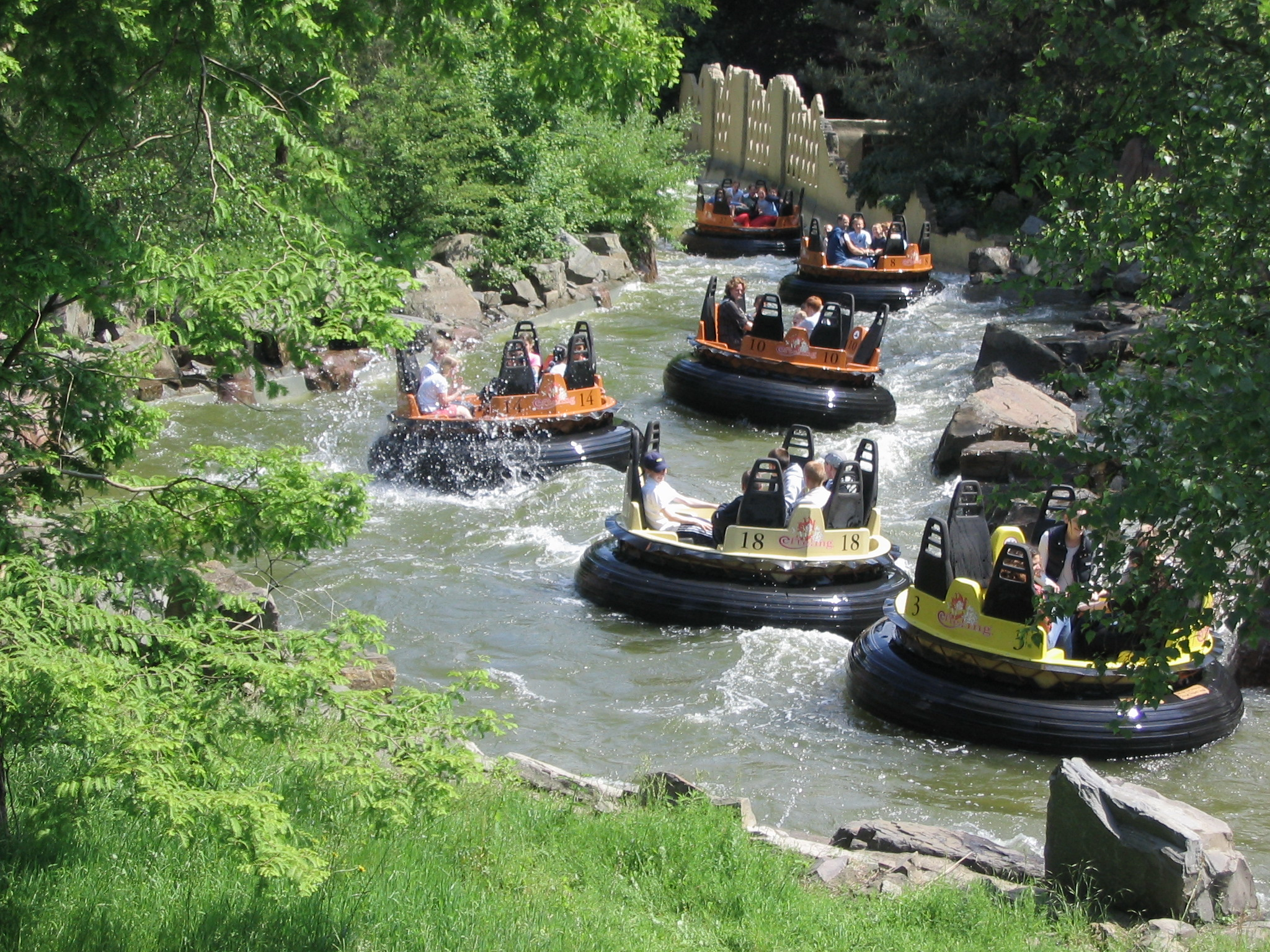

Efteling
- Area: Anderrijk
- Coordinates: 51.6472°N 5.0489°E
- Status: Operating
- Cost: € 7.25 million
- Opening date: May 18, 1983

Ride statistics
- Attraction type: River rapids ride
- Manufacturer: Intamin
- Designer: Ton van de Ven, Karel Willemen
- Length: 520 m (1,710 ft)
- Speed: 20 km/h (12 mph)
- Capacity: 2000 riders per hour
- Vehicle type: Raft
- Vehicles: 35
- Height restriction: 120 cm (3 ft 11 in)
- Wheelchair accessible
- Must transfer from wheelchair

Piraña is a river rapids ride in amusement park Efteling in the Netherlands. It was designed by Ton van de Ven, built by Intamin, and opened in 1983.

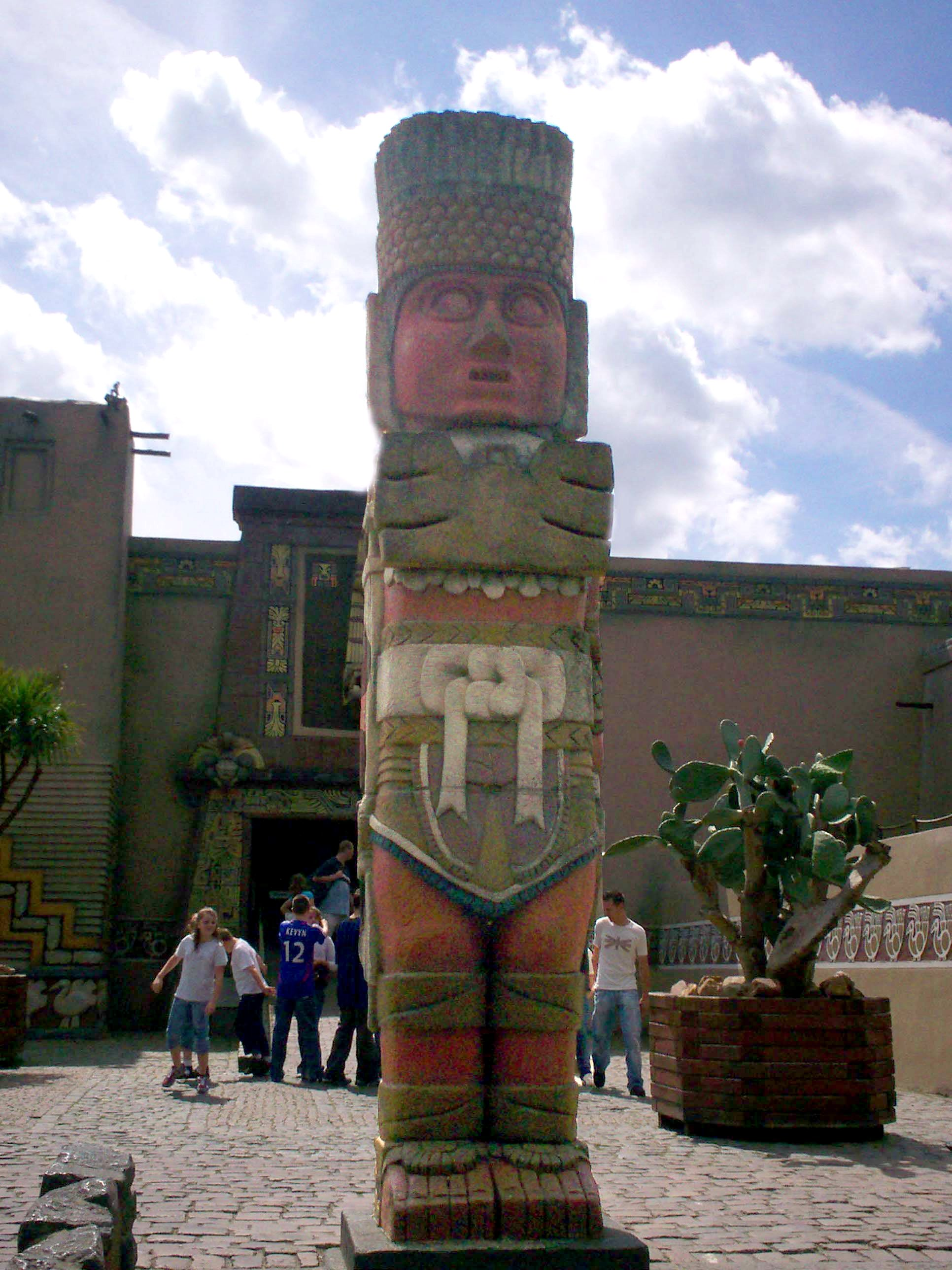
Teotihuacan warrior

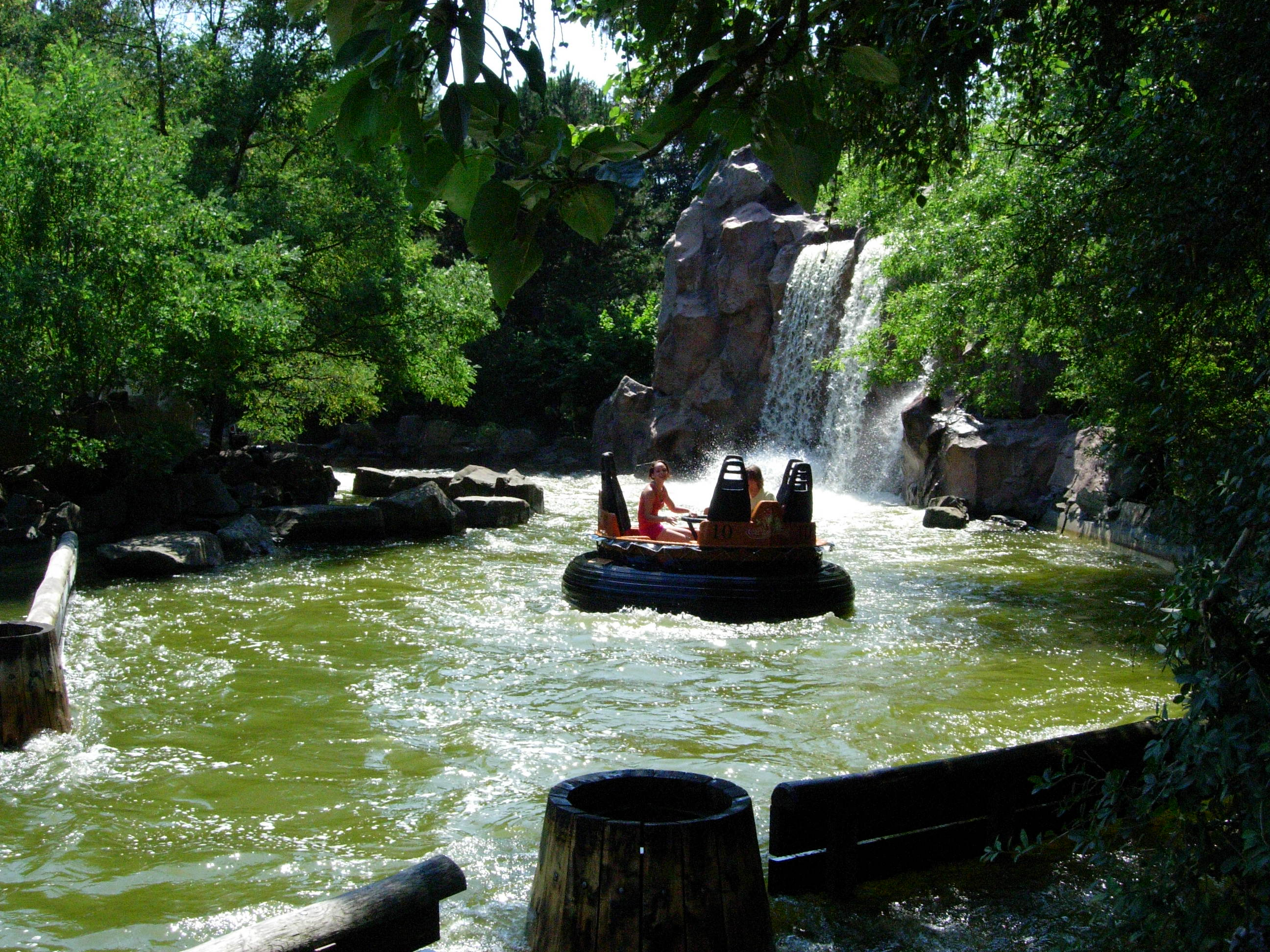
End of the ride

== History and details ==
The ride is one of many attractions since the 80’s to diversify in more than just a fairy-tale park. House designer van de Ven took Intamin’s design, as implemented in Six Flags’s Roaring Rapids (Texas, amongst others) and expanded it into a pre-Columbian thematic ride. Originally planned for 1982, the extensive architecture delayed the opening to 1983. As with earlier attractions, the entire landscape and service outlets in the area were remodeled to fit the unique design. The four pumps of the ride propulse 10 million litres of water per hour.

In 2023, the ride closed for an €8 million renovation. Seven months later, the ride reopened.

== The ride ==
The ride starts with a descent through a dark tunnel, which opens up into a broad section of rapids . The rafts then pass two waterfalls. After this the river narrows. After the waterfalls there is a narrow passage with another overpass. The rapids get more intense throughout the ride, until it passes the narrow pass. After this pass it will drift between two waterfalls . After passing the last waterfall the ride ends with more intense rapids. From the exit a walk can be made around the ride, using Inca rope bridges.

The ride is based on pre-Columbian cultures, which can be seen here:

- The whole building is covered with chibcha decorations
- Square before the ride’s entrance: Chac-mool themed waste dispenser (Mayan/Toltec)
- Ride entrance: two giant Teotihuacan warrior atlantes. Above the gate we see Quetzalcoatl (Mixtec, Toltec, Aztec). At the side of the entrance two typical Mayan heads are displayed.
- Boarding area: typical colorful Tahuantinsuyu banners, windows and oversized Tumis decorate this area.
- The ride: Tiwanaku Inca style walls can be seen at the beginning. Further on we see the Teotihuacan sungod Con-tici Viracocha, other Chavin animal-like decorations and a ceremonial figure conclude the ride.
