= Thunder River (ride) =

American amusement park ride

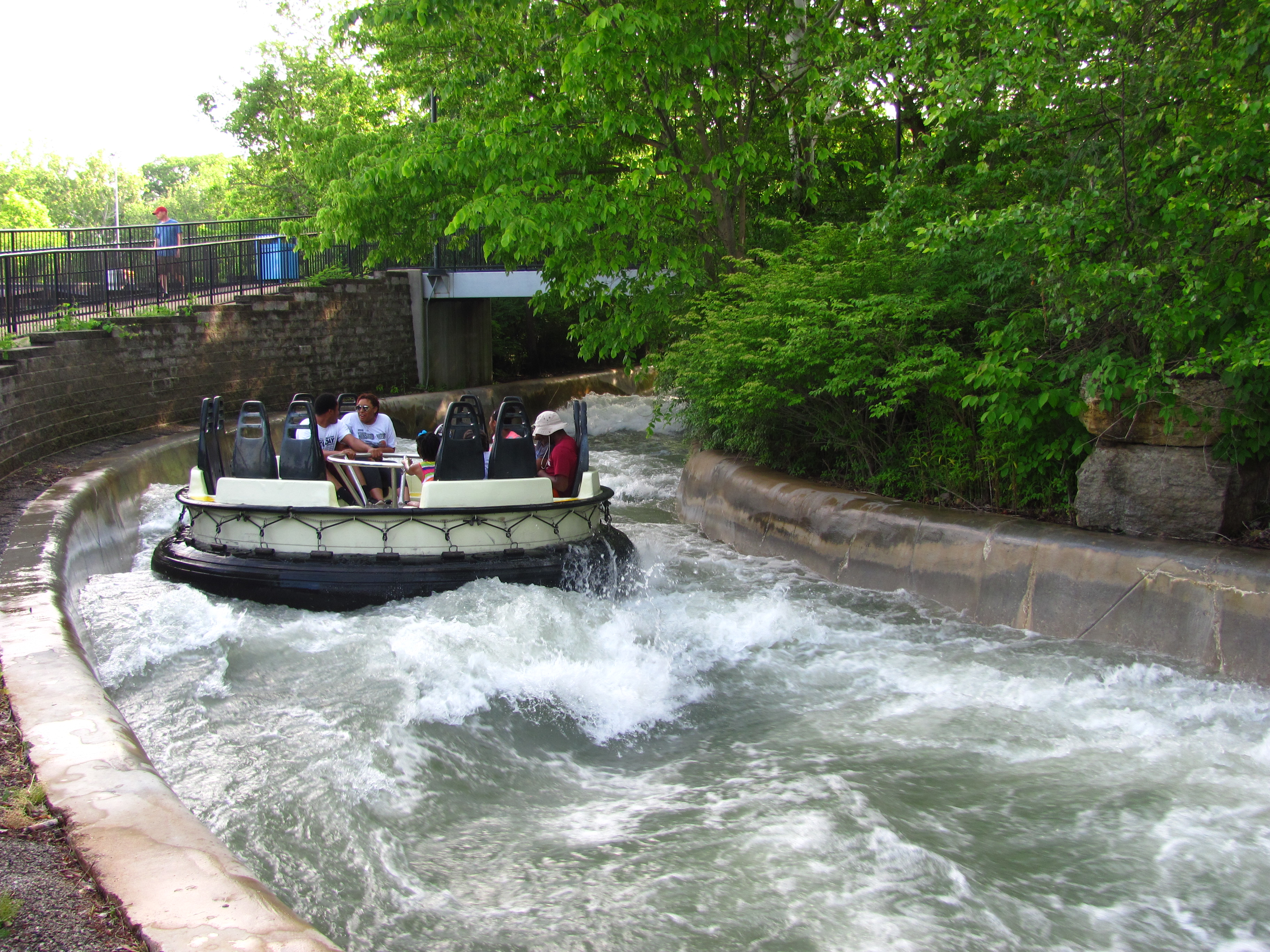
- Thunder River at Mid America Adventure.

Six Flags AstroWorld
- Area: Oriental Village
- Status: Removed
- Opening date: 1980
- Closing date: October 30, 2005

Six Flags Over Georgia
- Area: Lickskillet
- Status: Operating
- Opening date: 1982

Mid America Adventure
- Area: Gateway To The West
- Status: Operating
- Opening date: April 1983

General statistics
- Manufacturer: Intamin
- Lift system: 1 lift hill
- Restraint style: Seat Belts
- Height restriction: 36 in (91 cm)
- Fast Lane Available at both

Thunder River is a river rapids ride located at two American amusement parks. The first opened in 1980 at Six Flags AstroWorld in Houston, Texas, which was the first of its kind in the world. The popularity led to other similar installations at various Six Flags theme parks throughout the 1980s. Only two with this name remain. One currently operates at Six Flags Over Georgia in Austell, Georgia; the other operates at Mid America Adventure in Eureka, Missouri.

== History ==
The original Thunder River at Six Flags AstroWorld was the brainchild of the park's general manager, Bill Crandall. He enjoyed white water rafting and was intrigued with the artificial river created for the canoe/kayaking slalom competition at the 1972 Summer Olympics in Munich, Germany. While watching the competition he came up with the idea of adapting the concept into an amusement park attraction. Six Flags partnered with Intamin Amusements Rides and Crandall worked closely with the company for seven years. Following six months of construction, the world's first river rapids ride opened at AstroWorld in 1980.

The Six Flags marketing team came up with the name Thunder River. Being the prototype, the ride was plagued with operational difficulties the first year, but changes were made to the original and those design changes were implemented in subsequent installations. The water ride became popular leading to six more river rapids installations at other Six Flags theme parks in the 1980s, including Six Flags Over Georgia in 1982 and at Six Flags St. Louis in 1983 both of which were also named Thunder River.

Thunder River at Six Flags AstroWorld was closed throughout the 2001 season, but it reopened in 2002 following a major refurbishment. AstroWorld, and subsequently Thunder River, closed permanently following the 2005 season.

== Ride ==
Once the twelve riders strap themselves into one of the boats, the boat then leaves the station to the man-made river that is shaped like an oval at Over Georgia as well as at the former AstroWorld. The twelve riders at St. Louis' version go through a unique circle around the Mr. Freeze: Reverse Blast roller coaster.

During all three river rapids, there are different objects in the water which disrupt the flow of the water, thus creating the rapids in the river. All three river rapids feature waterfalls at the end of the ride, thereby getting riders completely soaked. At the end of the ride the boat is taken back to the station by a lift. Thunder River operates from spring to the end of the season in October.

=== Mid America Adventure ===
The boat makes a right turn where the ride operator interacts with people. Then water comes shooting out of the first sprayer and soaks the riders, then water comes shooting out of the second sprayer and soaks the riders, then the ride operator starts talking and the boat goes through big rapids while making a right turn into a short tunnel. Then the rapids get smaller and smaller as the boat moves forward. Then the boat goes through a long tunnel. And goes through 3 small rapids. Then the boat comes toward a waterfall. Then the boat makes one last right turn and catches onto the conveyor belt lift hill and enters the station.

== See also ==
- White Water Canyon
- Thunder Canyon
- Roaring Rapids
