= 2016 in amusement parks =

This article is a list of events and openings related to amusement parks that occurred in 2016. These various lists are not exhaustive.

== Amusement parks ==
=== Opening ===
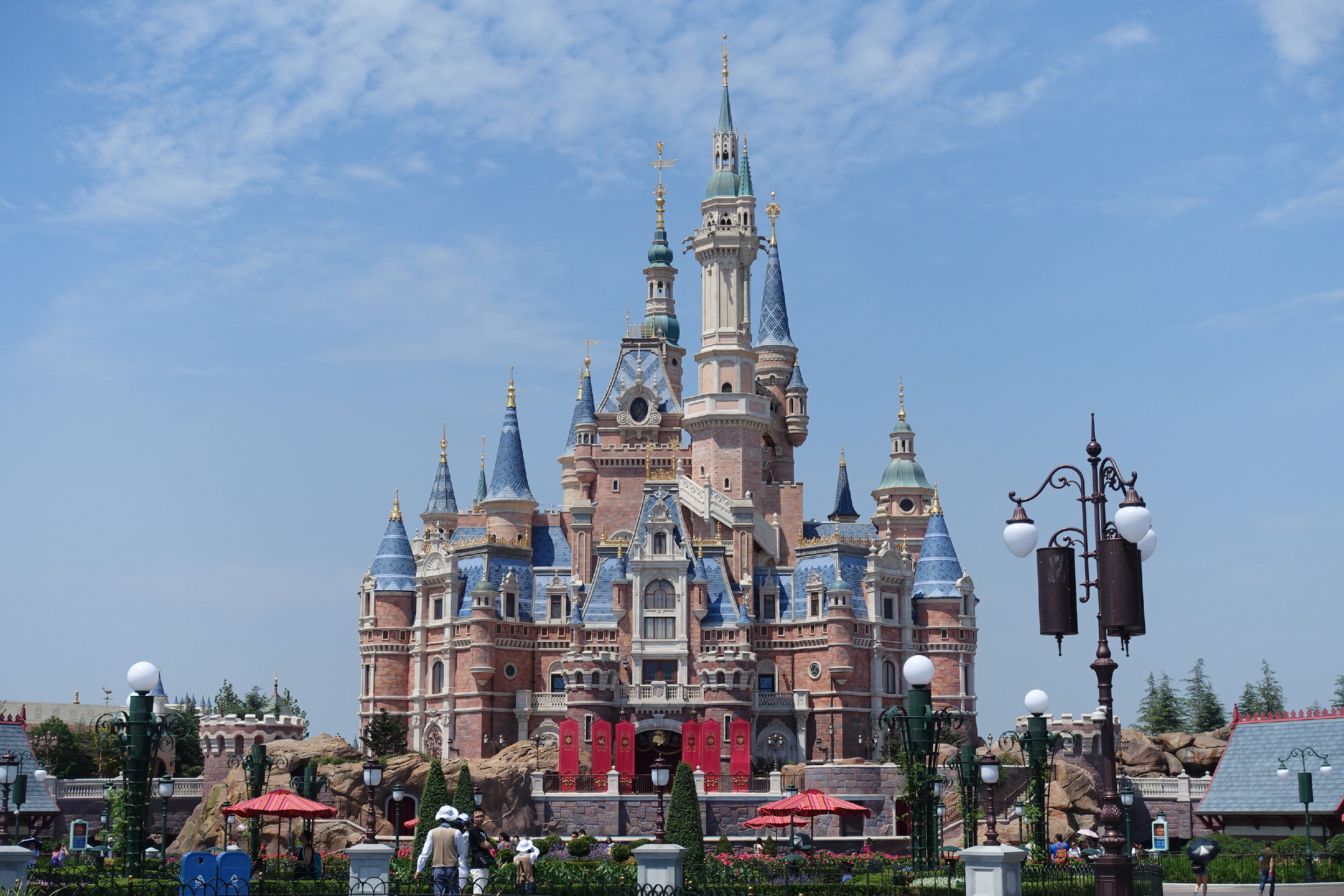
Shanghai Disneyland opened in June.

- China Nanchang Wanda Park – May 27
- China Shanghai Disneyland – June 16
- UAE IMG Worlds of Adventure – August 31
- UAE Legoland Dubai – October 31
- UAE Bollywood Parks Dubai – November 15
- UAE Motiongate Dubai – December 16
- United States Ark Encounter – July 7

=== Reopened ===
- Italy LunEur – 2016

=== Birthday ===
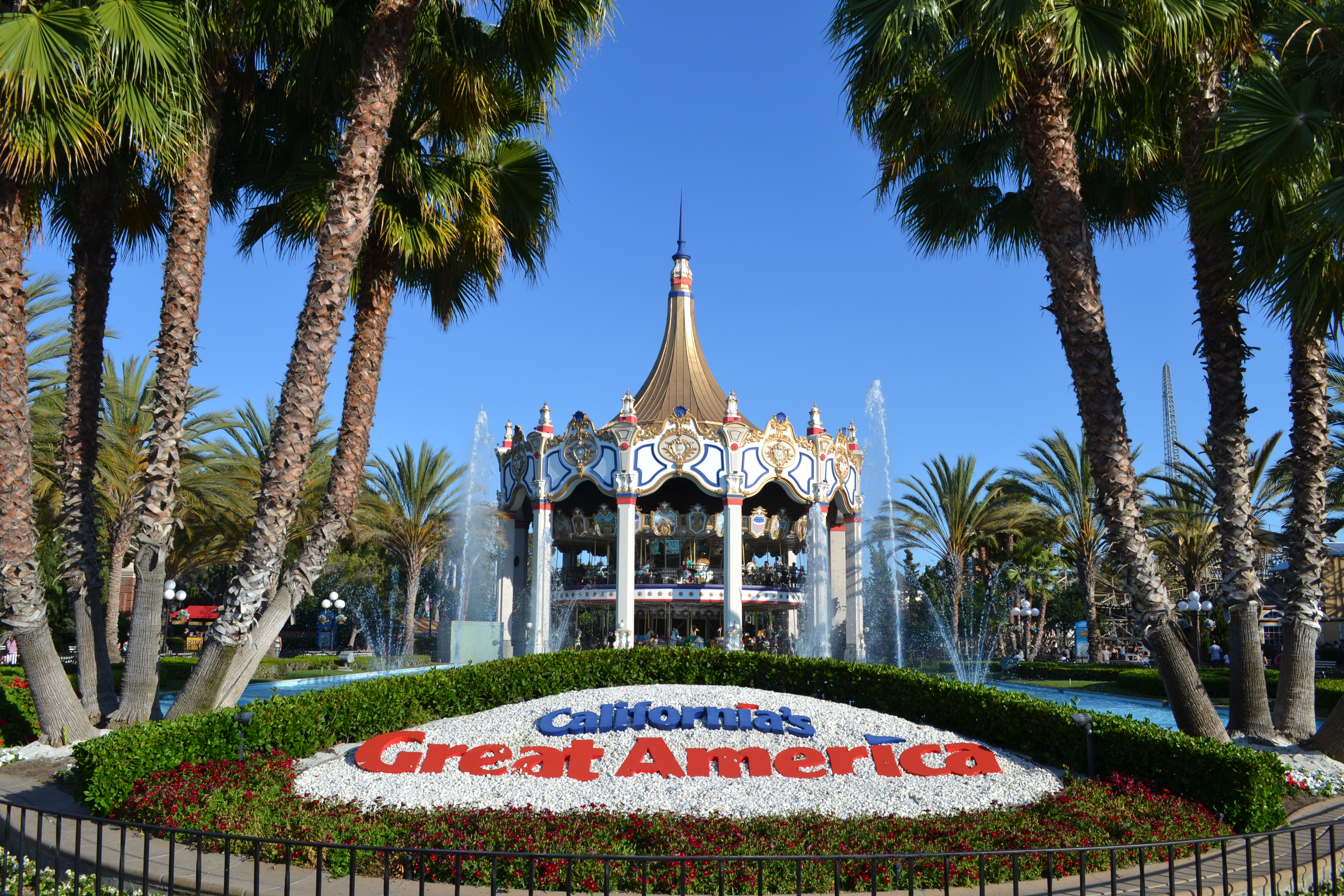
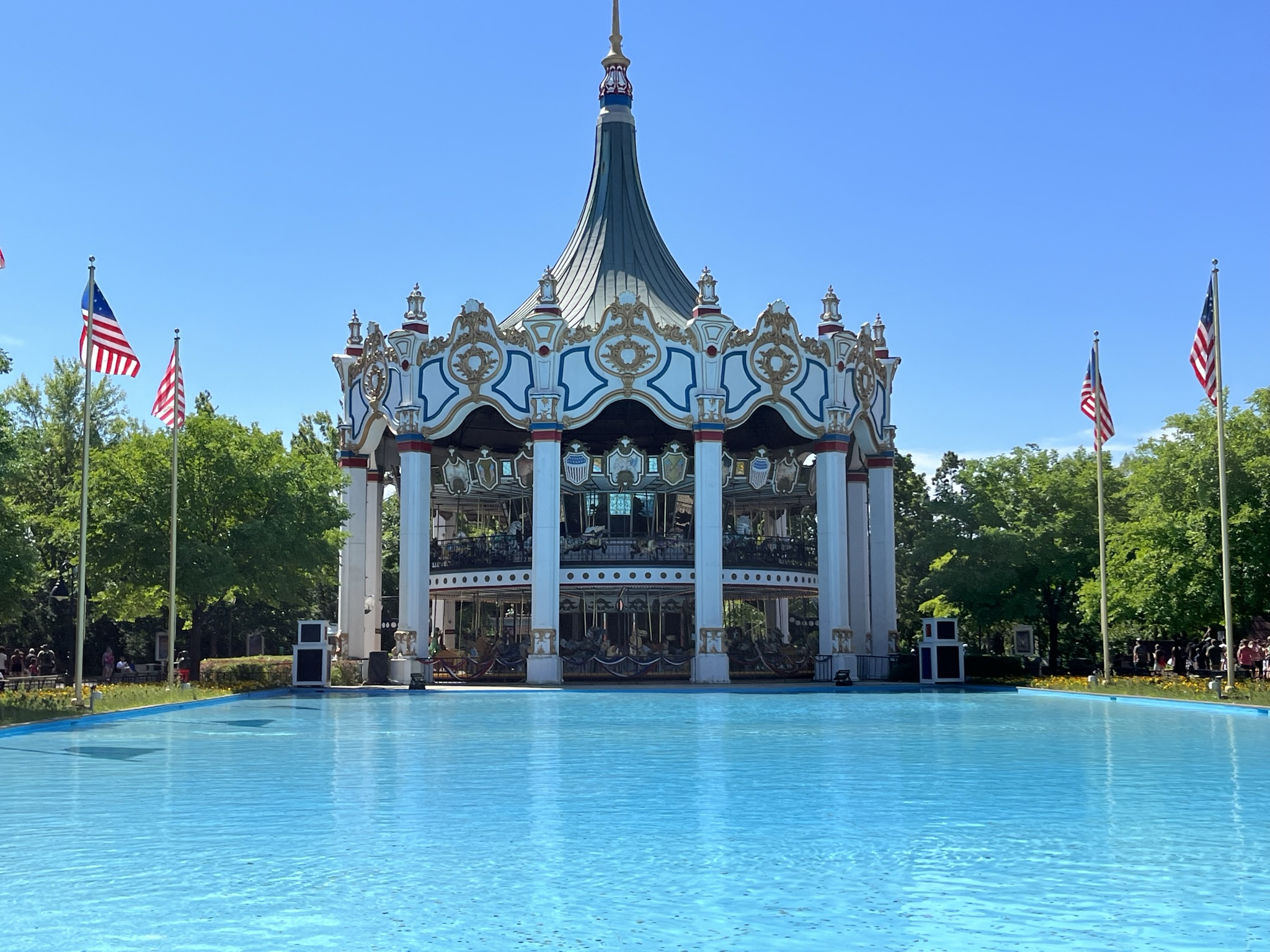
California's Great America and Six Flags Great America celebrated their 40th anniversaries in March and May, respectively.

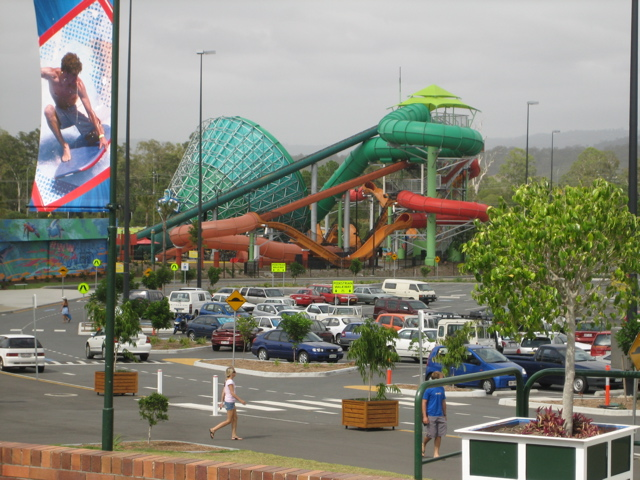
WhiteWater World celebrated its 10th anniversary in December.

- Beijing Shijingshan Amusement Park 30th birthday
- Blackpool Pleasure Beach 120th birthday
- California's Great America 40th birthday
- Canada's Wonderland 35th birthday
- Chimelong Paradise 10th birthday
- Dreamworld 35th birthday
- Disney California Adventure 15th birthday
- Downtown Disney 15th birthday
- Gilroy Gardens 15th birthday
- Happy Valley Beijing 10th anniversary
- Lagoon Amusement Park 130th birthday
- Toverland 15th birthday
- Magic Kingdom 45th birthday
- Michigan's Adventure 60th birthday
- Sea World (Australia) 45th birthday
- Six Flags Great America 40th birthday
- Six Flags Magic Mountain 45th birthday
- Six Flags Over Texas 55th birthday
- Six Flags St. Louis 45th birthday
- Valleyfair 40th birthday
- Waldameer & Water World 120th birthday
- Warner Bros Movie World 25th birthday
- WhiteWater World 10th birthday

=== Closed ===
- Dickens World – October 12
- Wet 'n Wild Orlando – December 31
- Wildwater Kingdom – September 5
- Pleasure Island Family Theme Park – October 29

== Additions ==
=== Roller coasters ===
==== New ====
Name	Park	Type	Manufacturer	Opened	Ref(s)
Ba-a-a Express	Europa Park	Family roller coaster	Mack Rides	July 13	
Cobra's Curse	Busch Gardens Tampa	Spinning roller coaster	Mack Rides	June 17	
Coaster through the Clouds	Nanchang Wanda Park	Mega Coaster	Intamin	May 28	
The Dragon	Legoland Dubai	Steel roller coaster	Zierer	November	
Dragon's Apprentice	Legoland Dubai	Junior roller coaster	Zamperla	October	
Flight of the Pterosaur	Paultons Park	Suspended Family Coaster	Vekoma	May 17	
The Flying Dinosaur	Universal Studios Japan	Flying Coaster	Bolliger & Mabillard	March 18	
Flight of the Hippogriff	Universal Studios Hollywood	Steel roller coaster	Mack Rides	April 7	
Formuła	Energylandia	Launched roller coaster	Vekoma	June 25	
Flying Aces	Ferrari World	Mega Coaster	Intamin	2016	
The Green Hornet: High Speed Chase	Motiongate Dubai	Steel roller coaster	Gerstlauer	December 16	
Jungle Trailblazer	Oriental Heritage, Fujian	Wooden roller coaster	Martin & Vleminckx	2016	
The Joker	Six Flags Great Adventure	4th Dimension roller coaster	S&S Worldwide	May 28	
Jungle Trailblazer	Fantawild Dreamland, Zhuzhou	Wooden roller coaster	Martin & Vleminckx	2016	
Kung Fu Panda Master	Gardaland	Spinning roller coaster	Fabbri Group	may 23	
Lightning Rod	Dollywood	Launched Wooden roller coaster	Rocky Mountain Construction	June 13	
Lost Gravity	Walibi Holland	Steel roller coaster	Mack Rides	March 24	
Mako	SeaWorld Orlando	Hypercoaster	Bolliger & Mabillard	June 10	
The Monster	Adventureland	Infinity Coaster	Gerstlauer	June 4	
Velociraptor	Paultons Park	Family Boomerang roller coaster	Vekoma	May 17	
Seven Dwarfs Mine Train	Shanghai Disneyland Park	Steel roller coaster	Vekoma	June 16	
Timber	Walibi Rhône-Alpes	Wooden roller coaster	Gravitykraft Corporation	April 9	
Pulsar	Walibi Belgium	Powered Splash	Mack Rides	2016	
TRON Lightcycle Power Run	Shanghai Disneyland Park	Motorbike roller coaster	Vekoma	June 16	
Valravn	Cedar Point	Dive coaster	Bolliger & Mabillard	May 7	
Python in Bamboo Forest	Nanchang Wanda Park	Wooden roller coaster	Great Coasters International	2016	
Whirlwind	Playland's Castaway Cove	Spinning roller coaster	SBF Visa Group	2016	
Soaring with Dragon	Hefei Wanda Cultural Tourism City	Launched roller coaster	Intamin	2016	
Caterpillar	Southport Pleasureland	Steel roller coaster	DAL Amusement Rides Company	2016	
Taron	Phantasialand	Launched roller coaster	Intamin	June 30	
Raik	Phantasialand	Family Boomerang roller coaster	Vekoma	June 30	
Predator	IMG Worlds of Adventure	Euro-Fighter roller coaster	Gerstlauer	August 31	
Spider-Man Doc Ock's Revenge	IMG Worlds of Adventure	Spinning roller coaster	Mack Rides	August 31	
Velociraptor	IMG Worlds of Adventure	Launched roller coaster	Mack Rides	August 31	
Wildfire	Kolmården Wildlife Park	Wooden roller coaster	Rocky Mountain Construction	June 28	
Phobia Phear Coaster	Lake Compounce	Launched roller coaster	Premier Rides	May 7	

==== Relocated ====
Name	Park	Type	Manufacturer	Opened	Formerly	Ref(s)
Galaxy 500	Hydro Adventures	Steel roller coaster	S.D.C.	July 7	1970 Galaxy Rip Tide Coaster at Miracle Strip at Pier Park	
Rampage	Big Sheep	Steel roller coaster	Zierer	2016	New Roller Coaster at New MetroLand	
Recoil	Wonderla, Hyderabad	Boomerang roller coaster	Vekoma	2016	Zoomerang at Alabama Splash Adventure	
Recoil	Wonderla, Bangalore	Boomerang roller coaster	Vekoma	2016	Thunderbolt at Aladdin's Kingdom	

==== Refurbished ====
Name	Park	Type	Manufacturer	Opened	Formerly	Ref(s)
The Joker	Six Flags Discovery Kingdom	Steel roller coaster	Rocky Mountain Construction	May 30	Roar	
The New Revolution	Six Flags Magic Mountain	Steel roller coaster	Anton Schwarzkopf	March 26	Revolution	
Storm Chaser	Kentucky Kingdom	Steel roller coaster	Rocky Mountain Construction	April 30	Twisted Twins	
Superman: The Ride	Six Flags New England	Steel roller coaster	Intamin	2016	Bizarro	
Galactica	Alton Towers	VR Flying roller coaster	Bolliger & Mabillard	March 24	Air	
GhostRider	Knott's Berry Farm	Wooden roller coaster	Great Coasters International	June 11	—N/a	
The Incredible Hulk	Universal's Islands of Adventure	Launched roller coaster	Bolliger & Mabillard	August 4	—N/a	
Blue Hawk	Six Flags Over Georgia	Steel roller coaster	Vekoma	June 9	Ninja	
The Joker Funhouse Coaster	Six Flags Over Georgia	Junior roller coaster	Chance Rides	2016	Wile E. Coyote Canyon Blaster	
Flashback	Great Escape	Boomerang roller coaster	Vekoma	2016	Boomerang: Coast to Coaster	

=== Other attractions ===
==== New ====
Name	Park	Type	Opened	Ref(s)
Bugs Bunny BoomTown	Six Flags Over Georgia	Themed land	2016	
DC Super Friends	Six Flags Over Georgia	Themed land	2016	
Fireball	Six Flags Fiesta Texas; Six Flags New England; Six Flags St. Louis	Giant Loop	2016	
Flying Eagles	Canada's Wonderland	Flying Scooters	May 1	
Frozen Ever After	Epcot	Boat voyage	June 21	
Frozen – Live at the Hyperion	Disney California Adventure	Musical show	May 27	
Ghostbusters: Battle for New York	Motiongate Dubai	Interactive dark ride	December	
Kidz Zone	Waldameer & Water World	ProSlide Technology children's water slides and playground	July 23	
The Haunted Hotel	IMG Worlds of Adventure	Haunted attraction	August 31	
Hotel Transylvania	Motiongate Dubai	Dark ride	December	
Iron Man Experience	Hong Kong Disneyland	3D Motion simulator	2016	
Greezed Lightnin'	Great Escape	Giant Loop	2016	
Plants Vs. Zombies Garden Warfare	Carowinds	3D interactive game	March 2016	
Carolina Harbor	Carowinds	Water Park	March 2016	
Black Beards Revenge	Carowinds	Multi slide complex	March 2016	
Surf Club Harbor	Carowinds	Wave pool	March 2016	
Kitty Hawk Cove	Carowinds	Children's play area	March 2016	
Myrtle Turtle Beach	Carowinds	Children's play area	March 2016	
Sea Side Splash Works	Carowinds	Multi Level Play Structure	March 2016	
Harry Potter and the Forbidden Journey	Universal Studios Hollywood	3D Dark ride	April 7	
Hurricane Force 5	Six Flags Fiesta Texas	Disk'O	2016	
Justice League: Battle for Metropolis	Six Flags Great America; Six Flags Mexico	3D Interactive Dark Ride	March 4	
Buzz Lightyear Planet Rescue	Shanghai Disneyland	Dark ride	June 16	
Dumbo the Flying Elephant	Shanghai Disneyland	Aerial Carousel	June 16	
Explorer Canoes	Shanghai Disneyland	Canoes	June 16	
Fantasia Carousel	Shanghai Disneyland	Carousel	June 16	
Hunny Pot Spin	Shanghai Disneyland	Tea Cups Ride	June 16	
Jet Packs	Shanghai Disneyland	Aerial Carousel	June 16	
Peter Pan's Flight	Shanghai Disneyland	Dark ride	June 16	
Pirates of the Caribbean: Battle for the Sunken Treasure	Shanghai Disneyland	Aquatic Dark ride	June 16	
Roaring Rapids	Shanghai Disneyland	Rapids ride	June 16	
Soaring Over the Horizon	Shanghai Disneyland	Motion Simulator	June 16	
The Many Adventures of Winnie the Pooh	Shanghai Disneyland	Dark ride	June 16	
Voyage to the Crystal Grotto	Shanghai Disneyland	Boat ride	June 16	
The Riddler Revenge Catwoman's Whip Harley Quinn's Spinsanity	Six Flags Over Texas	Giant Discovery ride Endeavor Troika	2016	
Smurfs Studio Tours	Motiongate Dubai	Dark ride	December	
Underworld 4D	Motiongate Dubai	4-D attraction	December	
The Wizarding World of Harry Potter	Universal Studios Hollywood	Themed land	April 7	
Zombieland: Blast Off!	Motiongate Dubai	Drop tower	December	
Derren Brown's Ghost Train	Thorpe Park	3D Dark ride	2016	
Skyhawk	Canada's Wonderland	Sky-Roller	May 1	
Skull Island: Reign of Kong	Universal's Islands of Adventure	3D Dark ride	2016	
Hulk Epsilon Base 3D	IMG Worlds of Adventure	3D Show	August 31	
Thor Thunder Spin	IMG Worlds of Adventure	Top Spin	August 31	
Avengers Flight of the Quinjets	IMG Worlds of Adventure	Aerial Carousel	August 31	
Avengers Battle of Ultron	IMG Worlds of Adventure	Motion simulator	August 31	
Forbidden Territory	IMG Worlds of Adventure	Dark ride	August 31	
Dino Carousel	IMG Worlds of Adventure	Carousel	August 31	
Adventure Fortress	IMG Worlds of Adventure	Indoor Playground	August 31	
The Powerpuff Girls – Mojo Jojo’s Robot Rampage!	IMG Worlds of Adventure	Air Race	August 31	
Ben 10 5D Hero Time	IMG Worlds of Adventure	5D Show	August 31	
Adventure Time - The Ride of OOO with Finn & Jake	IMG Worlds of Adventure	Suspended monorail	August 31	
The Amazing Ride of Gumball	IMG Worlds of Adventure	Interactive dark ride	August 31	
LazyTown	IMG Worlds of Adventure	Themed land	August 31	
Tropical Plunge	Soak City at Kings Island	Multi-slide complex	Unknown	
Splashwater Falls	Six Flags America	Multi-slide complex	Unknown	

==== Refurbished ====
Name	Park	Type	Opened	Formerly	Ref(s)
Luigi's Rollickin' Roadsters	Disney California Adventure	Trackless ride	March 7	Luigi's Flying Tires	
Mr. Ping’s Noodle surprise	Gardaland	Tea Cups	May 23	Kaffetasen	
Soarin' Around the World	Epcot	Motion Simulator	2016	Soarin'	
Soarin' Around the World	Disney California Adventure	Motion Simulator	2016	Soarin' Over California	
Dinosaur	Disney's Animal Kingdom	EMV dark ride	November 22	—N/a	

== Closed attractions & roller coasters ==
Name	Park	Type	Closed	Ref(s)
Animagique	Walt Disney Studios Park	Live show	January 31	
Autopia	Hong Kong Disneyland	Car ride	June 11	←
Boomerang	Pleasure Island Family Theme Park	Vekoma Boomerang Roller Coaster	October 29	
Back to the Future: The Ride	Universal Studios Japan	Motion simulator	May 31	
Beetlejuice's Rock and Roll Graveyard Revue	Universal Studios Florida	Live show	January 5	
Big Thunder Ranch	Disneyland	Exhibit	January 11	
Crazy Cobra	Discoveryland, Dalian	Launched roller coaster	October 31	
Disney's Aladdin: A Musical Spectacular	Disney California Adventure	Live show	January 10	
Disney Drawing Class	Tokyo Disneyland	Exhibit	September 30	
Earffel Tower	Disney's Hollywood Studios	Water tower	April 29	
Europe in the Air	Busch Gardens Williamsburg	Simulator ride	August	
Firefall	California's Great America	Top Spin	October 30	
Flying Falcon	Hersheypark	Huss Condor	September 5	
Habit Heroes	Epcot	Exhibit	January 17	
Honey, I Shrunk the Kids: Movie Set Adventure	Disney's Hollywood Studios	Playground	April 2	
Kanonen	Liseberg	Launched roller coaster	December 30	
Lights, Motors, Action! Extreme Stunt Show	Disney's Hollywood Studios	Live show	April 2	
Mean Streak	Cedar Point	Wooden Roller Coaster	September 16	
Splashwater Falls	Six Flags New England	Spinning Rapids	September 5	
Star Tours	Disneyland Paris	Motion simulator	March 17	
Southern sidewinder	Carowinds	Water slide	October	
Stitch Encounter	Hong Kong Disneyland	Live show	May 2	
StormRider	Tokyo DisneySea	Simulator ride	May 16	
Tanganyika Tidal Wave	Busch Gardens Tampa	Shoot-the-Chutes	April 10	
The Jester's Wild Ride	Six Flags Great America	Zamperla Rockin' Tug	August 7	
The Orbit	Six Flags Great America	Enterprise	August 7	
The Osborne Family Spectacle of Dancing Lights	Disney's Hollywood Studios	Exhibit	January 6	
Thunder Loop	Attractiepark Slagharen	Steel roller coaster	October 2	
Thunder River Rapids	Dreamworld	River rapids ride	October 25	
Vortex	California's Great America	Bolliger & Mabillard Stand-up Coaster	September 5	
Wet 'n Wild Orlando	Universal Orlando Resort	Water park	December 31	
White water falls	Carowinds	Shoot the Chute	October	
Wildwater Kingdom	Cedar Fair	Water park	September 5	
Zombie Evilution	Dreamworld	laser tag / scare maze	January 27	

== Themed Accommodation ==
=== New ===
Name	Park	Theme	Opening	Ref(s)
Gardaland Adventure Hotel	Gardaland	Various	June 1	
Lapita Hotel	Dubai Parks and Resorts	Polynesian	October 31	
Loews Sapphire Falls Resort	Universal Orlando Resort	Caribbean	2016	
Shanghai Disneyland Hotel	Shanghai Disneyland	Art Nouveau	June 16	
Toy Story Hotel	Shanghai Disneyland	Toy Story	June 16	
Explorer Glamping	Chessington World of Adventures	Campsite	May 27	
