= CommuniCore =

Former pavilion at Epcot's Future World

EPCOT Center
- Area: Future World
- Coordinates: 28°22′27.44″N 81°32′59.51″W
- Status: Removed
- Opening date: October 1, 1982
- Closing date: January 30, 1994
- Replaced by: Innoventions

Ride statistics
- Attraction type: Pavilion
- Designer: WED Enterprises
- Theme: Science and Technology
- Music: "The Computer Song" written by the Sherman Brothers (music & lyrics)
- Wheelchair accessible

CommuniCore was a pavilion dedicated to technological advance located at EPCOT Center in Walt Disney World, Florida. It occupied two semi-circular buildings behind Spaceship Earth at the center of Future World (today World Celebration). The two buildings were known as CommuniCore East and West and housed rotating exhibits. The pavilion was closed and redesigned in 1994, and the former CommuniCore buildings became the home of Innoventions, which closed permanently on September 7, 2019.

== Description ==
CommuniCore was the hub of EPCOT Center, both geographically and conceptually, as it brought together nearly all of the ideas and concepts explored in Future World and complemented the experiences offered by other pavilions. For example, the Energy Exchange was located in a sector of CommuniCore adjacent to the Universe of Energy, giving curious guests the opportunity to explore the concept of energy more comprehensively after exiting the pavilion.

Having debuted at the dawn of the modern computer era, the emphasis throughout CommuniCore was primarily on educating the public about computers. The feature exhibit was a tour through EPCOT Computer Central, the computer hub of EPCOT Center that ran nearly everything throughout the park. The original version was named the Astuter Computer Revue (featuring a song by the Sherman Brothers titled "The Computer Song"). It had the distinction of being the shortest-lived attraction at the park, lasting for under two years from the opening of CommuniCore in October 1982 to January 1984. The tour was updated and re-opened as Backstage Magic.

In the southern quadrant of CommuniCore East one could shop at the Centorium, the largest merchandise location in EPCOT Center. The Stargate Restaurant in the northern quadrant of CommuniCore East and the Sunrise Terrace in the southern quadrant of CommuniCore West were open for breakfast, lunch and dinner.

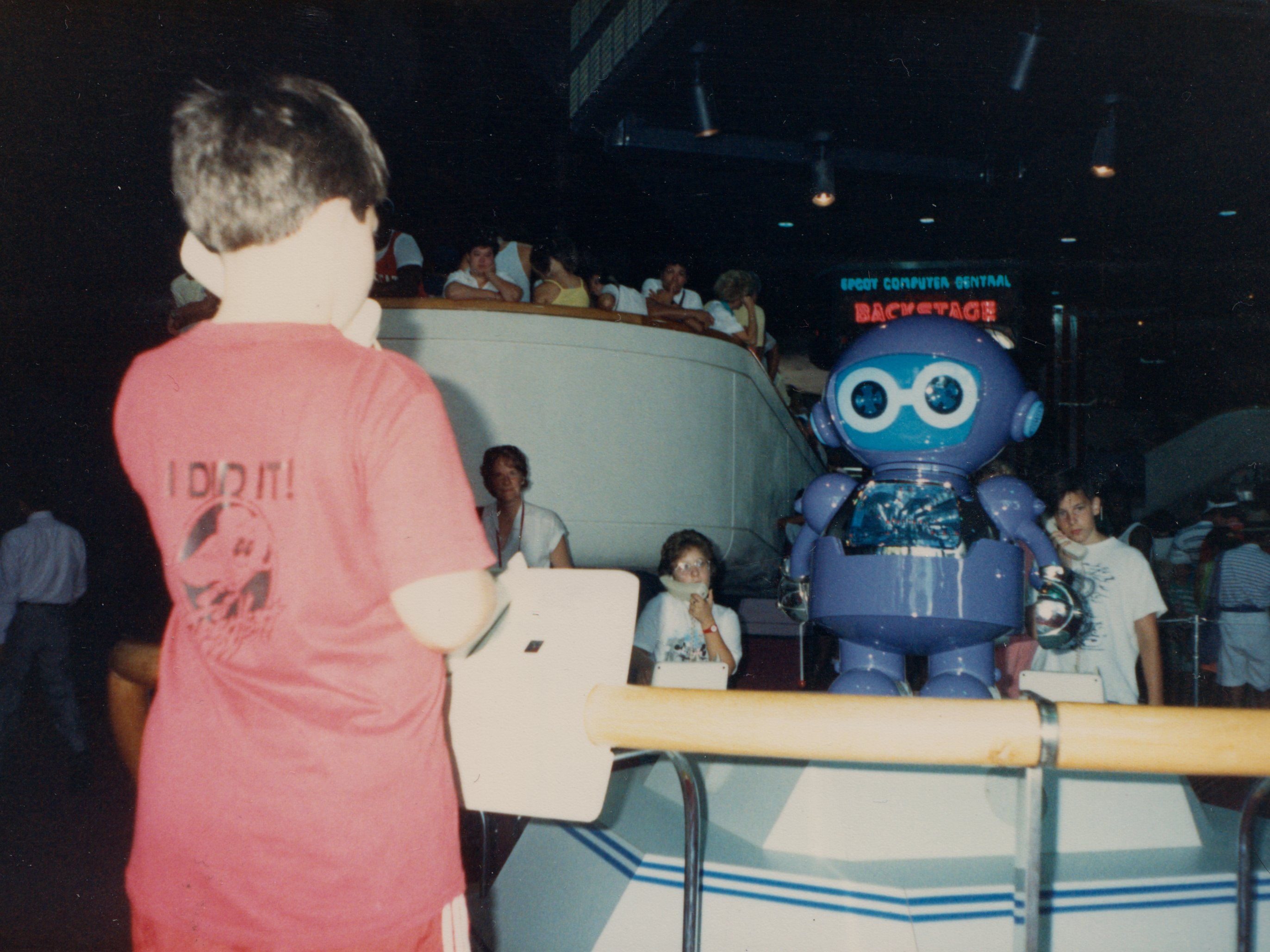
A child speaks to the SMRT-1 robot

Other exhibits inside CommuniCore East included Compute-A-Coaster, the Great American Census Quiz, Get Set Jet and the Flag Games, all featuring brand new touch-screen technology. Also featured were the TravelPort, and the Electronic Forum, where one could take the EPCOT Poll, an interactive census on popular issues. One could also take a look at the Population Clock, a device that displayed the rough population of the United States and changed accordingly with every passing second. CommuniCore East was also the residence of SMRT-1, a friendly robot who used the latest in voice recognition technology to interact with Guests. At CommuniCore West was FutureCom, an exhibit sponsored by AT&T that forecast the advent of things like electronic commerce, Expo Robotics, and an educational resource center called, at various times, EPCOT Outreach, Ask Epcot, and the Epcot Discovery Center.

Planned exhibits incorporated into the design of the buildings included a second floor, intended to house a PeopleMover system which would allow riders to preview the features and attractions within CommuniCore. The buildings were also designed so that they could easily be expanded outwards, facilitating easy additions to expand the exhibit capacity of the attraction as a whole.

== Closure ==
In an effort to keep EPCOT updated and vital, CommuniCore was closed in January 1994 to be redesigned into Innoventions, a more eclectic, wild, and corporate-driven take on a Science and Technology pavilion. The Stargate Restaurant became the Electric Umbrella, and the Sunrise Terrace was divided into the Pasta Piazza Ristorante and Fountain View Espresso and Bakery. In 2001, Pasta Piazza closed; the space sat vacant until 2006, when it was converted into the Epcot Character Connection (then later Epcot Character Spot). The Expo Robotics area became The Walt Disney Imagineering Labs (closed in October 1997). In June 1998, part of the former "lab" space became Ice Station Cool, which was redecorated and renamed Club Cool, a small Coca-Cola sponsored exhibit where one can try Coca-Cola products from around the world. In 1999, Centorium expanded and became MouseGear.

Even with the closure of CommuniCore, a few elements of the old attraction still remained untouched, with some remaining until Innoventions's closure in September 2019. For example, Innoventions West had a large section of the building unchanged from its CommuniCore days up until 2007. In the glass-walled hallway behind Pasta Piazza, the original large circular ceiling light fixtures, and the original carpet patterned by the CommuniCore logo were in the shape of the two buildings it housed. However, in May 2007 the carpeting and light fixtures were changed. Additionally, the original EXIT signs could be seen scattered throughout Innoventions.

SMRT-1, the robot that interacted with guests in CommuniCore East, was displayed in the Concourse Steakhouse at the Contemporary Resort near the Magic Kingdom until it was later sold after SMRT-1 suffered an accidental fall at the Steakhouse that caused minor damage.

In 2009, one of the attractions, Compute-A-Coaster, was resurrected conceptually with The Sum of All Thrills, which allowed guests to design their own roller coaster and then ride a simulation of their design in a KUKA arm-operated vehicle. It closed on September 14, 2016.

With the 2019 closure of Innoventions, there was a drastic re-imagining of Epcot's "Community Core", and only the East building survives. However, with the COVID-19 pandemic resulting in changes to the plans for West, a quadrant was rebuilt under the name CommuniCore Hall, the exhibition space and CommuniCore Plaza, the festival stage. These structures opened in June 2024.

== See also ==
- Epcot attraction and entertainment history
