= The Riddler Revenge =

Amusement ride at Six Flags Over Texas

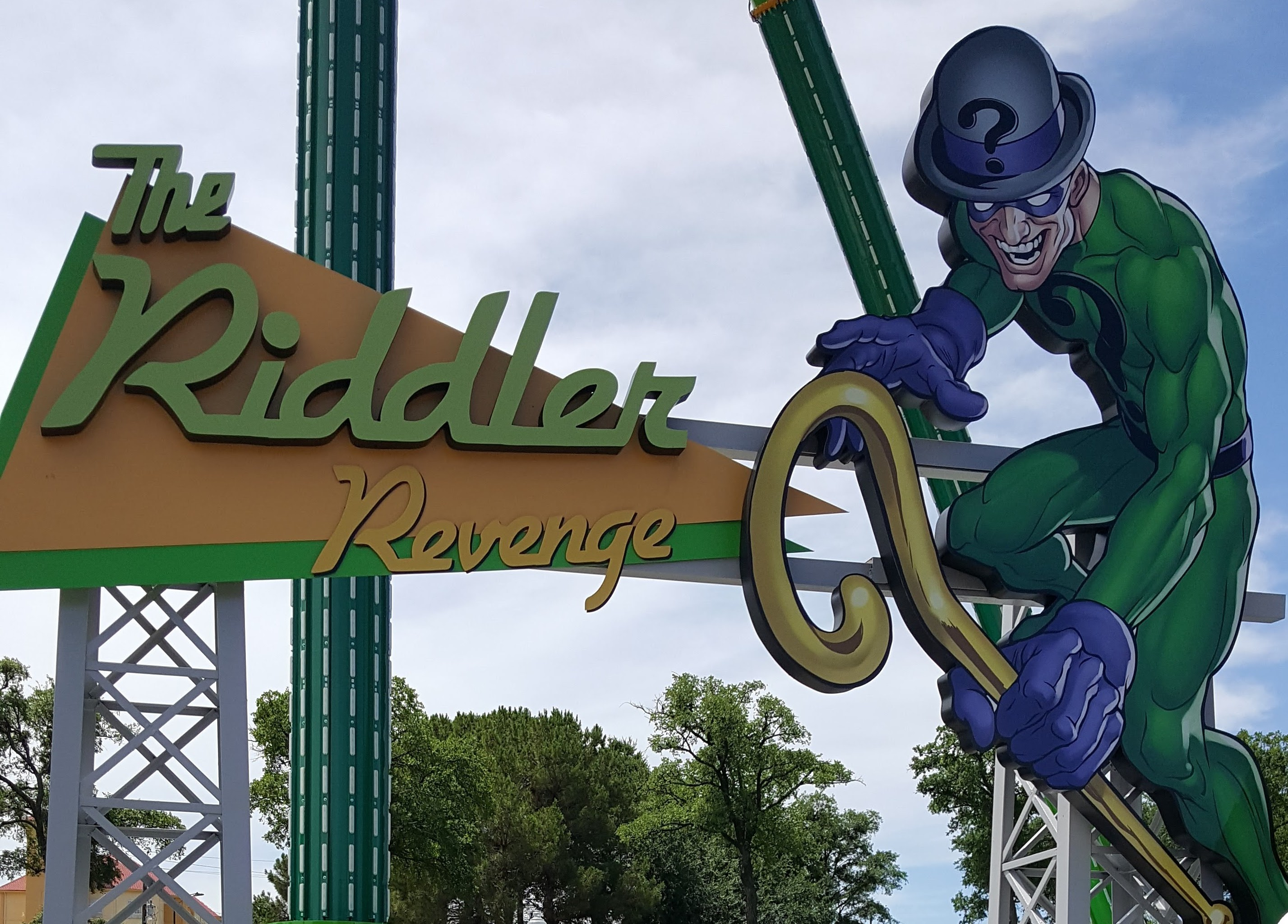

Six Flags Over Texas
- Area: Gotham City
- Coordinates: 32°45′20.52″N 97°4′12.80″W
- Status: Operating
- Opening date: May 28, 2016

Ride statistics
- Manufacturer: Zamperla
- Model: Giant Discovery
- Height: 146 ft (45 m)
- Speed: 70 mph (110 km/h)
- Participants per group: 40
- Height restriction: 52 in (132 cm)
- Fast Lane available

The Riddler Revenge is a Zamperla Giant Discovery Frisbee ride that pendulums riders at Six Flags Over Texas. It opened on May 28, 2016.

== History ==
On September 3, 2015, Six Flags Over Texas announced that they would be adding three new flat rides to the Gotham City section. One of these rides would be the Riddler Revenge. The Riddler Revenge would be a Zamperla Giant Discovery, very similar to Black Widow at Kennywood.

The Riddler Revenge would open to guests in 2016.

== Ride ==
The giant circle swings in a pendulum motion while switching between clockwise and counterclockwise rotations. At the peak of the swing, riders reach a height of 146 feet (45 m) above the ground and experience weightlessness. The Riddler Revenge stands at 90 feet (27 m) tall but reaches a height of 146 feet (45 m) in full swing with an angle of 120 degrees from the center. However, due to multiple problems with motors burning out often, the Park has decreased the maximum height of the swing to only about 90 degrees from center. The pendulum motion used to propel riders back and forth at 70 miles per hour (110 km/h). Now the maximum speed is decreased due to it no longer swinging to 120 degrees.

== See also ==
- 2016 in amusement parks
