= Journey of Water =

Attraction at Epcot

- Pavilion logo Attraction wordmark

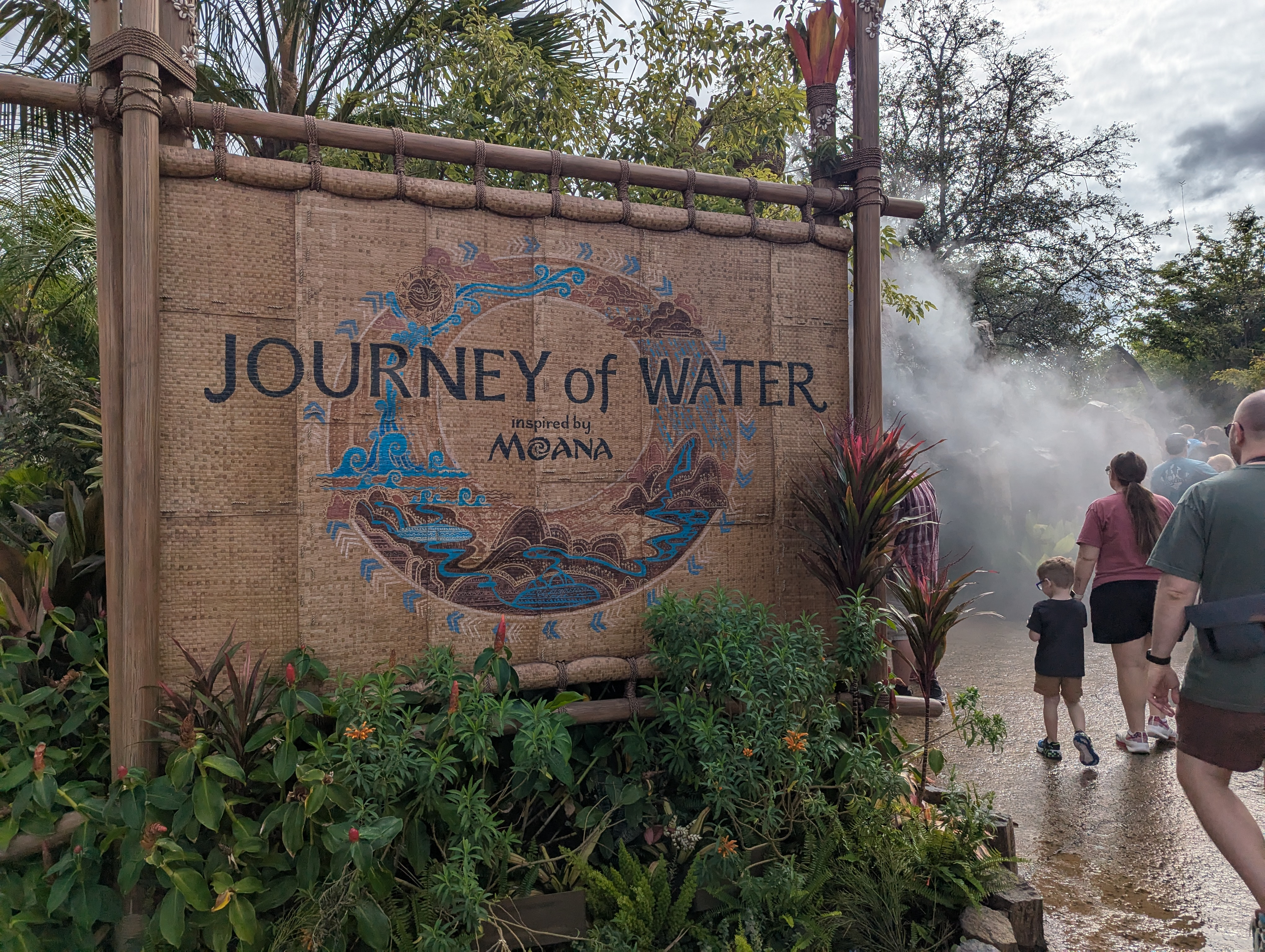
- Attraction entrance

Epcot
- Area: World Nature
- Status: Operating
- Soft opening date: July 25, 2023
- Opening date: October 16, 2023
- Replaced: Innoventions (Future World)

Ride statistics
- Attraction type: Interactive water garden
- Designer: Walt Disney Imagineering
- Theme: Moana
- Music: Lin-Manuel Miranda (music and lyrics), Opetaia Foa'i (music and lyrics), Mark Mancina (music and lyrics) & Mark Mancina (score)
- Wheelchair accessible
- Assistive listening available

Journey of Water, Inspired by Moana is a walkthrough water trail attraction at Epcot, a theme park at Walt Disney World in Bay Lake, Florida. The attraction depicts the Earth's water cycle and is inspired by the 2016 animated film Moana.

It was originally set to open in 2021 as a part of Walt Disney World's 50th Anniversary celebration. However, the attraction was delayed to October 16, 2023, as part of The Walt Disney Company's centennial celebration, due to the COVID-19 pandemic. Since then, it was announced that a new outdoor meet-and-greets location called Character Greeting, located next to the attraction, would open on the same date, which became part of Journey of Water Pavilion.

== Summary ==
Journey of Water is a walkthrough garden featuring interactive fountains and other water features leading from CommuniCore Hall (replacing much of Innoventions West) down to The Seas Pavilion. Anchored by a massive topiary of Te Fiti and rock formations of HeiHei, Pua and Moana, Journey of Water serves as a whimsical exploration of the water cycle (which was divided into seven segments of a linear 'story': rain, stream, wetland, land, lake, river, ocean, and sky) and how it sustains life on Earth.

The walkthrough attraction had two sets of previews, from July 25 to August 19, 2023, and from September 1 to 22, exclusively for Walt Disney World cast members. The attraction had DVC and annual passholder previews on September 24 to 29 and October 1 to 4, before it officially opened on October 16, 2023.

== Gallery ==
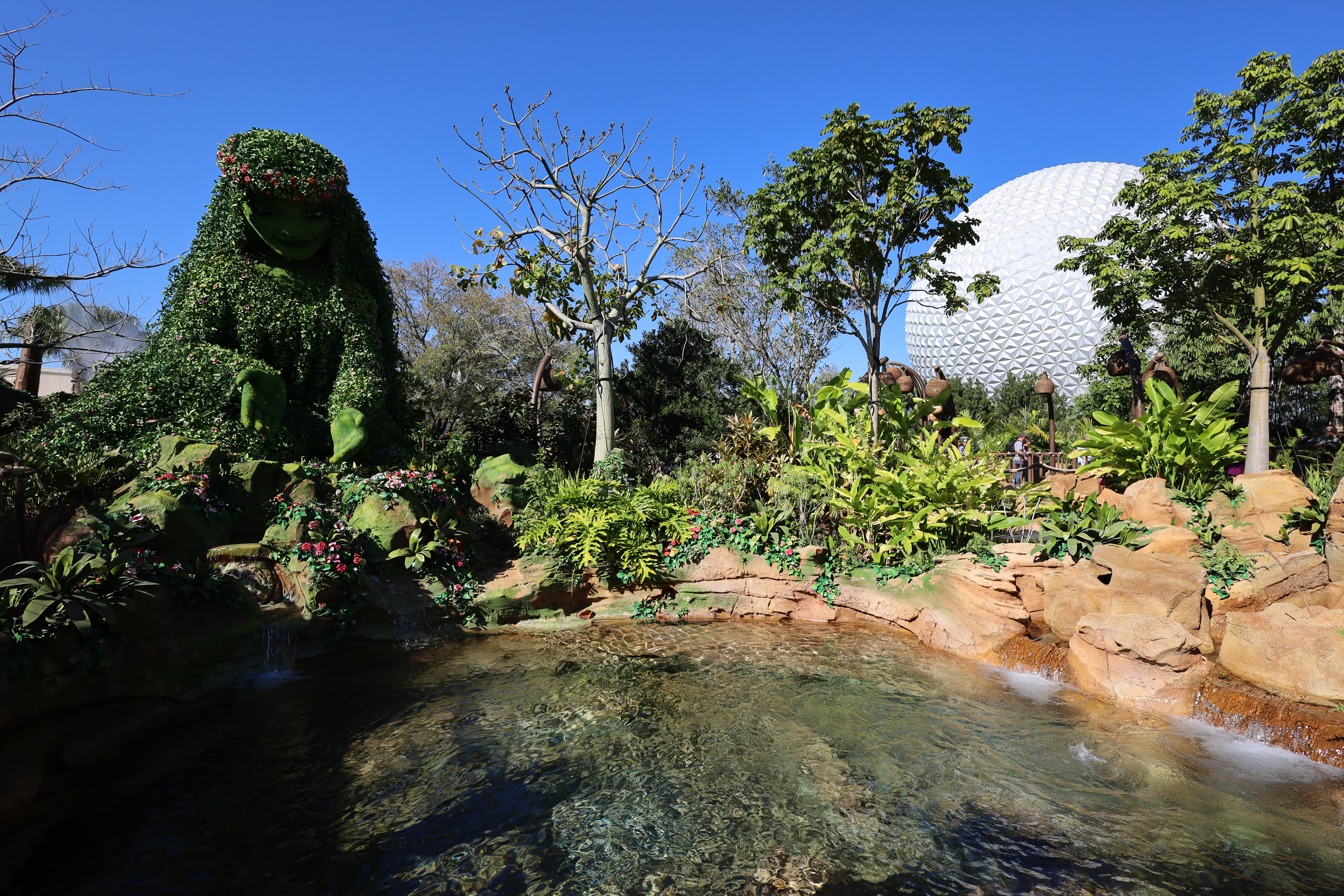

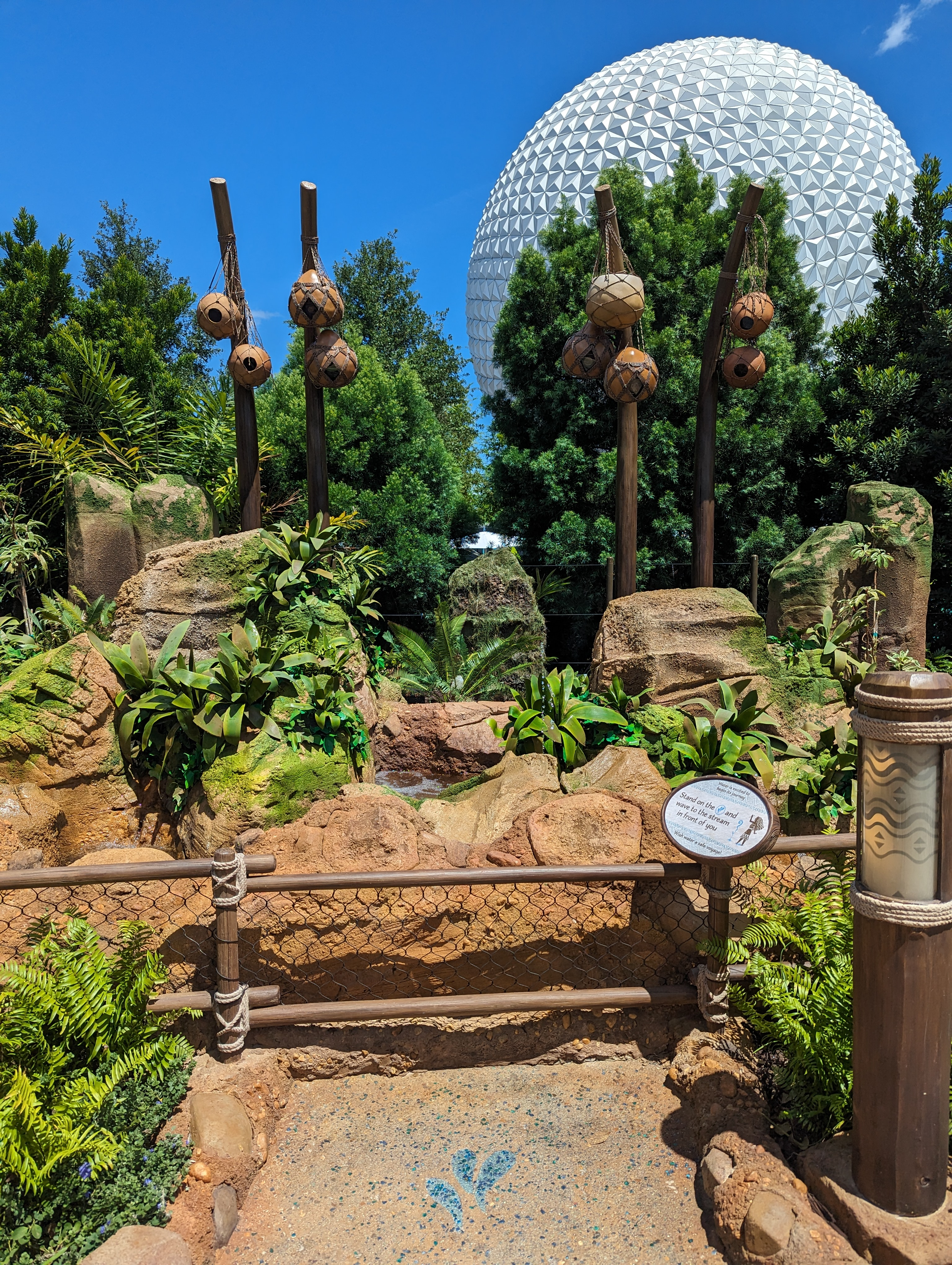

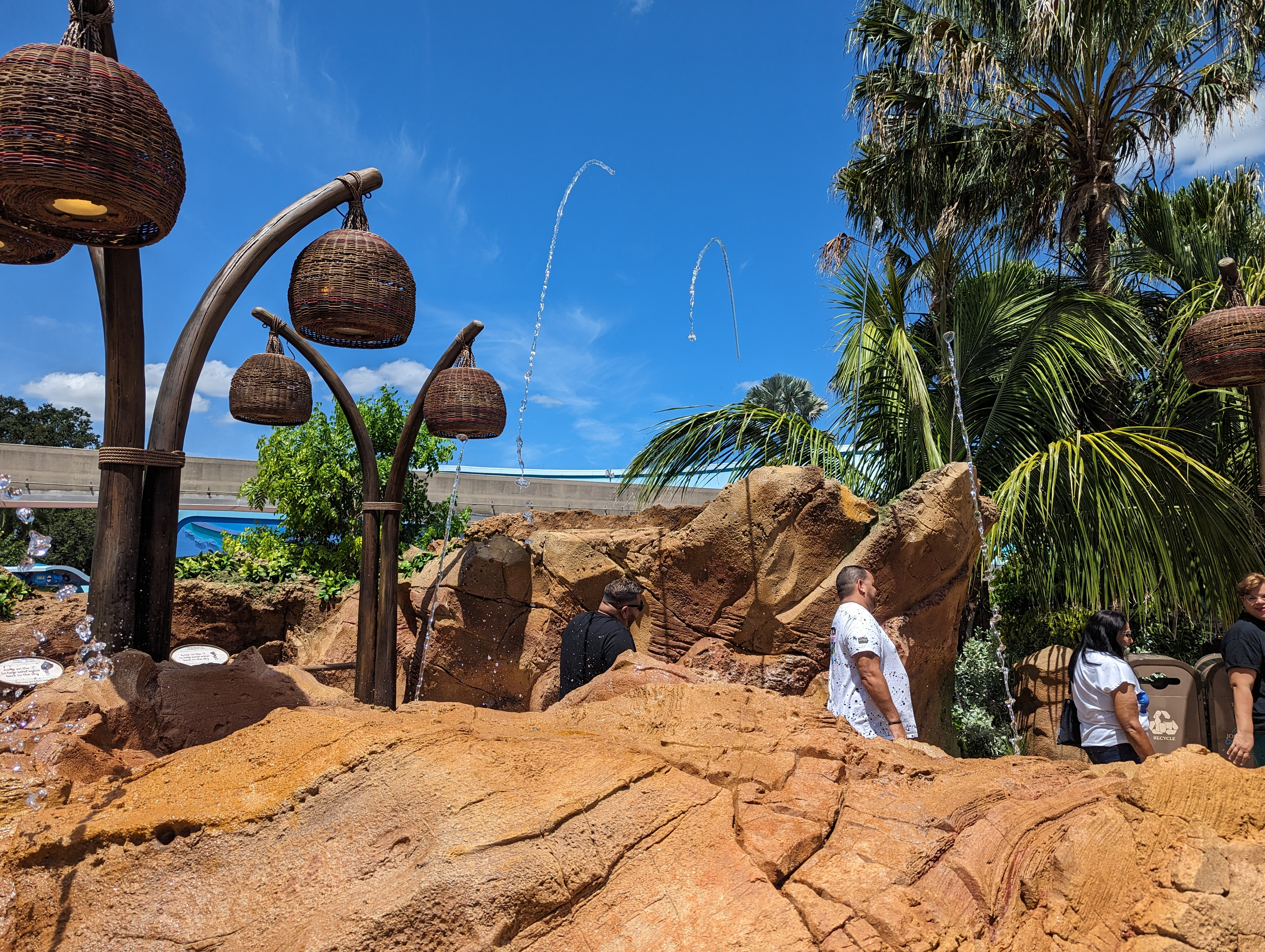

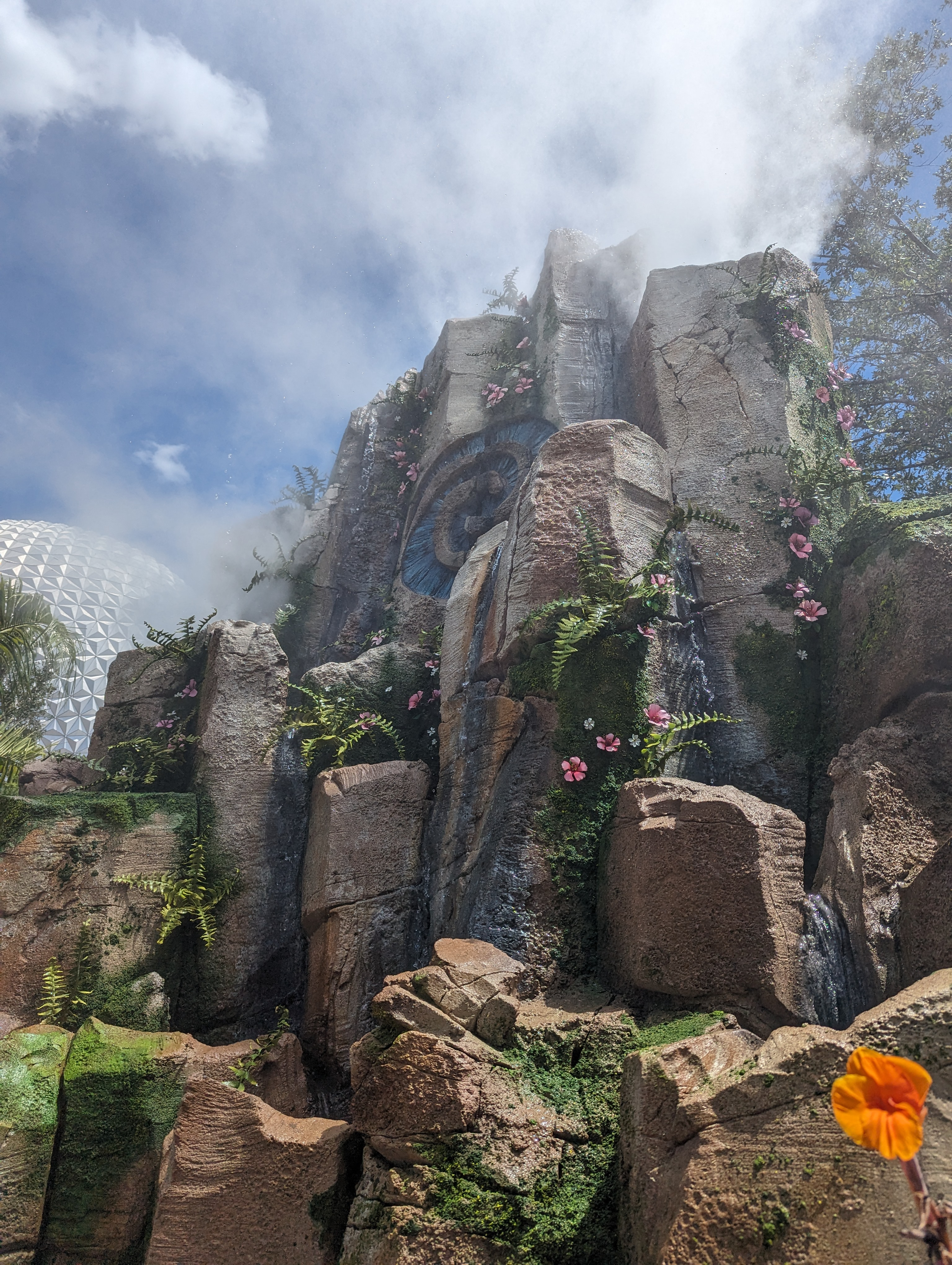
