= Innoventions (Epcot) =

Defunct exhibit collection

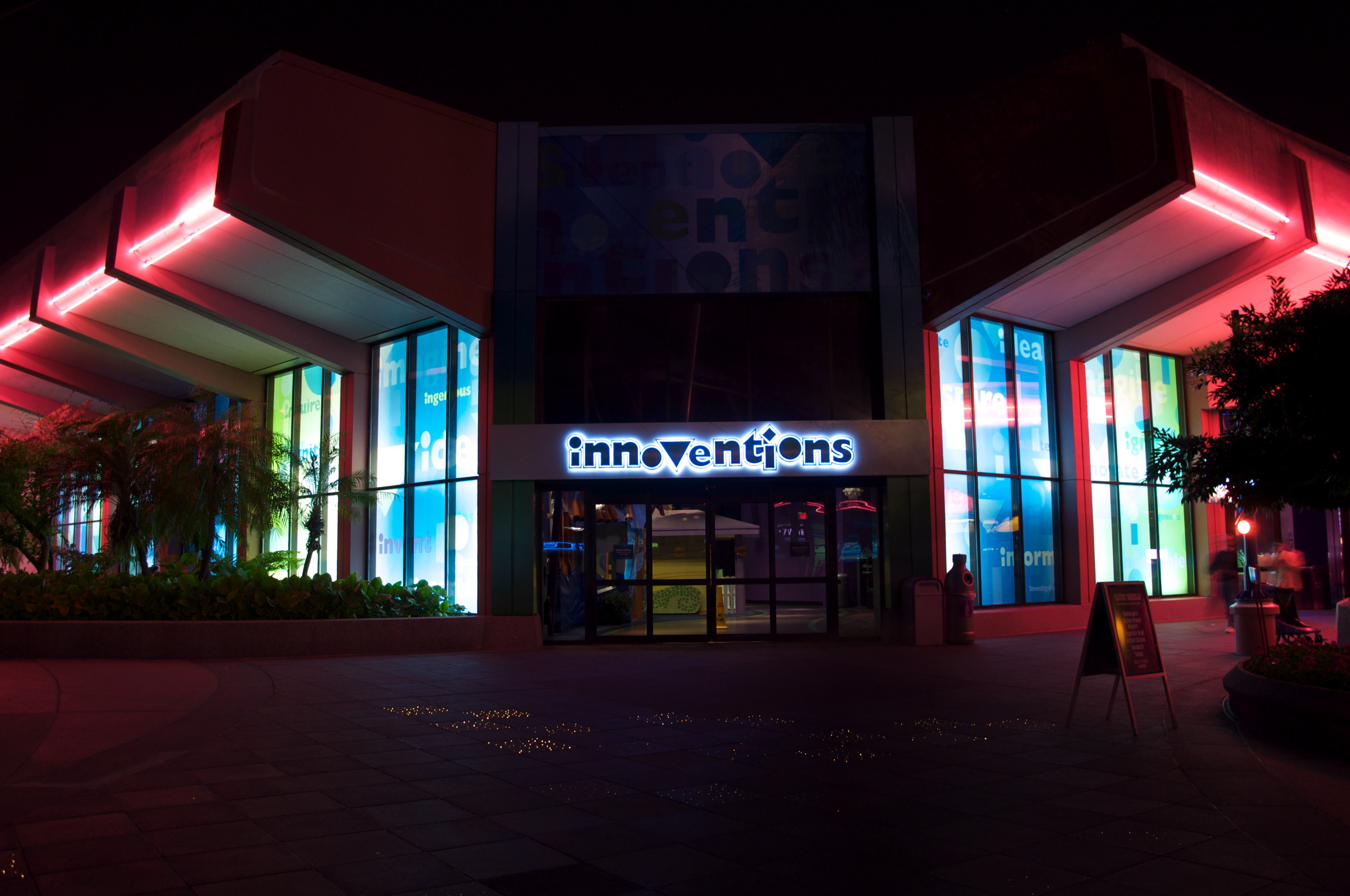

East
- Name: Innoventions East
- Area: Future World
- Coordinates: 28°22′27.44″N 81°32′59.51″W
- Status: Removed
- Opening date: July 1, 1994
- Closing date: September 7, 2019
- Replaced: CommuniCore
- Replaced by: Connections Eatery (World Celebration)

West
- Name: Innoventions West
- Area: Future World
- Status: Removed
- Opening date: July 1, 1994
- Closing date: May 19, 2015
- Replaced: CommuniCore
- Replaced by: Journey of Water (World Nature)

Ride statistics
- Attraction type: Exhibit
- Designer: Walt Disney Imagineering
- Model: Trade expo
- Theme: Technological innovation and change
- Host: Tom Morrow 2.0 (2000–2007)
- Wheelchair accessible
- Assistive listening available
- Closed captioning available

Innoventions was an ever-changing collection of exhibits at the EPCOT theme park in Walt Disney World, Florida. It focused on technological advancements and their practical applications in everyday life. Innoventions is a portmanteau of the words "innovation" and "invention".

== History ==
Innoventions first opened on July 1, 1994, replacing Communicore in EPCOT. When the attraction opened, it prominently displayed games from various Sega consoles in an arcade style. The exhibit also featured virtual reality systems that used head-mounted displays. Innoventions is divided into two buildings known as Innoventions East and Innoventions West. In 1999, Innoventions had a major renovation for the park's Millennium Celebration, and added the subtitle "The Road to Tomorrow". In 2007–2008, Innoventions underwent another major renovation, dropped the subtitle "Road to Tomorrow," and changed its general aesthetic again while also launching the companion website innoventions.disney.com.

=== Closure and demolition ===
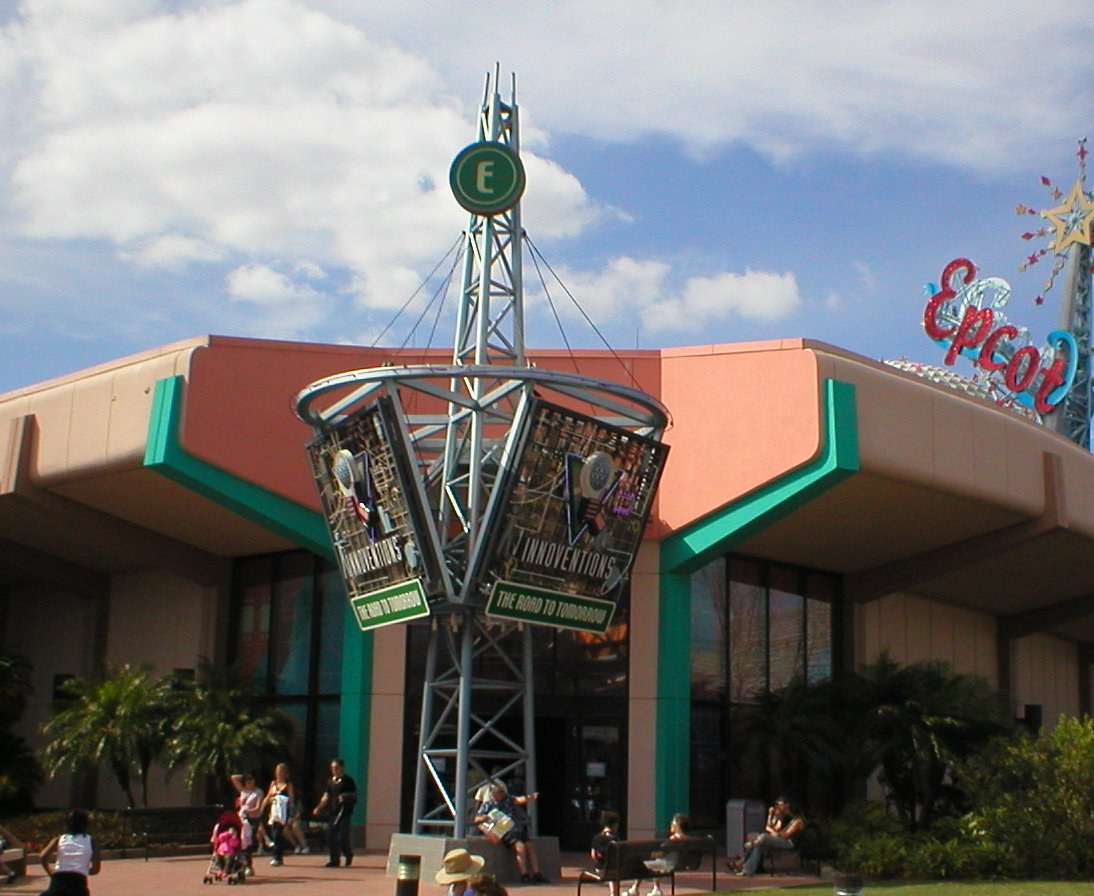
An entrance to the Innoventions pavilion, as it appeared in February 2005. Since this photo was taken, the sign tower in front of the building has been removed, as well as the Mickey wand on Spaceship Earth in the upper right.

On May 19, 2015, Innoventions West closed with the promise of a major overhaul, which ultimately never happened.

On September 7, 2019, the original version of Club Cool (Coca-Cola) and the Fountain View (Starbucks) in the south portion of Innoventions West permanently closed ahead of demolition.

Demolition of Innoventions West began in Fall 2019. The Southwest Quadrant was reduced to a structural frame in December 2019.

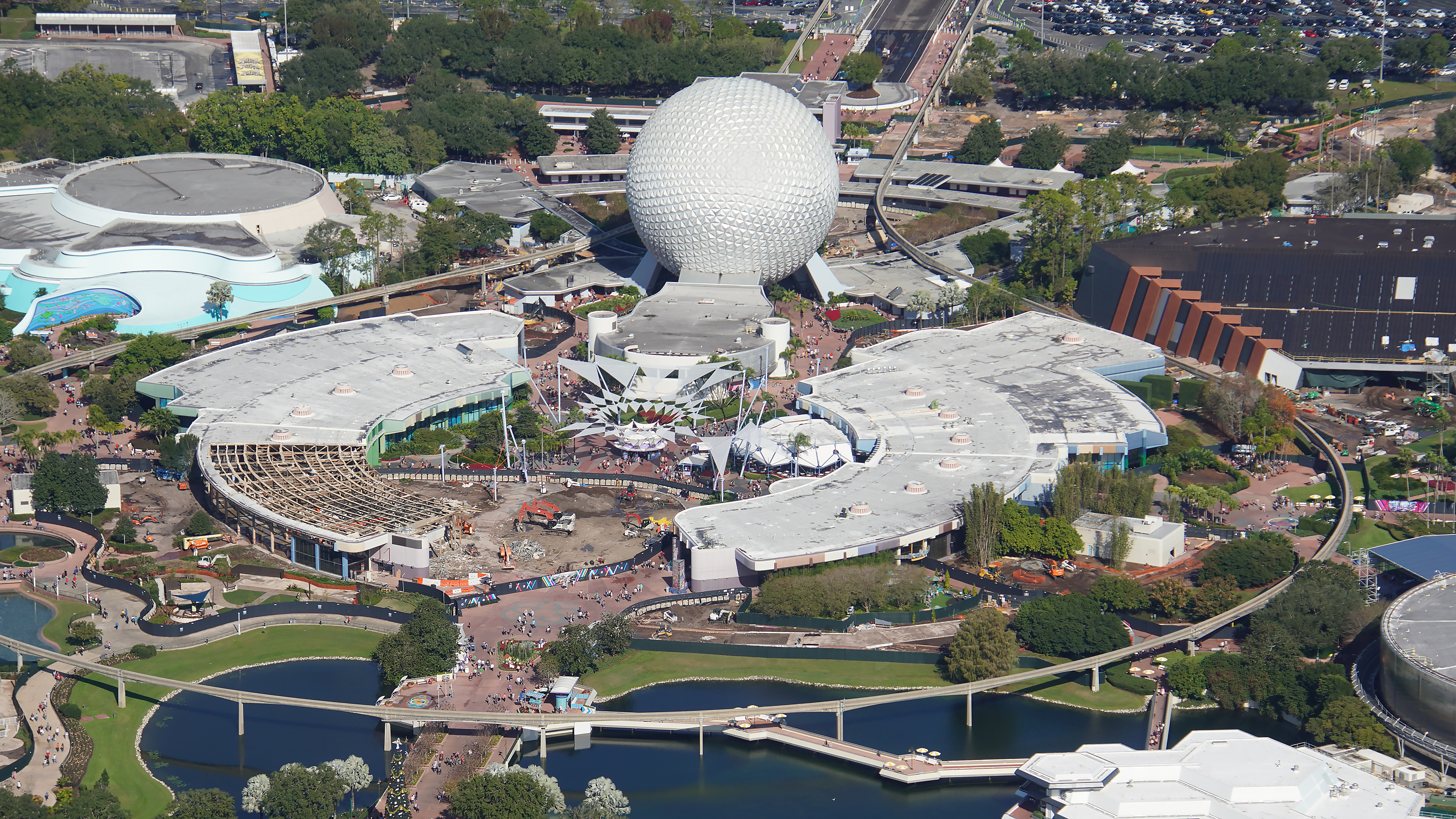
Helicopter view of phase 1 demolition of Innoventions West on December 14, 2019. Portion south of the breezeway has been reduced to structural frame.

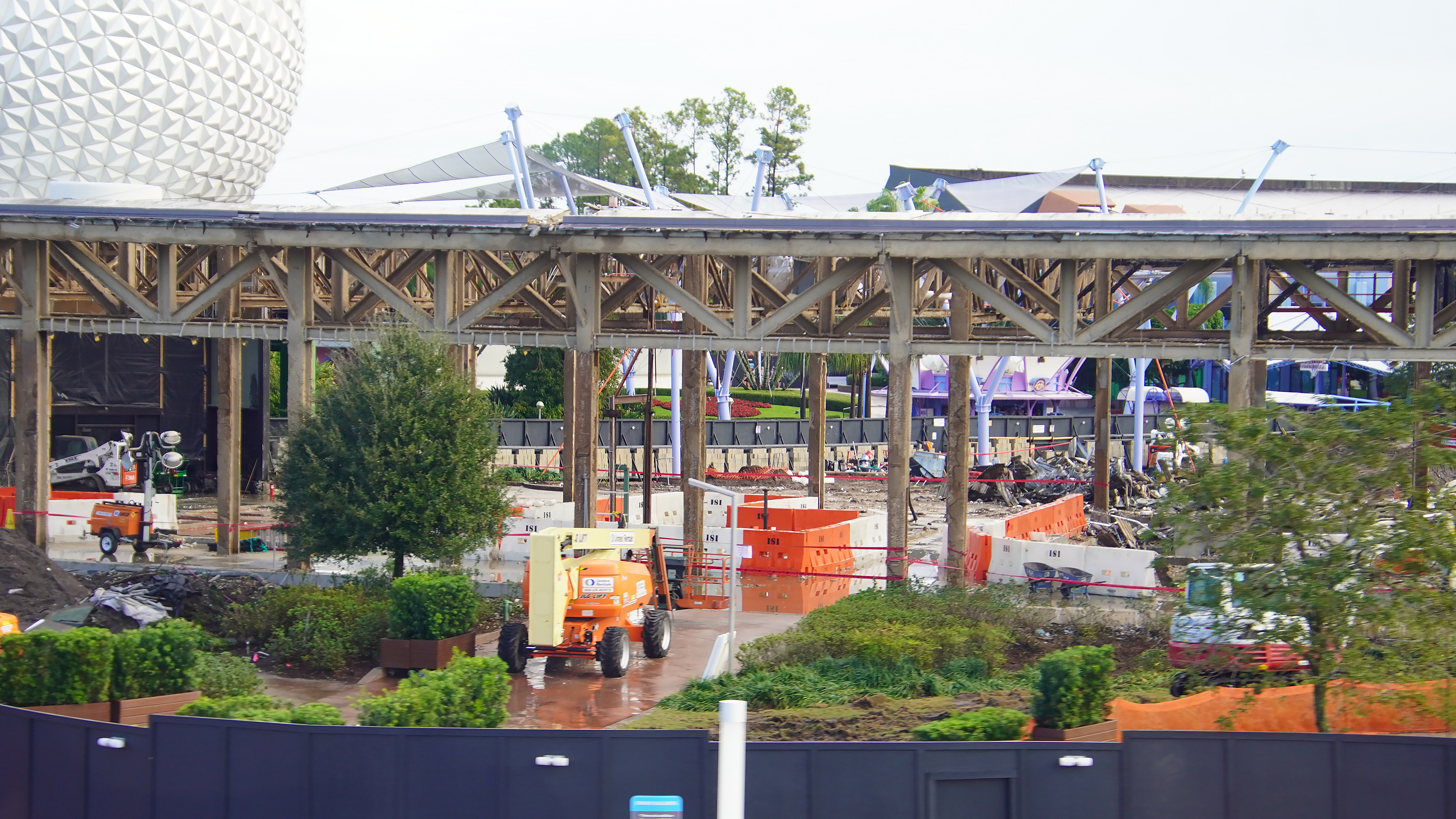
Monorail view looking through the structural frame remaining in the south portion of Innoventions West. Seen on December 14, 2019.

Today, the building that formerly housed Innoventions East has reopened as Connections Eatery, the main quick service restaurant for the front of EPCOT in World Celebration. The building that formerly housed Innoventions West has been completely demolished to make way for the Journey of Water attraction in World Nature, the exhibit space as CommuniCore Hall, and the festival stage as CommuniCore Plaza in World Celebration, which was the named after the demise of the classic Future World pavilions.

== Exhibits and sponsors ==
Previous logo of Innoventions used from 1994–2007.

=== Innoventions East ===
- Apple Computer (September 21, 1994 – January 31, 1998)
- Bill Nye - The Science Guy (April 15, 1998 – June 1, 1999)
- Colortopia, presented by Glidden (November 2015 – September 4, 2019)
- Comfortville, presented by Honeywell (July 1, 1994 – Fall 1996)
- Communications Dream Forum, sponsored by Motorola (October 1995 – May 1, 2003)
- Discover the Stories Behind the Magic (September 24, 2001 – Late 2002)
- Disney Interactive (Spring 1996 – September 3, 1997)
- Disney's Internet Zone, sponsored by Disney.com and Compaq (1999 – July 2007)
- Disney.com Interactive Zone, sponsored by Gateway (1998–1999)
- Don't Waste It!, presented by Waste Management, Inc. (2008 – June 12, 2011)
- Environmentality Corner (2005–2012)
- EPCOT Discovery Center (Fall 1996 – October 3, 1998)
- Family PC (Fall 1995 – June 1, 1999)
- Fantastic Plastics Works, sponsored by Society of the Plastics Industry (August 2004 – March 2008)
- Forests For Our Future, sponsored by TAPPI (1999–2004)
- Future Cars, sponsored by General Motors (1999–2001)
- General Electric (July 1, 1994 – June 1, 1999)
- General Motors (July 1, 1994 – June 1, 1999)
- Hammacher Schlemmer (July 1, 1994 – September 1997)
- Habit Heroes, presented by Blue Cross Blue Shield (February 2012 – January 2016)
- House of Innoventions, sponsored by Panja and Whirlpool (1999 – October 2009)
- Kidcot (2004–2006)
- Kim Possible World Showcase Adventure (2009–2012)
- Look Into the Future (October 1, 1999 – February 19, 2001)
- Magic House Show (July 1, 1994 – Winter 1994)
- Masco's Magic House Tour (July 1, 1994 – Spring 1995)
- Mission: SPACE Launch Center, sponsored by Compaq/HP (May 2001 – 2003)
- Mr. MIDI (June 1995 – September 1995)
- Opportunity City, sponsored by Disney Online and the Kauffman Foundation (2004 – November 1, 2006)
- Oracle Corporation's Information Highway (October 1995 – September 3, 1997)
- Spectaculab, presented by Murata Manufacturing and Science From Scientists (November 12, 2017 – January 13, 2019)
- StormStruck, presented by FLASH (Federal Alliance for Safe Homes) (August 26, 2008 – September 14, 2016)
- The Sum Of All Thrills, presented by Raytheon (October 14, 2009 – September 14, 2016)
- Take a Nanooze Break, sponsored by Cornell University and the National Science Foundation (2010 - September 4, 2019)
- Test the Limits Lab, presented by Underwriters Laboratories Inc. (2003 – January 6, 2015)
- VISION HOUSE, presented by Green Builder Media (2012–2015)
- Web Site Construction Zone, sponsored by GO.com (October 1, 1999 – February 19, 2001)

=== Innoventions West ===
- AT&T (1994–1999)
- Aladdin's Magic Carpet VR Adventure (1996–1997)
- Alec Tronic (1994–1998)
- Beautiful Science, sponsored by Monsanto Company (1999–2004)
- Bill Nye: The Science Guy (1994–1997)
- The Broadband Connection, sponsored by AT&T (1999–2001)
- Discover magazine (1994–1997)
- Eclectronics (1994–1998)
- Enel/Infobyte VR Presentation (1996–1997)
- Epcot's 25th Anniversary Gallery (2007–2008)
- The Great American Farm, sponsored by American Farm Bureau (2004–2008)
- The Great Piggy Bank Adventure, sponsored by T. Rowe Price (May 19, 2009 – May 19, 2015)
- IBM (1994–1997)
- IBM: Solutions for a Small Planet (1998–1999)
- IBM Thinkplace (2002–2009)
- Innoventions Pre-Show (1998-1999)
- Inspired by Vision (1998–1999)
- Knowledge Vortex, sponsored by Xerox (1999-2002)
- LEGO Dacta (1994–1995)
- Look Into the Future (2001–2007)
- Medicine's New Vision, sponsored by The Radiological Community (1999–2002)
- Rockin' Robots' sponsored by KUKA Industrial Robots (2005–2010)
- Genesis, Sega CD, Game Gear, 32X, Sega Pico, Saturn, Dreamcast, sponsored by Sega (1994–1999)
- Segway Central (2006–2013)
- Silicon Graphics (1995–1997)
- Slap Stick Studios, sponsored by Velcro (2008–2011)
- Smarter Planet, presented by IBM (2010–2012)
- THINK, presented by IBM (February 20, 2013 – January 1, 2015)
- Time Warner
- Tom Morrow 2.0's Playground (2001–2007)
- Too Small to See, sponsored by Cornell University (2006–2008)
- The Ultimate Home Theater Experience, sponsored by Lutron (June 1999 – August 1999)
- Videonics (1994–1997)
- Video Games of Tomorrow, sponsored by Disney Interactive (1999–2001)
- Video Game Playground, sponsored by Disney Interactive (2005 – Summer 2015)
- Walt Disney Imagineering Labs (1994–1995)
- Where's The Fire?, Presented by Liberty Mutual Insurance (October 2004 – October 2014)

== Tom Morrow 2.0 ==
Tom Morrow 2.0
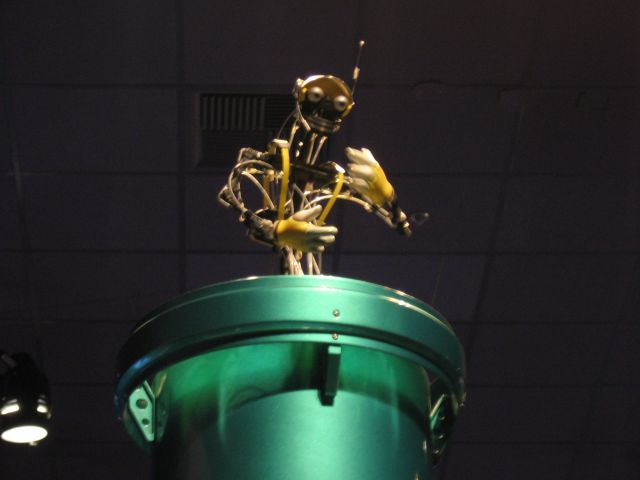
- Tom Morrow 2.0 singing and talking about the various areas of Innoventions.
- First appearance: Imagineer That! and Innoventions; 2000
- Designed by: Walt Disney Imagineering
- Voiced by: Max Casella

In-universe information
- Species: Robot
- Gender: Masculine programming

Epcot's Innoventions' mascot for 2000–2007 is a small Audio-Animatronic character (called a "mini-matronic" by Walt Disney Imagineering) named Tom Morrow 2.0 (voiced by Max Casella), the former host of Disney Channel's Imagineer That! interstitial shorts. He was removed in 2007 during Innoventions' 2007–2008 renovation and stored at Imagineering's offices in Glendale, California. In August 2025, the character was reintroduced for a web video revival of Imagineer That! published on WDI's YouTube channel.

== Area music ==
The Innoventions Area Loop is roughly 20 minutes long and begins with a musical piece by David Arkenstone entitled "Papillon (On The Wings Of The Butterfly)" from his album In the Wake of the Wind. The rest of the music was composed by Russell Brower for Walt Disney Imagineering and is not commercially available. Brower, along with Arkenstone, would then compose the music for the World of Warcraft games.

== See also ==
- Epcot attraction and entertainment history
- Innoventions (Disneyland)
