= The Sum of All Thrills =

The Sum Of All Thrills
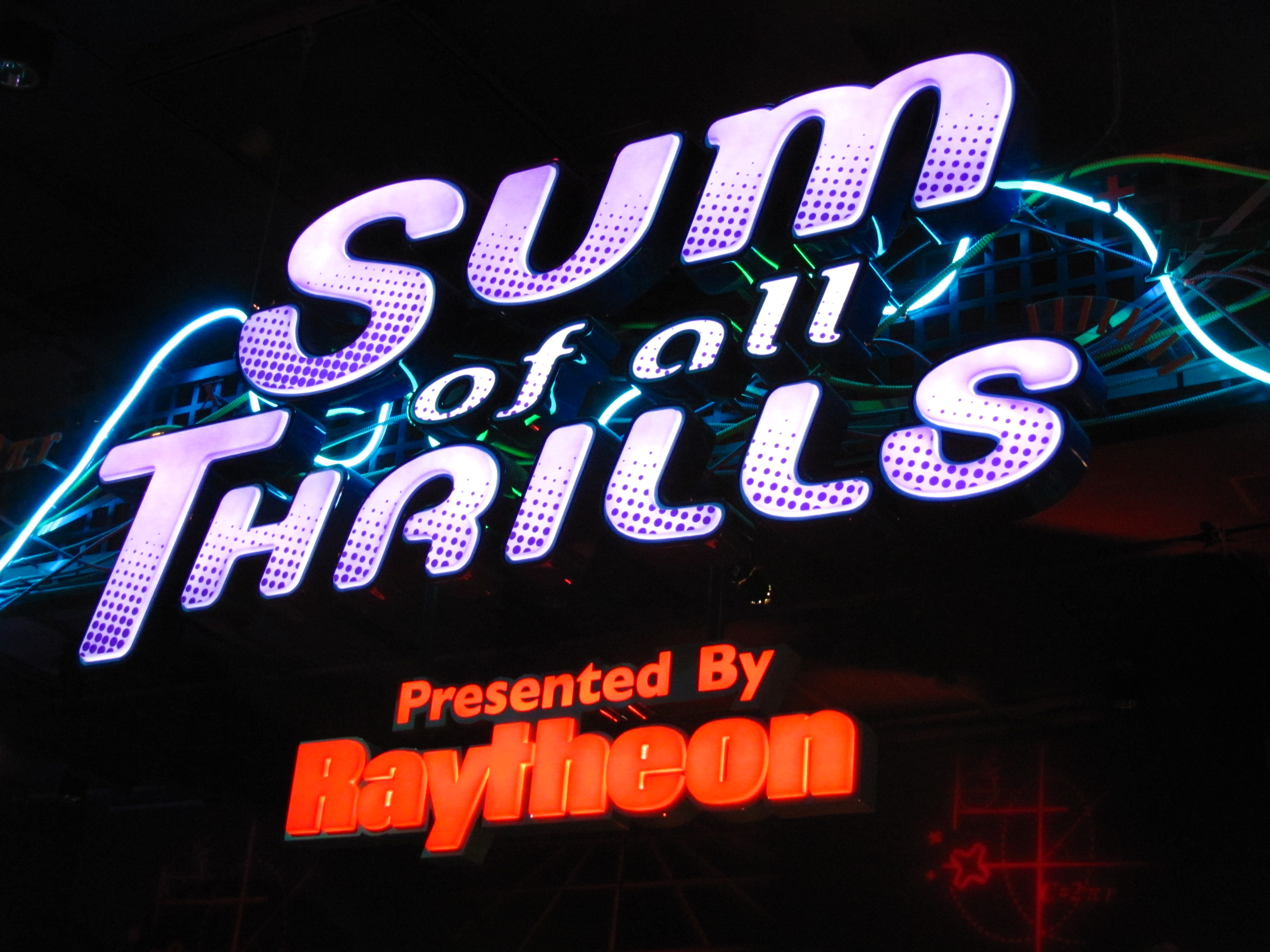

Epcot
- Area: Innoventions
- Status: Closed
- Opening date: October 14, 2009
- Closing date: September 14, 2016

Ride statistics
- Attraction type: Virtual roller coaster
- Manufacturer: KUKA
- Designer: Walt Disney Imagineering, Raytheon
- Vehicles: 4
- Riders per vehicle: 2
- Duration: 1:30
- Height restriction: 48 in (122 cm)
- Sponsor: Raytheon (2009 - 2016)
- Height restriction for rides that go upside down: 54 in (137 cm)
- Ride Website
- Must transfer from wheelchair

The Sum of All Thrills was an attraction at Walt Disney World Resort's Epcot theme park. Sponsored by Raytheon, the ride let park guests custom-design their own thrill ride using mathematical tools, an innovative touch screen table and a robotic simulator.

It opened to the public on October 14, 2009 as the first ride to be located within the Innoventions attraction at Epcot.

Guests designed a thrill ride using an interactive touch screen that let them determine height and speed, while adding features such as dips and corkscrew turns. Once "built", guests climbed aboard their customized design in the 4-D robotic simulator that used sight, sound and movement to give them a realistic experience.

The ride closed on September 14, 2016.

== Ride overview ==
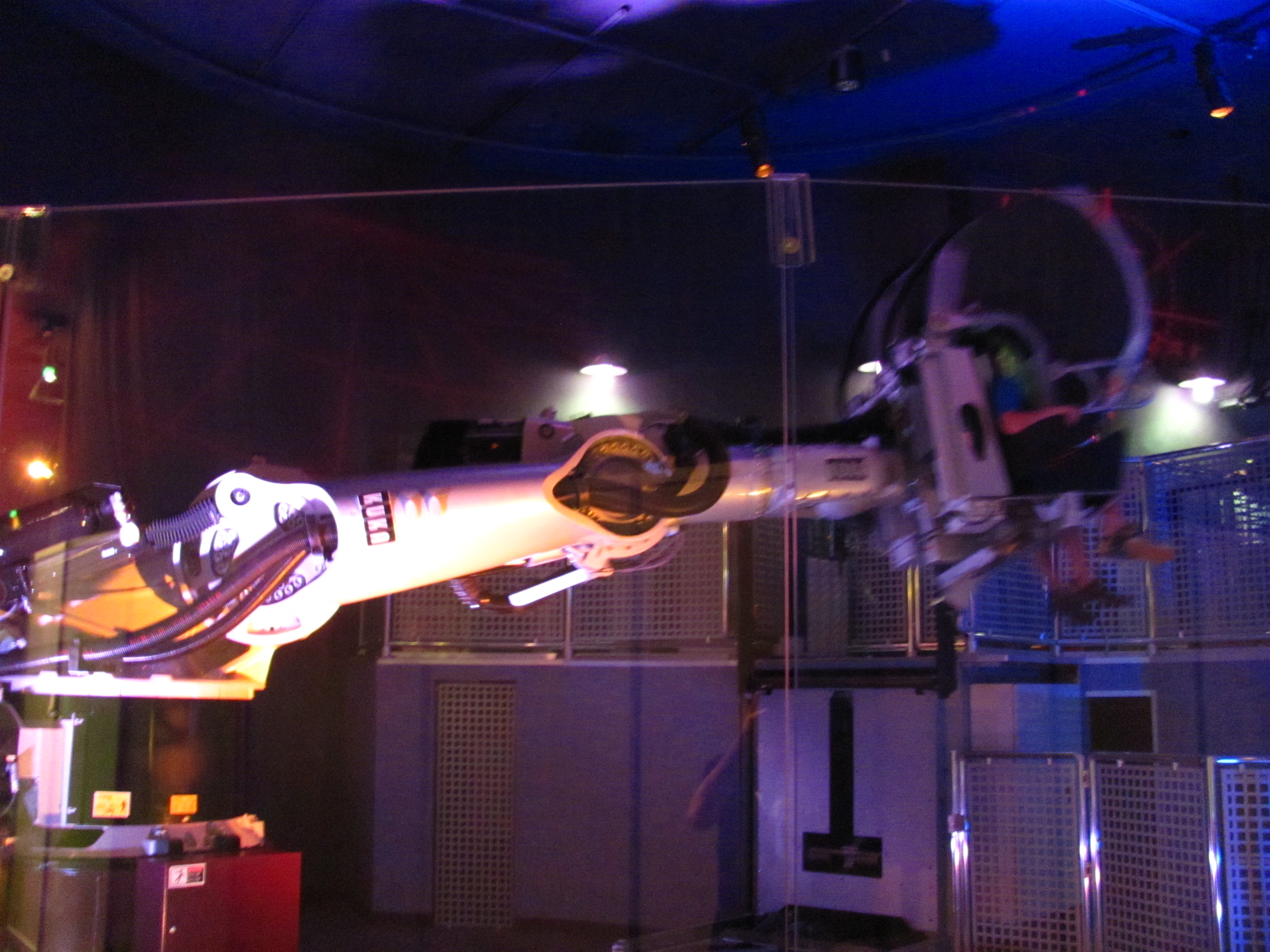
One of the four KUKA Arms in motion

The first-ever Innoventions ride at Epcot, Sum of All Thrills, presented by Raytheon, was a simulated thrill ride. The ride let guests use a computer program to specify the drops, curves and loops of a coaster track before boarding an industrial robotic arm to experience their creation. Three vehicle options were available: bobsled, roller coaster and jet aircraft. It was possible to program actual loops into both the coaster and jet courses, with the robotic arm swinging the rider upside down.

In addition to the vehicle, guests also selected the kinds of turns, loops and hills in their track design. Choices ranged from mild, broad curves to extreme multiple-loop inversions. Using computer-design tools, they could further customize these components by changing the height and width of each piece.

== See also ==
- Epcot attraction and entertainment history
