= The Osborne Family Spectacle of Dancing Lights =

Display of Christmas lights and decorations

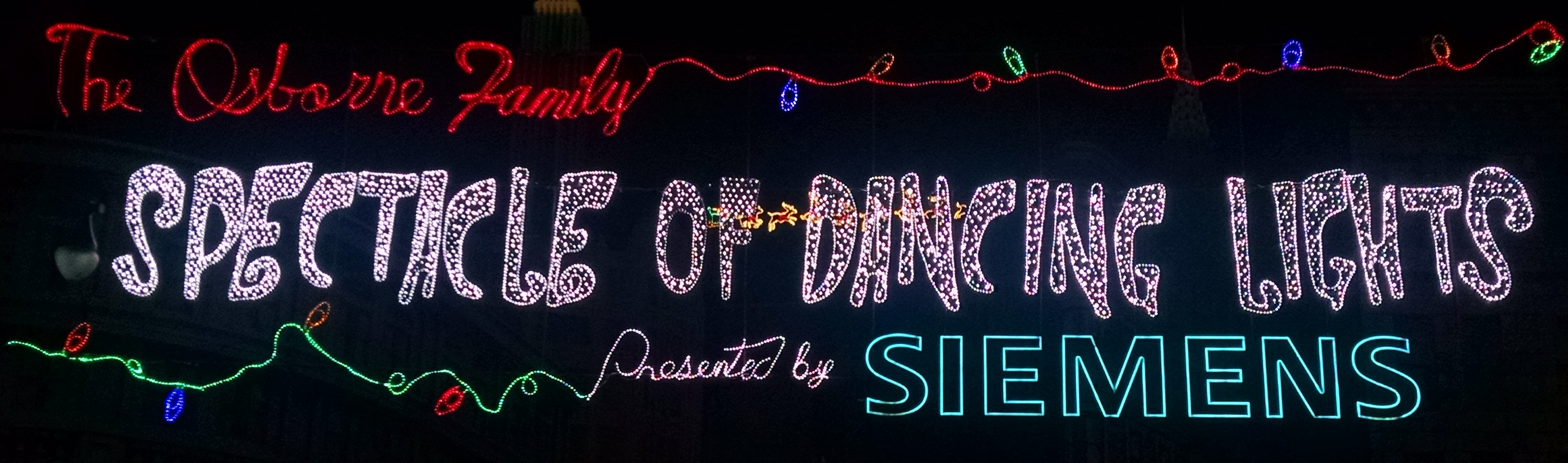

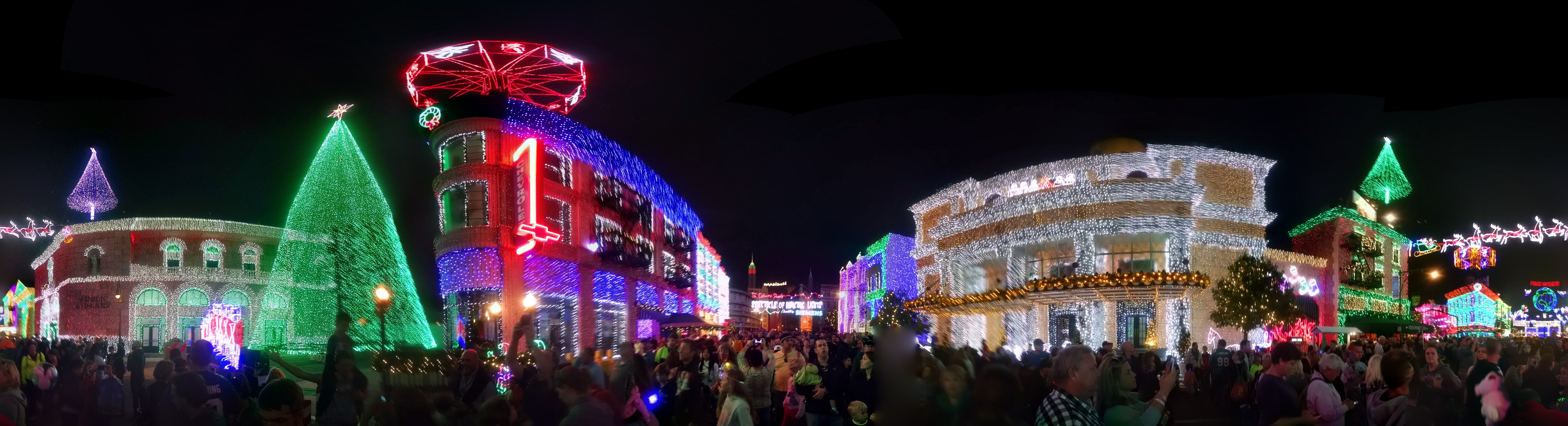
- Panorama of The Osborne Family Spectacle of Dancing Lights in 2014

Disney's Hollywood Studios
- Area: Streets of America
- Coordinates: 28°21′18″N 81°33′35″W
- Status: Removed
- Opening date: 1995
- Closing date: January 6, 2016
- Replaced by: Disney Jollywood Nights; Star Wars: Galaxy's Edge

Ride statistics
- Attraction type: Christmas lights display
- Designer: Jennings Osborne
- Theme: Christmas
- Music: Songs by various artists
- Site area: 59,860 sq ft (5,561 m^{2})
- Sponsor: Sylvania (2005–2013); Siemens (2005–2016)

The Osborne Family Spectacle of Dancing Lights was a display of Christmas lights and decorations at Disney's Hollywood Studios at the Walt Disney World Resort near Orlando, Florida. Initially constructed by an Arkansas businessman as a gift for his six-year-old daughter, the display became one of the most popular attractions during the park's holiday season. It debuted in 1995.

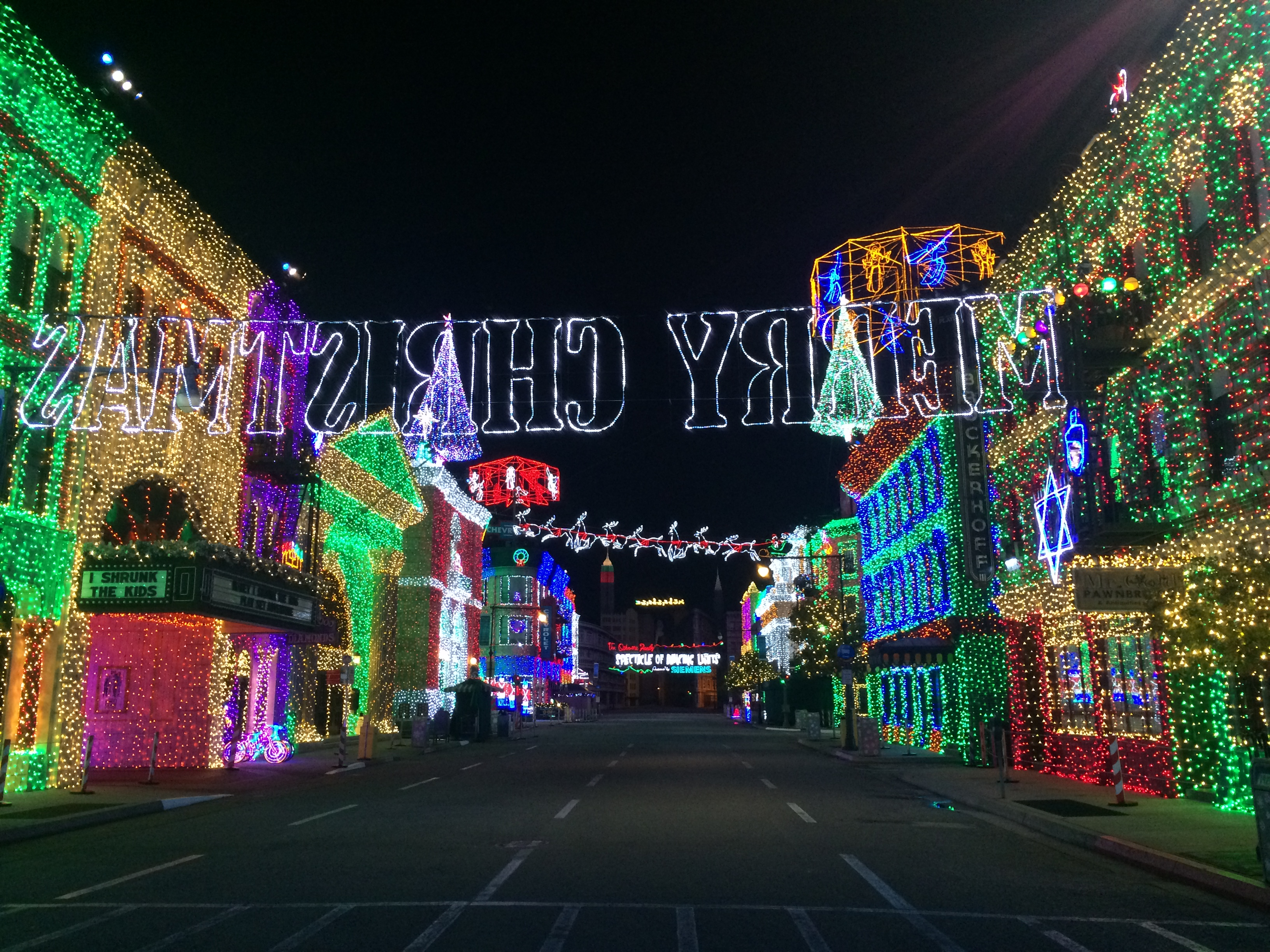
Osborne Family Spectacle of Dancing Lights in Disney's Hollywood Studios.

== History ==
Jennings Osborne (1943–2011), along with his wife Mitzi, founded the "Arkansas Research Medical Testing Center" in Little Rock, Arkansas in 1968. The business' success allowed him and his wife to eventually purchase a large, nearly 12,000 square foot estate in the middle of town in 1976. In 1980, the Osbornes had a daughter, Allison Brianne Osborne, who they nicknamed Breezy.

In 1986, Breezy asked her father if they could decorate their home in lights. Osborne complied, stringing 1000 lights around their home. "Each year after that, it got bigger and bigger," Osborne would later recall. Eventually Osborne purchased the two properties adjacent to his own and expanded the display into them.

By 1993, the display had over three million lights. Some of the more prominent features included:

- an illuminated globe, with Little Rock and Bethlehem marked, mounted in the back yard;
- two rotating carousels of lights, placed on each end of the estate's circular driveway;
- a 70-foot (21 m)-tall Christmas tree of lights with 80,000 lights in three colored layers, mounted atop the home's kitchen; and
- a canopy of 30,000 red lights over a section of the driveway.

The lights were extremely popular in both Arkansas and around the world, as news crews often visited to film the display. Since their house was located on one of the busiest streets in Little Rock, it eventually caused severe traffic issues, and many complaints.

=== Legal issues ===
The display grew bigger every year, with statements from what was previously known as the Arkansas Power and Light company, Entergy Arkansas, claiming the display’s usage of power exceeded the amount of energy used in a year to power a single home in Arkansas during the month of December. After Osborne took out the power for a portion of the neighborhood, the company assigned the home a transformer of its own. By 1993, the lights display lit for 35 days during the Christmas season, from sunset to about midnight every day. Six neighbors filed a lawsuit, saying traffic congestion made trips to the corner store take two hours, and they feared emergency vehicles could not get down the street. Osborne responded by adding three million more lights.

The county court ordered an injunction against the display, limiting it to 15 days and directing that it be lighted only from 7 p.m. to 10:30 p.m. Osborne appealed first to the Arkansas Supreme Court and lost, then in 1994 to the United States Supreme Court, where Justice Clarence Thomas refused to halt the order. In 1995, the state Supreme Court shut down the display altogether.

The Osbornes continued to have a light display, but on a much smaller scale well into the 2000s. After the September 11 attacks of 2001, they erected an enormous lighted American flag with the words "God Bless America and God Bless George W. Bush" across the top and bottom of the flag. This display remained up for several years, even as the strands of lights went out and the message was barely readable.

=== Display acquired by Disney ===
The story of the light display's court case brought national attention, including offers from several cities to host the display. Walt Disney World project director John Phelan contacted Osborne's attorney about moving the display to the Orlando resort, and eventually discussed the potential move with Osborne himself.

Osborne was intrigued by the offer, but initially understood that Disney wanted to put the display on another residential street in Orlando. What Phelan actually offered was to install the display on "Residential Street," a back-lot section at Disney's Hollywood Studios theme park (then known by its original name, the Disney-MGM Studios). Being a fan of the resort himself, and realizing where the display would go, Osborne accepted Disney's offer. In 1995, with the help of four 18-wheelers lugging in their three million lights, the display was set up on Residential Street as "The Osborne Family Spectacle of Lights," becoming an immediate success. The Osbornes continued to visit the display every year up until Jennings' passing.

== Disney's Hollywood Studios display ==
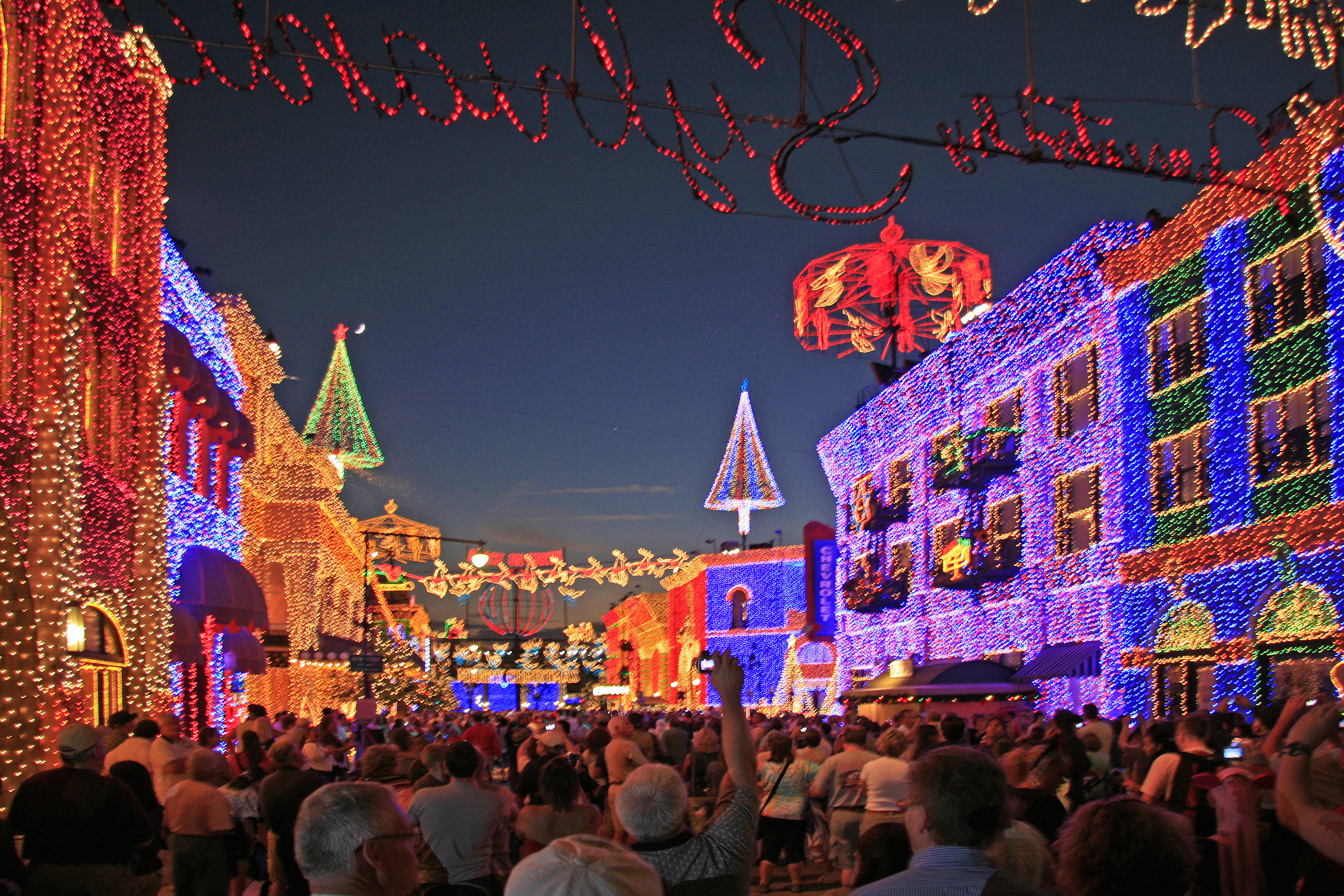
The Osborne lights in Streets of America.

Residential Street was visited using the Studio Backlot Tour's tram vehicles. When the light display was in place, however, the tram tours would stop before sunset, allowing guests to walk among the displays. Initially the display was purely the original lights from the Osborne estate, but in subsequent years the display was augmented to its current size of over five million lights. The display's Disney caretakers have also added a number of hidden Mickeys into the lights and an accidental inclusion of the family’s Halloween decorations along with a number of other decorative references to various Disney animated films such as references to the One Hundred and One Dalmatians film, a small light up display inside a window from Pixar’s Finding Nemo, and Scrooge McDuck from both the original 1987 DuckTales series and 2017 reboot. In addition, they included a small light-up display as an homage to the Star Wars franchise and what would then become the park’s new land, Galaxy’s Edge. The 2007 edition of the display featured over 40 of the icons.

The display was made up of over 10 miles (16 km) of rope lighting connected by another 30 miles (48 km) of extension cords. The extension cords and lights were held together using two million ties. It took 20,000 man-hours to install the display each holiday season, starting in September. The lights were turned on at dusk each night, starting in mid-November and running into the first week of January, and required 800,000 watts of electricity.

In 2004, the park began construction on a new arena for its upcoming Lights! Motors! Action! Extreme Stunt Show, set to open in 2005. Part of the construction included the demolition of Residential Street, thus necessitating another move of the display. The solution was to move it to another part of the park, the New York Street set (now known as the Streets of America). As part of the move, the Studios added an artificial snow effect to the display, made up of 33 snow machines that use 100 US gal (380 L) of fluid per evening.

In 2005, Sylvania became the presenting sponsor of the lights, as part of parent company Siemens's long-term sponsorship deal with the Walt Disney Company's theme parks, which also included the Spaceship Earth and IllumiNations: Reflections of Earth attractions at Epcot.

For the 2006 edition, the park added over 1500 dimmer relay circuits and control switches to the display to enable the lights to dim on and off electronically. The relays were choreographed to a musical score, and the display was given its current name.

In 2011, the display had a major overhaul, all the lights were swapped out for LED lights including all the rope light. During this overhaul, the lighting control was updated to a "state of the art" entertainment lighting system. This means all the previously choreographed dancing sequences had to be redone. While all these updates were happening, the production team wanted to change one more major element to the display; the canopy. The canopy in previous years was all red and separated in only 8 circuits, 4 on each side; now each light has 3 completely controllable LEDs (Red, Green, Blue) giving the canopy an almost video-like appearance. Now the canopy has 21,600 pixels capable of over 16 million colors.

In 2013, Siemens took over sponsorship, replacing Sylvania, the company's former subsidiary; the brand's owner Osram was spun off into its own company on July 5, 2013

In 2014, reserved viewing of the lights was offered for the first time as part of a "Frozen Holiday Premium Package" themed around the movie Frozen.

On September 11, 2015, Disney announced that the 2015 holiday season would be the final season for the Osborne Family Spectacle of Dancing Lights, with the announcement of Galaxy’s Edge and Toy Story Land occurring one month prior, and the final performance was scheduled for January 3, 2016. On January 3, 2016, it was announced the final season would be extended by 3 more nights, with the final performance rescheduled for January 6, 2016. The final songs the lights danced to were "Have Yourself a Merry Little Christmas" and "Mickey Mouse Club Alma Mater". With the lights’ sunsetting in the parks, the majority of them were then donated to the Give the Kids the World charity in Kissimmee, Florida. And for several years, the lights were used for the charity’s “Night of a Million Lights” event.

=== "Dancing Lights" ===
Whenever a choreographed song was played, the lights "dance" to the music. After each performance, the lights remained steady for about seven minutes before "dancing" again to another selection; other holiday selections play during the intermissions, along with recorded "live" segments from a fictional radio station (with Arnie and Anne) and visits from Disney characters. The dancing segments cycled roughly every 40–60 minutes.

=== Last Dancing Song List ===
- "Christmas Eve (Sarajevo 12-24)" by Trans-Siberian Orchestra
- "Jingle Bells" by Barbra Streisand
- "A Mad Russian's Christmas" by Trans-Siberian Orchestra
- "Feliz Navidad" by José Feliciano
- "Here Comes Santa Claus" by Elvis Presley
- "Parade of the Wooden Soldiers" by Arthur Fiedler & Boston Pops Orchestra
- "Nuttin' for Christmas" by the Plain White T's (from the special Prep & Landing: Naughty vs. Nice)
- "Christmas is Starting Now" by Big Bad Voodoo Daddy (from the Phineas and Ferb Christmas Vacation special)
- "Winter Wonderland" (Original arrangement by Dan Stamper)
- "What's This?" by Danny Elfman (from Tim Burton's The Nightmare Before Christmas)
- "Have Yourself a Merry Little Christmas" by Frank Sinatra
- "Mickey Mouse Club Alma Mater" by Jimmie Dodd and Mouseketeers
