= Habit Heroes =

Interactive exhibit at Walt Disney World

Epcot
- Area: Future World
- Coordinates: 28°22′27.44″N 81°32′59.51″W
- Status: Removed
- Soft opening date: February 4, 2012
- Opening date: January 18, 2013
- Closing date: January 17, 2016

Ride statistics
- Designer: Walt Disney Imagineering
- Located in: Innoventions East
- Sponsored by: Florida Blue Cross

Habit Heroes was an interactive exhibit located within Innoventions at Epcot in Walt Disney World. Designed to promote healthy habits by battling "bad habits" personified as villains, the exhibit soft-opened on February 4, 2012. However, due to widespread public backlash, Disney closed the attraction days before its planned public opening.

Following extensive research and consultation with medical professionals, Disney retooled the exhibit. The revamped Habit Heroes opened to the public on January 18, 2013. Disney closed the exhibit without warning on January 17, 2016.

== Original attraction ==
Conceived as a unique interactive experience, the attraction was initially housed within a simulated gymnasium that served as the secret headquarters for a superhero organization dedicated to combating unhealthy habits. Led by character hosts Will Power and Callie Stenics, participants were recruited to become "health heroes", tasked with acquiring the skills needed to defeat villains that embodied negative lifestyle choices.

=== Controversy and feedback ===
Upon its debut, Habit Heroes was widely lambasted by medical experts, many of whom accused it of reinforcing negative stereotypes of overweight and obese people. The National Association to Advance Fat Acceptance feared that these stereotypes would reinforce and strengthen a cycle of bullying, depression, disease, eating disorders and even suicidal thoughts". Medical weight management specialist Yoni Freedhoff denounced the exhibit as "horrifying" and "demonstrating a complete lack of understanding".

Within two days of the exhibit's initial opening, Disney decided to close it for retooling, prior to its official March 3 opening date. One writer expressed disturbance that "Disney and Florida Blue felt the need to cave under the loud and misguided views of people who clearly didn't understand the exhibit," and lauded the exhibit's effectiveness in conveying its message.

== Revamped attraction ==
During the retooling, Imagineers at Disney consulted various national experts in children's health, weight and nutrition, including an obesity expert from Stanford University and a nutritional scientist from Cornell University. They sought assistance in retooling and recreating the attraction from scratch following the backlash. Characters Will Powers and Callie Stenics, as well as the notorious villains, have been replaced in favor of four more heroes - Director Jin and three agents, Agent Dynamo, representing physical activity, Agent Quench, representing hydration, and Agent Fuel, representing healthy eating and nutrition. The villains were replaced with more pestilent opponents - Blocker-Bots (opponents that hid healthy food choices), Sappers (sentient boulders that prevent people from undertaking physical activity) and Scorchers (sentient flames that could dehydrate people without their knowledge).

=== Activities ===
Although retaining the identical floorplan of the previous attraction, the improved attraction contained three activities: one incorporating exactly the same dance grid, this time, encouraging guests to practice their 'power moves' against the pestilent opponents. Next, retaining the same cannons, participants would defend a city by shooting at the same opponents. In the final activity, with the cylindrical room and multiple control panels, participants would defend the world targeting the same opponents as before.

The attraction is notable for its use of cast-member interaction and mediation to the guests participating in it, and afterwards, there was an opportunity for guests to receive a mission in response to their chosen health habit to improve on. Also notable is the mobile application which encourages users to improve their chosen health habit via various activities (such as a pedometer for walking exercises).

=== Response ===
Since the retooling, the attraction was cited by the SunSentinel as a "kinder, more sensitive attraction" compared with earlier on, and despite mixed reviews, the improved attraction was well received by guests alike. Even Freedhoff wrote a follow-up blog post, praising the improvements.

== See also ==
- Innoventions (Epcot)
- Wonders of Life, a pavilion containing a set of similarly themed attractions (now closed)
