= Derren Brown's Ghost Train =

Dark ride in Surrey, England

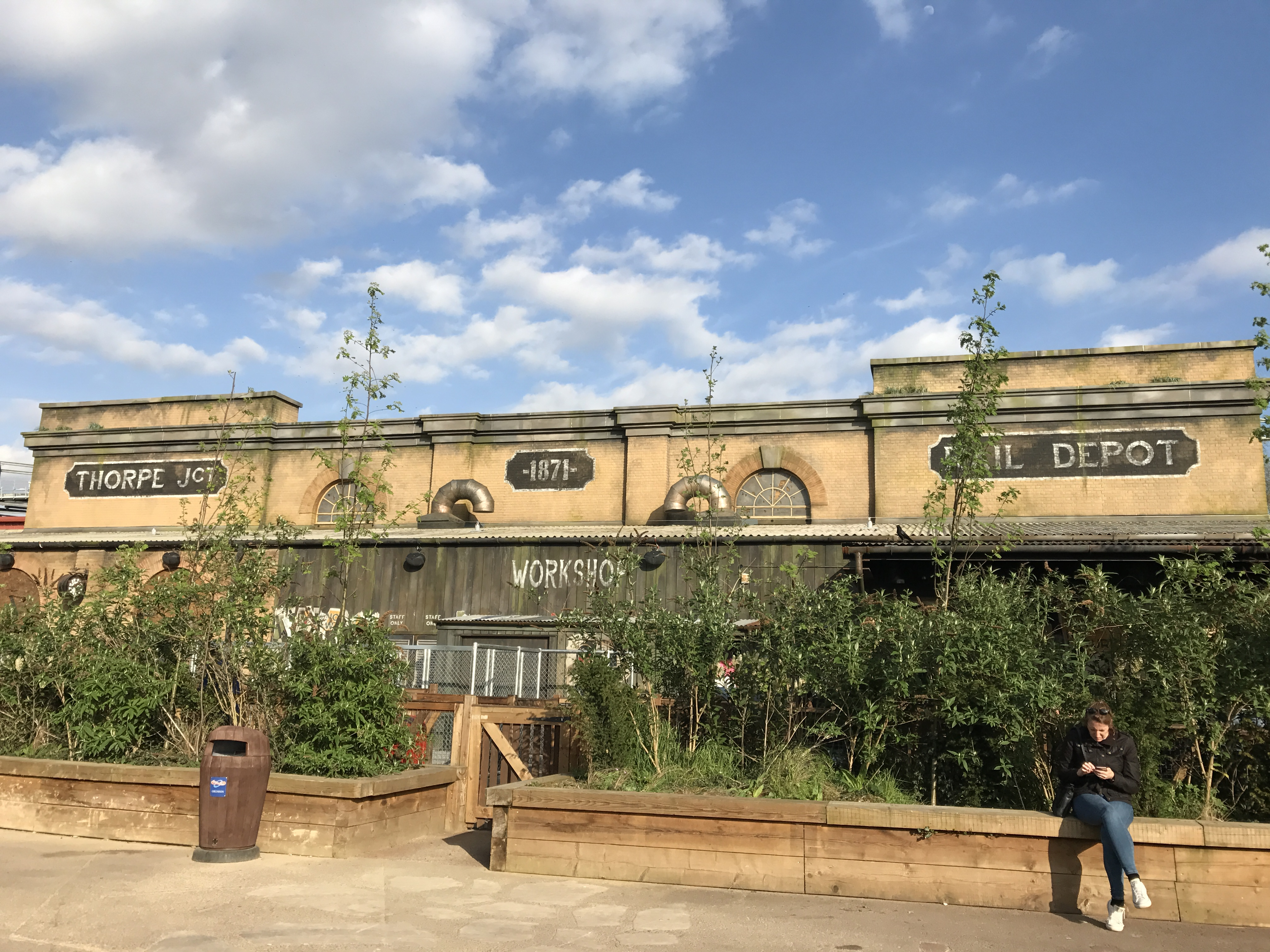
- Exterior of the attraction

Thorpe Park
- Area: The Dock Yard
- Status: Closed
- Cost: £13 million (reported)
- Opening date: 8 July 2016
- Closing date: 31 October 2022
- Replaced by: Ghost Train

Ride statistics
- Attraction type: Dark ride Live action
- Manufacturers: Simworx & Intamin
- Designer: Merlin Magic Making, Derren Brown
- Music: IMAScore
- Site area: 2,306 m^{2} (24,820 sq ft)
- Capacity: 750 riders per hour
- Vehicles: 3
- Riders per vehicle: 58
- Rows: 2
- Riders per row: 29
- Participants per group: Max 58
- Duration: 13–15 minutes
- Height restriction: 140 cm (4 ft 7 in)
- Fastrack available
- Wheelchair accessible

Derren Brown's Ghost Train was a dark ride attraction located at Thorpe Park in Surrey, England. The ride combined motion simulation, virtual reality headsets, illusion, multisensory special effects, and live actors. It was created in collaboration with and featured appearances from British mentalist Derren Brown. It was themed as a derelict Victorian railway depot, in which guests experience boarding a modern tube train and encounter an underground demon.

The ride hardware was manufactured by Intamin, Simworx and Severn Lamb. In its second year, it received several changes and was renamed Derren Brown's Ghost Train: Rise Of The Demon. It closed at the end of 2022 and reopened as Ghost Train in May 2023, with the Derren Brown connection removed.

== History ==
Derren Brown's Ghost Train was first teased on 8 July 2015 after reportedly three years in planning. The project name was referred to as 'WC16'.

Merlin Magic Making, the development division of Merlin Entertainments, produced the attraction in collaboration with Derren Brown and his team. The main experience was a simulator dark ride built by Simworx with on-board virtual reality (produced by Figment Productions). Severn Lamb and Intamin designed and engineered the complex transit system.

The project altogether was reported in the Financial Times as having a cost of £13 million.

In anticipation of the new attraction, Thorpe Park began a "Get in for a Bob" promotion, where 1871 people would be able to purchase a ticket into the resort for the modern-day equivalent of a shilling in Victorian times, which equals 5 pence. The website was published earlier than the scheduled time which resulted in many being unable to get tickets. The resort offered that those who registered their name before the website closed would be entered into a raffle, where a further 4,000 12 pence tickets would be allocated at random.

The attraction was originally set to open on 6 May 2016, as announced on their social networks. However one week before the attraction was set to open, the resort announced the attraction would not be ready due to "some illusions not working as anticipated".

After the 2022 season, the ride closed to be revamped and its association with Derren Brown was discontinued.

== Ride experience ==
Guests join the attraction’s queue outside the ride building, which is themed as a derelict railway depot and features mock protest posters referencing fracking. Between 2016 and 2018, designated photo opportunities were available within the queue line.

The experience begins in a darkened pre-show room, where guests view a Pepper’s ghost projection of Derren Brown delivering a presentation on fear as a form of entertainment. Guests then proceed into the main station area, which features a Victorian North Eastern Railway carriage displayed as if suspended from the ceiling by chains. Boarding the train, guests enter the interior of a modern London Underground 1995 Stock carriage, hosted by uniformed staff. Riders are seated and fitted with HTC Vive virtual reality headsets, while an in-universe advertisement for a fictional fracking company, “Sub Core,” plays in the background.

Once the train appears to depart, the ride experience begins. Through the virtual reality sequence, guests witness events involving a passenger discussing the consequences of a fracking-related disaster, followed by the appearance of an infected passenger who appears to attack the viewer. After a simulated train crash, guests are instructed to leave their seats and evacuate the carriage.

Guests then enter a derelict present-day Underground station, where the exterior of the train is revealed to be a modern London Underground 1995 Stock unit. This section originally featured live actors, an animated train crash sequence, and smoke projection effects before guests re-boarded the carriage; however, in 2018 this scene was replaced with a strobe-lit maze.

Upon re-boarding, guests don the headsets again as the train appears to resume movement. The second virtual reality sequence depicts the train and its passengers being attacked by a demonic entity, culminating in the illusion of falling from the train into a fiery underworld and into the creature’s mouth. The experience concludes with a voiceover from Derren Brown announcing the end of the attraction, followed by a final jump-scare and a brief surprise scene before guests exit through the gift shop.

== See also ==
- HTC Vive, the VR headsets the ride used.
