= List of Intamin rides =

This is a list of Intamin amusement rides. Some were supplied by, but not manufactured by, Intamin. (Note: Intamin was primarily a ride broker until around 1998. Prior to 1998 Intamin subcontracted all of their work, using suppliers such as Schwarzkopf GMBH, Waagner-Biro, Giovanola, Von Roll, Willy Buhler Space Towers and RCCA)

== List of roller coasters ==
As of 2021, Intamin has built 172 roller coasters around the world.

Name	Model	Park	Country	Opened	Status	Ref
Wilderness Run; Formerly Jr. Gemini	Children's Coaster	Cedar Point	United States	1979	Operating	
American Eagle	Wooden Racing Coaster	Six Flags Great America	United States	1981	Operating	
Montaña Rusa Infantil	Children's Coaster	Parque de la Ciudad	Argentina	1982	Removed	
Vertigorama	Sitting Coaster	Parque de la Ciudad	Argentina	1983	Closed	
Super Montaña Rusa Infantil	Children's Coaster	Parque de la Ciudad	Argentina	1983	Removed	
Bob	Swiss Bob	Efteling	Netherlands	1985	Removed	
Disaster Transport; Formerly Avalanche Run	Swiss Bob	Cedar Point	United States	1985	Removed	
La Vibora; Formerly Avalanche; Formerly Sarajevo Bobsleds	Swiss Bob	Six Flags Over Texas; Six Flags Magic Mountain	United States	1986; 1984 to 1985	Removed	
Woodstock Express; Formerly Runaway Reptar; Formerly Green Smile Mine Car; Formerly Blue Streak; Formerly Scooby Doo	Children's Coaster	California's Great America; Hannah Barbera Land	United States	1987; 1984 to 1986	Operating	
Unknown	Family Coaster	Al-Rawdah Sharaco Amusement Park	Saudi Arabia	1988	Removed	
Pegasus	Wooden Coaster	Efteling	Netherlands	1991	Removed	
Jupiter	Wooden Coaster	Kijima Kogen	Japan	1992	Operating	
Flashback; Formerly Z-Force	Space Diver	Six Flags Magic Mountain; Six Flags Over Georgia; Six Flags Great America	United States	1992; 1988 to 1990; 1985 to 1987	Removed	
Indiana Jones et le Temple du Péril; Formerly Indiana Jones et le Temple du Péril: à l'envers	Looping Coaster	Disneyland Paris	France	1993	Operating	
Dragon	Family Coaster	La Ronde	Canada	1994	Operating	
The Wave; Formerly Shockwave	Looping Coaster; Formerly Stand-Up	Drayton Manor Resort	United Kingdom	1994	Operating	
White Cyclone	Wooden Coaster	Nagashima Spa Land	Japan	1994	Converted now known as Hakugei	
Cobra; Formerly Stand Up	Stand-Up Coaster	La Ronde; Skara Sommarland	Canada	1995	Removed	
Comet Express	Twist and Turn Coaster	Lotte World	South Korea	1995	Operating	
Family Coaster; Formerly Viper	Family Coaster	Play Village	South Korea	1995	Operating	
Cop Car Chase; Formerly Lethal Weapon Pursuit	Looping Coaster	Movie Park Germany	Germany	1996	Removed	
Skull Mountain	Family Coaster	Six Flags Great Adventure	United States	1996	Operating	
Tower of Terror II; Formerly Tower of Terror	Reverse Freefall Coaster	Dreamworld	Australia	1997	Removed	
Mine Train Ulven	Family Coaster	Bakken	Denmark	1997	Operating	
Superman: Escape from Krypton; Formerly Superman The Escape	Reverse Freefall Coaster	Six Flags Magic Mountain	United States	1997	Removed	
Montanha Russa do Astronauta; Formerly O Mundo da Xuxa; Formerly Silverado	Family Coaster	Parque da Mônica	Brazil	1997	Operating	
Alpine Bobsled; Formerly Rolling Thunder; Formerly Sarajevo Bobsled	Swiss Bob	Six Flags Great Escape; Six Flags Great America; Six Flags Great Adventure	United States	1998; 1989 to 1995; 1984 to 1988	Removed	
Aska	Wooden Coaster	Nara Dreamland	Japan	1998	Removed	
Linear Gale	Impulse Coaster	Tokyo Dome City	Japan	1998	Removed	
Volcano, The Blast Coaster	Suspended Catapult Coaster	Kings Dominion	United States	1998	Removed	
Screamin' Delta Demon	Swiss Bob	Old Indiana Fun-n-Water Park; Opryland USA	United States	1998; 1984 to 1997	Removed	
Vurang	Twist and Turn Coaster	Hopi Hari	Brazil	1999	Operating	
Ride of Steel; Superman - Ride of Steel	Mega Coaster	Six Flags Darien Lake	United States	1999	Operating	
Tornado	Suspended Looping Coaster	Parque de Atracciones de Madrid	Spain	1999	Operating	
Spiral Coaster; Formerly Sky Plaza Comet	Spiral Coaster	Al-Sha'ab Leisure Park; Sky Plaza	Kuwait	2000	Removed	
Regina II; Formerly Regina	Wooden Coaster	Tobu Zoo Park	Japan	2000	Operating	
Superman the Ride; Formerly Bizarro; Formerly Superman - Ride of Steel	Mega Coaster	Six Flags New England	United States	2000	Operating	
Millennium Force	Giga Coaster	Cedar Point	United States	2000	Operating	
Superman - Ride of Steel	Mega Coaster	Six Flags America	United States	2000	Removed	
Screaming Condor	Impulse Coaster	Leofoo Village Theme Park	Taiwan	2001	Operating	
Incredicoaster; Formerly California Screamin'	Looping Coaster	Disney California Adventure	United States	2001	Operating	
Elf	Wooden Coaster	Hirakata Park	Japan	2001	Operating	
Colossos - Kampf der Giganten; Formerly Colossos	Wooden Coaster (Prefabricated track)	Heide Park	Germany	2001	Operating	
Tornado	Suspended Looping Coaster	Särkänniemi Amusement Park	Finland	2001	Operating	
The Flash: Vertical Velocity; Formerly Vertical Velocity	Impulse Coaster	Six Flags Great America	United States	2001	Operating	
The Flash: Vertical Velocity; Formerly Vertical Velocity	Impulse Coaster	Six Flags Discovery Kingdom	United States	2001	Operating	
Expedition GeForce	Mega Coaster	Plopsaland Deutschland	Germany	2001	Operating	
Sahara Twist	Twist and Turn Coaster	Leofoo Village Theme Park	Taiwan	2002	Operating	
Colossus	Looping Coaster	Thorpe Park	United Kingdom	2002	Operating	
Goliath	Mega Coaster	Walibi Holland	Netherlands	2002	Operating	
Wicked Twister	Impulse Coaster	Cedar Point	United States	2002	Removed	
Avalancha	Looping Coaster	Xetulul	Guatemala	2002	Operating	
Xcelerator	Accelerator Coaster	Knott's Berry Farm	United States	2002	Operating	
Future World Experience	Family Coaster	Mega Web	Japan	2002	Removed	
Balder	Wooden Coaster (Prefabricated track)	Liseberg	Sweden	2003	Operating	
Half Pipe	Half Pipe Coaster	Särkänniemi Amusement Park	Finland	2003	Removed	
Thunder Dolphin	Mega Coaster	Tokyo Dome City	Japan	2003	Operating	
Top Thrill Dragster	Accelerator Coaster	Cedar Point	United States	2003	Operating	
Steel Venom	Impulse Coaster	Valleyfair	United States	2003	Operating	
Supersonic Odyssey	Looping Coaster	Berjaya Times Square Theme Park	Malaysia	2003	Operating	
Atlantis Adventure	Aqua Trax	Lotte World	South Korea	2003	Operating	
Storm Runner	Accelerator Coaster	Hersheypark	United States	2004	Operating	
Half Pipe	Half Pipe Coaster	Elitch Gardens	United States	2004	Operating	
Galaxy Express 999	Family Launch Coaster	Aqua Park	Japan	2005	Removed	
Rita; Formerly Rita - Queen of Speed	Accelerator Coaster	Alton Towers	United Kingdom	2005	Operating	
Kingda Ka	Accelerator Coaster	Six Flags Great Adventure	United States	2005	Removed	
Half Pipe	Half Pipe Coaster	Don Quijote	Japan	2005	Scrapped	
Skycar	Accelerator Coaster	Mysterious Island	China	2005	Operating	
Superman Escape	Accelerator Coaster	Warner Bros. Movie World	Australia	2005	Operating	
Raging Spirits	Looping Coaster	Tokyo DisneySea	Japan	2005	Operating	
Unknown; Formerly Batman The Escape; Formerly Shockwave	Stand-Up Coaster	Six Flags Darien Lake; Six Flags AstroWorld; Six Flags Great Adventure; Six Flags Magic Mountain	United States	2006; 1993 to 2005; 1990 to 1992; 1986 to 1988	Scrapped	
Flight of the Phoenix	Looping Coaster	Harborland	China	2006	Removed	
10 Inversion Roller Coaster	Looping Coaster	Chimelong Paradise	China	2006	Operating	
Half Pipe	Half Pipe Coaster	Chimelong Paradise	China	2006	Closed	
Stealth	Accelerator Coaster	Thorpe Park	United Kingdom	2006	Operating	
Speed Monster	Accelerator Coaster	TusenFryd	Norway	2006	Operating	
El Toro	Wooden Coaster (Prefabricated track)	Six Flags Great Adventure	United States	2006	Operating	
Kirnu	Zac Spin	Linnanmäki	Finland	2007	Operating	
Desert Race	Accelerator Coaster	Heide Park	Germany	2007	Operating	
Maverick	Blitz Coaster	Cedar Point	United States	2007	Operating	
Furius Baco	Accelerator Coaster	PortAventura Park	Spain	2007	Operating	
Inferno	Zac Spin	Terra Mítica	Spain	2007	Operating	
Motocoaster	Family Launch Coaster	Dreamworld	Australia	2007	Operating	
Kawasemi	Mega-Lite	Tobu Zoo Park	Japan	2008	Operating	
T Express	Wooden Coaster (Prefabricated track)	Everland	South Korea	2008	Operating	
Avatar Airbender	Half Pipe Coaster	Nickelodeon Universe inside the Mall of America	United States	2008	Operating	
Piraten	Mega-Lite	Djurs Sommerland	Denmark	2008	Operating	
Possessed; Formerly Voodoo; Formerly Steel Venom; Formerly Superman Ultimate Escape	Impulse Coaster	Dorney Park; Geauga Lake	United States	2008; 2000 to 2006	Operating	
Fahrenheit	Looping Coaster	Hersheypark	United States	2008	Operating	
Jet Rescue	Family Launch Coaster	Sea World	Australia	2008	Operating	
Fly Over Mediterranean	Mega-Lite	Happy Valley Chengdu	China	2009	Operating	
Tornado	Spinning Coaster	Bakken	Denmark	2009	Operating	
Insane	Zac Spin	Gröna Lund	Sweden	2009	Operating	
iSpeed	Blitz Coaster	Mirabilandia	Italy	2009	Operating	
Mega-Lite	Mega-Lite	Happy Valley Shanghai	China	2009	Operating	
Mine Train Coaster	Family Coaster	Happy Valley Shanghai	China	2009	Operating	
Thirteen	Multidimensional Coaster	Alton Towers	United Kingdom	2010	Operating	
Pantherian; Formerly Project 305; Formerly Intimidator 305	Giga Coaster	Kings Dominion	United States	2010	Operating	
RC Racer	Half Pipe Coaster	Walt Disney Studios Park	France	2010	Operating	
Formula Rossa	Accelerator Coaster	Ferrari World Abu Dhabi	United Arab Emirates	2010	Operating	
Cheetah Hunt	Blitz Coaster	Busch Gardens Tampa	United States	2011	Operating	
RC	Half Pipe Coaster	Hong Kong Disneyland	China	2011	Operating	
Surfrider	Half Pipe Coaster	Atallah Happy Land Park	Saudi Arabia	2012	Operating	
Skyrush	Wing Coaster	Hersheypark	United States	2012	Operating	
Divertical	Water Coaster	Mirabilandia	Italy	2012	Operating	
Juvelen	Family Launch Coaster	Djurs Sommerland	Denmark	2013	Operating	
Maceraperest	Family Coaster	İsfanbul	Turkey	2013	Operating	
U-shaped Roller Coaster	Half Pipe Coaster	Victory Kingdom	China	2013	Closed	
Crazy Coaster	Looping Coaster	Loca Joy Holiday Theme Park	China	2013	Operating	
Harry Potter and the Escape from Gringotts	SFX Coaster	Universal Studios Florida	United States	2014	Operating	
Nefeskesen	Blitz Coaster	İsfanbul	Turkey	2014	Operating	
Altair; Formerly Altair CCW-0204	Looping Coaster	Cinecittà World	Italy	2014	Operating	
Inferno; Formerly Darkmare	Multidimensional Coaster	Cinecittà World	Italy	2014	Operating	
Euro Express	Looping Coaster	Romon U-Park	China	2015	Operating	
Red Fire	Blitz Coaster	Korsan Adasi	Turkey	2015	Operating	
Family Coaster	Family Coaster	Korsan Adasi	Turkey	2015	Operating	
Hydro Racer	Water Coaster	Xishuangbanna Sunac Land	China	2015	SBNO	
Typhoon Coaster	Water Coaster	Land of Legends Theme Park	Turkey	2016	Operating	
Flying Aces	Wing Coaster	Ferrari World Abu Dhabi	United Arab Emirates	2016	Operating	
Coaster Through the Clouds	Mega Coaster	Nanchang Sunac Land	China	2016	Operating	
Taron	Blitz Coaster	Phantasialand	Germany	2016	Operating	
Soaring with Dragon	Blitz Coaster	Hefei Sunac Land	China	2016	Operating	
Red Force	Blitz Coaster	Ferrari Land	Spain	2017	Operating	
Turbo Track; Formerly Vortex	Reverse Freefall Coaster	Ferrari World Abu Dhabi	United Arab Emirates	2017	Operating	
Wave Breaker: The Rescue Coaster	Family Launch Coaster	SeaWorld San Antonio	United States	2017	Operating	
DrageKongen	Suspended Family Coaster	Djurs Sommerland	Denmark	2017	Operating	
Velikoluksky Miasokombinat-2	Looping Coaster	Wonder Island	Russia	2017	Operating	
Light Speed	Mega-Lite	Visionland	China	2017	Operating	
Yukon Quad	Family Launch Coaster	Le Pal	France	2018	Operating	
Rex's Racer	Half Pipe Coaster	Shanghai Disneyland	China	2018	Operating	
Speed	Water Coaster	Energylandia	Poland	2018	Operating	
Hyperion	Mega Coaster	Energylandia	Poland	2018	Operating	
Steel Dolphin	Blitz Coaster	Shanghai Haichang Ocean Park	China	2018	Operating	
Fast And Furry-ous	Suspended Family Coaster	Warner Bros. World Abu Dhabi	United Arab Emirates	2018	Operating	
Unknown; Formerly Zaturn	Accelerator Coaster	Golden City; Space World	Russia	2018; 2006 to 2017	In storage	
Paradise Fall	Family Launch Coaster	Asia Park (Vietnam)	Vietnam	2018	Operating	
Unknown	Unknown	Chengdu Aviation Park	China	2018	In storage	
Highway Boat	Unknown	Asia Park (Vietnam)	Vietnam	2019	Closed	
Kereta Misteri	Family Launch Coaster	Dunia Fantasi	Indonesia	2019	Operating	
Lightspeed	Looping Coaster	Wonderland Eurasia	Turkey	2019	Closed	
Canavar Dalga	Family Launch Coaster	Wonderland Eurasia	Turkey	2019	Closed	
Dueling Dragons	Unknown	Guangzhou Sunac Land	China	2019	Operating	
Taiga	Blitz Coaster	Linnanmäki	Finland	2019	Operating	
Timmy's Half Pipe Havoc	Half Pipe Coaster	Nickelodeon Universe Theme Park inside the American Dream Meadowlands	United States	2019	Operating	
Hagrid's Magical Creatures Motorbike Adventure	Family Launch Coaster	Universal's Islands of Adventure	United States	2019	Operating	
Euro-Star	Suspended Looping Coaster	Anapa Park Jungle; Gorky Park	Russia	2019; 2008 to 2011	Operating	
Sandy's Blasting Bronco	Vertical LSM Coaster	Nickelodeon Universe Theme Park inside the American Dream Meadowlands	United States	2020	Operating	
Shred The Sewers	Blitz Coaster	Dream Island	Russia	2020	Operating	
Objectif Mars	Family Spinning Coaster	Futuroscope	France	2020	Operating	
Ipanema Skate Ride	Half Pipe Coaster	VinWonders	Vietnam	2020	Operating	
Vipère; Formerly Green Lantern: First Flight	Zac Spin	La Ronde; Six Flags Magic Mountain	Canada	2020; 2011 to 2019	Removed	
Legendary Twin Dragon	Impulse Coaster	Chongqing Wanda Theme Park	China	2021	Operating	
Kondaa	Mega Coaster	Walibi Belgium	Belgium	2021	Operating	
VelociCoaster	Blitz Coaster	Universal's Islands of Adventure	United States	2021	Operating	
Movie Park Studio Tour	Multidimensional Coaster	Movie Park Germany	Germany	2021	Operating	
Namazu	Family Launch Coaster	Vulcania	France	2021	Operating	
Light of Revenge	Blitz Coaster	Happy Valley Nanjing	China	2021	Operating	
Big Dipper	Hot Racer	Luna Park Sydney	Australia	2021	Operating	
Unknown	Blitz Coaster	Hayy Al Sharq Theme Park	Oman	2021	In Storage	
All Speeds	Blitz Coaster	Sunac Land Chengdu	China	2021	Operating	
Storm Coaster	Blitz Coaster	Dubai Hills Mall	United Arab Emirates	2022	Operating	
Pantheon	Blitz Coaster	Busch Gardens Williamsburg	United States	2022	Operating	
Sik	Looping Coaster	Flamingo Land; Movie Animation Park Studios; Hopi Hari	United Kingdom	2022	Operating	
Twister	Spinning Coaster	Hainan Ocean Paradise	China	2023	Operating	
Toutatis	Blitz Coaster	Parc Astérix	France	2023	Operating	
Arctic Rescue	Family Launch Coaster	SeaWorld San Diego	United States	2023	Operating	
DarKoaster	Family Launch Coaster	Busch Gardens Williamsburg	United States	2023	Operating	
Matugani; Formerly Kanonen	Accelerator Coaster	Lost Island Theme Park; Liseberg	United States	2023; 2005 to 2016	Operating	
Gotham City Escape	Blitz Coaster	Parque Warner Madrid	Spain	2023	Operating	
Manta	Blitz Coaster	SeaWorld Abu Dhabi	United Arab Emirates	2023	Operating	
Uncharted: The Enigma of Penitence	Multidimensional Coaster	PortAventura Park	Spain	2023	Operating	
Whale Breaking the Sky Roller Coaster	Looping Coaster	Fuli Ocean Happy World	China	2023	Operating	
Zokkon	Family Launch Coaster	Fuji-Q Highland	Japan	2023	Operating	
Mahuka	Hot Racer	Walibi Rhône-Alpes	France	2024	Operating	
The Flash: Speed Force; Formerly Surfrider	Half Pipe Coaster	Warner Bros. Movie World; Wet'n'Wild Water World	Australia	2024; 2007 to 2020	Operating	
Alghazal	Spinning Coaster	Meryal	Qatar	2024	Operating	
ThunderVolt; Formerly Senzafiato	Accelerator Coaster	Playland; Miragica	Canada	2024; 2009 to 2018	Operating	
Gold Rush	Lift and Launch Coaster	Drayton Manor Resort	United Kingdom	2024	Operating	
Georgia Gold Rusher	Ultra Surf Coaster	Six Flags Over Georgia	United States	2025	Operating	
Hiccup's Wing Gliders	Family Launch Coaster	Universal Epic Universe	United States	2025	Operating	
Spitfire	Blitz Coaster	Six Flags Qiddiya City	Saudi Arabia	2025	Operating	
Falcons Flight	Exa Coaster	Six Flags Qiddiya City	Saudi Arabia	2025	Operating	
Quantum Accelerator	Family Launch Coaster	Six Flags New England	United States	2026	Operating	
Inverse Time and Space Roller Coaster	Zac Spin	Silk Road Paradise	China	2026	Operating	
Unknown	Vertical Launch Coaster	Dream Island	Russia	2026	Under construction	
Unknown	Hot Racer	Dream Island	Russia	2026	Under construction	
Fast & Furious: Hollywood Drift	Spinning Launch Coaster	Universal Studios Hollywood	United States	2026	operating	
Fast & Furious: Hollywood Drift	Spinning Launch Coaster	Universal Studios Florida	United States	2027	Under construction	
Unknown; Formerly Lightning Bolt	Family Coaster	Granite Park; MGM Grand Adventures	United States	Unknown; 1993 to 2000	In Storage	
Unknown; Formerly Monte Makaya	Looping Coaster	Mirabilandia; Terra Encantada	Brazil	TBD; 1998 to 2010	In Storage	

== List of other attractions ==
=== Drop towers ===
Name	Model	Park	Country	Opened	Status	Ref
Space Probe; Formerly Space Probe 7	Giant Drop	Wonderland Sydney	Australia	1995	Removed	
Superman: Tower of Power; Formerly Hellevator	Giant Drop	Kentucky Kingdom	United States	1995	Removed	
Drop; Formerly The Drop; London's Scream Ride; The Pepsi Max Drop	Giant Drop	Sunny Park Luna Beach; Funland Hayling Island; London Trocadero	Bulgaria; United Kingdom	2019; 2004 to 2017; 1996 to 2000	Operating	
Drop Tower; Formerly Drop Zone Stunt Tower	Giant Drop	California's Great America	United States	1996	Operating	
Drop Tower; Formerly Drop Zone Stunt Tower	Giant Drop	Carowinds	United States	1996	Removed	
Voodoo Drop; Formerly Tower of Doom	Giant Drop	Six Flags America	United States	1996	Removed	
Drop Tower	Giant Drop	Canada's Wonderland	Canada	1997	Operating	
Giant Drop	Giant Drop	Six Flags Great America	United States	1997	Operating	
Giant Drop Meteor	Giant Drop	Hirakata Park	Japan	1997	Removed	
Pitt Fall	Giant Drop	Kennywood	United States	1997	Removed	
Superman: Tower of Power; Formerly Dungeon Drop	Giant Drop	Six Flags St. Louis; Six Flags AstroWorld	United States	2006; 1997 to 2006	Removed	
Tower of Doom	Giant Drop	Elitch Gardens	United States	1997	Operating	
Blue Fall	Giant Drop	Yokohama Hakkeijima Sea Paradise	Japan	1998	Removed	
Dalton Terror	Giant Drop	Walibi Belgium	Belgium	1998	Operating	
Fritt Fall	Giant Drop	Gröna Lund	Sweden	1998	Operating	
The Giant Drop	Giant Drop	Dreamworld	Australia	1998	Operating	
Gyro Drop	Gyro Drop	Lotte World	South Korea	1998	Operating	
Mystery Castle	Bungee Drop	Phantasialand	Germany	1998	Operating	
Space Vertigo	Giant Drop	Gardaland	Italy	1998	Operating	
Cabhum	Giant Drop	Terra Encantada	Brazil	1998	Removed	
Drop Tower; Formerly Drop Zone	Gyro Drop	Kings Island	United States	1999	Operating	
Le Voyage; Formerly La Tour Eiffel	Giant Drop	Hopi Hari	Brazil	1999	Removed	
Apocalypse	Giant Drop	Drayton Manor Resort	United Kingdom	2000	Removed	
El Vuelo del Fenix	Giant Drop	Terra Mítica	Spain	2000	Operating	
Acrophobia	Floorless Tilting Gyro Drop	Six Flags Over Georgia	United States	2001	Operating	
Hot Wheels Big Drop; Formerly Big Tower	Giant Drop	Beto Carrero World	Brazil	2002	Operating	
High Fall	Floorless Tilting Gyro Drop	Movie Park Germany	Germany	2002	Operating	
Drop Tower; Formerly Drop Zone	Ring Drop	Kings Dominion	United States	2003	Operating	
Scream	Gyro Drop	Heide-Park	Germany	2003	Operating	
Hurakan Condor	Giant Drop	PortAventura Park	Spain	2005	Operating	
AtmosFear	Ring Drop	Liseberg	Sweden	2011	Operating	
Lex Luthor: Drop of Doom	Giant Drop	Six Flags Magic Mountain	United States	2012	Operating	
Erawan	Giant Drop	Cinecittà World	Italy	2014	Operating	
Falcon's Fury	Sky Jump	Busch Gardens Tampa	United States	2014	Operating	
Zumanjaro: Drop of Doom	Giant Drop	Six Flags Great Adventure	United States	2014	Removed	
Golden Driller	Giant Drop	Fraispertuis City	France	2017	Operating	
Ikaros	Sky Jump	Gröna Lund	Sweden	2017	Operating	
Bungee Drop	Bungee Drop	Lotte World	South Korea	Unknown	Operating	
Sky Drop	Giant Drop	Canton Tower	China	Unknown	Operating	

=== Ferris wheels ===
All double and triple wheels listed below were manufactured by Waagner Biro AG and were supplied to the parks by Intamin.

Name	Model	Park	Country	Opened	Status	Ref
Giant Wheel	Double Wheel	Hersheypark	United States	1973	Removed	
Zodiac	Double Wheel	Wonderland Sydney; Kings Island	Australia	1989; 1975 to 1986	Removed	
Scorpion	Double Wheel	Parque de la Ciudad	Argentina	1982	Removed	
Double Wheel	Double Wheel	Kuwait Entertainment City	Kuwait	1984	Removed	
Sky Whirl	Triple Wheel	California's Great America	United States	1976	Removed	
Sky Whirl	Triple Wheel	Six Flags Great America	United States	1976	Removed	
Tree Triple Wheel	Triple Wheel	Seibuen Amusement Park	Japan	1985	Removed	
Hydra	Triple Wheel	Lotte World	South Korea	1989	Removed	

=== Flume rides ===
Commonly known as Flume ride, Intamin refers to these rides as Flume Ride or Reversing Boat Ride.

Name	Model	Park	Country	Opened	Status	Ref
Wild Water Slide	Flume Ride	Bobbejaanland	Belgium	1980	Operating	
Flume Ride	Flume Ride	Al-Rawdah Sharaco Amusement Park	Saudi Arabia	1986	Removed	
Sissibo Sizzler Flume Ride; Formerly Cariboo Log Chute	Flume Ride	Upper Clements Theme Park; Expo 86	Canada	1989; 1986 to 1988	Removed	
Aguas Turbulentas Hidrovertigo	Flume Ride	Parque de la Ciudad	Argentina	1987	Closed	
Flume Ride	Flume Ride	Lotte World	South Korea	1989	Operating	
Autosplash	Flume Ride	Mirabilandia	Italy	1992	Operating	
Terra Magma; Formerly Indiana River	Flume Ride	Bobbejaanland	Belgium	1992	Operating	
Flume Ride	Flume Ride	Taejŏn Expo '93 (now Kumdori Land)	South Korea	1993	Removed	
Over the Edge	Flume Ride	MGM Grand Adventures Theme Park	United States	1993	Removed	
Mighty Mountain Flume Adventure	Flume Ride	Leofoo Village Theme Park	Taiwan	1995	Operating	
Horacic Park	Flume Ride	Parque da Mônica	Brazil	1996	Operating	
Unknown	Flume Ride	Gero Land	Egypt	1996	Operating	
Skull Mountain	Flume Ride	Six Flags America	United States	1997	Removed	
Valhalla	Flume Ride	Blackpool Pleasure Beach	United Kingdom	2000	Operating	
Dschungel X-pedition	Flume Ride	Legoland Deutschland	Germany	2002	Operating	
Rio Bravo	Flume Ride	Parque Warner Madrid	Spain	2002	Operating	
Shoot the Rapids	Flume Ride	Cedar Point	United States	2010	Removed	
The Big Splash	Flume Ride	Rainbow Springs	New Zealand	2012	Operating	
Chiapas	Flume Ride	Phantasialand	Germany	2014	Operating	
Biberburg	Flume Ride	Familypark	Austria	2022	Operating	
Catapult Falls	Flume Ride	SeaWorld San Antonio	United States	2024	Operating	

=== Freefall rides ===
Name	Model	Park	Country	Opened	Status	Ref
Demon Drop	Freefall	Dorney Park & Wildwater Kingdom; Cedar Point	United States	2010; 1983 to 2009	Operating	
Freefall	Freefall	Six Flags Magic Mountain	United States	1982	Removed	
Freefall	Freefall	Six Flags Over Georgia	United States	1983	Removed	
Free Fall	Freefall	Nagashima Spa Land	Japan	1983	Operating	
Free Fall	Freefall	Rusutsu Resort	Japan	Unknown	Operating	
Free Fall - Torre do Terror	Freefall	Beto Carrero World	Brazil	1997	Removed	
Free Fall	Freefall	Central Park	Japan	Unknown	Operating	
Free Fall	Freefall	Tokyo Sommerland	Japan	Unknown	Closed	
Hollywood Action Tower; Formerly Drop of Doom	Freefall	Movieland Park; Galaxyland, West Edmonton Mall	Italy	2006; 1985 to 2002	Operating	
Mr Hyde's Nasty Fall; Formerly Freefall; Formerly The Edge	Freefall	Geauga Lake; Rocky Point Amusement Park; Six Flags Great America	United States	1996; 1987 to 1995; 1983 to 1986	Removed	
Stuntman's Freefall	Freefall	Six Flags Great Adventure	United States	1983	Removed	
Sky Screamer	Freefall	Six Flags AstroWorld	United States	1983	Removed	
Texas Cliffhanger	Freefall	Six Flags Over Texas	United States	1982	Imploded	
The Edge	Freefall	California's Great America	United States	1983	Removed	

=== Observation towers ===
Gyro towers similar to those listed below that were built prior to 1971 did not involve Intamin and therefore should not be listed here. Well-known rides such as Cedar Point's Space Spiral, AstroWorld's Astroneedle and Coney's Space Tower were built by Willy Bühler Space Towers Company of Berne, Switzerland, with cabins by Von Roll. In 1971 Intamin started marketing these towers and contracted these same companies to build them. Willy Bühler Space Towers was eventually acquired by Von Roll.

Name	Model	Park	Country	Opened	Status	Ref
Eiffel Tower	Elevator	Kings Dominion	United States	1975	Operating	
Eiffel Tower	Elevator	Kings Island	United States	1972	Operating	
Flying Island	Flying Island	Gardaland	Italy	2000	Operating	
Gatlinburg Space Needle	Compact	Gatlinburg, Tennessee	United States	1971	Operating	
Island in the Sky	Flying Island	Legoland Florida	United States	1983	Closed	
Oil Derrick	Elevator	Six Flags Over Texas	United States	1969	Operating	
Pagode	Flying Island	Efteling	Netherlands	1986	Operating	
Sky Tower	Elevator	Six Flags Magic Mountain	United States	1971	SBNO	
Torre Espacial	Space Tower	Parque de la Ciudad	Argentina	1985	Operating	
Unknown	Flying Island	Ankara City Park	Turkey	2016	Operating	
Unknown	Flying Island	Ayameike Amusement Park	Japan	1989	Removed	
Unknown	Flying Island	Expo '90	Japan	1990	Unknown	
Unknown	Flying Island	Happy Valley Chengdu	China	2009	Operating	
Unknown	Flying Island	Happy Valley Shanghai	China	2009	Operating	
Island Fuji	Flying Island	Nabana no Sato; Nagashima Spa Land	Japan	2005; 1990 to 2004	Operating	
Unknown	Flying Island	Nanchang Wanda Park	China	2016	Operating	
Unknown	Flying Island	Seibuen Park	Japan	1996	Removed	

==== Gyro towers ====
Name	Model	Park	Country	Opened	Status	Ref
Panoraama	Gyro 800	Linnanmäki	Finland	1986	Operating	
Skyscraper	Gyro 1000	Geauga Lake	United States	1974	Removed	
Space Tower	Gyro 1000	Blackpool Pleasure Beach	United Kingdom	1974	Removed	
Sky Spiral	Gyro 1000	Aquarena Springs	United States	1979	Removed	
Euro-Tower	Gyro 1000	Europa-Park; Floriade 1982; German National Garden Show Kassel; Grun 80 (Horticultural Exhibit)	Germany	1983; 1982; 1981; 1980	Operating	
Lego Top	Gyro 1000	Legoland Billund	Denmark	1984	Operating	
Unknown	Gyro 1000	Takarazuka Family Land	Japan	1984	Closed	
Panorama	Gyro 1000	Heide Park	Germany	1985	Operating	
Unknown	Gyro 1000	Rhyl; Glasgow Garden Festival	United Kingdom	1993; 1987 to 1992	Converted to a decorative beacon	
Unknown	Gyro 1000	Rhuddlan	United Kingdom	1988	Unknown	
Panoramic	Gyro 1000	Meli Park; Floriade 1992; German National Garden Show Frankfurt	Belgium	1993; 1992; 1989	Removed	
Needle	Gyro 1000	Lion Country Safari	United States	1980s		Unknown
Observation Tower	Gyro 1000	Legoland Deutschland	Germany	2002	Operating	
Carolina Skytower	Gyro 1200	Carowinds	United States	1973	Operating	
Observation Tower	Gyro 1200	Kingdoms 3	United States	1974	Closed	
Kissing Tower	Gyro 1200	Hersheypark	United States	1975	Operating	
Sky Cabin	Parachute Gyro 1200	Knott's Berry Farm	United States	1976	Operating	
Sky Trek Tower	Gyro 1200	Six Flags Great America	United States	1977	Operating	
Star Tower	Gyro 1200	California's Great America	United States	1979	Operating	
Space Needle	Gyro 1200	Kuwait Entertainment City	Kuwait	1984	Operating	
Unknown	Parachute Gyro 1200	Expo 86	Canada	1986	Unknown	
Unknown	Gyro 1200	Seibuen Park	Japan	1986	Operating	
Infinnito	Gyro 1200	Terra Mitica	Spain	2007	Operating	
Top 'O Texas Tower	Gyro 1300	State Fair of Texas	United States	2013	Operating	
La Gyrotour	Gyro 1500	Futuroscope	France	1989	Operating	
Unknown	Gyro 1500	Heide Park	Germany	1991	Converted; Now known as Scream	
Unknown	Gyro 1500	Hangzhou Paradise	China	2006	Closed	
Unknown	Children Gyro Tower	M/S Dripco	(United Arab Emirates) UAE	1984	Unknown	
Observation Tower	Super Gyro	Legoland Malaysia	Malaysia	2012	Operating	

=== River rapids rides ===
Name	Model	Park	Country	Opened	Status	Ref
ACME Rápidos	River Rapids	Parque Warner Madrid	Spain	2002	Operating	
Alpin Rafting	River Rapids	Ravensburger Spieleland	Germany	2006	Operating	
Aqua Ride	River Rapids	Yokohama Hakkeijima Sea Paradise	Japan	1992	Operating	
Amazonia	River Rapids	Bellewaerde	Belgium	2024	Operating	
Beaver Rafting	River Rapids	BonBon-Land	Denmark	1998	Operating	
Calico River Rapids; Formerly Bigfoot Rapids	River Rapids	Knott's Berry Farm	United States	1988	Operating	
Canyon River Rapids	River Rapids	Hersheypark	United States	1987	Removed	
Congo River Rapids	River Rapids	Alton Towers	United Kingdom	1986	Operating	
Congo River Rapids	River Rapids	Busch Gardens Tampa	United States	1982	Operating	
Congo Rapids	River Rapids	Six Flags Great Adventure	United States	1981	Operating	
Çılgın Nehir	River Rapids	Vialand	Turkey	2013	Operating	
Dòng sông thử thách	River Rapids	Dragon Park Ha Long	Vietnam	2017	Operating	
Donnerfluss	River Rapids	Plopsaland Deutschland	Germany	1984	Operating	
Drakkar	River Rapids	Rainbow Magicland	Italy	2011	Operating	
Excalibur - Secrets of the Dark Forest; Formerly Mystery River; Formerly Neverending Story	River Rapids	Movie Park Germany	Germany	1996	Operating	
Fjord-Rafting	River Rapids	Europa Park	Germany	1991	Operating	
Fury of the Nile	River Rapids	Worlds of Fun	United States	1984	Operating	
Gold River	River Rapids	Walibi Rhône-Alpes	France	1989 (Note: Soquet revamps later this ride.)	Operating	
Grand Canyon Rapids	River Rapids	PortAventura Park	Spain	1995	Operating	
Grand Canyon Rapids	River Rapids	MGM Grand Adventures Theme Park	United States	1993	Removed	
Grand Rapids	River Rapids	Michigan's Adventure	United States	2006	Operating	
Grizzly River Rampage	River Rapids	Opryland USA	United States	1982	Removed	
Grizzly River Run	River Rapids	Disney California Adventure	United States	2001	Operating	
Grizzly Run	River Rapids	Six Flags Darien Lake	United States	1989	Operating	
Hurjakuru	River Rapids	Linnanmäki	Finland	1998	Operating	
Infinity Falls	River Rapids	SeaWorld Orlando	United States	2018	Operating	
Jungle Adventure	River Rapids	Lotte World	South Korea	1989	Operating	
Jungle Rapids	River Rapids	Gardaland	Italy	1999	Operating	
Kali River Rapids	River Rapids	Disney's Animal Kingdom	United States	1999	Operating	
Kallerado Rafting	River Rapids	Liseberg	Sweden	1997	Operating	
Koskiseikkailu	River Rapids	Särkänniemi	Finland	1999	Operating	
Mountain Rafting	River Rapids	Heide-Park	Germany	1992	Operating	
Piraña	River Rapids	Efteling	Netherlands	1983	Operating	
Radja River	River Rapids	Walibi Belgium	Belgium	1988	Operating	
Radja River	River Rapids	Walibi Sud-Ouest	France	1992	Operating	
Rampaging Rapids	River Rapids	Hunt's Pier	United States	1985	Removed	
Raging Rapids	River Rapids	Kennywood	United States	1985	Operating	
Raging River	River Rapids	Adventureland	United States	1983	Operating	
Rapid River Ride	River Rapids	Dream Park	Egypt	1998	Operating	
Rapidos de Argos	River Rapids	Terra Mítica	Spain	2000	Operating	
Rapidos del Orinoco	River Rapids	Isla Mágica	Spain	1997	Operating	
Rapids Ride Journey	River Rapids	Ocean Park Hong Kong	China	2011	Operating	
Rattlesnake Rapids	River Rapids	Lagoon Amusement Park	United States	1997	Operating	
Rio Bravo	River Rapids	Mirabilandia	Italy	1992	Operating	
Rio Loco	River Rapids	SeaWorld San Antonio	United States	1988	Operating	
Rip Roaring Rapids	River Rapids	Carowinds	United States	1982	Removed	
Rip Roaring Rapids	River Rapids	California's Great America	United States	1988	Operating	
Roaring Rapids	River Rapids	Six Flags Great America	United States	1984	Temporarily Closed	
Roaring Rapids	River Rapids	Six Flags Magic Mountain	United States	1981	Operating	
Roaring Rapids	River Rapids	Six Flags Over Texas	United States	1983	Operating	
Roman Rapids	River Rapids	Busch Gardens Williamsburg	United States	1988	Operating	
Romus et Rapidus	River Rapids	Parc Astérix	France	1989	Operating	
Rumba Rapids	River Rapids	Thorpe Park	United Kingdom	1987	Permanently closed	
Shipwreck Rapids	River Rapids	SeaWorld San Diego	United States	1999	Operating	
Snowy River Rampage	River Rapids	Wonderland Sydney	Australia	1985	Removed	
The Adventure Cove River Rapids; Splash Canyon 1993-2017	River Rapids	Drayton Manor	United Kingdom	1993/2021	Operating	
The Gully Washer	River Rapids	Six Flags Fiesta Texas	United States	1992	Operating	
Thunder Canyon	River Rapids	Cedar Point	United States	1986	Operating	
Thunder River	River Rapids	Six Flags Over Georgia	United States	1982	Operating	
Thunder River	River Rapids	Six Flags St. Louis	United States	1983	Operating	
Thunder River	River Rapids	Six Flags AstroWorld	United States	1980	Removed	
Vikings' River Splash	River Rapids	Legoland Billund	Denmark	2006	Operating	
White Water Canyon	River Rapids	Canada's Wonderland	Canada	1984	Operating	
White Water Canyon	River Rapids	Kings Dominion	United States	1985	Operating	
White Water Canyon	River Rapids	Kings Island	United States	1985	Operating	
Raging River	River Rapids	Great Escape	United States	1986	Operating	

=== Shoot the chute rides ===
Commonly known as Shoot the Chute, Intamin refers to these rides as Spillwater, Super Splash, Mega Splash or Hyper Splash.

Name arachutep	Model	Park	Country	Opened	Status	Ref
Bermuda Triangle - Alien Encounter	Spillwater	Movie Park Germany	Germany	1996	Operating	
Congo Falls	Spillwater	Kings Island	United States	1988	Operating	
Diamond Falls	Spillwater	Kings Dominion	United States	1985	Removed	
Drenched	Mega Splash	Oakwood Theme Park	United Kingdom	2002	Removed	
Escape from Pompeii	Spillwater	Busch Gardens Williamsburg	United States	1996	Operating	
Fuga da Atlantide	Super Splash	Gardaland	Italy	2003	Operating	
Iguazu	Spillwater	Isla Mágica	Spain	1997	Operating	
Jungle Splash	Spillwater	Etnaland	Italy	2010	Operating	
La Furia de Triton	Spillwater	Terra Mítica	Spain	2000	Operating	
Las Caratas Salvajes	Spillwater	Parque Warner Madrid	Spain	2002	Operating	
Le Grand Splatch	Spillwater	Parc Astérix	France	1989	Operating	
Le Splash	Spillwater	La Ronde	Canada	2004	Operating	
Los Fiordos Vikingos	Spillwater	Madrid's Theme Park	Spain	1998	Operating	
Mega Tsunami	Spillwater	China Dinosaurs Park	China	2011	Operating	
Monsoon	Spillwater	Worlds of Fun	United States	1992	Operating	
Monsoon Falls	Spillwater	Six Flags Discovery Kingdom	United States	1998	Operating	
Old Mill Scream	Spillwater	Opryland USA	United States	1987	Removed	
Perilous Plunge	Mega Splash	Knott's Berry Farm	United States	2000	Removed	
Giraffica; Formerly Pilgrims Plunge	Hyper Splash	Holiday World & Splashin' Safari	United States	2009	Removed	
Power Surge	Spillwater	Six Flags Fiesta Texas	United States	1992	Removed	
Shipwreck Falls	Spillwater	Six Flags Darien Lake	United States	2002	Operating	
Splash Boat	Spillwater	Dream Park	Egypt	1998	Operating	
Thác hải tượng	Spillwater	Dragon Park Ha Long	Vietnam	2017	Operating	
Tidal Wave	Spillwater	Six Flags Magic Mountain	United States	1989	Closed	
Tsunami	Spillwater	Fantasilandia	Chile	2007	Operating	
Tutuki splash	Spillwater	PortAventura Park	Spain	1995	Operating	
Viking	Spillwater	Vialand	Turkey	2013	Operating	
Whitewater Falls	Spillwater	California's Great America	United States	1990	Operating	
Yucatán	Spillwater	Rainbow Magicland	Italy	2011	Operating	
Unknown	Spillwater	Space World	Japan	1990	Removed	

=== Other rides ===
Name	Model	Park	Country	Opened	Status	Ref
Frozen Ever After	Dark Boat Ride	Hong Kong Disneyland	China	2023	Operating	
Frozen Ever After	Dark Boat Ride	Disney Adventure World	France	2026	Operating	
Anna and Elsa's Frozen Journey	Dark Boat Ride	Tokyo Disney Sea	Japan	2024	Operating	
ACME Rock n' Rocket	Looping Starship	Six Flags Over Texas	United States	2006	Removed	
Adventures of Sindbad	Water Dark Ride	Lotte World	South Korea	1989	Operating	
Aerovarvet	Looping Starship	Liseberg	Sweden	1989	Removed	
Aviktas	Giant Gyro Swing	Pleasure Beach Resort	United Kingdom	2026	Operating	
Back to the Future: The Ride	Dynamic Motion Simulator	Universal Studios Florida	United States	1991	Removed	
Back to the Future: The Ride	Dynamic Motion Simulator	Universal Studios Hollywood	United States	1993	Removed	
Back to the Future: The Ride	Dynamic Motion Simulator	Universal Studios Japan	Japan	2001	Removed	
The Simpsons Ride	Dynamic Motion Simulator	Universal Studios Florida	United States	2008	Operating	
The Simpsons Ride	Dynamic Motion Simulator	Universal Studios Hollywood	United States	2008	Operating	
Berserker	Looping Starship	Kings Dominion	United States	1984	Operating	
Sambesi Bootsfahrt	Tow Boat Ride	Hanover Zoo	Germany	2000	Operating	
Bounty; Formerly Bateau Ivre	Looping Starship	Walibi Belgium; Zygofolis	Belgium	1992; 1987 to 1991	Removed	
Pirate's Revenge; Formerly Bounty's Revenge	Looping Starship	Sunway Lagoon; Wonderland Sydney	Malaysia	2005; 1985 to 2004	Operating	
Cinéma Dynamique	Dynamic Motion Simulator	Futuroscope	France	1988	Closed	
Danse Macabre	Dynamic Motion Stage	Efteling	Netherlands	2024	Operating	
Dragonwatch	Children Parachute Tower	Toverland	Netherlands	2023	Operating	
Derren Brown's Ghost Train	VR Dark Ride	Thorpe Park	United Kingdom	2016	Operating	
Despicable Me: Minion Mayhem	Maxi Motion Simulator	Universal Studios Florida	United States	2012	Operating	
Despicable Me: Minion Mayhem	Maxi Motion Simulator	Universal Studios Hollywood	United States	2014	Operating	
Despicable Me: Minion Mayhem	Maxi Motion Simulator	Universal Studios Japan	Japan	2017	Operating	
Dynamic Theatre	Dynamic Motion Theatre	Lotte World	South Korea	1989?	Operating	
Dinosaur	EMV	Disney's Animal Kingdom	United States	1998	Operating	
Du thuyền nhiệt đới	Tow Boat Ride	Dragon Park Ha Long	Vietnam	2017	Operating	
E.T. Adventure	Dark Ride	Universal Studios Florida	United States	1990	Operating	
E.T. Adventure	Dark Ride	Universal Studios Hollywood	United States	1991	Removed	
E.T. Adventure	Dark Ride	Universal Studios Japan	Japan	2001	Removed	
Épidemaïs Croisières	Tow Boat Ride	Parc Astérix	France	1989	Operating	
Fata Morgana	Tow Boat Ride	Efteling	Netherlands	1986	Operating	
Fatih’s Dream	Tow Boat Ride	Vialand	Turkey	2014	Operating	
Flying Dutchman	Flying Dutchman	Worlds of Fun	United States	1973	Operating	
Goliath	Gyro Swing	Adventure World	Australia	2017	Operating	
Galleon's Graveyard	Flying Dutchman	Wonderland Sydney	Australia	Unknown	Removed	
Gold River Adventure	Tow Boat Ride	Walibi Belgium	Belgium	1978	Operating	
Gondoletta	Tow Boat Ride	Efteling	Netherlands	1981	Operating	
Gondoletta	Tow Boat Ride	Luisenpark	Germany	1975	Operating	
Gondwanaland - Gamanile River	Tow Boat Ride	Leipzig Zoological Garden	Germany	2011	Operating	
Great Gasp	Parachute 1200	Six Flags Over Georgia	United States	1976	Removed	
Great Six Flags Air Racer	Barnstormer	Six Flags Over Georgia	United States	1984	Removed	
Great Six Flags Air Racer	Barnstormer	Six Flags Over Texas	United States	1984	Removed	
Gyro Swing	Gyro Swing	Lotte World	South Korea	2001	Operating	
H.M.B. Endeavor	Looping Starship	California's Great America	United States	1987	Removed	
Holandes Volador	Flying Dutchman	Parque de la Ciudad	Argentina	1984	Removed	
Hollywood Tour	Water Dark Ride	Phantasialand	Germany	1990	Operating	
I Corsari	Water Dark Ride	Gardaland	Italy	1992	Operating	
Kastel di Lendas	Water Dark Ride	Hopi Hari	Brazil	1997?	Operating	
Levitoscope	Levitoscope	Futuroscope	France	1988	Closed	
Ice Age Adventure; Formerly Looney Tunes Adventure	Water Dark Ride	Movie Park Germany	Germany	1996	Removed	
It's a Small World	Water Dark Ride	Disneyland Paris	France	1992	Operating	
Jaws	Dark Boat Ride	Universal Studios Florida	United States	1990	Removed	
Jet Scream	Looping Starship	Canada's Wonderland	Canada	1990	Removed	
Jigu Maul (Global Village)	Water Dark Ride	Everland	South Korea	1985	Operating	
Jimmy Neutron's Nicktoon Blast	Maxi Motion Simulator	Universal Studios Florida	United States	2003	Removed	
Jumpin' Jellyfish	Children Parachute Tower	Disney California Adventure Park	United States	2001	Operating	
Jumpin' Jellyfish	Children Parachute Tower	Tokyo DisneySea	Japan	2001	Operating	
Jungle Mission	Tow Boat Ride	Bellewaerde	Belgium	1978	Operating	
King Claw	Giant Gyro Swing	Dreamworld	Australia	2025	Operating	
Marconi Express	Monorail	Bologna	Italy	Unknown	Operating	
Frozen Ever After formerly Maelstrom	Water Dark Ride	Epcot	United States	2016; 1988 to 2014	Operating	
Maelstrom	Gyro Swing	Drayton Manor	United Kingdom	2002	Operating	
Minik Kaşifler	Water Dark Ride	Vialand	Turkey	2013	Operating	
Monorail	Monorail	E-DA World	Taiwan	Unknown	Operating	
Lazy River Boat Trip	Tow Boat Ride	Chester Zoo	United Kingdom	2015	Operating	
Le Pays des Contes de Fées	Tow Boat Ride	Disneyland Paris	France	1994	Operating	
Looping Starship	Looping Starship	Six Flags AstroWorld	United States	1986	Removed	
Looping Starship	Looping Starship	Six Flags Over Georgia	United States	1985	Removed	
Looping Starship	Looping Starship	Valleyfair	United States	1985	Removed	
Looping Starship	Looping Starship	Yomiuriland	Japan	1993?	Unknown	
Looping Starship	Looping Starship	Tokyo Summerland	Japan	1986?	Removed	
Looping Starship	Looping Starship	Expo 86	Canada	1986	Removed	
Loke	Giant Gyro Swing	Liseberg	Sweden	2017	Operating	
Parachute Training Center: Edwards AFB Jump Tower; Formerly Sky Chuter	Parachute 1200	Six Flags Great Adventure; Six Flags St. Louis	United States	1983; 1978 to 1982	Removed	
Pavillon de la Vienne	Maxi Motion Seat 2	Futuroscope	France	1994	Operating	
Paysages d’Europe	Tow Boat Ride	Futuroscope	France	1992	Removed	
Perilous Pendulum	Looping Starship	Galaxyland	Canada	1985	Removed	
Pharaoh's Fury	EMV	Lotte World	South Korea	Unknown	Operating	
Phoenix	Looping Starship	Busch Gardens Tampa	United States	1984	Closed	
Peter Pan's Flight	Dark Ride	Disneyland Paris	France	1992	Operating	
Pirates of the Caribbean	Water Dark Ride	Disneyland Paris	France	1992	Operating	
Pirate's Revenge; Formerly Bounty's Revenge	Looping Starship	Sunway Lagoon; Wonderland Sydney	Malaysia	2005; 1985 to 2004	Operating	
Power Dive	Looping Starship	Six Flags Great America	United States	1987	Removed	
Prairie Shooner	Swinging Pirate Ship	Frontier City	United States	1984	Operating	
Sesame Street Spaghetti Space Chase	Dark Ride	Universal Studios Singapore	Singapore	2013	Operating	
Silent Move	Monorail	Fort Fun Abenteuerland	Germany	1994	Removed	
Simulador Virtual	Dynamic Motion Simulator	Parque de Atracciones de Madrid	Spain	1996?	Operating	
Sky Flower	Parachute 1200	Tokyo Dome City	Japan	1978	Removed	
Sky Jump	Parachute 1200	Knott's Berry Farm	United States	1976	Removed	
Sky Hawk	Flight Trainer	California's Great America	United States	1976		
Slinky Dog Spin	Caterpillar Ride	Hong Kong Disneyland	China	2011	Operating	
Slinky Dog Zigzag Spin	Caterpillar Ride	Walt Disney Studios Park	France	2010	Operating	
Snagglepuss' Parachute School; Formerly Huckleberry's Parachutes; Formerly Huck's Parachutes; Formerly Captain Skyhook	Parachute Tower	Kings Dominion	United States	1980	Removed	
Southern Star	Looping Starship	Carowinds	United States	1986	Closed	
Space Shuttle	Looping Starship	Six Flags Great Adventure	United States	1985	Removed	
Space Shuttle	Looping Starship	Nagashima Spa Land	Japan	1994?	Removed	
Space Shuttle America	Dynamic Motion Simulator	Six Flags Great America	United States	1994	Removed	
Star Tours	Motion Simulator	Disneyland Paris	France	1992	Operating	
Sultan’s Adventure Ride	EMV	Leofoo Village Theme Park	Taiwan	2000	Operating	
Swan Boats	Tow Boat Ride	Alton Towers	United Kingdom	1987	Removed	
Templo de Kinetos	Maxi Motion Seat 4	Terra Mítica	Spain	2000	Operating	
Texas Chute Out	Parachute 1200	Six Flags Over Texas	United States	1976	Removed	
The Bounty	Swinging Pirate Ship	Drayton Manor Theme Park	United Kingdom	2007	Operating	
The Funtastic World of Hanna-Barbera	Maxi Motion Simulator	Universal Studios Florida	United States	1990	Removed	
The Spectucalar 4D Adventure	Dynamic Motion Theatre	Gardaland	Italy	1990	Operating	
The Claw	Gyro Swing	Dreamworld	Australia	2004	Removed	
Tigeren	Gyro Swing	Djurs Sommerland	Denmark	2019	Operating	
Tom Sawyer Raft Ride	Tow Boat Ride	Blackpool Pleasure Beach	United Kingdom	1974	Removed	
Top Gun; Formerly Flight Commander	Flight Trainer	Flamingo Land; Kings Island	United Kingdom	1996; 1990 to 1995	Removed	
Tow Boat	Tow Boat Ride	Dream Park	Egypt	1998	Operating	
Toy Soldier Parachute Drop	Children Parachute Tower	Hong Kong Disneyland	China	2011	Operating	
Toy Soldiers Parachute Drop	Children Parachute Tower	Walt Disney Studios Park	France	2010	Operating	
Silent Move	Monorail	Fort Fun Abenteuerland	Germany	1994	Removed	
Window of the World Monorail	Monorail	Window of the World	China	1993	Operating	
Viking Fury	Super Bounty	Kings Island	United States	1982	Operating	
XK-1	Flight Trainer	Knott's Berry Farm	United States	1989	Removed	
Z-Force	Looping Starship	Six Flags Magic Mountain	United States	1987	Removed	
Jet Set	Mini Jets	Six Flags Over Texas	United States	1967	Removed	
Unknown	Barnstormer	Lotte World	South Korea	1986	Removed	
Unknown	Barnstormer	Seibuen Amusement Park	Japan	1976	Removed	
Unknown	Maxi Motion Seat 4	Geroland	Egypt	1997	Unknown	
Unknown	Tow Boat Ride	Familienpark Sottrum	Germany	1983?	Removed	
Unknown	Tow Boat Ride	Adventure Island, Rohini	India	2007?	Unknown	
Unknown	Tow Boat Ride	Worlds of Wonder	India	2007?	Unknown	
Unknown	Looping Starship	Takarazuka Family Land	Japan	1992?	Removed	
Unknown	Looping Starship	Green Expo	Japan	1990	Removed	
Unknown	Looping Starship	Seibuen Amusement Park	Japan	1988?	Removed	
Unknown	Children Parachute Tower	M/S Dripco	(United Arab Emirates) UAE	1984	Unknown	
Unknown	Children Parachute Tower	Al-Rawdah Sharaco Amusement Park	Saudi Arabia	1988	Removed	

== See also ==
- Category:Amusement rides manufactured by Intamin
- Category:Roller coasters manufactured by Intamin
- Category:Water rides manufactured by Intamin
