= Cavallino (disambiguation) =

Cavallino may refer to:

- Bernardo Cavallino, an Italian Baroque painter
- Cavallino, an Italian town in the Province of Lecce
- Cavallino-Treporti, an Italian town in the Province of Veneto
- Cavallino, the Italian word for "little horse"
- Cavallino, the name of a magazine devoted to Ferrari, which is known as the "Prancing Horse" (il Cavallino Rampante)
- Cavallino, a composition by Brian Eno, found at the end of his album, The Shutov Assembly
