= Clássicos do Cinema - Turma da Mônica =

Series of comic books

- Cover of the first issue focusing on the Horacic Park story.

Publication information
- Publisher: Panini Comics
- Format: Ongoing series
- Genre: Humor/comedy
- Publication date: 2007–2020
- No. of issues: 70

Creative team
- Created by: Mauricio de Sousa

Clássicos do Cinema - Turma da Mônica was a Brazilian series of comic books created by Mauricio de Sousa and published by Panini Comics between 2007 and 2020. The series follows the characters of Monica and Friends, who themselves play characters from popular films, such as Jurassic Park, Star Wars, Batman Forever, The Terminator, etc. These parodies focused on comedy with a high use of pop references. Most of the issues had new stories, but some were older stories published in other comic books related to the issue's theme film. Starting in April 2007, the series was initially bi-monthly, but since August 2014, it became quarterly.

The title initially began as a spiritual successor to Gibizão da Turma da Mônica, which was published quarterly between 1996 and 2001 by Editora Globo, who republished some stories that were based on films. The stories published in Gibizão were satires of films, classic literary works, and other themes. The title became popular enough that in 1997, the magazine won the Prêmio Angelo Agostini for "best launch", and the Troféu HQ Mix for "best editorial project".

== Issues ==
Each issue is known for featuring stories centered around different blockbuster films. Two original stories that included continuity were Horacic Park, being an adaptation of the Jurassic Park trilogy, and Coelhada nas Estrelas, adapting the Star Wars saga.

=== Horacic Park ===
The first Horacic Park story was originally published in October 1993 in issue #82 of the Mônica comic book published by Globo. It was an adaptation of the first Jurassic Park film and was later republished in February 1997 in issue #5 of Gibizão, and again in April 2007 in the first issue of Clássicos do Cinema. In later editions, new stories were created adapting the two subsequent films in the trilogy. All stories feature crossovers between Monica and Friends and Horacio's World.

In the first story, Mauricio de Sousa finds a way to bring the dinosaurs back to life with the help of Franklin by creating a technology capable of turning his dinosaur drawings into real dinosaurs. Mauricio decides to create a dinosaur park on an island known as Solar and invites Monica, Jimmy Five, Smudge, and Maggy to visit the island. However, they are surprised by Captain Fray who has taken over the studio with the help of a Tyrannosaurus rex, intending to use the technology to dominate the world using the dinosaurs. His plans are ruined with the help of Franklin, who finds a way to turn Horacio into a giant, scaring Captain Fray's T-Rex sidekick. Mauricio then decides to give up on making a dinosaur park and changes his plan to create a park for Monica.

The continuation of the story was released in the following edition of Clássicos do Cinema under the title "Imundo Perdido: Horacic Park" (The Lost Dirty One: Horacic Park), being an adaptation of The Lost World: Jurassic Park. In the second story, the characters decide to take a vacation on the neighboring island known as Morna. They are then attacked by a Compy, which kidnaps Smudge and takes him to Captain Fray. Captain Fray transforms Horacio into an adult evil T-Rex, who kidnaps Mauricio and then flees to the city. Monica and her friends try to stop Horacio's attack, but Captain Fray reappears. He tries to eliminate Monica and her friends with a laser gun, but seeing his friends in danger, Horacio recovers his memories. He defeats Captain Fray and returns to normal.

The story ended in February 2009 in issue #12, making a reference to Jurassic Park III. In the third story, the characters return to Solar Island to take a vacation, now accompanied by Junior. However, Mauricio and Junior get separated and end up on Morna Island. Monica and her friends decide to go to the island to look for them. Upon arriving on the island, they discover that Captain Fray and the Sewer Creatures have transformed into dinosaurs due to a failure while using Franklin's machine. Now in the form of a Spinosaurus, Captain Fray tries to capture Mauricio and his friends, but Franklin uses a weapon to reverse the transformation and turn him back to normal.

The name Horacic Park along with the logo were also used for a ride at the Parque da Mônica theme park.
