= Flying Aces (roller coaster) =

Roller coaster at Ferrari World

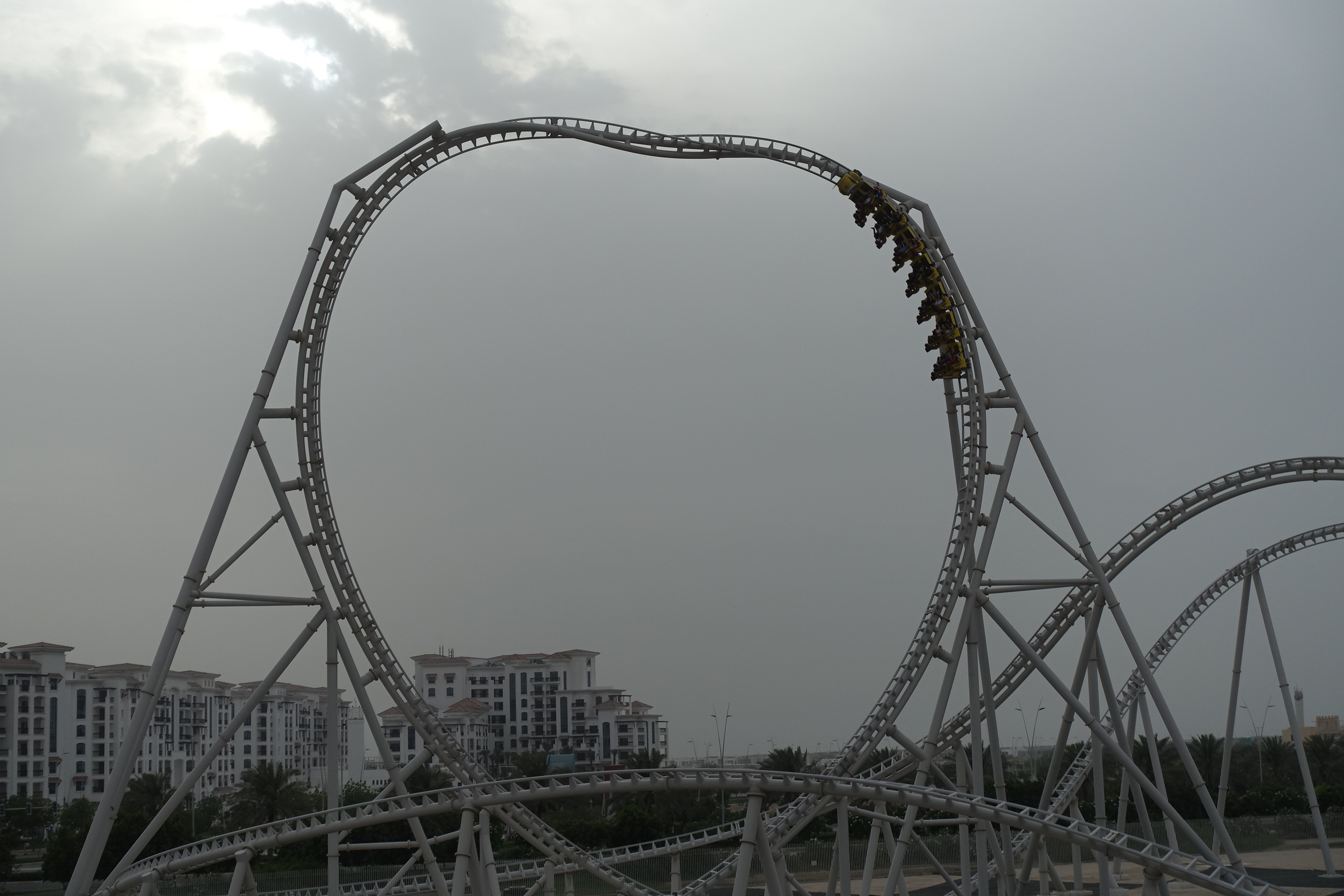
- Flying Aces traveling through its non-inverting loop

Ferrari World Abu Dhabi
- Location: Ferrari World Abu Dhabi
- Coordinates: 24.4841°N 54.6044°E
- Status: Operating
- Opening date: 24 February 2016

General statistics
- Type: Steel
- Manufacturer: Intamin
- Model: Wing Coaster (Intamin)
- Lift/launch system: Cable lift hill
- Height: 63 m (207 ft)
- Length: 1,500 m (4,921 ft)
- Speed: 120 km/h (75 mph)
- Inversions: 1
- Capacity: 1,008 riders per hour
- G-force: 5
- Height restriction: 130 cm (4 ft 3 in)
- Trains: 2 trains with 7 cars. Riders are arranged 4 across in a single row for a total of 28 riders per train.
- Flying Aces at RCDB

Flying Aces is a steel roller coaster at Ferrari World in Abu Dhabi, United Arab Emirates. It was manufactured by Intamin and opened on 24 February 2016. It is the second Wing Coaster manufactured by Intamin and reaches a height of 63 metres (207 ft), has a maximum speed of 120 kilometres per hour (75 mph), and features 1,500 metres (4,921 ft) of track. For safety reasons, the ride has a height restriction (130–196 cm) in place.

== Characteristics ==
Flying Aces is themed after Francesco Baracca, an Italian flying ace who was the designer and first user of Ferrari's logo, the Prancing Horse. Its queue depicts scenes of World War I air combat, and includes a hangar, barracks, training camp, and projected mural of airplanes flying in the sky. The ride's trains are made to look like biplanes.

=== Ride experience ===
Immediately upon leaving the station, riders begin to ascend the 63-metre (207 ft) cable lift hill at an angle of 51 degrees and a speed of 30 kilometres per hour (19 mph). The train then descends the main drop, reaching a maximum speed of 120 kilometres per hour (75 mph). Immediately after the drop, the train then turns right and enters a 52-metre (171 ft) non-inverting loop. The train then travels through several banked turns and hills before entering a heartline roll near the end of the ride. Shortly after the heartline roll, the train enters the final brake run.

=== Trains ===
The trains used on Flying Aces feature seven rows, each seating four riders. This makes for a total capacity of 28 riders per train. Flying Aces is the second Wing Coaster by Intamin, following Skyrush at Hersheypark.

== See also ==
- 2016 in amusement parks
- List of Intamin rides
- Skyrush, another Intamin coaster with similar trains
