= Prancing Horse =

Logo of Ferrari

The Prancing Horse logo, used by Ferrari in various guises since 1932.

The logo of the performance carmaker Ferrari is the Prancing Horse (Italian: Cavallino Rampante, lit. 'prancing little horse'), a prancing black horse on a yellow background. The design was created by Francesco Baracca, an Italian flying ace during World War I, as a symbol to be displayed on his aeroplane; the Baracca family later permitted Enzo Ferrari to use the design. The logo has been used by Scuderia Ferrari—Ferrari's racing team, subsidiary, and immediate predecessor—since 1932 and was applied to the company's sports cars beginning in 1947.

== Description ==
The Prancing Horse is generally presented in one of two ways: either as a shield, with the Italian tricolour above the horse and the initials SF ("Scuderia Ferrari") below; or as a rectangle, replacing "SF" with the word "Ferrari". The shield variant of the logo, sometimes found on the fenders of Ferrari road cars, is strongly associated with Ferrari's racing activities. The rectangular version of the design has been in use, alongside the shield, since 1947; no major changes to the logo have occurred since then.

Francesco Baracca's original design is different from the version used by Ferrari. It uses a white background and features a downturned tail, among other differences. The upward-facing tail of Ferrari's later version is anatomically incorrect—a horse cannot raise its tail while on its hind legs.

The horse is sometimes interpreted as rearing rather than prancing.

The two major variants of the logo:
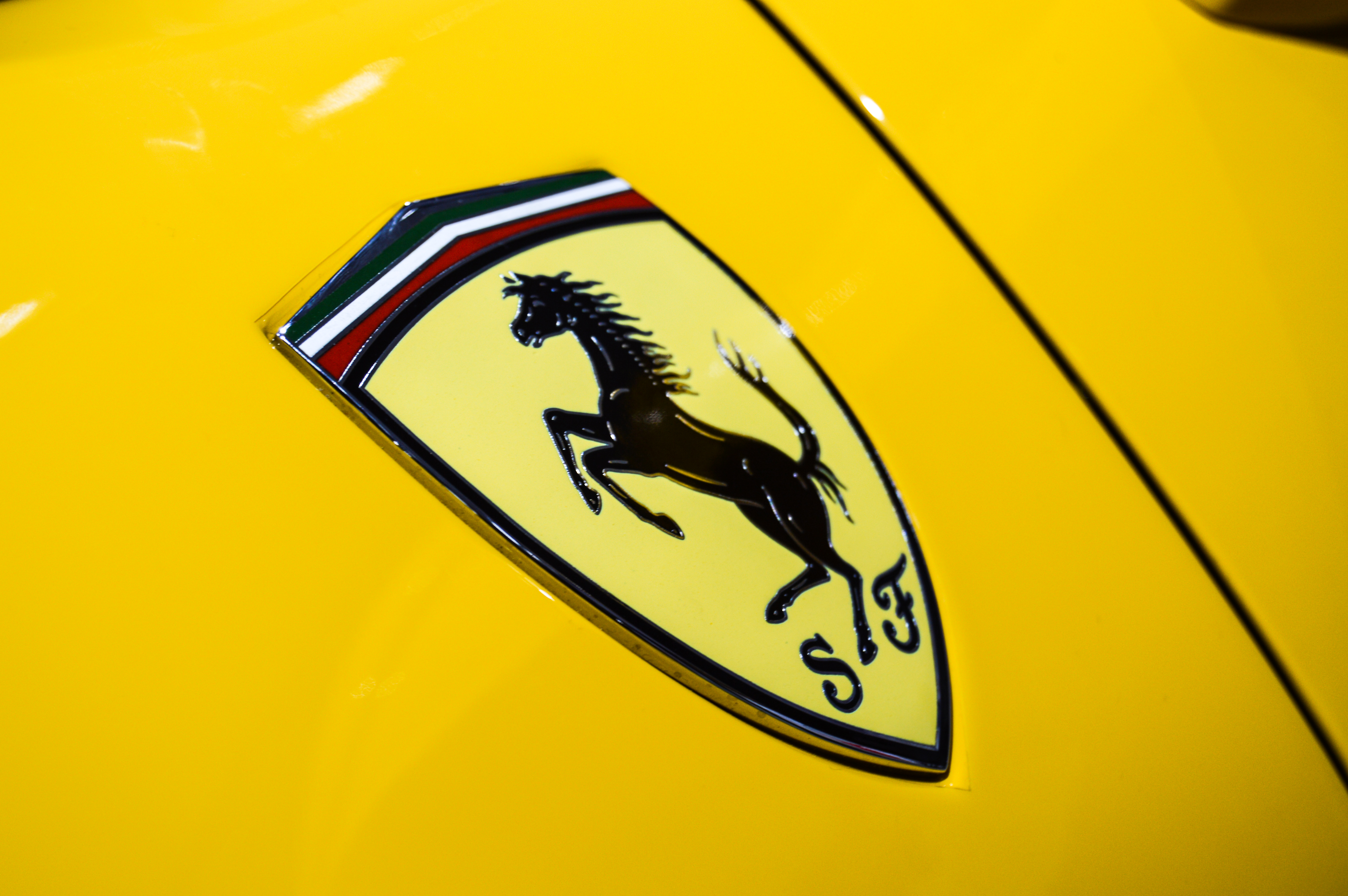
A shield-shaped logo on a Ferrari 488 GTB.

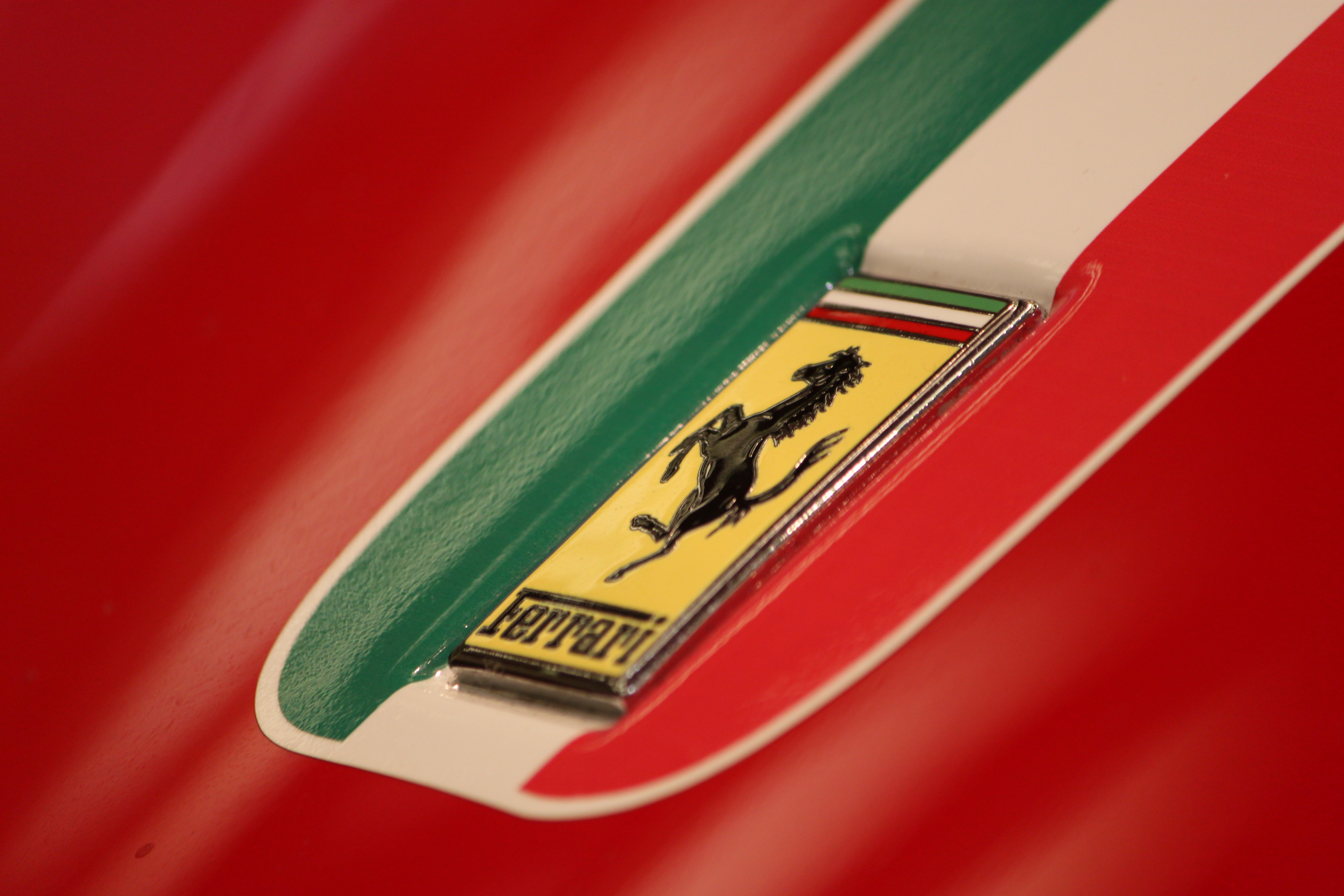
A rectangular logo on a Ferrari 599XX.

== History ==
=== Use by Francesco Baracca ===
Francesco Baracca, a highly successful Italian flying ace, first used the Prancing Horse in 1917, when his squadron permitted its aviators to apply personal symbols to their aeroplanes. In a letter to his mother dated 27 April 1918, he claimed to have adopted the horse in tribute to a cavalry regiment he once belonged to, which had used a similar symbol since 1692. The regiment's horse symbol was coloured silver, but Baracca changed it to black so that it would stand out more on his plane's fuselage.

Many variations of the story circulate, including claims that the horse stems from Baracca's equestrian hobby, that it references a specific stallion he owned, or that it was originally red, only painted black after Baracca's death in an act of mourning by his squadron mates. Based on a painted panel which existed before the pilot's death, the Museo Francesco Baracca asserts that the horse was black during his lifetime. One version of the story claims that the emblem originated as a kill mark applied after Baracca shot down a German pilot from Stuttgart, a city whose coat of arms depicts a similar horse. If true, this would make the Prancing Horse distantly related to the horse found on Porsche's logo, itself derived from the arms of Stuttgart. Though this claim is plausible—it was common at the time for aces to paint an opponent's coat of arms on their planes—it does not appear to have any supporting evidence, and the Museo Francesco Baracca holds no documents that support the idea.

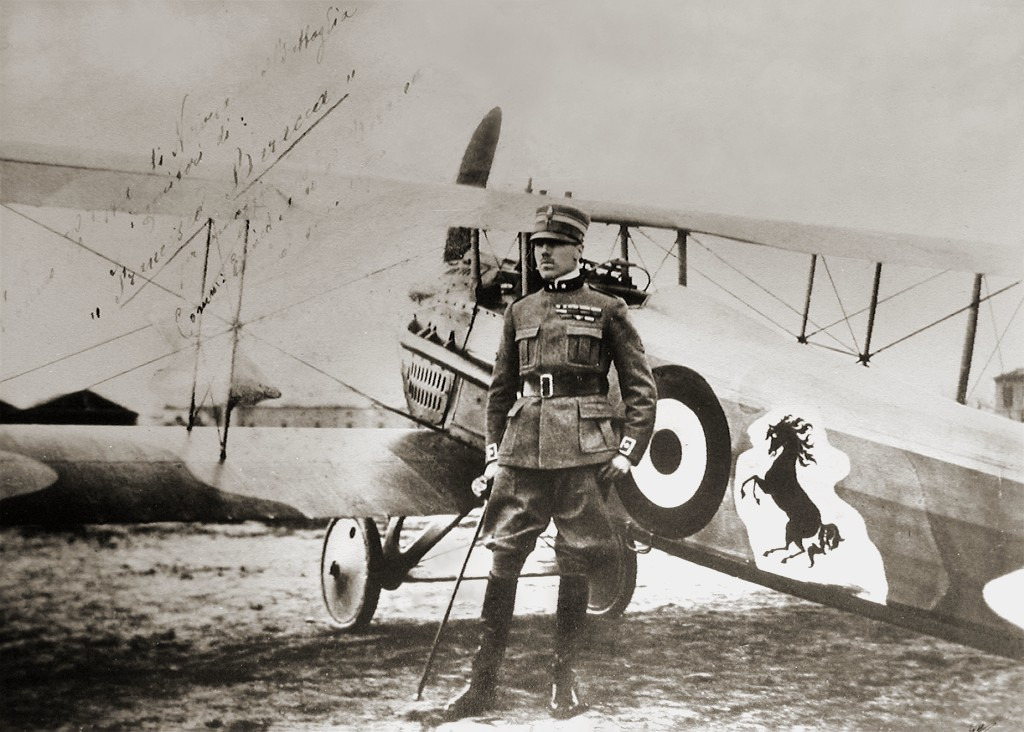
Francesco Baracca, originator of the Prancing Horse. His original design is displayed to his right, painted on the side of his SPAD S.XIII aeroplane.

After his death, Baracca was hailed as a war hero, and the Prancing Horse was used in material related to him. The Baracca family incorporated the symbol into their coat of arms, and one pamphlet from 1929 rendered it in a manner remarkably similar to Ferrari's later design, with a shield and an upturned tail. Eligio Gerosa, who would later redesign the horse for Ferrari, also made a rendition for a Baracca-related organisation.

=== Adoption by Ferrari ===
In his autobiography, Enzo Ferrari offered an account of how he acquired permission to use the design. In 1923, after winning the Circuto del Savio Grand Prix near Ravenna, he was approached and befriended by the Baracca family, who had attended the race as spectators. Paolina Biancoli, Francesco's mother, suggested that Enzo adopt the horse as a good luck charm. Enzo accepted the request, and in 1932—nine years later—the Prancing Horse was adopted by his new racing team, Scuderia Ferrari. The team made several adjustments to its design including adding the Italian tricolour, changing the position of the horse's legs and tail, and placing it inside a canary yellow shield—the "colour of Modena," Enzo's hometown. Its first applications were to the team's stationery, a motorcycle entered at the Circuito di Pontedera, and the car entered for the 24 Hours of Spa-Francorchamps.

Enzo was on good terms with the Baraccas, patrons of the Alfa Romeo dealer where he worked, and they considered each other friends. However, it is unknown exactly why the Baracca family permitted him to use the symbol. Many explanations focus on their intersecting life experiences: these include Francesco's studies at the Military Academy of Modena and Enzo's older brother having volunteered for Baracca's squadron's ground crew. Enzo's rationale for adopting the design was based around a personal admiration for Baracca dating to his adolescence, as well as his love of La cavalla storna, a poem written by Giovanni Pascoli.

Ferrari's adoption of the Prancing Horse was concordant with the cultural landscape of Fascist Italy, which, drawing from the Futurist art movement, idolised speed, machinery, and military sacrifice. Baracca's activities during World War I were mythologised by the Italian right wing, and things associated with him were positively received by the general public. Ferrari's use of the symbol, among other things, allowed it to establish an image that appealed to populist political values; this would later help it procure military contracts during World War II.

=== Second design and contemporary use ===
In 1945, Enzo sought a new emblem for his nascent car manufacturing business. He worked closely with Eligio Gerosa, an engraver from Milan, to redesign the Prancing Horse to his liking. Enzo's preferences substantially shaped the look of the design: for example, he directed Gerosa to avoid curves because they "reminded him of Bugatti grilles," and specified that the horse should always face left. The new logo, which was rectangular in shape, debuted in 1947 alongside the Ferrari 125 S.

After World War II, Ferrari denied involvement with fascism and downplayed the symbol's connection to Baracca, choosing instead to focus on its association with the company's racing heritage. Within general consciousness, this re-orientation effectively obliterated Baracca's connection to the Prancing Horse. Today, the Prancing Horse is almost exclusively associated with Ferrari: it forms a central part of Ferrari's brand, and elicits a strong devotion from the company's fans, the tifosi.

In the town of Maranello, where Ferrari is headquartered, there is a stainless steel statue of the Prancing Horse; it was created in 2003 by the Albanian contemporary artist Helidon Xhixha. The world's largest Prancing Horse logo, measuring 65 m (213 ft) in length and having an area of 3,000 m^{2} (32,000 sq ft), is located on the roof of Ferrari World Abu Dhabi, an amusement park in the United Arab Emirates. The park also houses two roller coasters that take inspiration from the logo: Flying Aces, which is based on the wartime exploits of Francesco Baracca, and Mission Ferrari, which features a character named "Agent Cavallino."

== Other users ==
The North American Racing Team, which was closely associated with Ferrari, used a modified version of the Prancing Horse: the American flag was above the horse, while the team's initials were below.

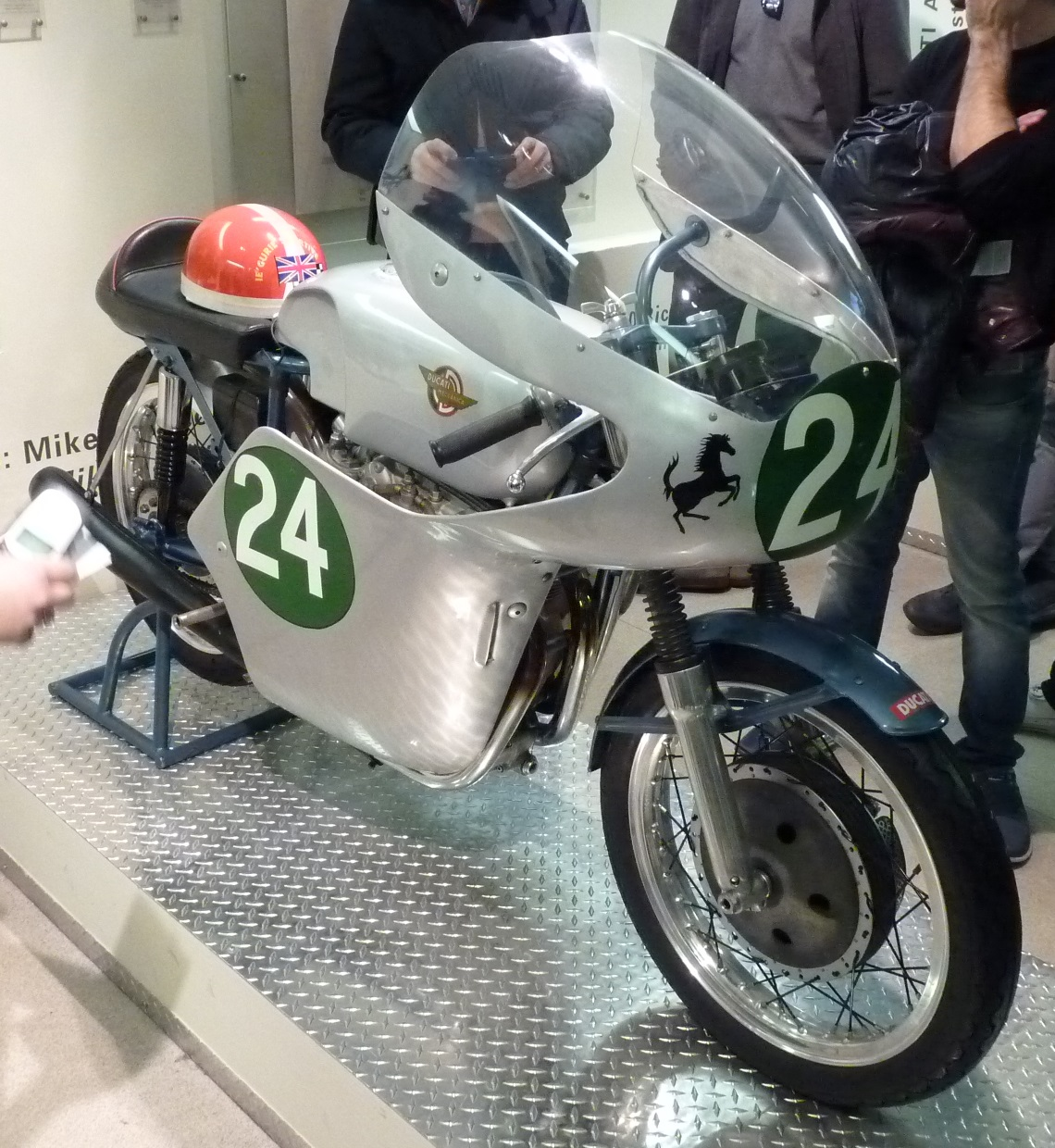
Taglioni's horse on the front of a Ducati racing motorcycle.

Fabio Taglioni, an influential engineer within Ducati, applied the same emblem to many of his motorcycles. Similar to Ferrari, he did this in tribute to Francesco Baracca: Taglioni's father had fought alongside the ace in World War I, and the two families remained in friendship with one another afterwards. As Taglioni rose in prominence within Ducati, Francesco's mother, the same woman who permitted Enzo to use the horse, also allowed him to do so. Rather than using Baracca's original horse, Taglioni elected to use the redesigned version created by Ferrari. Ducati stopped using the emblem after 1961.

=== Similar logos ===
Steinwinter, a specialty carmaker from Germany, used a prancing horse logo similar to Ferrari's. Like Porsche, the logo is derived from Stuttgart's coat of arms.

A "prancing moose" emblem imitating the Ferrari logo is popular among Volvo enthusiasts. According to Dave Barton, the emblem's creator, the design was inspired by a Volvo marketing campaign that featured the moose test. Barton has also produced similar moose designs copying the Porsche and Lamborghini logos.

== In popular culture ==
Cavallino, a Ferrari enthusiast magazine, derives its name from the logo.

The band Jamiroquai featured the logo, augmented with their own "Buffalo Man" logo, on the cover of their 1996 album Travelling Without Moving.

== See also ==
- Identity of Ferrari
