= Window of the World Monorail =

Monorail line in Shenzhen, China

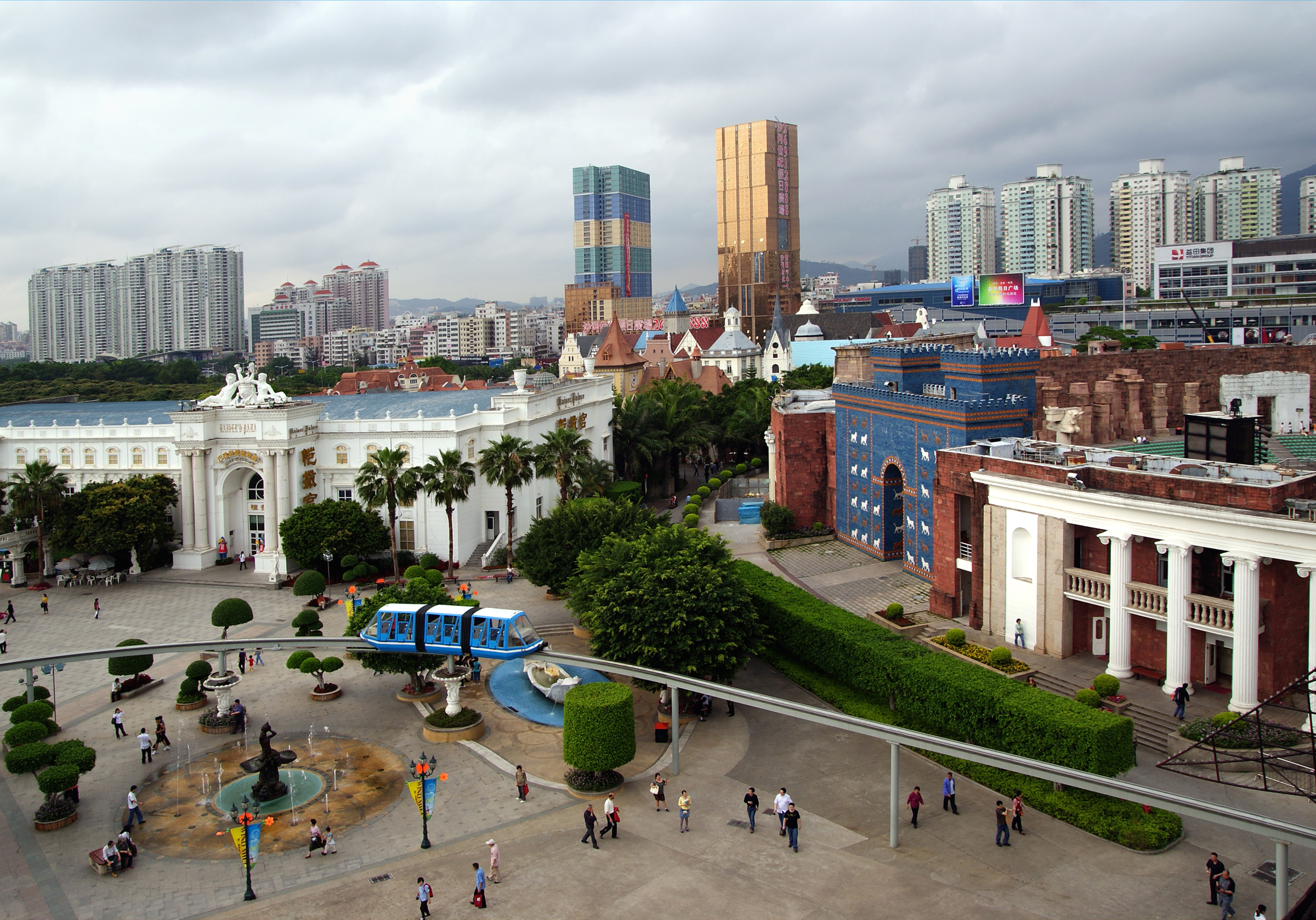
- Window of the World Theme park with three car monorail in view.

Overview
- Locale: Window of the World
- Transit type: monorail
- Number of lines: 1
- Number of stations: 3

Operation
- Began operation: 1993
- Number of vehicles: 8

Technical
- System length: 1.7 km (1.06 mi)

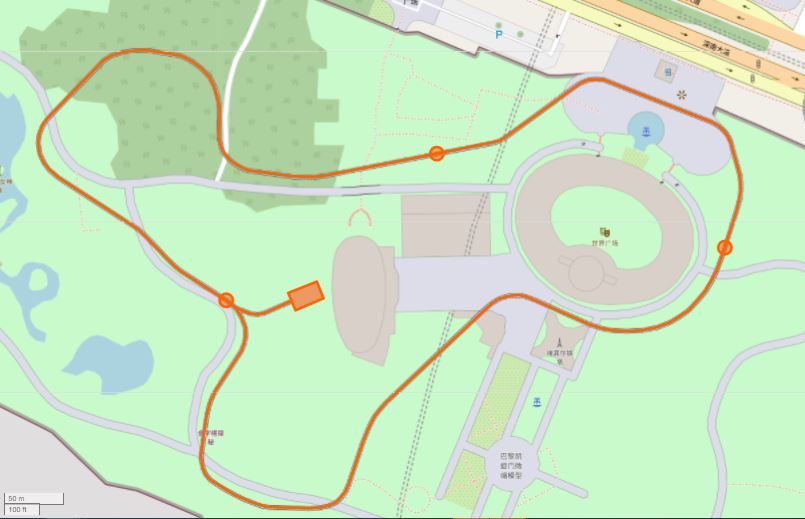
Windows On The World (Shenzhen) Monorail route map

The Window of the World Monorail was a monorail that transports passengers around the Window of the World, which is a theme park located in Shenzhen, Guangdong, China. It ran three-car trains carrying 18 passengers. Built by Intamin, the line's success led to the city of Shenzhen building its own, larger version, the Happy Line.
