= Looping Starship =

Amusement ride

- Phoenix at Busch Gardens Tampa Bay, a custom Looping Starship ride
- Status: Discontinued
- First manufactured: 1984
- No. of installations: 14
- Manufacturer: Intamin
- Height: 14.6 m (48 ft)
- Capacity: 650 riders per hour
- Duration: approximately 3 minutes and 33 seconds ride time

The Looping Starship is an amusement ride manufactured by Intamin of Switzerland. The ride is a swinging ship that can spin a complete 360-degree revolution. The ride has been modified with custom theming to resemble a number of different vehicles, including a Space Shuttle, a fighter jet, an Egyptian cargo ship, and a Looney Tunes ACME Rocket.

The Looping Starship is manufactured either as a traveling model or a park model. Most parks require riders to be at least 48 inches (1.2 m) tall.

== Locations ==
=== Existing ===
Name	Park	Year opened	Notes
Looping Starship	Yomiuriland	1992	(Themed after a space shuttle)
Pirate's Revenge	Sunway Lagoon	2005	This ride was the former Bounty's Revenge at Wonderland Sydney, which operated from 1985 to 2004.
Space Shuttle	Nagashima Spa Land	1992	(Themed after a space shuttle)

=== Removed ===
Name	Park	Year opened	Year closed	Notes
Power Dive	Six Flags Great America	1987	2001	(Themed after a fighter jet. Removed due to maintenance issues)
Looping Starship	Six Flags Over Georgia	1989	2005	(Removed to make way for Goliath)
Z-Force	Six Flags Magic Mountain	1987	1993	(Removed to make way for Batman: The Ride)
Space Shuttle	Six Flags AstroWorld	1986	2005	(Removed due to park's closure, and relocated to Six Flags Over Texas)
Space Shuttle	Six Flags Great Adventure	1985	2007	(Removed as a result of cost-cutting, and currently in storage)
Aerovarvet	Liseberg	1989	2002	(Was rebuilt in the winter between 2001-2002 to a swinging ship ride)
Perilous Pendulum	Galaxyland	1985	2003	(The first indoor Looping Starship, but removed for replacement by the Solar Flare ride)
Jet Scream	Canada's Wonderland	1990	2010	Removed for WindSeeker. As of August 2011, put up for sale
Bounty	Walibi Belgium	1992	2002	(The former "Bateau Ivre" at fr:Zygofolis in France, which operated from 1987 to 1991)
ACME Rock n' Rocket	Six Flags Over Texas	2006	2014	(Most of the ride's parts are from the Six Flags Astroworld Looping Starship, which operated from 1986 to 2005. An entirely new chassis was built for its installation, and themed after a Looney Tunes ACME rocket for Justice League: Battle for Metropolis.)
Looping Starship	Tokyo Summerland	1986	2007	(Themed as a Space Shuttle)
Looping Starship	Seibuen Yuenchi	1988	2011	(Themed as a Space Shuttle)
Looping Starship	Expo 86, Vancouver BC	1986	1986	(It was themed as a Space Shuttle, in place during the summer run of the world's fair in 1986, and presumably sold when the fair closed.)
H.M.B. Endeavor	California's Great America	1987	2017	(Themed after a pirate ship, formerly called The Revolution, and removed mid-off-season due to maintenance issues, low ridership and South Bay Shores.)
Looping Starship	Takarazuka Family Land	1991	2003	
Looping Starship	Parque Grano de Oro	2012	2017	(Themed as a Space Shuttle, formerly Jet Scream at Canada's Wonderland -- which operated from 1990 to 2010)
Phoenix	Busch Gardens Tampa Bay	1984	2018	(Themed after an Egyptian cargo vessel) Demolished in December 2022.
Looping Starship	Valleyfair	1985	2019	(Themed after a pirate ship.)
Southern Star	Carowinds	1986	2022	(Themed after a viking ship, formerly called Frenzoid)
Berserker	Kings Dominion	1984	2025	(Themed after a Viking ship)
