= Dream Island (amusement park) =

Amusement park in Moscow, Russia

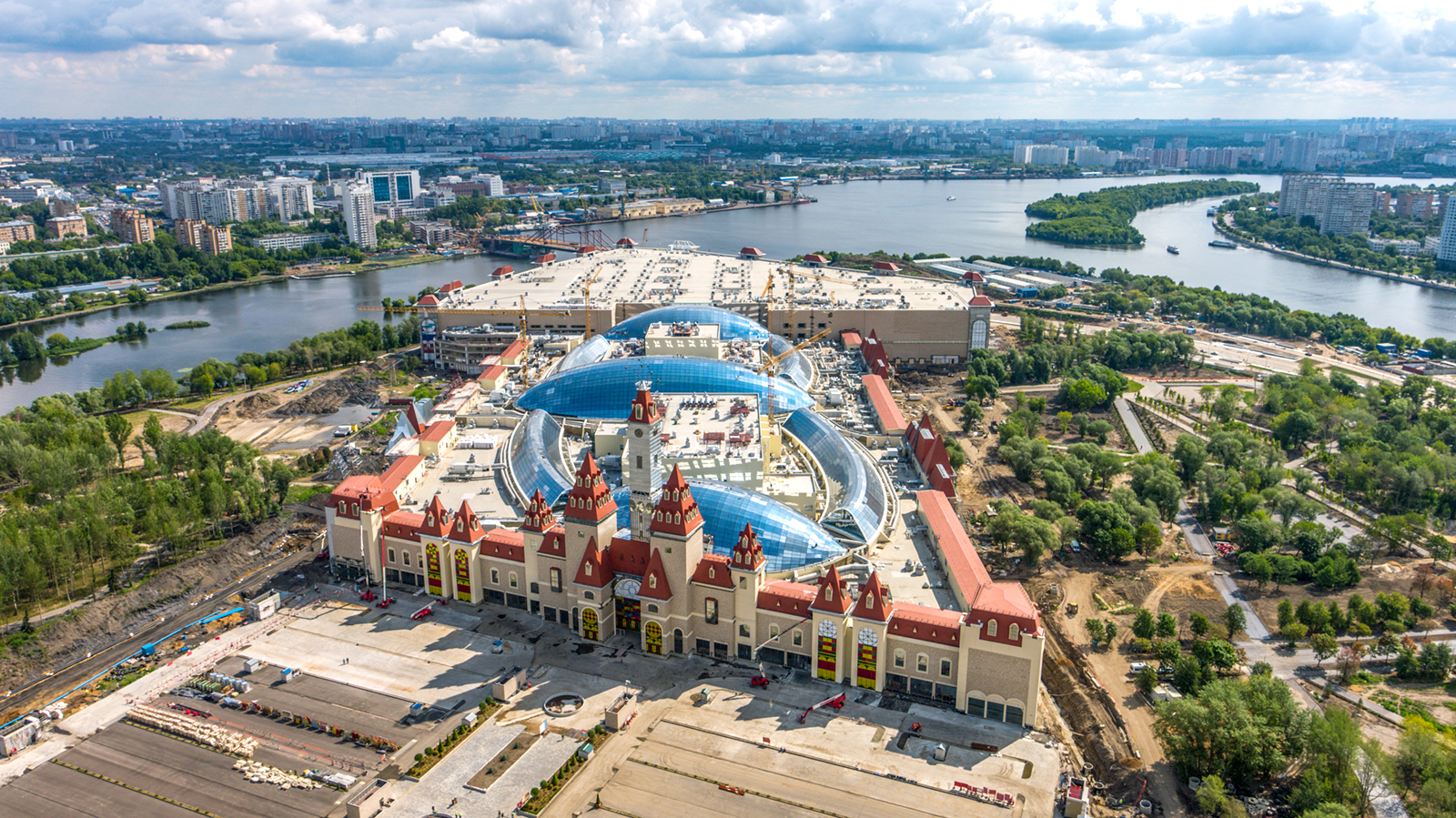
- Interactive map of Dream Island
- Location: Andropov Avenue, Nagatinskaya Poima, Moscow, Russia
- Coordinates: 55.695050°N 37.676692°E
- Status: Operating
- Opened: 29 February 2020; 6 years ago
- Theme: Fairy tales, Hello Kitty, The Smurfs, Hotel Transylvania, Teenage Mutant Ninja Turtles and Soyuzmultfilm characters
- Operating season: Year-round
- Website: https://dreamisland.ru/

Dream Island (Russian: Остров мечты; Ostrov mechty) is an amusement park in Moscow that opened 29 February 2020. It is the largest indoor theme park in Europe.

The park is located in the Nagatinskaya Poima, in the Nagatinsky Zaton district of Moscow's Southern Administrative Okrug.

== Development ==
The total development area covers about 100 hectares, with the main building occupying 300,000 square meters. The main facade of Dream Island is styled as a fairytale castle with towers and stained glass. The central tower stands 75 meters tall.

The project was developed by the company Regions, with investments totaling $1.5 billion, and VTB Bank provided a loan of 37 billion rubles. Construction of the park began in March 2016. It was halted in early 2017 for financial reasons but was re-financed and restarted by late 2017.

There are nine themed zones, including Hotel Transylvania licensed from Sony Pictures, the Smurfs, licensed from Belgian company IMPS, Teenage Mutant Ninja Turtles from Paramount, and Hello Kitty from Sanrio of Japan.

There are promenades resembling the streets of world capitals and famous cities, including Rome, with the Colosseum in miniature; Barcelona with Gaudi's buildings; and London. The park's 72 acres are covered by Europe's largest glass dome, to allow operation during Moscow's winters.

The cost of entrance for a family of four at the opening of the park is 11,000 rubles, or about US$142.

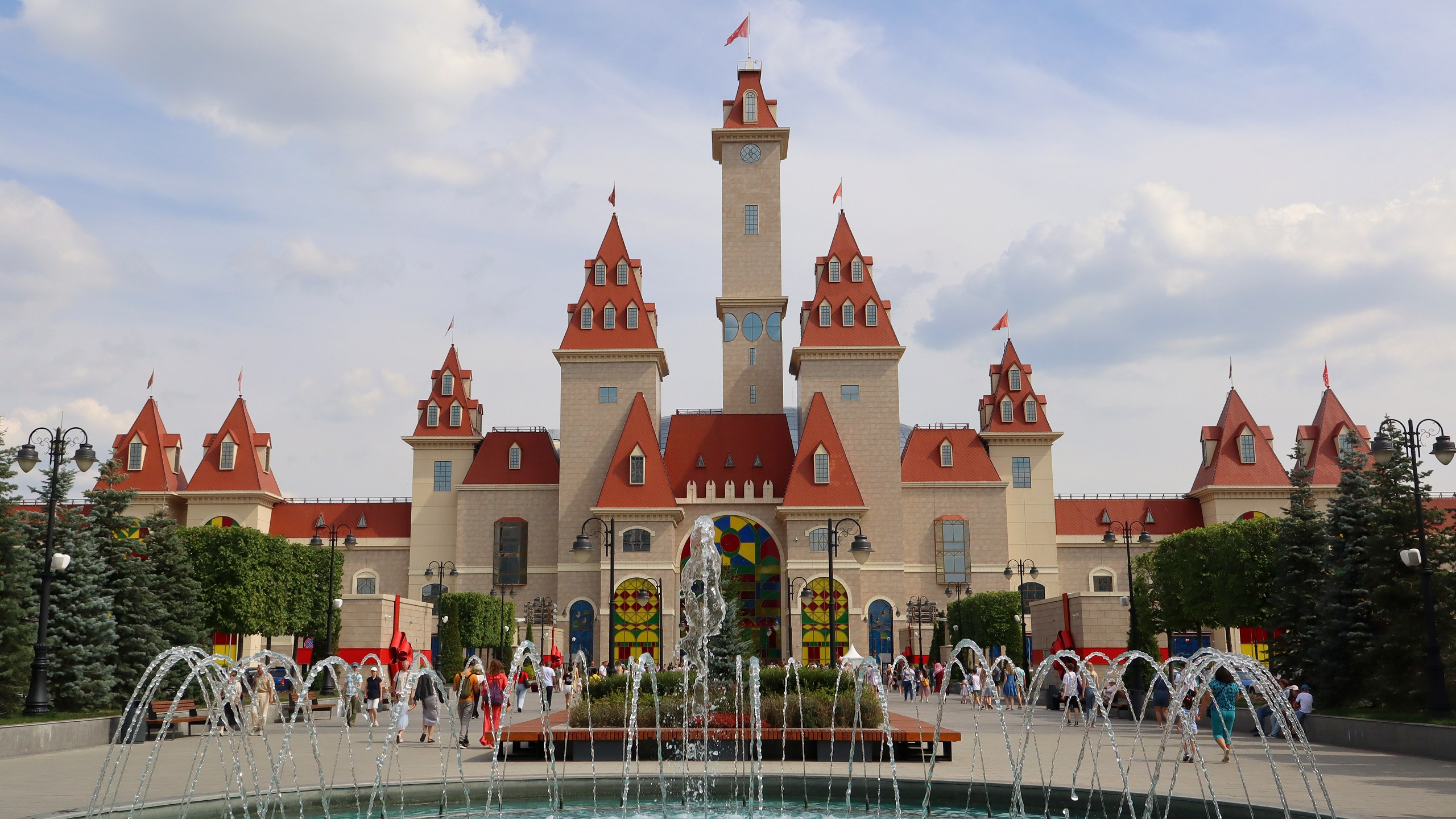
Main entrance

== Attractions ==
=== Roller coasters ===
| Ride | Year opened | Manufacturer | Description |
|---|---|---|---|
| Race of the Future | 2020 | Fabbri Group | A spinning wild mouse coaster of the Power Mouse Midi model line. |
| Shred The Sewers | 2020 | Intamin | A multi-launch coaster themed to the Teenage Mutant Ninja Turtles. Most of the coaster's layout takes place in a separate showroom from the rest of the park, where it packs four inversions and reaches speeds of 49.7 mph (80.0 km/h). |

=== Thrill rides ===
| Ride | Year opened | Manufacturer | Description |
|---|---|---|---|
| Baxter Stockman's Hammer of Doom | 2020 | Fabbri Group | A frisbee ride themed to the eponymous Teenage Mutant Ninja Turtles character. |
| Flight School | 2020 | Gerstlauer | A Sky Fly attraction. |
| Temple of Fire | 2020 | HUSS | A Top Spin ride. |
