= Scream (Heide Park) =

Gyro drop tower ride

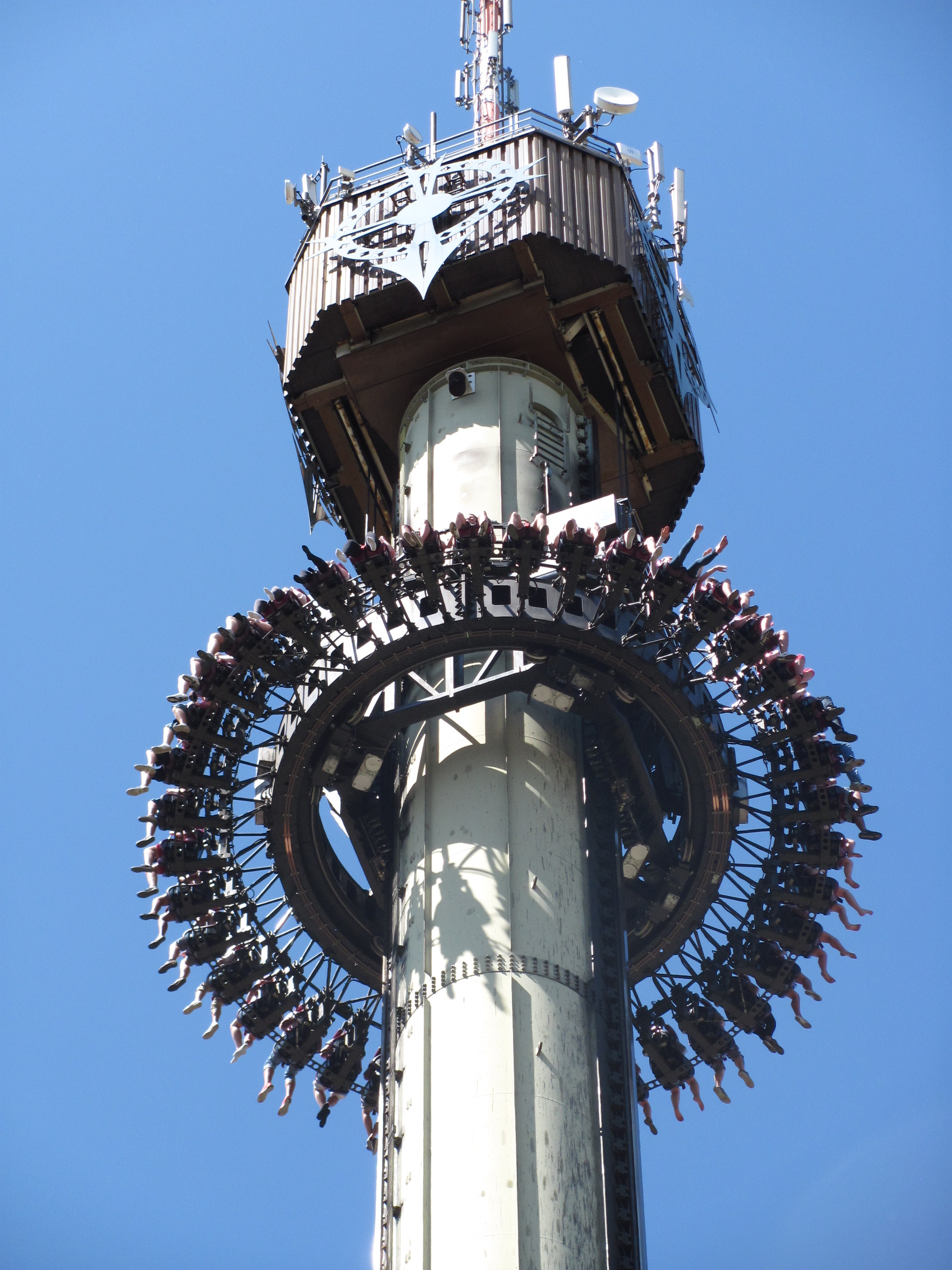

Heide Park
- Area: Transilvanien
- Coordinates: 53.027°N 9.878°E
- Status: Operating
- Cost: EUR 7,500,000
- Opening date: 2003
- Replaced: Aussichtsturm II (1992-2002)

Ride statistics
- Attraction type: Drop tower
- Manufacturer: Intamin
- Model: Gyro Tower
- Height: 103 m (338 ft)
- Drop: 71 m (233 ft)
- Speed: 98.3 km/h (61.1 mph)
- Vehicles: 1
- Riders per vehicle: 40
- Duration: 77s
- Height restriction: 130 to 195 cm (4 ft 3 in to 6 ft 5 in)

Scream is a gyro drop tower at the Heide Park amusement park in Soltau, Lower Saxony, Germany. It was constructed at a cost of €7.5 million by Intamin between October 2002 and April 2003, repurposing the structure of the Aussichtsturm II observation tower which opened in 1992. With a height of 103 metres (338 ft), riders plunge down 71 metres (233 ft) up to speeds of 98.3 kilometres per hour (61.1 mph). Scream, which has a diameter of 2.8 metres (9 ft 2 in), stands on a foundation of 8 metres (26 ft) in depth and 10 metres (33 ft) in diameter. The travelling time is 82 seconds, two seconds of which are the actual fall. The deceleration phase lasts for 5.5 seconds.

== Interesting facts ==
Heide Park advertised Scream as the world's highest Gyro-Drop-Tower up to the end of the 2020 season, although the Gyro-Drop-Tower Scream Zone in Kings Island has a higher drop height with 82 metres. The reason was Scream having a bigger overall height than Scream Zone.

However this record was finally beaten on April 27 2019 by Highlander at Hansa-Park in Sierksdorf which has a drop height of 103 metres and an overall height of 120 metres. After the teardown of the observation tower before the start of the 2022 season, is Scream now the highest attraction at Heide Park.
