= Cavallino (magazine) =

American car magazine

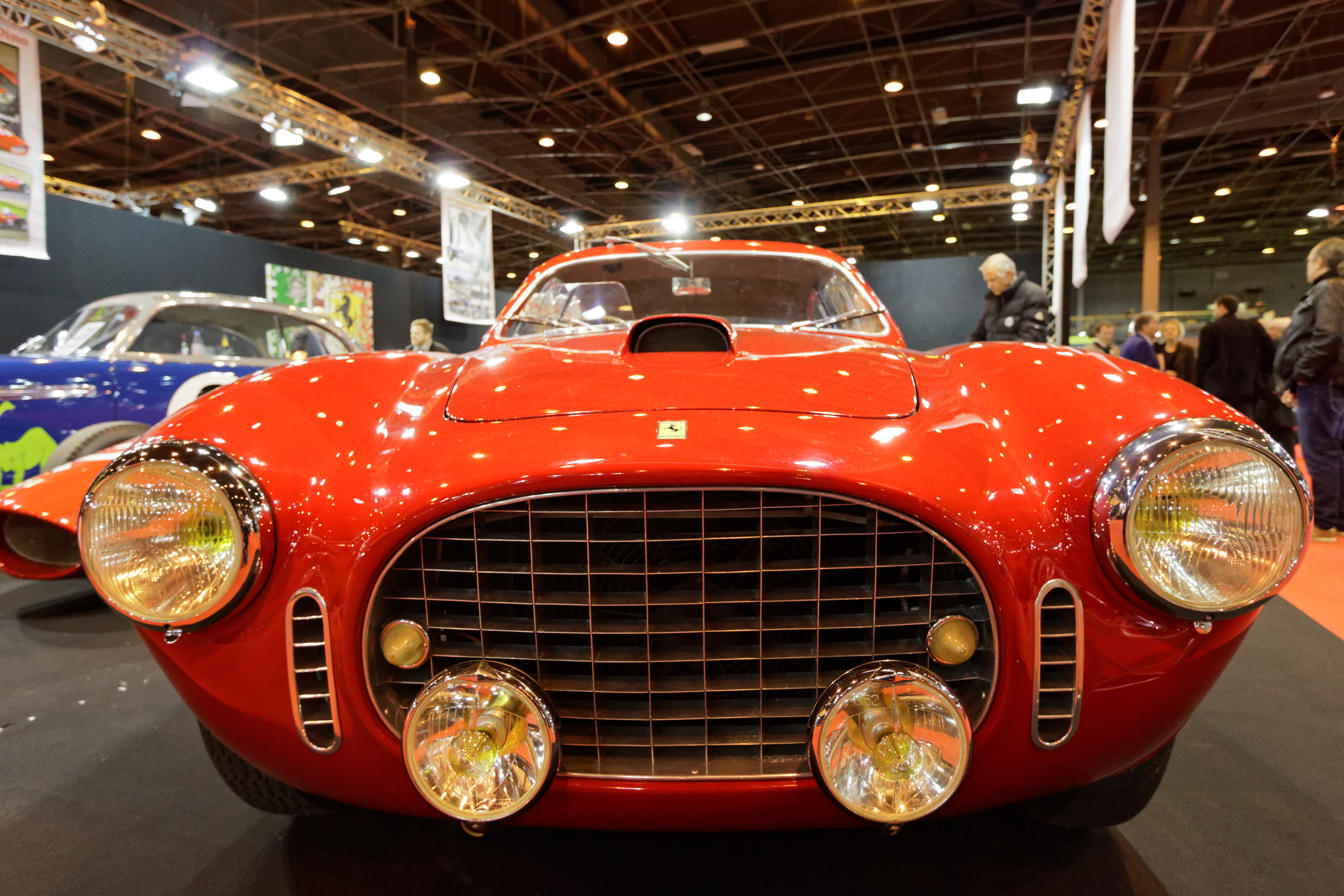
Issue number 250 was published in August 2022, featuring a red Ferrari 250 S on its cover page, similar to this of 0156ET

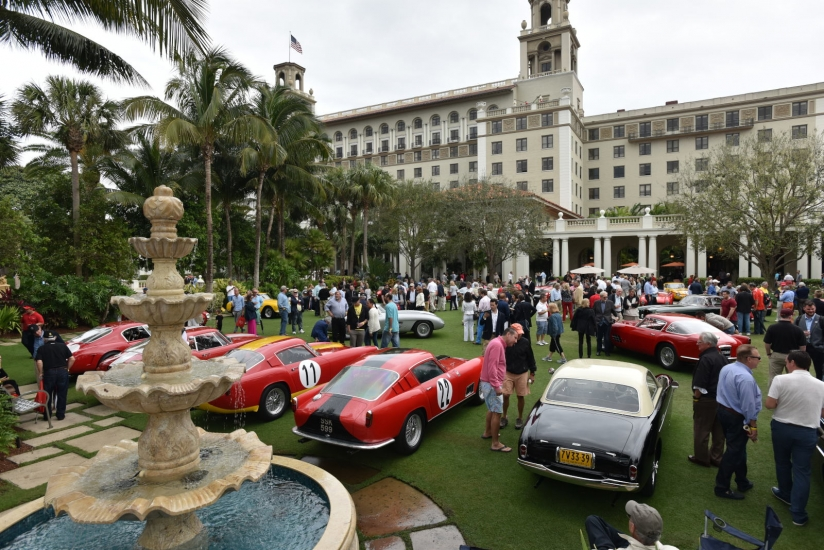
Concorso di Eleganza at The Breakers, Palm Beach at Cavallino Classic in January 2015.

Cavallino Magazine (1978–present) is a bi-monthly magazine that publishes articles on Ferrari automobiles, racing and personalities. It is based in Modena, Italy.

The first issue was the September and October issue in 1978 when Chuck Queener was editor, featuring articles by Stanley Nowak on the first 100 Ferrari's that were built, and by Edwin K. Niles on the Ferrari 225 Sport.

Since the early 1990s, it has sponsored the Palm Beach Cavallino Classic, an annual gathering of Ferrari enthusiasts in Palm Beach, Florida at The Breakers Resort. It is also the sponsor of the Classic Sports Sunday in Palm Beach, Florida.

The Cavallino Inc. media and event company was acquired in 2020 by Canossa Events of Italy, at a time when John Barnes and Alicia Barnes were president and vice president. Canossa had in 2019 became a part of Motorsport Network and is now part of duPont REGISTRY Group.

Canossa also holds the Cavallino Classic Modena show, beginning in 2021.

in 2024, Enzo Mattioli Ferrari became President and investors in Cavallino.
