= Parque da Mônica =

Indoor theme park in São Paulo, Brasil

- Interactive map of Parque da Mônica
- Location: São Paulo, SP, Curitiba, PR, Rio de Janeiro, RJ; Brazil
- Coordinates: 23.677185°S 46.69872°W
- Opened: January 10, 1993 (Shopping Eldorado); July 18, 1998 (Estação Plaza Show); November 10, 2000 (Shopping Città América); July 4, 2015 (Shopping SP Market)
- Closed: February 16, 2010 (Shopping Eldorado); 2000 (Estação Plaza Show); January 19, 2005 (Shopping Città América)
- Owner: Mauricio de Sousa Produções, Grupo São Joaquim
- Area: 10,000 m^{2} (110,000 sq ft)
- Website: parquedamonica.com.br

Parque da Mônica is an indoor amusement park themed after the Monica and Friends characters, created by Mauricio de Sousa. The original park opened in 1993 at the Shopping Eldorado in São Paulo, having operated until February 2010, when it closed due to debt and contractual problems with the mall's administrators. A new park opened at the Shopping SP Market on July 4, 2015, in the location of the former O Mundo da Xuxa theme park. The Eldorado park received more than 9 million visitors up until its closure.

In addition to the São Paulo park, two other locations existed: one in the shopping Città América in Rio de Janeiro, which operated from 2000 to 2005, and another in the Estação Plaza Show (now Shopping Estação) in Curitiba, which operated from 1998 to 2000. There was also a smaller park called Estação Turma da Mônica, opened in 2004 in Campinas. In July 2018, a new Estação da Turma da Mônica was inaugurated at the Shopping Cerrado in Goiânia, and a third location was opened in Olinda the following year. In addition, in 2010 the first international location was opened in Luanda, Angola.

== Comic book ==
In 1993, a monthly comic book with the same name as the park was launched in order to promote it. The comic contained the opening stories taking place at the park and was also used to promote new attractions there. After the comics started being published by Panini Comics in 2007, the comic book was renamed Turma da Mônica: Uma Aventura no Parque da Mônica (lit. Mônica's Gang: An Adventure in Monica's Park). In 2010, the comic book was discontinued due to the closure of the park. Although a new park was opened in 2015, the comic has not been relaunched.
