= Dahlonega (disambiguation) =

Dahlonega may refer to:

- Dahlonega, Georgia
- Dahlonega Gold Museum Historic Site, commemorates America's first gold rush
- Dahlonega Mine Train, a steel roller coaster located at Six Flags Over Georgia
- Dahlonega Mint, a branch of the United States Mint in Dahlonega, Georgia
- Dahlonega School No. 1, listed on the National Register of Historic Places in Wapello County, Iowa
- USS Dahlonega (YTB-770), a United States Navy Natick class large district harbor tug
