= The Great American Scream Machine =

The Great American Scream Machine is the name of two different roller coasters:

- Great American Scream Machine (Six Flags Great Adventure), a defunct steel roller coaster at Six Flags Great Adventure in Jackson Township, New Jersey, USA.
- Great American Scream Machine (Six Flags Over Georgia), a wooden roller coaster at Six Flags Over Georgia in Austell, Georgia, USA.
