= The Joker Funhouse Coaster =

Roller coaster at Six Flags Over Georgia

- Previously known as Wile E. Coyote Canyon Blaster (2004-2015)
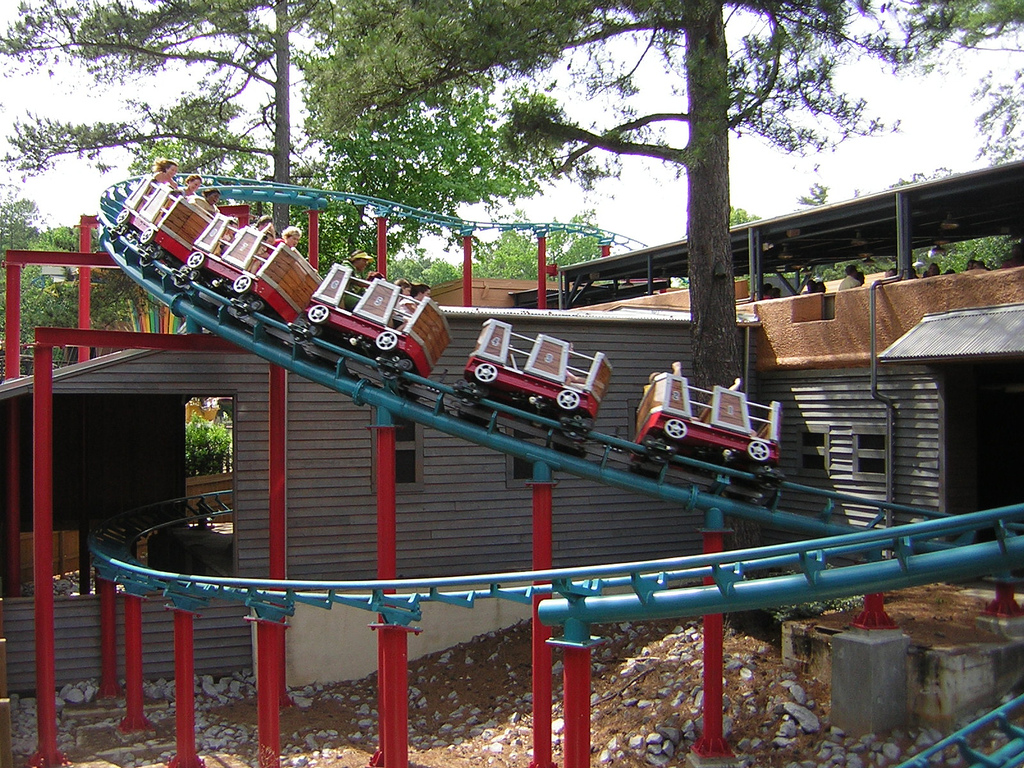
- The Joker Funhouse Coaster (as Wile E. Coyote Canyon Blaster, 2006)

Six Flags Over Georgia
- Location: Six Flags Over Georgia
- Park section: DC Super Friends
- Coordinates: 33.767835°N 84.550960°W
- Status: Operating
- Opening date: September 4, 2004

General statistics
- Type: Steel
- Manufacturer: Chance Rides
- Model: Big Dipper
- Lift/launch system: Friction wheel lift hill
- Length: 900 ft (270 m)
- Speed: 30 mph (48 km/h)
- Inversions: 0
- Duration: 1:28
- Capacity: 1000 riders per hour
- Height restriction: 36 in (91 cm)
- Trains: Single train with 5 cars; riders arranged 2 across in 2 rows for a total of 20 riders per train
- Fast Lane available
- The Joker Funhouse Coaster at RCDB

The Joker Funhouse Coaster is a Chance Rides steel roller coaster located at Six Flags Over Georgia in Atlanta, Georgia, United States.

The coaster is designed for families and children. It is located in the kids' themed area, "DC Super Friends", that replaced parts of the former "Bugs Bunny World". In September 2015, the park announced two new kids' areas to replace the former one. Since Wile E. Coyote Canyon Blaster was a part of the old area, it was re-themed in 2016 to fit the area of the DC Comics universe.
