= Great American Scream Machine (Six Flags Over Georgia) =

Wooden roller coaster in Georgia, US

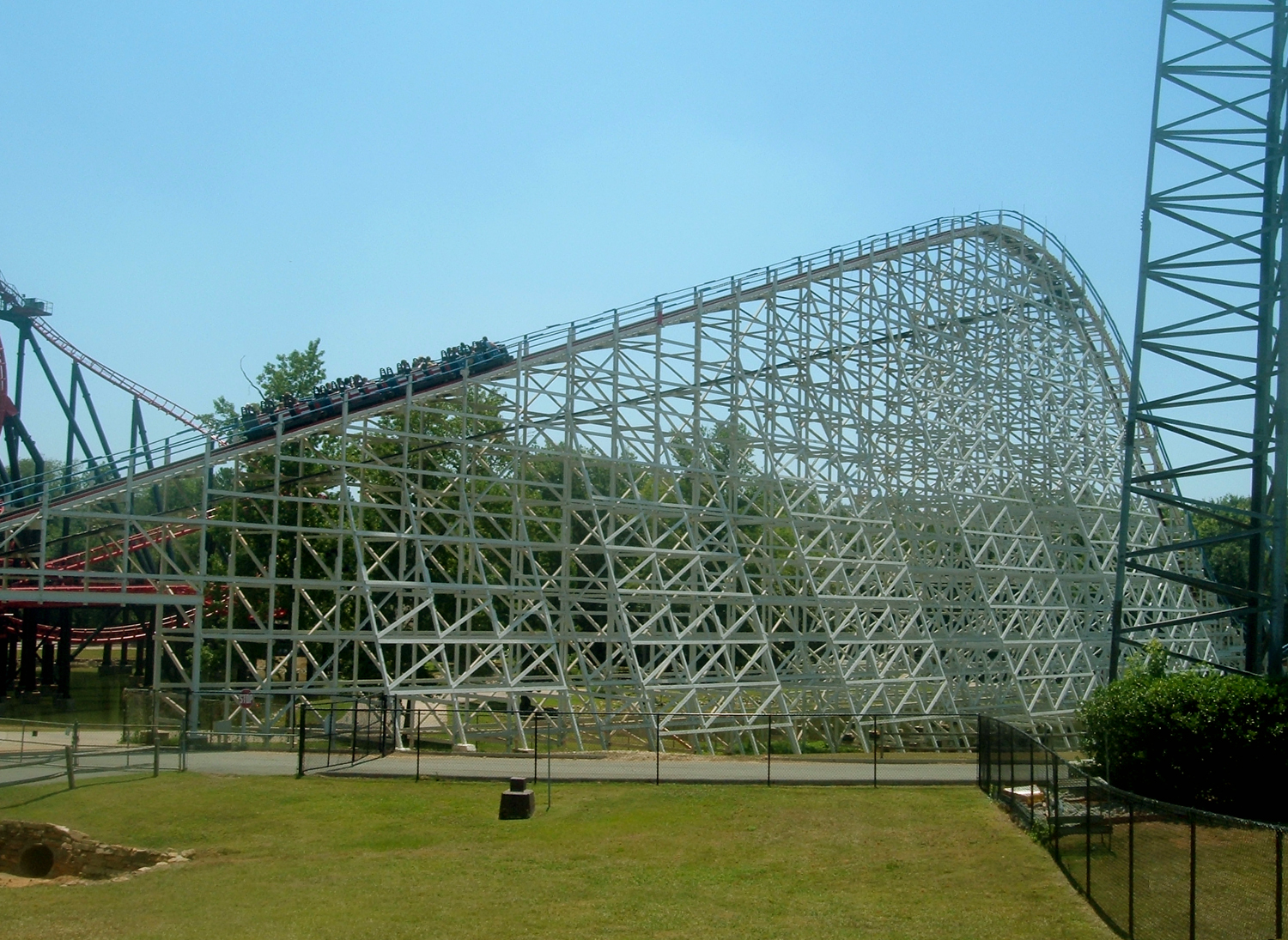
- The lift hill as shown from the right side of the park.

Six Flags Over Georgia
- Location: Six Flags Over Georgia
- Park section: Lickskillet
- Coordinates: 33°45′57″N 84°33′05″W
- Status: Operating
- Opening date: March 31, 1973

General statistics
- Type: Wood
- Manufacturer: Philadelphia Toboggan Coasters
- Designer: Don Rosser, John C. Allen, William Cobb
- Track layout: Out-and-back
- Lift/launch system: Chain Lift
- Height: 105 ft (32 m)
- Drop: 89 ft (27 m)
- Length: 3,800 ft (1,200 m)
- Speed: 57 mph (92 km/h)
- Inversions: 0
- Duration: 2:00
- Max vertical angle: 45°
- Capacity: 1200 riders per hour
- G-force: 3.7
- Height restriction: 48 in (122 cm)
- Trains: 2 trains with 6 cars; riders arranged 2 across in 2 rows for a total of 24 riders per train
- Fast Lane available
- Great American Scream Machine at RCDB

Great American Scream Machine (GASM) is a wooden roller coaster located at Six Flags Over Georgia in Austell, Georgia, United States. Manufactured by Philadelphia Toboggan Coasters, the ride opened in 1973 as the tallest, longest, and fastest roller coaster in the world. The 105-foot-tall (32 m) ride reaches a maximum speed of 57 mph (92 km/h). At the time of opening, early riders were given a "Red Badge of Courage" button for riding the coaster. On May 21, 2017, Great American Scream Machine received an ACE landmark designation from American Coaster Enthusiasts, recognized for becoming the first wooden coaster built by Six Flags and for being well maintained.

== History ==
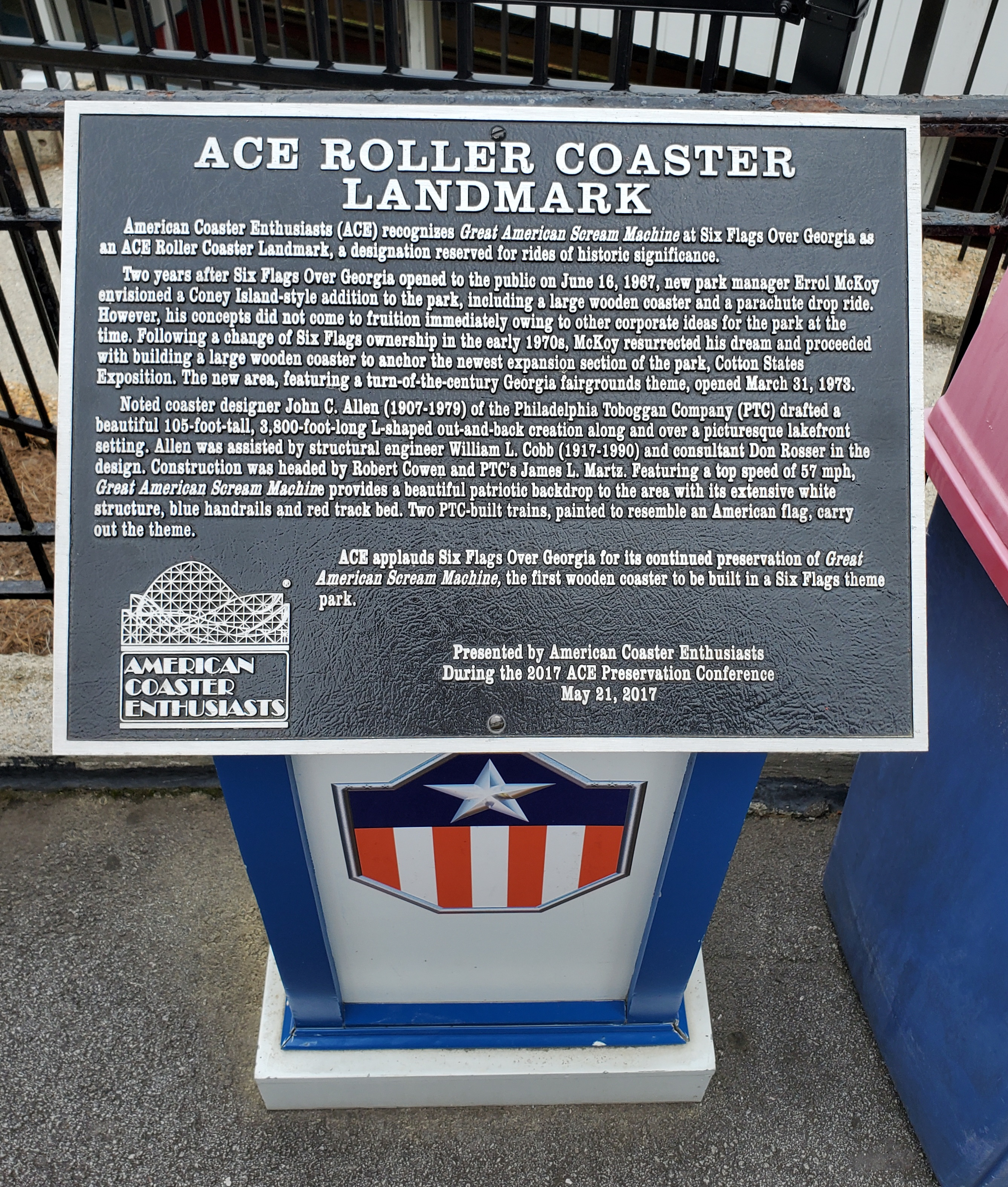
ACE Roller Coaster Landmark plaque for the Scream Machine.

Construction of Great American Scream Machine was subcontracted to Marvin M. Black & Sons. It officially opened to the public on March 31, 1973.

In the spring of 1993, Great American Scream Machine ran backwards for its 20th anniversary. The same thing would occur for its 45th anniversary in 2018.

== Operational information ==
A computerized block system is used to prevent trains from contacting each other. Great American Scream Machine has 5 blocks: Station, Transfer Table, Lift, Main Brake and Ready Brake. Normal operation uses two trains; however, it can be operated with only one. During two-train operation, if the train in the station has not fully exited the loading platform, the inbound train will stop abruptly in the Main Brakes. A combination of proximity switches, mechanical switches, photoelectric sensors and timers are all used by the controller to track train movements.

Each train consists of four cars with three rows per car, two riders per row, holding 24 total riders. Each row has a lap bar and a seat belt. Until the 2018 season, the lap bar itself was locked and unlocked by an electrical current that activates solenoids on the train, resulting in a "buzzing" electrical sound. They could be troublesome, sometimes requiring the operating crew to manually unlock the lap bar for a rider. For the 2018 season, the former Georgia Cyclone trains were added, which allowed for more reliable and safe lap bars to be installed on this ride. Each train consists of six cars with two rows per car, two riders per row, holding 24 riders total. The trains ride on steel wheels with guide wheels and upstops attached. The track is plank wood stacked 7 planks high, with steel running surfaces on the top, bottom and sides (locations where the running, guide and upstop wheels contact the track).

Before computerized control existed, operators used a lever to operate the brake system and dispatch trains. The operator near the end of the station controlled the main brakes at the end of the circuit; the operator at the front of the station operated the brakes at the station platform only and worked to dispatch trains to the lift.

== Awards ==
Golden Ticket Awards: Top wood Roller Coasters
Year									1998	1999
Ranking									–	–
Year	2000	2001	2002	2003	2004	2005	2006	2007	2008	2009
Ranking	–	42 (tie)	–	–	41	–	40	44	49 (tie)	–
Year	2010	2011	2012	2013	2014	2015	2016	2017	2018	2019
Ranking	–	–	48	43	–	–	–	–	–	–
Year	2020	2021	2022	2023	2024	2025	2026			
Ranking	N/A	–	–	–	–	–	–			

Note: Great American Scream Machine has not charted in the Golden Ticket Awards since 2013.
