= Six Flags Over Georgia =

Amusement park in Mableton, Georgia

- Logo used since 2025

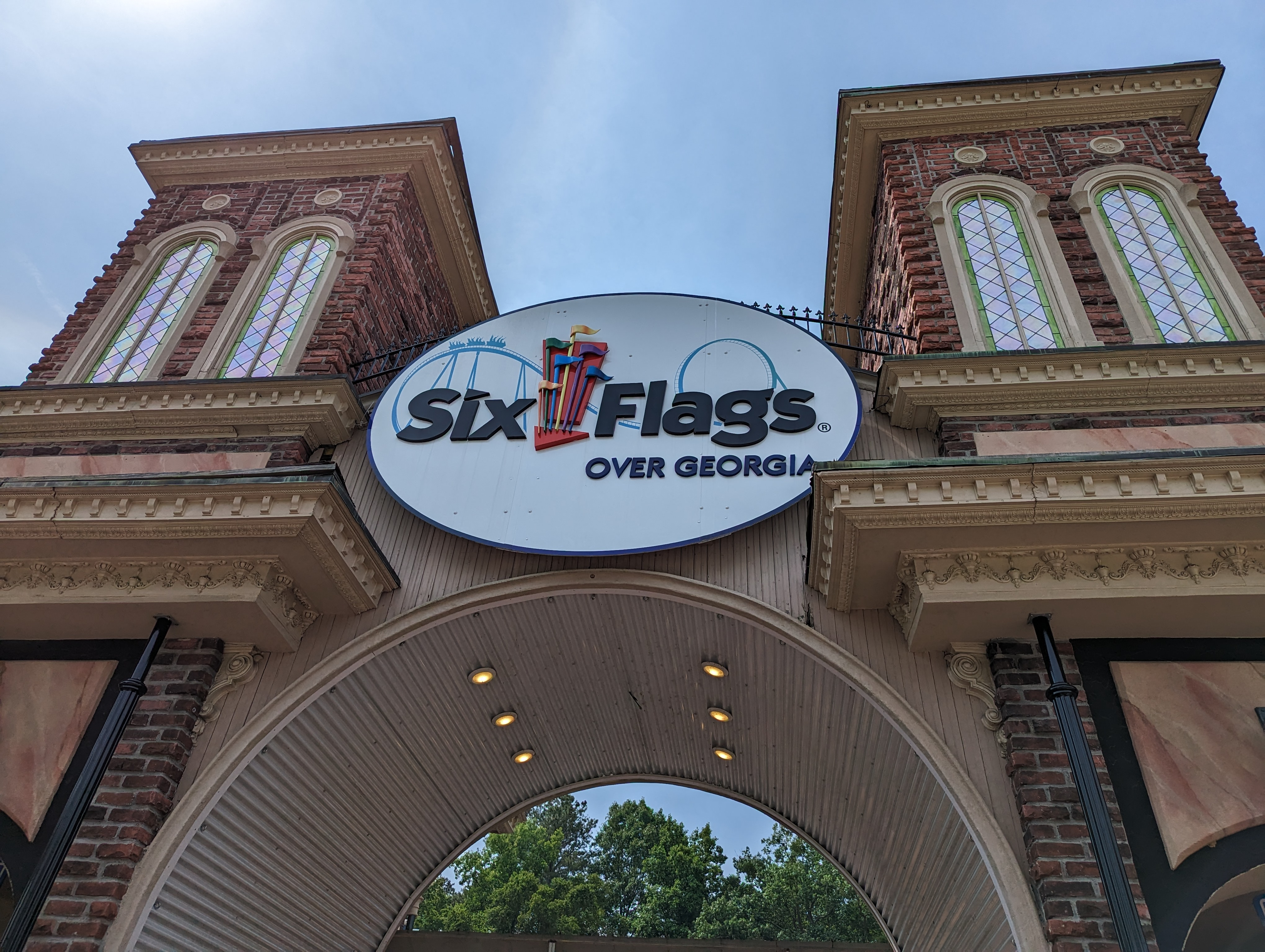
- The park's main entrance
- Interactive map of Six Flags Over Georgia
- Location: Mableton, Georgia, U.S.
- Coordinates: 33.76787°N 84.55065°W
- Status: Operating
- Opened: June 16, 1967
- Owner: Six Flags Over Georgia, Ltd.
- Park president: Richard Pretlow
- Operated by: Six Flags
- Slogan: The Thrill Capital of the South
- Operating season: March through November
- Area: 290 acres (120 ha)

Attractions
- Total: 43
- Roller coasters: 12
- Water rides: 3
- Website: sixflags.com/overgeorgia

Six Flags Over Georgia is a 290-acre (1.2 km^{2}) amusement park in Mableton, Georgia, United States, with an Austell post office address. Opening on June 16, 1967, it is the second amusement park in the Six Flags chain following the original Six Flags Over Texas, which opened in 1961.

Six Flags Over Georgia is one of three parks in the Six Flags chain to have been founded by Angus G. Wynne. As with other Six Flags parks, it features themes from the Warner Bros. Entertainment library, including characters from Looney Tunes and DC Comics.

== History ==
=== Development ===
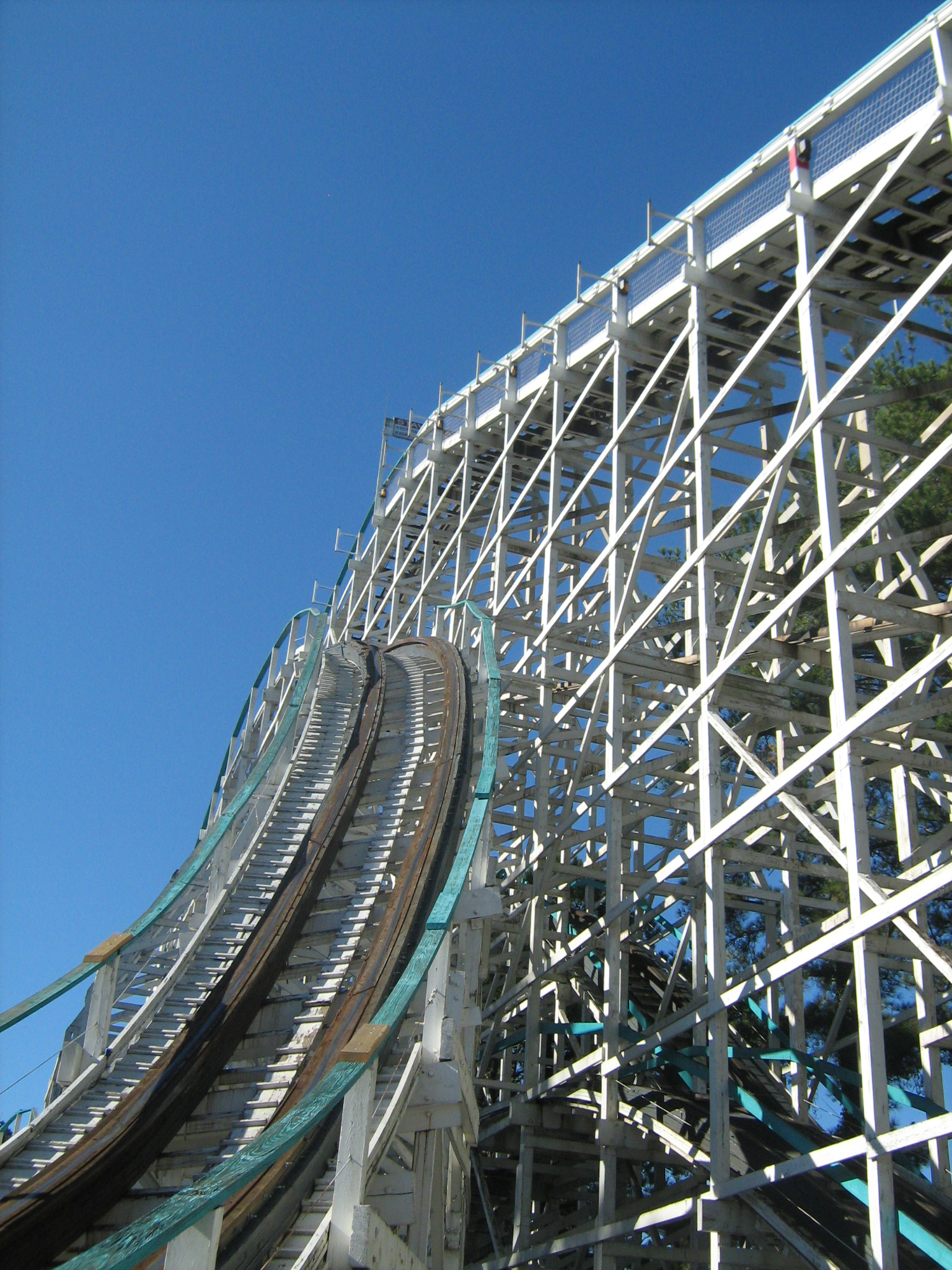
The Georgia Cyclone, opened in 1990.

After the success of his original Six Flags Over Texas park in Arlington, Texas, park founder Angus Wynne began searching for a location for a second park, looking mainly in the Southeastern United States, with initial design work on the park starting in 1964. In August 1965, the Wall Street Journal reported that Wynne's development company, Great Southwest Corporation, had purchased 3,000 acres (1,200 ha) of land along the Chattahoochee River outside of Atlanta for a planned $400 million industrial park with an adjacent $7 million amusement park. The land chosen was the site of the oldest permanent agricultural village in Georgia, home to Muscogee farmers from 200 BC to 500 AD. During development of the park the mounds were destroyed without being studied. The park itself sits on former dairy farm land known as Cole Brothers Dairy. The Cole Brothers sold their farm to Six Flags in the mid-1960s.

Wynne hired former Hollywood art directors Randall Duell and Hans Peters to develop the park, then named "Georgia Flags". Like its sister park in Texas, the design and theming of Six Flags Over Georgia was inspired by six different flags that have flown over the state (or, perhaps more accurately, the lands that are now part of it) during its history. The two states shared the connections to Spain, France, Confederate States of America, and the U.S.; for Georgia, Great Britain would replace Mexico, and the flag of the state of Georgia would replace that of Texas, even though Georgia was never a sovereign nation, as Texas once was. When Six Flags Over Georgia opened in 1967, Six Flags became the first theme park operator in the United States to operate parks at multiple locations.

=== The 1960s ===
Six Flags Over Georgia opened to the public on June 16, 1967. Attractions first available included the Log Jamboree log flume ride, Jean Ribaut's Adventure (a boat tour similar to Disney's Jungle Cruise attractions), the Six Flags Railroad, two driving attractions (the Happy Motoring Freeway and the Hanson Cars), two Satellite flat rides, the Tales of the Okefenokee dark ride, the Casa Loco tilt house, the Sky Lift/Astro Lift cable car and the park's first roller coaster, the Dahlonega Mine Train. The park's live entertainment offerings included a dolphin show, the Krofft Puppet Theater and the Athenaeum, later renamed the Crystal Pistol.

After a successful first season, plans were set in motion to expand the park, and adjustments were made to existing attractions based on visitor feedback. A second Log Jamboree flume was added, a new show debuted in the Krofft Puppet Theater and the effects inside the Tales of the Okefenokee were upgraded with the help of Krofft Studios. The park relocated Casa Loco out of its Spanish fort to make way for the Horror Cave haunted house attraction; a new adjacent building was built for Casa Loco's effects, which would become Casa Magnetica. However, the largest improvement was the addition of the park's first new section, Lickskillet. Located outside the park's railroad tracks and named after a Georgia mining town in the late 19th century, Lickskillet added three new rides — the Spindle Top (a Rotor flat ride, the Wheel Burrow (a Chance Tumbler) and the Sky Buckets, the park's second cable car ride — along with several craft shops and a shootout show performed on the street. In 1969, Six Flags added still more attractions, the Sky Hook observation tower, which was relocated from Six Flags Over Texas, the Mini Mine Train, the park's second roller coaster and the Chevy Show domed theater building.

=== The 1970s ===
In the early 1970s, Six Flags began augmenting its supply of costumed characters with creations from various Sid & Marty Krofft television series. Characters from H. R. Pufnstuf began appearing in the park in 1970, with characters from Lidsville added in 1972. The 1970 production in the Krofft Puppet Theater was based on H. R. Pufnstuf, as well. These characters left the park after the 1974 season as Krofft decided to open its own amusement park, The World of Sid and Marty Krofft, in downtown Atlanta. In Lickskillet, the Drunken Barrels flat ride had replaced the Wheel Burrow, and in 1972 Six Flags debuted the fully-restored Riverview Carousel on a hilltop adjacent to the section. This carousel, purchased from the defunct Riverview Park in Chicago, was built into a pavilion modeled after its original home.

For the 1973 season, Six Flags added its second park expansion, the Cotton States Exposition, a development four years in the making. In 1969, general manager Errol McKoy first proposed that the park install a wooden roller coaster, an idea to which Angus Wynne wasn't very receptive. By 1971, however, the concept was approved, and designer John C. Allen and the Philadelphia Toboggan Company were contracted to design the ride, which opened in 1973 as The Great American Scream Machine. The Scream Machine, the largest roller coaster in the world at the time, was the anchor attraction for the Cotton States area, which was inspired by the 1895 Cotton States and International Exposition. In 1974, Six Flags added two new rides, the Mo-Mo the Monster Octopus ride in the USA section and the Phlying Phlurpus spinning ride in Cotton States; Mo-Mo would later move to Cotton States, as well. The Spanish section received a number of children's rides for the 1975 season. After the end of that season, the Happy Motoring Freeway was removed to make way for the Great Gasp parachute drop, which would be the park's new attraction for 1976.

- 1977: Added Wheelie (Schwarzkopf Enterprise)
- 1978: Added Mind Bender.
- 1979: Added Highland Swings (Chance Yo-Yo)

=== Present day ===
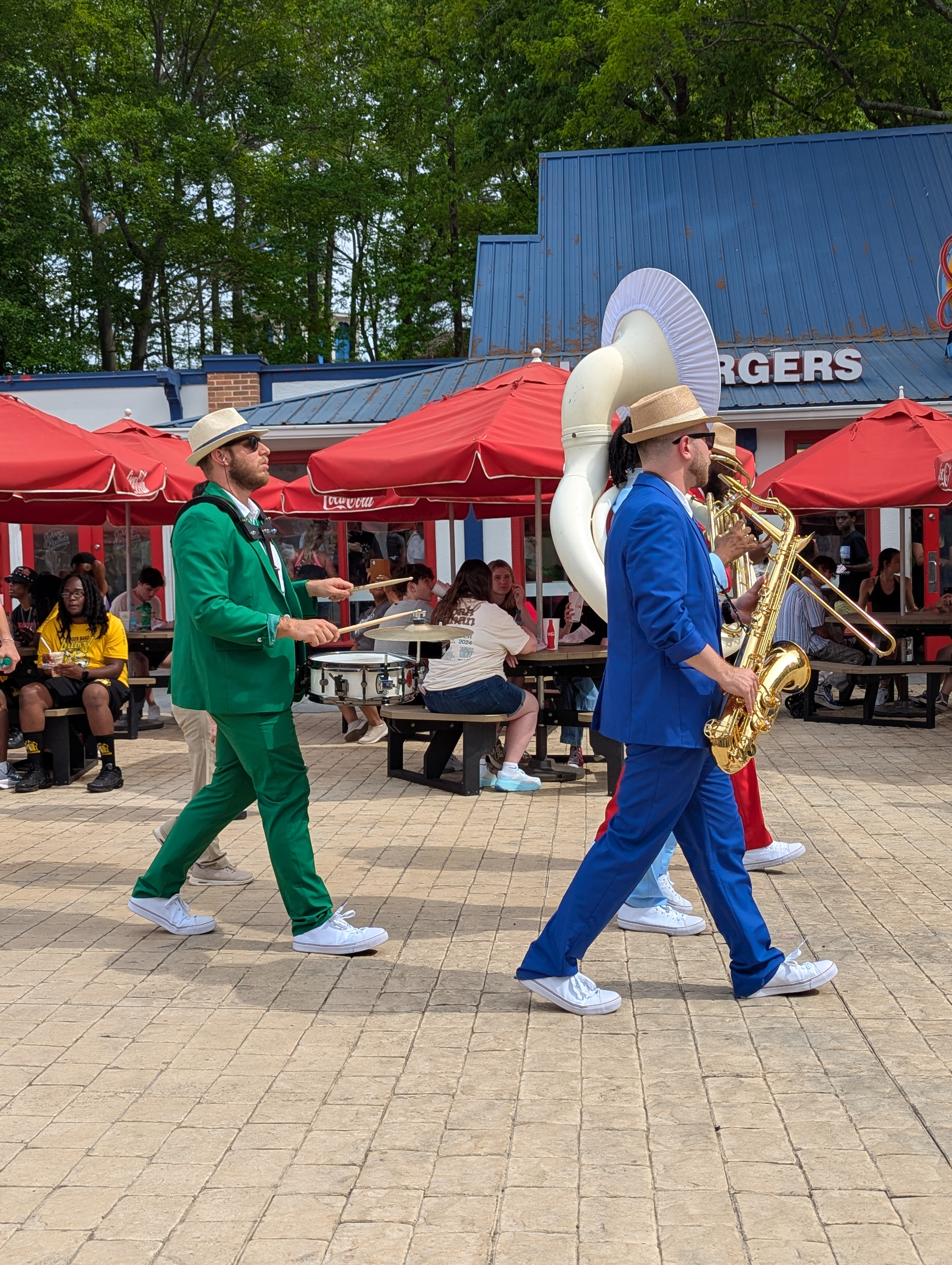
A band performance in the park, 2025

In late 2010, Six Flags began the process of removing licensed themeing from attractions. They terminated several licenses including their license with Thomas the Tank Engine. Thomas Town was renamed and rethemed to Whistlestop Park in time for the 2011 season. In an arrangement similar to that for Six Flags Over Texas, it is owned by a group of approximately 120 limited partners—some the heirs of Angus G. Wynne—and is managed by the corporation. In years past, this has caused significant friction, including legal action. Starting in 1991, the park was managed by Time Warner Entertainment. The partners sued Time Warner in 1997, claiming that they had neglected to invest in the park and overcharged the partners for the improvements it did receive. A Gwinnett County civil court jury agreed and awarded the partners damages in excess of US$600 million. In 1998, Time Warner sold its interests in the Six Flags parks to Premier Parks of Oklahoma City, which later changed its name to Six Flags Theme Parks, Inc.

On August 29, 2013, Six Flags officially announced it would add a Hurricane Harbor water park next door to the park for the 2014 season. In late April 2014, the park announced that it will expand their season from October to January, to include the new Christmas event, Holiday in the Park for years to come.

As part of Six Flags' 2015 capital investment program, Six Flags Over Georgia received two rides in its Gotham City section. The first, "The Joker: Chaos Coaster" is a Larson Giant Loop ride approximately 70 feet in height, while the second, "Harley Quinn Spinsanity", is a more traditional Tilt-A-Whirl family ride. Both attractions were part of a broader renovation of Gotham City, which also included a new character meet-and-greet area and improvements to the existing Gotham City Eatery restaurant.

In 2016, Six Flags added two new children areas to the park – Bugs Bunny Boomtown and DC Super Friends, the first in the Six Flags chain. On June 16, 2016, it was announced that Dodge City Bumper Cars would be closed and removed from the park to make room for a new ride in 2017. On September 1, 2016, the park announced that an all new dark ride named Justice League: Battle For Metropolis would replace Dodge City Bumper Cars.

The City of Mableton incorporated in November 2022, and Six Flags Over Georgia became a part of the city limits.

In December 2024, Six Flags announced that they would take full ownership on the park and White Water from its partners for $332 million, of which the transition will occur at the beginning of January 2027.

== Rides and attractions ==
Six Flags Over Georgia, like most amusement parks, prides itself on its roller coaster collection. Goliath and The Riddler Mindbender routinely rank among the top steel roller coasters listed by Amusement Today magazine in its Golden Ticket Awards. The collection expanded most recently in 2025 with the addition of Georgia Gold Rusher, the world's first Ultra Surf roller coaster from Intamin.

Aside from the roller coasters, Six Flags Over Georgia maintains a large number of other rides and attractions. Two attractions of note are Acrophobia, installed in 2001 as the world's first "floorless" freefall tower ride, and the Riverview Carousel.

=== Riverview Carousel ===
Riverview Carousel is one of only three remaining five-abreast carousels known to exist. Located in an area of the park commonly referred to as Carousel Hill, The Riverview Carousel opened at the park in 1972. It is a 1908 PTC Carousel and is located in the Cotton States section after being moved from Riverview Park in Chicago. It was added to the National Register of Historic Places on January 27, 1995.

=== Roller coasters ===
Ride name	Picture	Year opened	Manufacturer	Current location	Description
Batman: The Ride		1997	Bolliger & Mabillard	Gotham City	A steel inverted coaster. It is one of several identical rides operated by Six Flags Theme Parks using the same name.
Blue Hawk		1992	Vekoma	Lickskillet	A looping roller coaster. Ride moved from Wildwood, New Jersey's defunct Dinosaur Beach boardwalk. Inherited the Arrow trains from the Great American Scream Machine formerly located at Six Flags Great Adventure. Formerly named Ninja, it has had a full refurbishment and is now named Blue Hawk as of the 2016-2017 season.
Dahlonega Mine Train		1967	Arrow Dynamics	Peachtree Square	A steel mine train. The original design was a wood supporting structure with steel tubular rails; now, much of the wood is ornamental.
Dare Devil Dive		2011	Gerstlauer	U.S.A.	A Euro-Fighter with a 95-foot-tall vertical lift and three inversions.
Georgia Gold Rusher		2025	Intamin	Lickskillet	World's first "Ultra Surf" model. Replaced Splashwater Falls. Originally intended for a park in Vietnam that got scrapped.
Georgia Scorcher		1999	Bolliger & Mabillard	Georgia	A stand-up roller coaster. Was the last new B&M stand-up built to-date until 2023 and is one of only two in the Southeast.
Goliath		2006	Bolliger & Mabillard	U.S.A.	A hypercoaster. One of the first hypercoasters in the Southeastern United States.
Great American Scream Machine		1973	John C. Allen / Philadelphia Toboggan Company	Lickskillet	A wooden roller coaster. Opened as the world's tallest and fastest roller coaster at a height of 105 feet (32 m) and speeds of 57 miles per hour (92 km/h).
The Riddler Mindbender		1978	Anton Schwarzkopf	Gotham City	A steel looping coaster. The park has claimed that it was the world's first triple-loop coaster. However, the second "loop" is actually an inclined helix and does not turn riders upside-down. In 1997, it was remodeled after The Riddler to fit the new Gotham City theme. Previously known as Mind Bender (1978–2019)
Superman: Ultimate Flight		2002	Bolliger & Mabillard	Metropolis Park	A steel flying coaster. It was the Southeast's first flying roller coaster, and the first B&M flying coaster in North America.
The Joker Funhouse Coaster		2004	Chance-Morgan	DC Super Friends	A family roller coaster. Re-themed to The Joker Funhouse Coaster in 2016 with green tracks and purple supports. Previously known as Wile E. Coyote Canyon Blaster (2004–2015)
Twisted Cyclone		2018	Rocky Mountain Construction	Coastal	A steel hybrid coaster that opened on May 25, 2018. Previously known as Georgia Cyclone, which was a wooden roller coaster constructed in 1990. Some of the original structure of the Georgia Cyclone was left in place, though heavily modified, to make the new coaster.

=== Thrill Rides ===
Ride Name	Year Opened	Manufacturer (Ride Type)	Current location	Other notes
Acrophobia	2001	Intamin (Stand-up gyro drop tower)	Peachtree Square	
SkyScreamer	2013	Funtime (StarFlyer)	Lickskillet	Park's tallest ride standing at 242-foot (74 m) tall.
Pandemonium	2019	Zamperla (Giant Discovery)	Lickskillet	A Zamperla Giant Discovery ride.
Catwoman Whip	2020	Zamperla (Endeavour)	Gotham City	An enterprise like ride.

=== Family Rides ===
Ride Name	Year Opened	Manufacturer (Ride Type)	Current location	Other notes
Six Flags Railroad - Marthasville and Rabun Gap	1967	Guiberson-Harpur Corp. (Train)	Peachtree Square and Piedmont	3 ft (914 mm) narrow gauge train ride around the park; the locomotives used to run on steam but were converted to Diesel hydraulic power in the mid-2000s.
Harley Quinn: Wild Whirl	2015	Larson International (Tilt-A-Whirl)	Gotham City	A modern twist on a classic tilt a whirl
Hanson Cars	1967	Arrow Development (Antique Cars)	Carousel Hill	Moved to current location in 1990; originally located where Georgia Cyclone is in the Coastal section.
The Riverview Carousel	1972	PTC (Carousel)	Carousel Hill	Moved from Riverview Park; listed on National Register of Historic Places. Originally opened in 1908. The carousel model number is PTC #17.
DC Super Villains Swing	2004	Zierer (Wave Swinger)	Gotham City	Purchased from Thrill Valley Amusement Park in Japan (along with 4 rides that went to Six Flags New Orleans). Formerly known as Gotham City Crime Wave 2004-2019
Monster Mansion	1967	Arrow Development (dark ride)	Piedmont	Formerly Tales Of The Okefenokee (1967–1980) and Monster Plantation (1981–2008).
Justice League: Battle for Metropolis	2017	Sally Corporation, Oceaneering International (Dark Ride)	Metropolis Park	A shooting dark ride. Formerly had 3D from 2017 until around 2022.
Poison Ivy: Toxic Spin	2020	Eli Bridge Scrambler	Gotham City	A classic scrambler ride.
Wonder Woman Flight School	2016	Larson Flying Scooters	DC Super Friends	Spinning flat ride where riders control their vehicle

=== Water rides ===
Ride Name	Year Opened	Manufacturer (Ride Type)	Current location	Other notes
Log Jamboree	1968	Arrow Dynamics (Log Flume)	Georgia	Originally operated with two separate flumes, current ride is the second flume.
Thunder River	1982	Intamin (River rapids ride)	Lickskillet	River rapids ride with 12-passenger boats.

=== Hurricane Harbor Atlanta ===
Name	Description	Height Requirement
Bonzai Pipelines	Multi-slide complex	Over 42"
Calypso Bay	Wave pool	
Paradise Island	Children's area	None with adult, Over 36" alone
Tsunami Surge	Bowl slides	Over 48"

=== Children's rides and attractions ===
Ride Name	Year Opened	Manufacturer/Ride Type	Current location
Tweety's Tweehouse	2001	Zamperla Jumpin’ Star – junior drop tower. Originally known as Tweety's Clubhouse until 2015.	Bugs Bunny Boomtown
Yosemite Sam's Wacky Wagons	2016	Zamperla Mini Ferris Wheel - junior Ferris Wheel	Bugs Bunny Boomtown
Acme Trucking Co.	1992	Zamperla Convoy - kiddie truck ride. Originally known as Convoy Grande until 2015.	Bugs Bunny Boomtown
Daffy Duck's Bucket Blasters	2016	Mack Rides Spinning Boat Ride - Spinning flat ride where riders are equipped with water blasters	Bugs Bunny Boomtown
Speedy Gonzales Speed Boats	2016	Spinning flat ride with riders in miniature speed boats	Bugs Bunny Boomtown
Looney Tunes Adventure Camp	2010	Moved from Whistlestop Park to Bugs Bunny Boomtown in 2016. Originally known as Whistlestop Park Playground.	Bugs Bunny Boomtown
Superman: Tower of Power	2016	Zamperla tower ride	DC Super Friends
The Batcopters	2016	Spinning flat ride where riders can change the altitude of their vehicles during the ride	DC Super Friends
Rockin' Tug	2004	Zamperla (Rockin' Tug)	Carousel Hill
Up, Up & Away	2004	Zamperla (Balloon Race)	Carousel Hill

== Former rides ==
Ride name	Manufacturer (Model)	Year Opened	Year Closed	Description
Astro Lift	Von Roll Holding (Sky Ride)	1967	1981	87-foot tall Sky Ride that transported guests between the Confederate and USA sections. Vehicles were used for Sky Buckets after closure.
Bugs Bunny High Sea Adventure	Intamin Flying Dutchman	1992	2021	Originally known as Santa Maria until 2015. Removed in 2021.
Casa Loco		1967	1967	Predecessor to Horror Cave
Casa Magnetica		1970	1983	"Gravity hill" attraction
Déjà Vu	Vekoma (Giant Inverted Boomerang)	2001	2007	One of only five giant inverted boomerangs in the world. Purchased by Mirabilandia in Brazil in 2009.
Dodge City Bumper Cars	(Bumper cars)	1973	2016	Replaced by Justice League: Battle for Metropolis
Drunken Barrels	Intamin (Drunken Barrels)	1971	1984	Spinning tea-cups ride with a tilted platform. Replaced by relocated Wheelie attraction.
Flying Dutchman	Giovanola (Swinging Ship)	1980	1997	
Freefall	Intamin (Free Fall)	1983	2006	First generation free fall tower.
Georgia Cyclone	Curtis D. Summers / Dinn Corporation (Wooden Roller Coaster)	1990	2017	A wooden roller coaster, which closed on July 30, 2017, was converted into a steel hybrid coaster.
Great American Force	Round-Up	1986	1986	Replaced Mo-Mo the Monster for one season after it was damaged in a lightning storm.
Great Gasp	Intamin (Parachute tower)	1976	2004	Replaced by Goliath.
Great Six Flags Air Racer	Intamin	1984	2000	Replaced by Acrophobia.
Happy Motoring Freeway	Arrow	1967	1975	Car ride replaced by Great Gasp.
Highland Swings	Chance Rides (Yo-Yo)	1979	1997	Located in the British section.
Horror Cave		1968	1985	A Haunted attraction in the Spanish themed area, entered through a colossal head with a gaping mouth.
Jean Ribault's Adventure		1967	1981	A boat ride modeled on the Disneyland Jungle Cruise; replaced by Thunder River.
The Joker: Chaos Coaster	Larson (SuperLoop)	2015	2022	A Larson fireball ride. Replaced by Kid Flash Cosmic Coaster in 2023.
Log Jamboree flume #1	Arrow	1967	1991	One of two side-by-side flume rides; replaced by Ragin' Rivers.
Looping Starship #1	Intamin	1985	1985	Replaced Wheelie; removed after one season due to Six Flags' Ride Rotation Program.
Looping Starship #2	Intamin	1989	2005	Second ride of this type in the park; removed for construction of Goliath; relocated to Six Flags Over Texas alongside Six Flags AstroWorld's installation to be combined into Acme Rock 'n Rockets.
Mini Mine Train	Arrow Dynamics (Miniature Mine Train)	1969	1988	A mini mine train kiddie roller coaster. Previously known as Yahoola Hooler.
Mo-Mo the Monster	Eyerly (Monster)	1974	1991	Replaced Satellite rides, relocated to former Sky Hook site in 1978; moved to the former site of Phyling Phlurpus in 1983; removed due to lightning strike 1986, returned in 1987.
Phlying Phlurpus	Tread Corp. (Flying Mouse)	1974	1977	Unique Flying Scooters ride with a ride system that looks comparable to a chairswing attraction.
Ragin' Rivers	New Wave Products	1991	1998	Raft water slides; replaced Log Jamboree flume #1; replaced by Georgia Scorcher.
Satellite #1	Chance (Trabant)	1967	1973	Originally on site of Chevy Show; moved in 1968 and replaced by Mo-Mo the Monster in 1974.
Satellite #2	Chance (Trabant)	1968	1973	Placed next to Satellite #1 and replaced in 1974 by Mo-Mo the Monster
Shake, Rattle and Roll	Eli Bridge (Scrambler)	1980's	2010	An indoor scrambler removed to make way for Dare Devil Dive.
Sky Buckets	Von Roll (Sky Ride)	1968	2020	Had stations in ScreamPunk District and Peachtree Square. The ride was kept closed during much of the 2020 season due to sanitization concerns during the COVID-19 pandemic, and by the 2021 season all references and signage for the ride had been removed. The vehicles were relocated to Six Flags Great Adventure for parts for their Skyway until that closed after 2024. One of the vehicles is now at Kings Dominion for use at a shelf at one of the gift shops.
Sky Hook	Von Roll Holding (Sky Hook)	1969	1977	Observation attraction. Relocated from Six Flags Over Texas and relocated to Magic Springs and Crystal Falls.
Spindle Top	Chance (Rotor)	1968	2001	
Splashwater Falls	Hopkins (Shoot-the-Chutes)	1986	2018	Boats glide on a 50 ft (15 m) tall flume and then drop down to a soaking pool. Closed in 2018, and was dismantled in 2021, to eventually make way for the new Georgia Gold Rusher.
Tales of the Okefenokee	Arrow	1967	1980	Named after the Okefenokee Swamp, a flume-based dark ride based on the Uncle Remus stories by Joel Chandler Harris. It was redesigned in 1968 by Sid And Marty Krofft, brothers who were well known for their work as puppeteers in children's TV programs, with more complex animation. It was replaced in 1981 by Monster Plantation, which reused the same flume trough.
Wheel Barrow	Chance (Tumbler)	1968	1970	Only one of its kind; replaced by Drunken Barrels
Wheelie	Anton Schwarzkopf (Enterprise)	1977	2012	Replaced by SkyScreamer; relocated to Fun Spot America Theme Parks after removal.
Viper	Anton Schwarzkopf (Shuttle Loop)	1995	2001	A shuttle loop roller coaster. Moved from Six Flags Great America, moved to Six Flags Kentucky Kingdom, operated as Greezed Lightnin' until the park was closed after the 2009 season.
Z-Force	Intamin (Space Diver Roller Coaster)	1988	1991	A space diver roller coaster. Moved from Six Flags Great America, moved to Six Flags Magic Mountain and renamed Flashback. It was scrapped in 2008.
Gold Town Racers	J&J Amusements Go Karts	1999	2024	go-karts
Kid Flash Cosmic Coaster	Skyline Attractions P'Sghetti Bowl model.	2023	2024	Georgia's first single rail coaster and only racing roller coaster in Georgia.
Sky Coaster	Skycoaster	1996	2021	

== Timeline ==
- 1967: Park opens to the public on June 16. Attractions included: Hanson antique car ride, Six Flags Railroad, Dahlonega Mine Train, Crystal Pistol revue theatre (labeled during the first few months as the Atheneum), Tales of the Okefenokee (a water-propelled dark ride), Castillo De Soto (a replica of a Spanish fortress off of which guests could fire wax cannonballs), Casa Loco (a walk-through attraction), the Porpoise Show, the Flying Jenny (a carousel-type ride powered by a live mule named Joe), Lafayette's Shooting Gallery, Jean Ribault's Adventure (a scenic narrated boat cruise), Petsville (a petting zoo), Happy Motoring Freeway, the Krofft Puppet Theatre, the Dual Satellites (a pair of Trabant rides flanking the entrance to the puppet theatre), the Astro Lift (a Von Roll sky ride), and the Log Jamboree (consisting of only a single flume).
- 1968: Added the Lickskillet area which includes the Spindle Top (rotor ride), the Wheel Burrow (Chance Tumbler), several craft shops, and a shootout show performed on the street. Sky Buckets added between Confederate and Lickskillet sections, giving the park a second sky ride. Log Jamboree receives a second flume (with a tunnel over the final plunge). Casa Loco is removed, and the Horror Cave, another walk-through attraction, debuts inside of its former location. Tales of the Okefenokee is redesigned by puppeteers Sid and Marty Krofft. Satellite #1 (Trabant ride) is moved behind Satellite #2 to the right side of the Krofft Puppet Theatre. Chevy Show Cinema (painted red) is built on the original site of Satellite #1.
- 1969: Sky Hook is imported from Six Flags Over Texas and added to the United States section. Yahoola Hooler is added.
- 1970: An extension of the Spanish section featuring additional cannons and a variant of the Casa Magnetica tilt house attraction at Six Flags Over Texas is added. Flying Jenny is renamed Mule-Go-Round and moved in front of Casa Magnetica. Yahoola Hooler is renamed Mini-Mine Train. Chevy Show Cinema is painted blue. Wheel Burrow is removed from the Lickskillet section at the end of the season.
- 1971: The Drunken Barrels ride replaces The Wheel Burrow.
- 1972: The Riverview Carousel is relocated from Riverview Park in Chicago added to a new area north of the Spanish section commonly referred to as Carousel Hill.
- 1973: Added the Cotton States Exposition area, featuring the Great American Scream Machine. The Dual Satellite Rides are removed at the end of the season.
- 1974: Added Phlying Phlurpus to Cotton States Exposition section. Mo-Mo the Monster replaces Dual Satellite Rides. Mule-Go-Round is removed at the end of the season. The Krofft brothers cease ties with Six Flags at the end of the season.
- 1975 Happy Motoring Freeway removed at the end of the season. The Ferris Wheel, Gusano Contento (The Caterpiller), Regata De Botes (boat ride), rides and the Children's Theatre are added to the kiddie sub-section of the Spanish Section. The American Pie Jamboree show moves into the Krofft Theatre.
- 1976: Added Great Gasp Parachute Ride on April 9 at a cost of 1.5 million dollars. Jumping Frijolies ride is added to the kiddie sub-section of the Spanish Section. The Lickskillet Mill is added at the foot of the Lickskillet train trestle. The former Krofft theatre's exterior is remodeled adding a water feature along the outside walls and renamed "The Bicentennial Theatre".
- 1977: Added Wheelie (Schwarzkopf Enterprise) to U.S.A section in March at a cost of half a million dollars. Removed Phlying Phlurpus & Sky Hook at the end of the season. Plaza De Toros (The Matador ride) is added to the kiddie sub-section of the Spanish Section. The Matador Ride replaced the Fort Cannons where guests would fire wax cannonballs out of cannons in front of the fort at a model of another fort in the little stream that flowed in front of the fort. Part of the stream was partially filled in (with a small pedestrian bridge crossing the remaining part of the stream) to place this ride in the park. This allowed for a new pathway (going between The Matador and Jumping Frijolies rides) that tied the kiddie section into Carousel Hill. On this path a Puppet Show wagon (similar to the Buford Buzzard wagon) was added. The petting Zoo was altered removing the Pyramid structure from over the entrance way.
- 1978: Added Mind Bender at a cost of 2.5 million dollars. Mind Bender was designed by Anton Schwartzkopf of Musterhausen, West Germany (builder). The creator was W Stengel of Munich, Germany. "The World's only triple-loop rollercoaster is a one-of-a-kind thrill ride, each train, holding 28 passengers, catapults through 3 loops (two verticular) and travels up to 50 miles per hour. It has a "G" force of 5.4. Height of loops-56 linear feet and track length-3,370 linear feet. Weight of steel structure is 400,000 lbs. Length of ride 2 minutes 33 seconds". Mo-Mo the Monster ride is relocated to the former site of the Sky Hook.
- 1979: Added Highland Swings (Chance Yo-Yo). The Bicentennial Theatre is renamed the Contemporary Theatre.
- 1980: Added Jolly Roger's Island, a new pirate themed area featuring The Flying Dutchman pirate ship. The Flying Dutchman opened March 13 at a cost of 1/2 million dollars. It was designed by A.G. Giovanola Freres for Intamin AG, Zurich, Switzerland. The Dutchman traveled 86 feet through a 150 degree arc reaching a maximum height in swing of 66 feet. The ship was 46 foot long, 9 foot wide, and sat 50 guests with a ride time of 2 minutes.
- 1981: Jean Ribault's Adventure is closed. Tales of the Okefenokee is removed and replaced with The Monster Plantation at a cost in excess of 3 million dollars. The ride was designed by Gary Goddard Productions of Los Angeles, CA and the technical side handled by AVG Productions of Valencia, CA. The original Astro Lift, which carried guests between the Confederacy and United States sections, is removed at the end of the season.
- 1982: Added Thunder River, made by Intamin AG (in the area formerly occupied by Jean Ribaut's Adventure ride) at a cost of 4 million dollars. The design began in 1979 with the structure being done by Bernard Johnson, INC (Atlanta).
- 1983: Added Freefall in the spring. Ten stories tall, made by Intamin AG at a cost of 3.3 million dollars. Relocated Mo-Mo the Monster to Cotton States Exposition Section in the former spot of The Phlying Phlurpus. Six Flags was purchased by the video game manufacturer Bally, as a result the Spanish fort was turned into the Pac-Man Playfort. The playfort opened in March and was designed by Jack Pentes. It included Pipeline Crawl, Boppity Bags, Walk On Water, Ball Bath, King of the Mountain and more. The cost was a half million dollars.
- 1984: Added The Great Six Flags Air Racer in the British section in the spring at a cost of 2 million (1984) dollars. This ride took riders to a height of 100 feet (the tower was 135 ft (41 m) tall). The 12 six passenger planes traveled at a mere 35 mph (56 km/h). It was an Intamin Super Racer ride. The length of the ride was 2 minutes 30 seconds. Hallmark's "Shirt Tales" characters are the park mascots for the season (apparently hanging in the next season as well even though the Looney Tunes start their takeover), as a result they move into the Character Theatre in the kiddie section. The Contemporary Theatre is renamed the Olympic Theatre.
- 1985: Added Looping Starship. The attraction was removed after the end of the season because it was on a ride rotation schedule with other Six Flags parks. Relocated Wheelie to the Lickskillet section on the former spot of the Drunken Barrels. Horror Cave is removed at the end of the season. Looney Tunes characters become the park mascots. As a result, the Pac-Man Playfort is renamed Yosemite Sam Playfort. The Olympic Theatre is renamed The Looney Tunes Theatre.
- 1986: Added Splashwater Falls, a shoot-the-chutes-style water ride. Due to a lightning strike SFOG temporarily replaced Mo-Mo the Monster with "The Great American Force", a trailer version of a Morgan Super Round-Up. It was removed before Halloweekends began, serving only 2–3 months in the park. As the Shirt Tales exited at the end of last season, the theatre is turned over to the Bill Clary Show.
- 1987: Mo-Mo the Monster was returned to the park. The Dahlonega Mine Train is refurbished by the O.D. Hopkins Corporation during the season. Bally sells its Six Flags interest to Wesray Capitol and a group of Six Flags managers (Wesray 80% and Managers 20%). Total sale 610 million dollars.
- 1988: Added Z-Force which is relocated from Six Flags Great America. Attraction opened late spring. The Mini-Mine Train is removed at the end of the season.
- 1989: Looping Starship is returned to the park in its original location. This was not the same exact ride but a sister ship. This ride was purchased from a park in Canada. The Convoy replaces the Mini-Mine Train.
- 1990: Added Georgia Cyclone. Hanson Cars (made by Arrow Dynamics) relocated to Carousel Hill. Log Flume #1 is removed at the end of the season.
- 1991: Ragin Rivers, a wet-dry waterslide tower, is added in place of Log Jamboree flume #1. Z-Force is removed and relocated to Six Flags Magic Mountain at the end of the season. Mo-Mo the Monster is removed at the end of the season.
- 1992: Added Ninja, relocated from Conko's Party Pier in New Jersey.
- 1993: Added Axis Arena. Initially home to a Batman-themed stunt show, the arena now hosts concerts and other events.
- 1994: Looney Tunes Land becomes Bugs Bunny World, renaming all the rides in the area and removing Road Runner Runaround.
- 1995: Added Viper, the former Tidal Wave from Six Flags Great America. Ultrazone indoor laser tag added to Jolly Rogers Island.
- 1996: Added Feerless Freep's Daredevil Dive (Skycoaster).
- 1997: Added Batman: The Ride. Jolly Roger's Island transforms into Gotham City, including a repaint for Mind Bender in green/black paint scheme to match the Riddler. Highland Swings and Flying Dutchman pirate ship removed. Black Friar restaurant becomes Whistlin' Dixie.
- 1998: Park entrance remodeled to become The Promenade. Back park entrance closes. Ragin' Rivers removed.
- 1999: Added Georgia Scorcher. Goldtown Racers (go-karts) added to former location of the park back entrance.
- 2000: The Great Six Flags Air Racer is removed at the end of the season.
- 2001: Added Acrophobia and Déjà Vu. Removal of Viper. Log Jamboree #2 renamed Deer Park Plunge. Tweety's Clubhouse added to Bugs Bunny World.
- 2002: Added Superman Ultimate Flight.
- 2003: Viper is relocated from storage to Six Flags Kentucky Kingdom and renamed Greazed Lightnin'. Viper has now been cut-up and sold for scrap.
- 2004: A group of five family-style rides is added throughout the park, including the Wile E. Coyote Canyon Blaster roller coaster; Rockin' Tug; Up, Up & Away; The Gotham City Crime Wave & Shake, Rattle and Roll (in the former Chevy Show Cinema building) .
- 2005: Added Skull Island, a water-park play fort. Removal of Great Gasp and Looping Starship. Whistlin' Dixie restaurant becomes Panda Express.
- 2006: Added Goliath. Deer Park Plunge renamed Log Jamboree. Removal of Free Fall after end of season.
- 2007: Déjà Vu closed after the end of the season.
- 2008: Adds Thomas Town, based on Thomas the Tank Engine. Which was rethemed in 2011 as Whistlestop Park. Before 2012, Whistlestop Train was removed from the park. Tondee's Tavern becomes Johnny Rockets.
- 2009: Renovation of The Monster Plantation into The Monster Mansion, with new characters and storyline.
- 2010: Batman the Ride repainted cobalt blue with dark blue supports. Shake Rattle And Roll removed for installation of Dare Devil Dive. Fearless Freep’s Dare Devil Dive is renamed to Sky Coaster to prevent confusion with the new Dare Devil Dive coaster planned for the following year.
- 2011: Adds Dare Devil Dive Euro-Fighter roller coaster.
- 2012: Wheelie removed at the end of the season.
- 2013: SkyScreamer, a 242-foot-tall swing ride, is added in place of the Wheelie. Six Flags removes the Southern Star Amphitheater at the end of the season.
- 2014: Six Flags Hurricane Harbor and Holiday in the Park added. Hurricane Harbor is a new water park area replacing the Southern Star Amphitheater and included with park admission. Hurricane Harbor features an 800,000 US gallons (3,000,000 L) wave pool and two slide towers, along with new dining facilities and the existing Skull Island complex. Hurricane Harbor represented the first phase of a multi-year expansion program for the park. Holiday in the Park, a new Christmas event, will extend the park's season through January.
- 2015: Improvements to Gotham City, including a pair of flat rides: The Joker: Chaos Coaster, a Larson Giant Loop, and Harley Quinn Spinsanity, a Tilt-A-Whirl.
- 2016: Bugs Bunny World re-themed into Bugs Bunny Boomtown. DC Super Friends area added adjacent to Boomtown. Combined 12 new and re-themed attractions. Toro Toro, Swing Seville and Little Aviator removed. Ninja repainted blue and gray and renamed Blue Hawk in June 2016. The Dodge City Bumper Cars attraction closes permanently on June 16, 2016.
- 2017: Justice League: Battle for Metropolis, an interactive dark ride adjacent to Superman Ultimate Flight, scheduled to open late May. Cotton States Exposition re-themed to Metropolis, with the Great American Scream Machine and Blue Hawk roller coasters becoming part of Lickskillet. Georgia Cyclone closed permanently on July 30, 2017.
- 2018: A steel hybrid coaster called Twisted Cyclone opened on May 25, 2018. Previously known as Georgia Cyclone, a wooden roller coaster constructed in 1990, some of the original structure was left in place and heavily modified to make the new coaster. Old Georgia Cyclone trains added to Great American Scream Machine. Splashwater Falls closes and is left SBNO.
- 2019: A Zamperla Giant Discovery called Pandemonium opened on May 24, 2019.
- 2020: Two new flat rides added to Gotham City: Poison Ivy: Toxic Spin, a Scrambler; and Catwoman Whip, a Zamperla Endeavour. Mind Bender is refurbished and renamed Riddler Mindbender, although it stays closed during the season.
- 2021: The Riddler Mindbender reopens in the spring of 2021. Sky Buckets is removed from the park after staying closed for much of the previous season. Demolition began on Splashwater Falls in May 2021, and completely been taken down in June 2021.
- 2022: The Joker: Chaos Coaster is removed.
- 2023: Kid Flash Cosmic Coaster opens.
- 2024: Goliath is repainted. Kid Flash Cosmic Coaster, Skycoaster and Goldtown Racers(go karts) are removed.
- 2025: Georgia Goldrusher opens.

== Incidents ==
Over the years, a number of incidents have occurred at the park, including some fatalities. Two individuals have passed away at Batman: The Ride in nearly identical incidents, where individuals were underneath the attraction while it was operational and were struck and killed by the train itself or by the riders' exposed legs.

Portions of Six Flags Over Georgia lie within the flood plain of the Chattahoochee River, which has caused occasional problems whenever the river overflows its banks. Most recently, in September 2009, the park suffered severe flooding, as did much of the surrounding area. The bulk of the flooding occurred during the week, at a point in the season when the park was closed on weekdays. The park managed to clean up the damage and open as normal the following weekend.

On March 2, 2024, police were called to the park by Six Flags Over Georgia security to help disperse "a sizeable unruly crowd" of 500 to 600 people "running through the park and fighting", Cobb County police said in a statement. According to the Georgia Bureau of Investigations, multiple people began shooting, hitting an unoccupied CCPD marked patrol car. During the incident, one CCPD officer fired his weapon, striking a 15-year-old who was subsequently charged with criminal conduct and aggravated assault on an officer.

On October 12, 2026, around 3:58 PM, a 42-year-old man was killed after being ejected from his seat while riding Goliath. Four other riders were injured in the incident after he hit the train three times while falling. Six Flags subsequently and temporarily closed multiple rides at its parks across the United States and Canada.

== Gallery ==
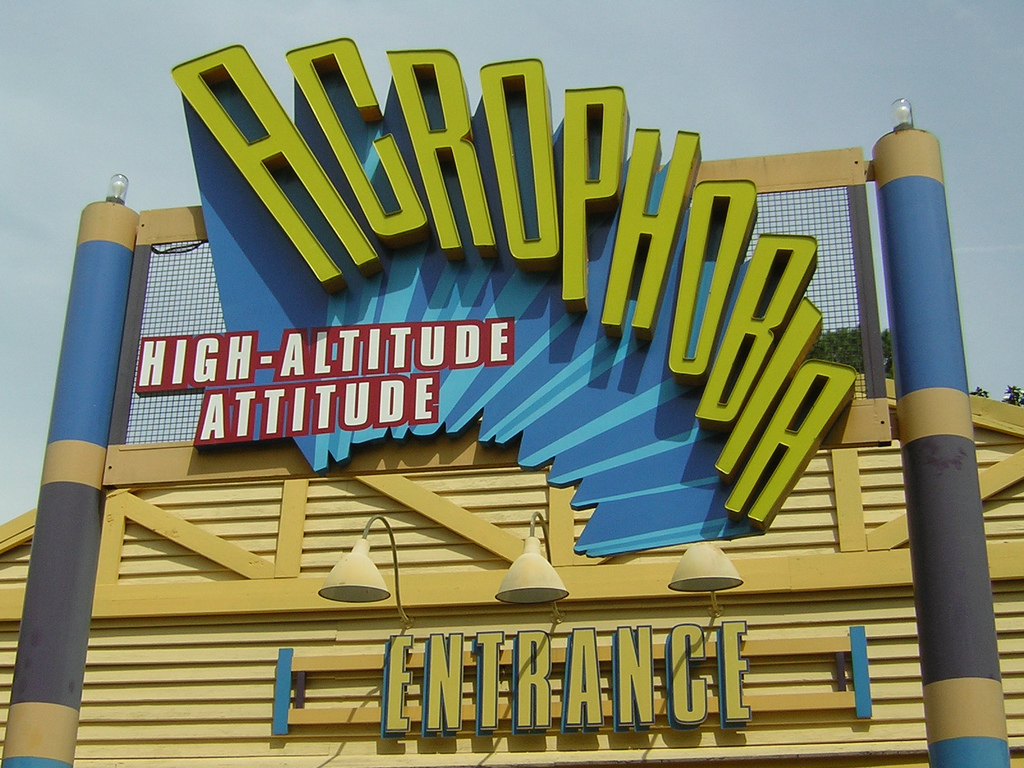
Acrophobia

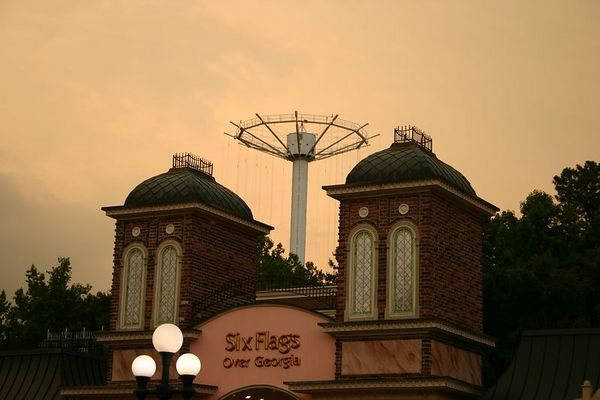
Great Gasp entrance

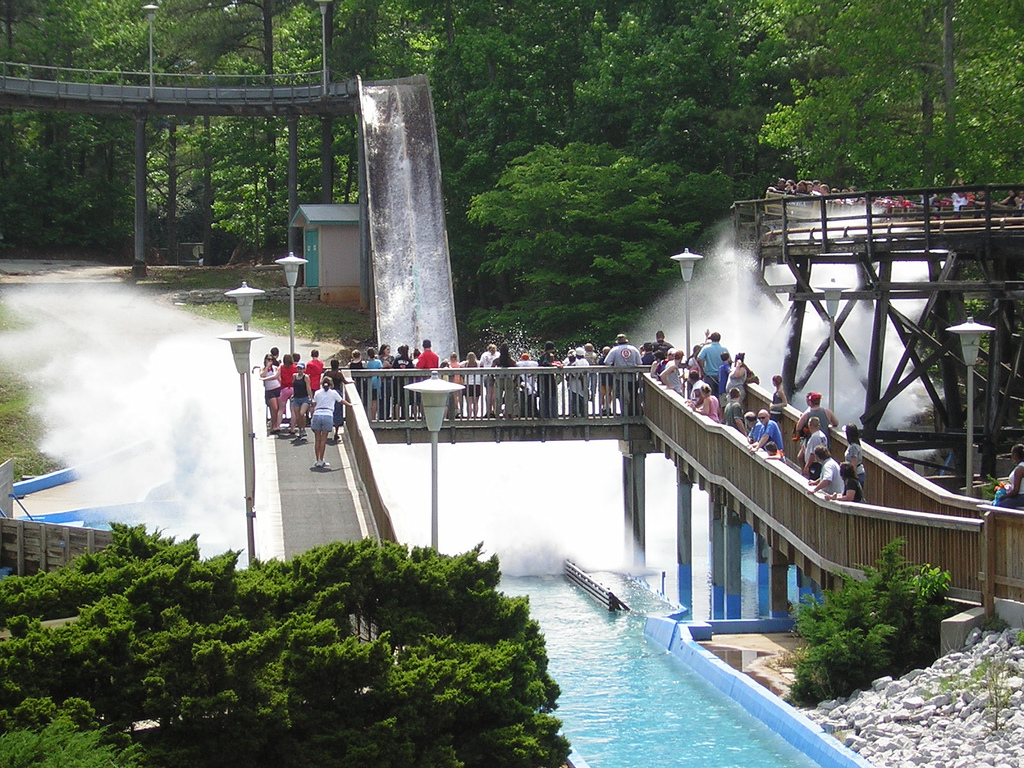
Splashwater Falls

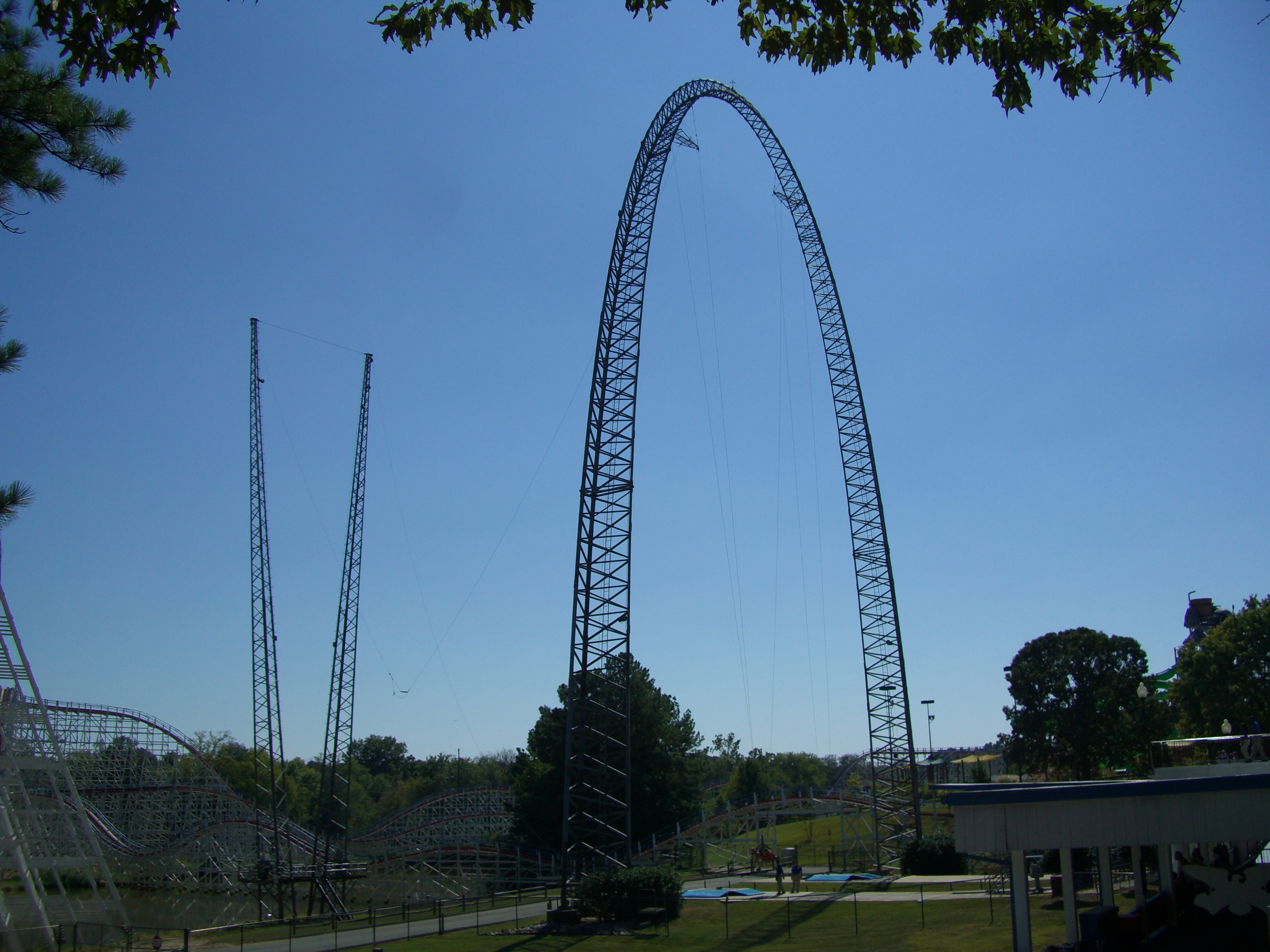
Skycoaster

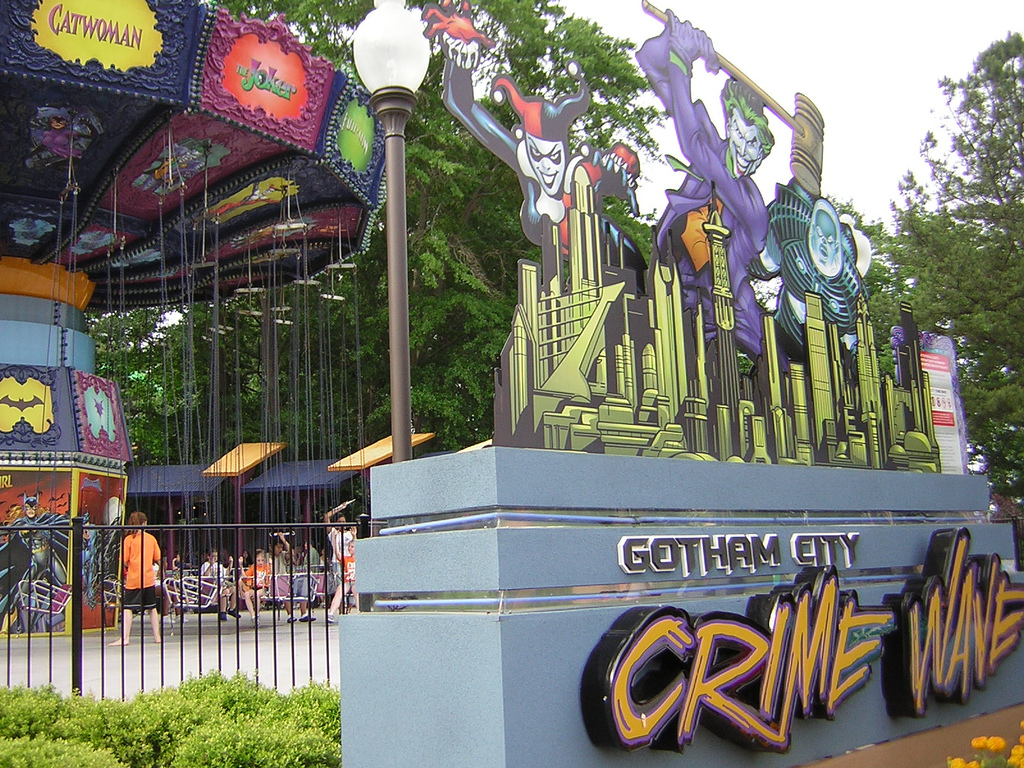
Gotham City Crime Wave

== See also ==
- Incidents at Six Flags parks
- Great Gasp
- Roller coasters
- Amusement Parks
- Six Flags Parks
