= Georgia Gold Rusher =

Roller coaster at Six Flags Over Georgia

Six Flags Over Georgia
- Location: Six Flags Over Georgia
- Park section: Lickskillet
- Coordinates: 33°46′02.5″N 84°33′04.7″W
- Status: Closed
- Opening date: March 15, 2025
- Cost: $13,000,000
- Replaced: Splashwater Falls

General statistics
- Type: Steel – Shuttle – Launched
- Manufacturer: Intamin
- Model: Ultra Surf
- Track layout: Out and Back
- Height: 144 ft (44 m)
- Length: 590 ft (180 m)
- Speed: 60 mph (97 km/h)
- Height restriction: 48 in (122 cm)
- Trains: Single train with 2 cars, each seating 10 for a total of 20 riders per train
- Georgia Gold Rusher at RCDB

Georgia Gold Rusher is a steel launched shuttle roller coaster at Six Flags Over Georgia in Austell, Georgia, that opened on March 15, 2025.

== History ==
=== Origins ===
Liechtenstein-based Intamin first revealed their upgraded Ultra Surf roller coaster concept in July 2021, allowing the rotating vehicles to traverse a shuttle track and interact with water features. The first of these would have gone to NovaWorld Phan Thiet, a new theme and water park resort in Bình Thuận province, Vietnam. The planned adventure park however was unexpectedly cancelled, and in December 2022 the project's intended collection of rides – including the coaster – were listed for sale.

In response to November 2022's plummeting attendance figures and tensions with shareholders, then-Six Flags leadership began purchasing whatever attractions they could have delivered to their parks as quickly as possible. While Kid Flash Cosmic Coaster was procured due to the manufacturer's flexibility, the chain worked with Vekoma to secure coasters that had already been manufactured for cancelled international projects, such as Rookie Racer at Six Flags St. Louis, Siren's Curse at Cedar Point and The Flash: Vertical Velocity at Six Flags Great Adventure. Intamin's Ultra Surf coaster itself had already been partially manufactured, with some hardware having already been delivered to Vietnam and the rest remaining at Stakotra Manufacturing in Piešťany, Slovakia.

=== Announcement and Construction ===
Six Flags Over Georgia commenced demolition of the remaining Splashwater Falls concrete pool in June 2023; the former Hopkins Rides Shoot the chute had operated at the park from 1986 to 2018. Leading up to the announcement, park social media cryptically referred to actions such as "launch" and "spinning". A faux cargo box was placed in the park, featuring stamps from five different countries; they were eventually determined to be locations of Intamin's offices.

On August 19, 2023, the park announced a new unnamed roller coaster for the 2024 season, the first-of-its-kind type of coaster to their park. A naming contest was held; more than 2,500 suggestions were submitted and later narrowed down to three, with Georgia Surfer emerging as the winner in February 2024.

On August 12, 2024, Six Flags Over Georgia announced on their social media that the roller coaster had been postponed until 2025. The park blamed the delay on supply chain issues and challenges associated with developing the prototype, but assured that it would be ready for their seasonal opening in 2025.

In January 2025, the park announced a rename of the roller coaster. The ride opened on March 15, 2025.

In July 2026, Six Flags announced that the coaster would be closed for the remainder of the 2026 season in order for Intamin to make enhancements to the train. The ride is set to reopen in the 2027 season.

== Ride experience ==
Georgia Gold Rusher is 144 feet (44 m) in height, reaches a maximum speed of 60 miles per hour (97 km/h), and has a track length of 590 feet (180 m). The ride features one train with two circular cars that each seats 10 riders.

The roller coaster launches forward and backwards along the track, reaching speeds of 60 miles per hour (97 km/h) during its course. At the ending of the ride, the coaster train will feature a splashdown in a pool of water.
