= Riverview Carousel at Six Flags Over Georgia =

Restored antique carousel in Six Flags Over Georgia

- U.S. National Register of Historic Places
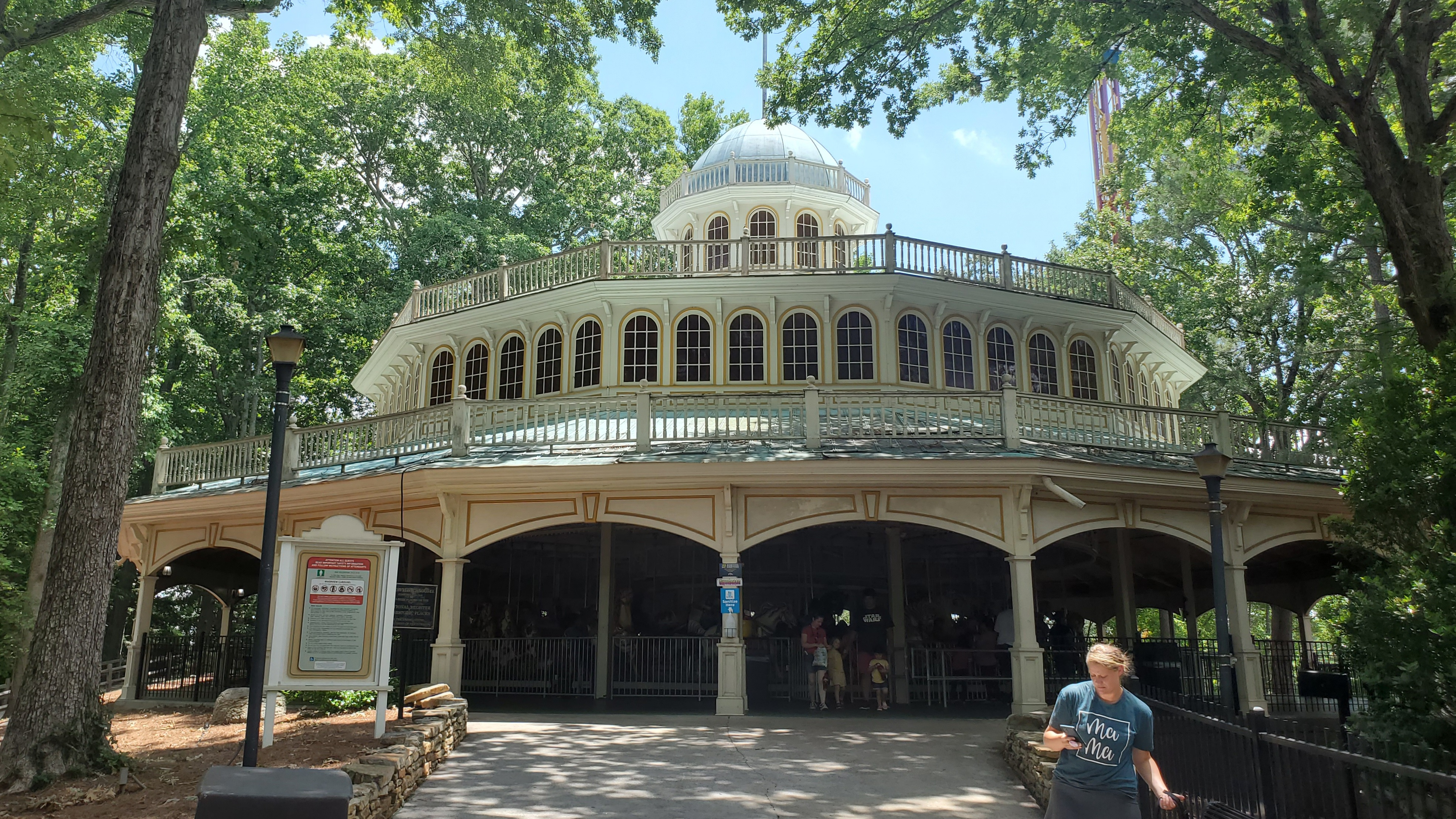
- Location: Austell, Georgia
- Coordinates: 33.7669°N 84.5507°W
- Built: 1908
- Architect: Philadelphia Toboggan Company
- NRHP reference No.: 94001639
- Added to NRHP: January 27, 1995

The Riverview Carousel at Six Flags Over Georgia is an antique carousel at Six Flags Over Georgia in Austell, Georgia. It was built in 1908 by the Philadelphia Toboggan Company (PTC) as Carousel No. 17 and was added to the National Register of Historic Places in 1995. It contains four wood-carved chariots and 69 wood-carved carousel horses arranged in five rows around the carousel's center. The Riverview Carousel is one of only four 5-row carousels built by PTC and one of only two that survive, the other being the Prince Charming Regal Carrousel (PTC No. 46) in Magic Kingdom within Walt Disney World in Bay Lake, Florida.

== See also ==
- Amusement rides on the National Register of Historic Places
- National Register of Historic Places listings in Cobb County, Georgia
