= Acrophobia (ride) =

Drop tower at Six Flags Over Georgia

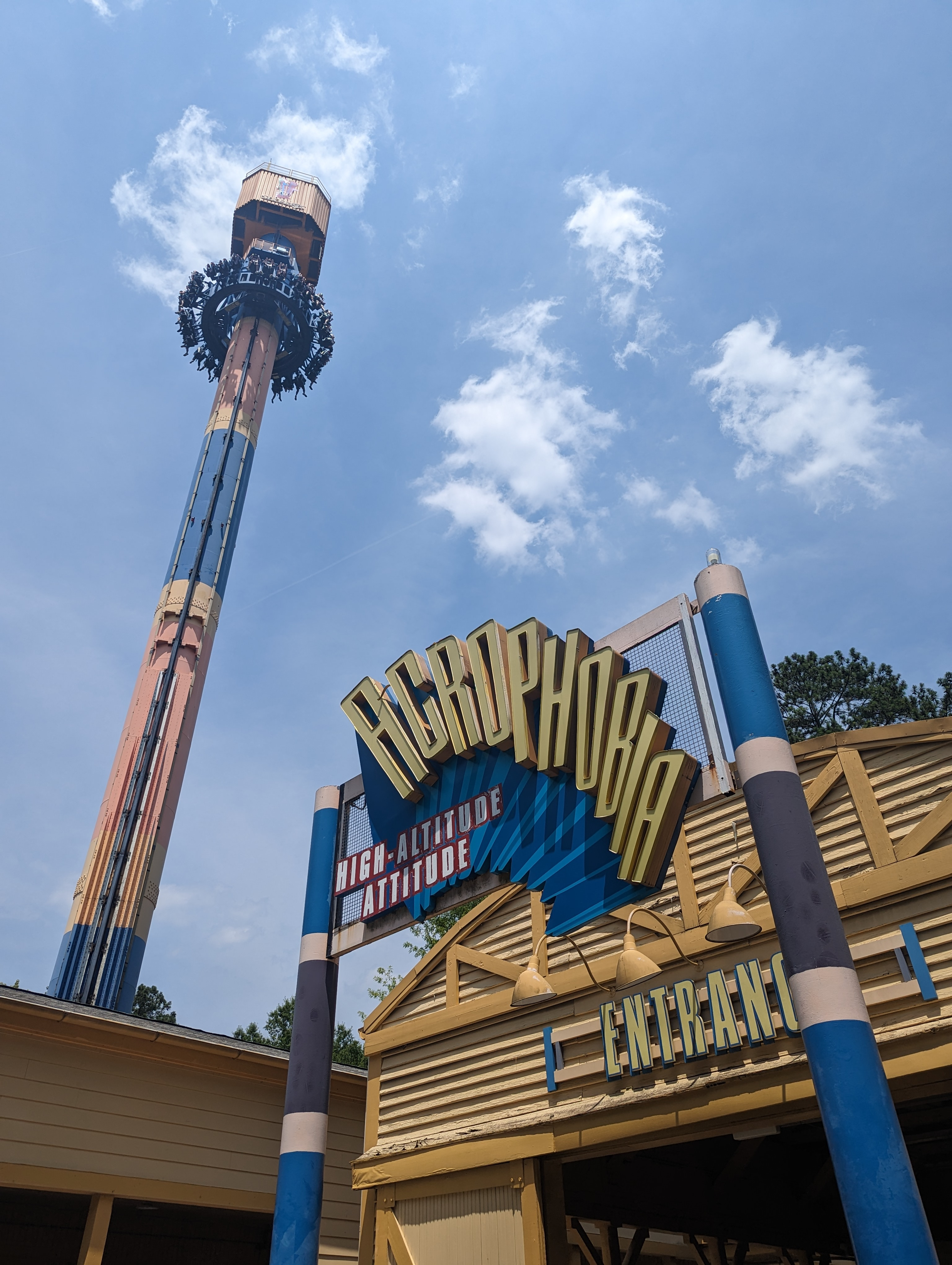
- View of Acrophobia at Six Flags Over Georgia

Six Flags Over Georgia
- Area: Peachtree Square
- Status: Operating
- Opening date: May 12, 2001; 25 years ago

Ride statistics
- Attraction type: Free-fall tower ride
- Manufacturer: Intamin
- Height: 200 ft (61 m)
- Drop: 161 ft (49 m)
- Speed: 50 mph (80 km/h)
- Vehicles: 1
- Riders per vehicle: 30
- Height restriction: 52 in (132 cm)
- Fast Lane available

Acrophobia is a free-fall tower ride located at Six Flags Over Georgia in Austell, Georgia. The attraction was designed by Intamin of Switzerland, and is marketed by Intamin's Liechtenstein-based subsidiary Ride Trade. When Acrophobia opened to the public on May 12, 2001, it became the first free-fall attraction of its kind in the world.

== History ==
Acrophobia was manufactured by Intamin and opened on May 12, 2001.

Acrophobia was temporarily closed on June 22, 2007, after an accident occurred on Superman: Tower of Power at Kentucky Kingdom when a 13-year-old girl had her feet severed by a faulty cable.

In March 2017, the park announced that the ride would receive a virtual reality experience called "Drop of Doom VR" that opened on the ride on March 11, 2017.

== Attraction design & ride experience ==
Acrophobia is a significant modification to the Gyro Drop model, marketed as the "Floorless, Tilting Gyro Drop". Instead of being seated on the round ride gondola, riders are fastened into special harnesses that partially resemble large bicycle seats. These harnesses allow the riders' legs to dangle freely.

As the ride cycle begins, a winch system grabs the gondola and lifts it upwards. Shortly after, the gondola begins to slowly rotate, completing one revolution before reaching the top of the tower. As it approaches the top, pneumatic pistons behind the harnesses tilt the seats outwards by roughly 15 degrees. After a short delay, the winch releases the gondola, allowing it to free-fall back to the ground, where an array of braking systems slows it down and eventually allows it to come to a full stop, thus completing the cycle.

Acrophobia is just over 200 feet (61 m) in height, though the actual drop height of the ride is approximately 161 feet (49 m).

== Safety systems ==
Riders are held in place by over the shoulder harnesses with safety belts.

The bulk of these features are concentrated at the base of the attraction; foremost among these is the tower's permanent magnet braking system. These brakes slow down the falling gondola gently, yet rapidly, without actually contacting the gondola. These magnets do not require electricity to produce their magnetic fields, and as such they are able to function even in the event of a total power failure. Lastly, pneumatic plungers "catch" the slowly descending gondola and allow it to settle to the tower base. Like the magnetic brakes, these plungers do not require power to function properly. Acrophobia requires the rider to be at least 52 inches tall.
