= Twisted Cyclone =

Roller coaster at Six Flags Over Georgia

- Previously known as Georgia Cyclone (1990–2017)
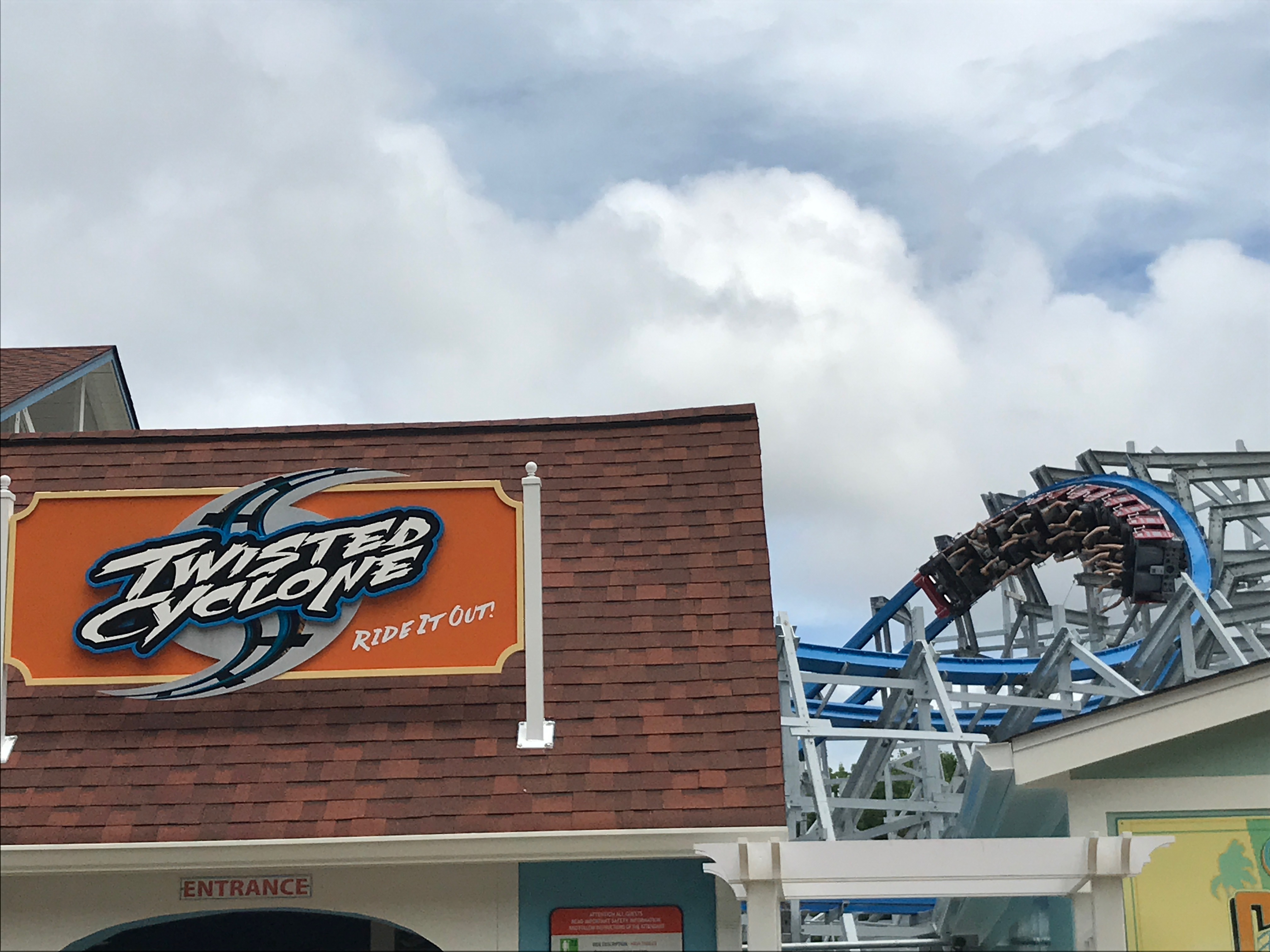

Six Flags Over Georgia
- Location: Six Flags Over Georgia
- Coordinates: 33°46′13″N 84°33′08″W
- Status: Operating
- Opening date: May 25, 2018
- Replaced: Georgia Cyclone

General statistics
- Type: Steel
- Manufacturer: Rocky Mountain Construction
- Designer: Alan Schilke
- Model: I-Box
- Lift/launch system: Chain
- Height: 100 ft (30 m)
- Length: 2,400 ft (730 m)
- Speed: 50 mph (80 km/h)
- Inversions: 3
- Max vertical angle: 75°
- Height restriction: 48 in (122 cm)
- Trains: 2 trains with 6 cars; riders arranged 2 across in 2 rows for a total of 24 riders per train
- Website: Official site
- Fast Lane available
- Twisted Cyclone at RCDB

Twisted Cyclone, formerly known as Georgia Cyclone, is a steel roller coaster located at Six Flags Over Georgia in Mableton, Georgia. Manufactured by Rocky Mountain Construction (RMC), the ride opened to the public on May 25, 2018. It features RMC's patented I-Box Track technology and utilizes a significant portion of Georgia Cyclone's former support structure. Originally constructed by the Dinn Corporation, Georgia Cyclone first opened on March 3, 1990.

== History ==
Georgia Cyclone opened as a mirror image of the Coney Island Cyclone on March 3, 1990. It stood ten feet higher than the Coney Island Cyclone at 95 feet (29 m), had a track length of 2,970 feet (910 m), and reached a top speed of 50 miles per hour (80 km/h). For the 2012 season, approximately 30 percent of the coaster's track was replaced with Topper Track by Rocky Mountain Construction (RMC), intended to provide an improved ride experience. On July 17, 2017, park officials announced that the attraction would close permanently two weeks later on July 30.

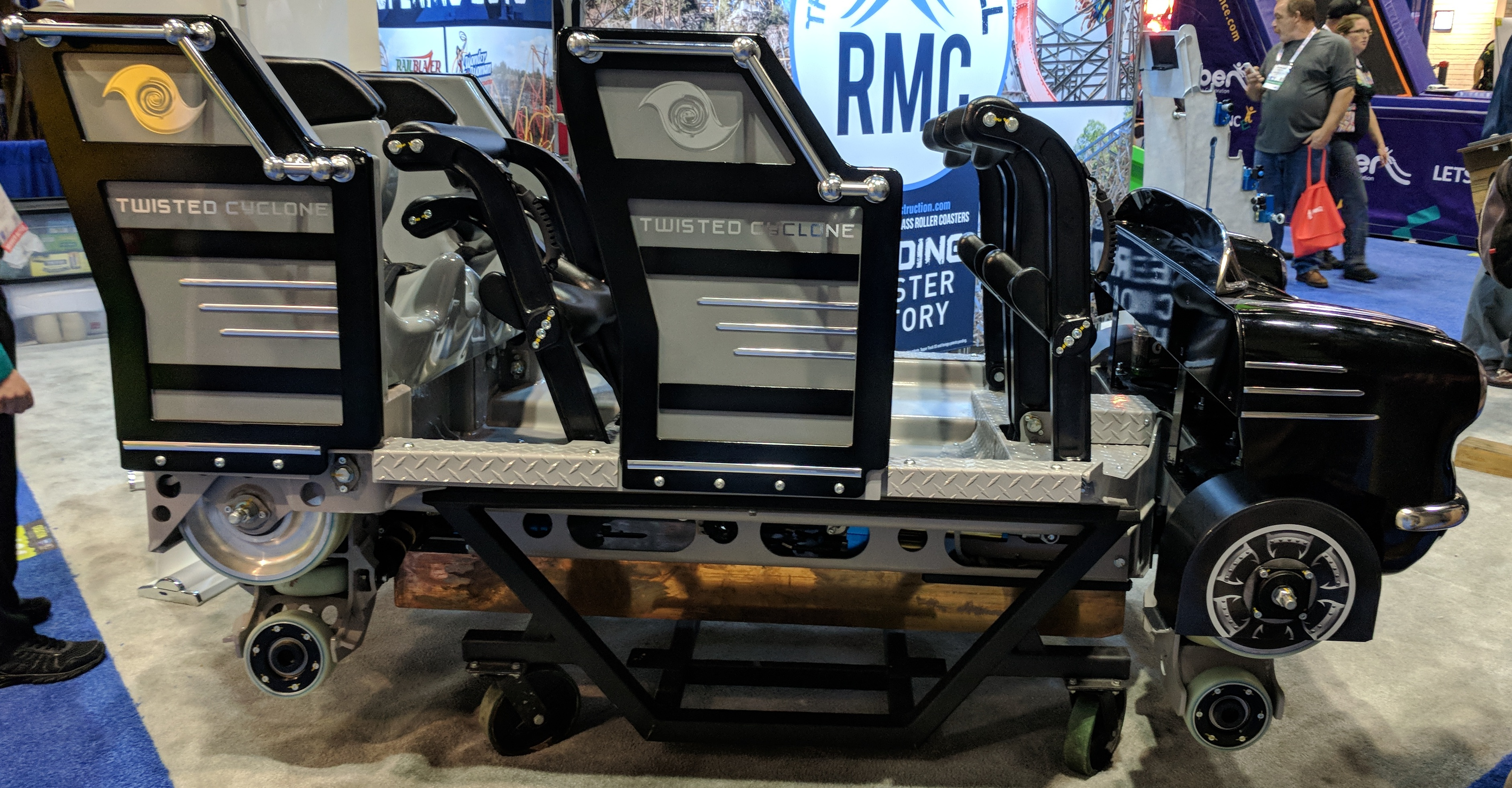
Twisted Cyclone car on display at IAAPA IAE (2017)

On August 31, 2017, Six Flags Over Georgia announced plans to convert Georgia Cyclone into a steel-hybrid design called Twisted Cyclone, featuring RMC's patented I-Box Track technology. The drop height was raised to 100 feet (30 m), the angle was steepened to 75 degrees, and a total of ten airtime hills and three inversions were added along the ride's course. The trains' theme was modified to represent a 1960s-era sports convertible, and the maximum speed remained unchanged at 50 mph (80 km/h). The track was shortened to approximately 2,400 feet (730 m), and the roller coaster held its grand opening on May 25, 2018.

== Ride layout ==
=== Georgia Cyclone (1990–2017) ===
Upon leaving the station, riders made a left hand turnaround into the lift hill, which took the train up to a peak height of 95-foot (29 m). Riders were immediately sent down a 78.5-foot (23.9 m) drop at a 53° angle; at the bottom of the drop, riders came close to the track above for a headchopper effect. The train then rose up into the first high-speed U-turn to the right, descended again beneath the lift hill and rising into a camelback airtime hill. The train entered a left-hand turnaround, which was then followed by another airtime hill and third left turnaround. Riders navigated another pair of turns under the structure with a series of smaller hills under the main structure before making a final flat turn over the bottom of the first drop, leading into the brake run. From there, the train passed through the transfer track and made its way into the station. A ride on the Georgia Cyclone lasted approximately 1 minute and 48 seconds.

=== Twisted Cyclone (2018–present) ===
Upon leaving the station, the train proceeds through several twisted bunny hills while making a left-hand turnaround into the 100-foot (30 m) lift hill. At the top, riders are released into a drop at 75° and rise into the first of three inversions; a so-called step-up-under-flip. The train sweeps to the right through the turnaround and exit through a barrel roll down drop inversion, which is identical to the first inversion minus the train's direction. The train passes through a wall stall facing away from the lift hill and a hasty turnaround wave turn. Another airtime hill leads to the layout's third and final inversion - a zero-g roll - and a pair of low-ground airtime hills before entering the final left-hand turnaround. Another small airtime hill follows, and riders dip up into the final brake run, which leads back to the station. From dispatch to brake run, one ride on Twisted Cyclone lasts approximately 1 minute and 20 seconds.

== Awards ==
Golden Ticket Awards: Top wood Roller Coasters
Year									1998	1999
Ranking									12	9
Year	2000	2001	2002	2003	2004	2005	2006	2007	2008	2009
Ranking	13	16	14	18	20	22 (tie)	31	43	40 (tie)	44
Year	2010	2011	2012	2013	2014	2015	2016	2017	2018	2019
Ranking	47 (tie)	—	—	—	–	–	–	–	–	–
Year	2020	2021	2022	2023	2024	2025	2026			
Ranking	N/A	–	–	–	–	–	–			
