= Dahlonega Mine Train =

Roller coaster at Six Flags Over Georgia

- The front entrance of the attraction

Six Flags Over Georgia
- Location: Six Flags Over Georgia
- Park section: Peachtree Square
- Coordinates: 33.767569°N 84.551924°W
- Status: Operating
- Opening date: June 16, 1967

General statistics
- Type: Steel – Mine train
- Manufacturer: Arrow Dynamics
- Model: Mine train
- Track layout: Terrain
- Lift/launch system: Three chain lift hills
- Height: 37 ft (11 m)
- Length: 2,327 ft (709 m)
- Speed: 29 mph (47 km/h)
- Duration: 2:51
- Max vertical angle: 45°
- Capacity: 2200 riders per hour
- Height restriction: 48 in (122 cm)
- Trains: 4 (max. 3 in operation) trains with 5 cars; riders arranged 2 across in 3 rows for a total of 30 riders per train
- Fast Lane available
- Dahlonega Mine Train at RCDB

Dahlonega Mine Train is a mine train roller coaster located at Six Flags Over Georgia in Mableton, Georgia, 12 miles (19 km) west of downtown Atlanta, Georgia. The ride has three lift hills with brief elements between each that wind through a wooded, hilly landscape. This is a family coaster that is named after Dahlonega, Georgia, a village in northern Georgia that was a center of the gold rush of 1828, the first gold rush in the United States of America.

== Operational information ==
When opened in 1967, the Dahlonega Mine Train had the capability to run four trains at once, the reason for its high capacity. In the mid-1990s, however, the O. D. Hopkins Company rebuilt and refurbished the ride, replacing some wooden supports with steel, retracking and a fully computerized control system. This new system is not capable of running four trains at once (three is the current maximum number of trains during normal operation). Thus, the stated capacity of 2200 riders per hour is inaccurate. With three trains, the capacity is 1300 riders per hour, with two trains it is 800 riders per hour and with one train it is 500 riders per hour.

As with most modern roller coasters, a block system keeps trainsets moving and prevents trains from colliding with each other. Rarely, trains will "roll back" into the tunnel from the end of the station platform. The control program is set up to handle this problem so that another train cannot collide with the stalled train. When this happens, guests are unloaded in the tunnel (which has lights and a stairway for such an event) and a winch pulls the empty train back into the station.

Trains feature a single lap bar in each row actuated by depressing a foot pedal near the front of each car, done by a station attendant. Unlike many roller coasters, though, there are no upstop wheels to prevent the trains from leaving the track; instead there is only a flange (upstop pad) which achieves the same result. This is common on "mine train" type roller coasters.

== Ride experience ==
The ride begins with the train leaving the station passing under a walkway, going down a small hill and turning left into the enclosed transfer track area. From there it turns right and climbs the first lift. After clearing the lift hill, the train turns right and descends into a trench while completing a U-turn. This is the "figure 8" area of the track. After that, it rides through the "b" dips featuring 2 camel back humps. Then the train turns left then right and approaches the second lift hill. Next, it climbs the second lift and turns left into the "mini horseshoe", which leads into a right turn downward spiral. From the spiral, it rides over the "c" dip, turns right and climbs the third lift hill. After clearing the third, and final lift, it turns left into the "big horseshoe" and enters an elevated barn enclosure. When the train nears the end of the enclosure, it descends into a tunnel, reaching its actual top speed of 35 mph and completes an elongated S-shaped element, starting with a left turn (left right left). From there it pops back above ground, slightly turns left and slowly enters back into the station.

== Tunnel ==
The tunnel has flooded on occasion over the years. A massive flood occurred in September 2009, which covered a large portion of the entire property.
