= Dahlonega (YTB-770) =

Tugboat of the United States Navy

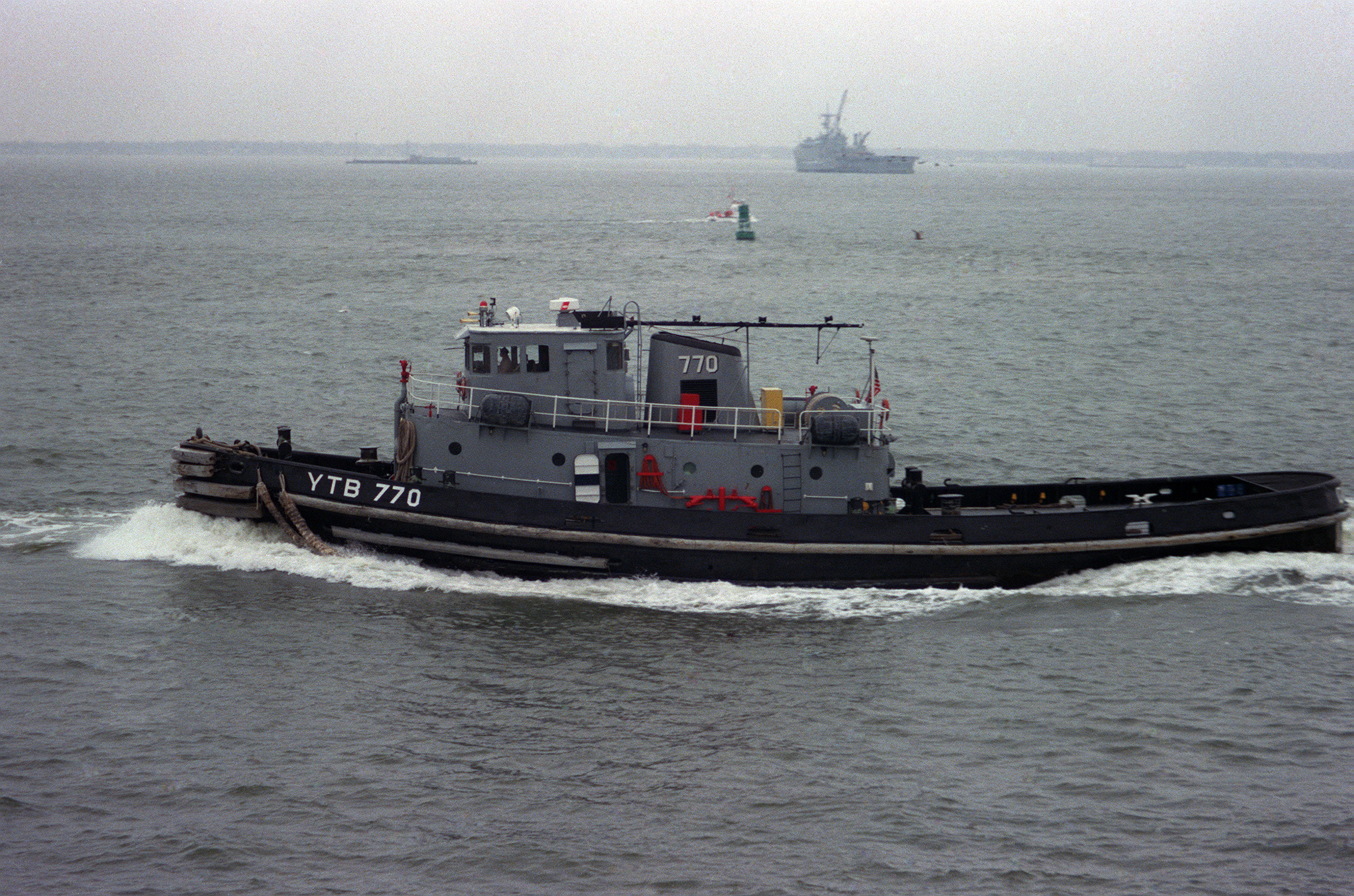
- Dahlonega (YTB-770) underway off the end of Pier 12 at NOB Norfolk, VA., 1 March 1989.

History

United States
- Awarded: 18 January 1963
- Builder: Mobile Ship Repair
- Laid down: 4 November 1963
- Launched: 23 March 1964
- Acquired: 4 August 1964
- Stricken: 13 March 2001
- Identification: IMO number: 8980878
- Status: In civilian service as Ontario

General characteristics
- Class & type: Natick-class large harbor tug
- Displacement: 283 long tons (288 t) (light); 356 long tons (362 t) (full)
- Length: 109 ft (33 m)
- Beam: 31 ft (9.4 m)
- Draft: 14 ft (4.3 m)
- Propulsion: Diesel engine, single screw
- Speed: 12 knots (14 mph; 22 km/h)
- Complement: 12

Dahlonega (YTB-770) was a United States Navy Natick-class large harbor tug.

== Construction ==
The contract for Dahlonega was awarded 18 January 1963. She was laid down on 4 November 1963 at Mobile, Alabama, by Mobile Ship Repair and launched 23 March 1964.

== Operational history ==
Dahlonega was placed in service in the 5th Naval District, at Norfolk, Virginia. She served there until she was stricken from the Navy Directory 12 March 2001. Ex-Dahlonega was sold by the Defense Reutilization and Marketing Service 16 July 2001 to McAllister Towing for $141,000 and renamed Jeffrey McAllister. In 2015 McAllister sold her to the Great Lakes Towing Company, who renamed her Ontario.
