= Project Purple (disambiguation) =

Project Purple may refer to:

- Project Purple, an album by Yungen
- Project Purple, the codename for the iPhone (1st generation)
- Project Purple 2, the codename for the iPad (1st generation)
- Project Purple, the codename for Bakunawa, a roller coaster at Six Flags Great Adventure in New Jersey
