= 2024 in amusement parks =

This is a list of events, openings, and closings that occurred in amusement parks in 2024. These various lists are not exhaustive.

== Amusement parks ==
=== Opening ===
- Mexico Aztlán Parque Urbano
- Poland Hossoland (2025)
- United Arab Emirates Loco Bear

=== Change of ownership ===
- Australia Luna Park Sydney - Brookfield Corporation » Oscars Group

=== Birthdays ===
- U.S. Six Flags Great Adventure - 50th anniversary
- U.S. Six Flags Great Escape and Hurricane Harbor - 70th anniversary
- U.S. Stricker's Grove - 100th anniversary

=== Closed ===
- U.S. Gillian's Wonderland Pier – Fall 2024

== Additions ==
=== Roller coasters ===
==== New ====
Name	Park	Type	Manufacturer	Opened	Ref(s)
Alghazal	Meryal	Spinning roller coaster	Intamin	June 18	
Alpenexpress Enzian	Europa-Park	Powered roller coaster	Mack Rides	April 26	
Alpine Coaster	Thredbo Alpine Resort	Alpine coaster	Wiegand	2024	
Antares	Conny-Land	Roller Ball	Ride Engineers Switzerland	2024	
Antimatter Move / 反物质行动	Senbo Interstellar Place	Shuttle roller coaster	Beijing Shibaolai Amusement Equipment	2024	
Attack of the Aswang	Pradera Islands Park	Steel roller coaster	Preston & Barbieri	2024	
Berg- und Tal Hetz	Skyline Park	Launched roller coaster	SBF Visa	2024	
Big Air Coaster	Animalia	Spinning roller coaster	SBF Visa	2024	
Bobcat	Six Flags Great Escape	Wooden roller coaster	The Gravity Group	2024	
Bockwurstschleuder	Karls Erlebnis-Dorf Döbeln	Shuttle roller coaster	Sunkid	2024	
Bolt	Skytropolis Indoor Theme Park	Powered roller coaster	Beijing Shibaolai Amusement Equipment	2024	
Brazilian Buggies	Bellewaerde Park	Family roller coaster	Zamperla	2024	
Caldwell's Krazy Coaster	Lake George Expedition Park	Spinning roller coaster	SBF Visa	2024	
Caterpillar	Funland	Powered roller coaster	Unknown	2024	
Chenille	Loos Parc	Kiddie roller coaster	Kılıç Lunapark	2024	
CHI Dragon Chases The Sun	Long Rainbow Park	Family roller coaster	Unknown	2024	
Choco Chip Creek	Energylandia	Mine train roller coaster	Vekoma	2024	
Cinder Roller Coaster	Storybook Land	Spinning roller coaster	SBF Visa	2024	
Coaster Adventures	Happy Valley Shenzhen	Spinning roller coaster	Jinma Rides	2024	
Crazy Mouse	Beijing Shijingshan Amusement Park	Wild mouse	Unknown	2024	
Cyclon	Park of Culture and Rest	Galaxi	Unknown	2024	
Daddy Pig's Roller Coaster	Peppa Pig Theme Park	Kiddie roller coaster	Zamperla	2024	
Dino Rong	Kadrioru Karussell	Kiddie roller coaster	Unknown	2024	
Drachenblitz	ErlebnisBocksBerg	Alpine coaster	Wiegand	2024	
Dragon	Playcenter Family	Powered roller coaster	Zamperla	2024	
Dragon Coaster	Kiddie Park	Kiddie roller coaster	Wisdom Rides	2024	
Erdbeer Raupenbahn	Karls Erlebnis-Dorf Döbeln	Kiddie roller coaster	SBF Visa	2024	
Family Launch Coaster	Churpfalzpark	Launched roller coaster	SBF Visa	2024	
Fast Speed	Beijing Shijingshan Amusement Park	Steel roller coaster	Hebei Tianhong Amusement Equipment Company	2024	
Fianna Force	Emerald Park	Suspended roller coaster	Vekoma	2024	
Fighter Jet	Fantawild Oriental Dawn	Launched roller coaster	Vekoma	2024	
Fire in the Hole	Silver Dollar City	Steel roller coaster	Rocky Mountain Construction	2024	
Fjord Explorer	Le Pal	Water coaster	Mack Rides	2024	
Flight of the Wicked Witch	Warner Bros. Movie World	Suspended roller coaster	Vekoma	2024	
Flying Dragon	Discovery Land	Spinning roller coaster	Beijing Shibaoli Amusement Equipment	2024	
Frontline Charge	Fantawild Oriental Dawn	Steel roller coaster	Vekoma	2024	
Gobbi Express	Taunus Wunderland	Powered roller coaster	Mack Rides	2024	
Goldmine Achterbahn	Belli's Mini-Freizeitpark	Kiddie roller coaster		2024	
Gold Rush	Drayton Manor	Launched roller coaster	Intamin	2024	
Good Gravy!	Holiday World	Family Boomerang	Vekoma	2024	
Grand Prix de Fééryland	Fééryland	Spinning roller coaster	SBF Visa	2024	
Hala Madrid	Real Madrid World	Wooden roller coaster	Great Coasters International	2024	
Hanging Roller Coaster / 悬挂过山车	Dinosaur Dreamworks	Inverted roller coaster	Unknown	2024	
Happy Bee	Daynabrook Greenhouse	Powered roller coaster	Unknown	2024	
Happy Caterpillar	Blair Drummond Safari and Adventure Park	Kiddie roller coaster	Unknown	2024	
Honey Harbor	Energylandia	Kiddie roller coaster	Vekoma	2024	
Hyperia	Thorpe Park	Hypercoaster	Mack Rides	May 24	
Inverse Time and Space Roller Coaster / 反转时空过山车	Silk Road Paradise	Fourth-dimension roller coaster	Intamin	2024	
Iron Menace	Dorney Park & Wildwater Kingdom	Dive Coaster	Bolliger & Mabillard	May 10	
Izio Express	Jardin des Bêtes	Family roller coaster	Zierer	2024	
Jack-O-Coaster	Wonderla Amusement Park Bhubaneswar	Kiddie roller coaster	Unknown	2024	
Jeepo Dino	La Récré des 3 Curés	Wild Mouse	Zamperla	2024	
Jungle Roller Coaster / 丛林过山车 / Cónglín Guòshānchē	Pengzu Garden	Family roller coaster	Chang Long / 昌龙	2024	
Jungle Rush	Dreamworld	Switchback roller coaster	Vekoma	2024	
Kangaroo Racer	Naturwildpark Freisen	Steel roller coaster	N/A	2024	
Kansas Twister	Warner Bros. Movie World	Steel roller coaster	Vekoma	2024	
Penguin Trek	SeaWorld Orlando	Family launched roller coaster	Bolliger & Mabillard	2024	
Phoenix Rising	Busch Gardens Tampa Bay	Family inverted roller coaster	Bolliger & Mabillard	2024	
The Quest	Emerald Park	Family Boomerang	Vekoma	May 22	
Snoopy's Soap Box Racers	Kings Island	Family Boomerang	Vekoma	May 24	
Snoopy’s Tenderpaw Twister Coaster	Knott's Berry Farm	Family roller coaster	Zamperla	June 27	
Vindfald	Tivoli Friheden	Euro-Fighter	Gerstlauer	May 18	
Voltron Nevera	Europa-Park	Launched roller coaster	Mack Rides	April 26	
Wiener Looping	Wurstelprater	Steel roller coaster	Mack Rides	September 2024	

==== Relocated ====
Name	Park	Type	Manufacturer	Opened	Formerly	Ref(s)
All American Triple Loop	Indiana Beach	Looping coaster	Anton Schwarzkopf	May 11	Quimera at La Feria de Chapultepec	
Black Widow	Cedar Valley's Wild Frontier Fun Park	Kiddie roller coaster	Allan Herschell Company	2024	Roller Coaster at Funland Amusement Park	
Cyclone	Animalia	Galaxi	SBF Visa	December 2024	Montanha Russa at Parc Magique	
The Flash: Speed Force	Warner Bros. Movie World	Shuttle roller coaster	Intamin	May 17th	Surfrider at Wet'n'Wild Gold Coast	
Rocket Roller Coaster	Lightwater Valley	Galaxi	Interpark	May 2024	Airbender at Camel Creek Adventure Park	
Serpent	Niagara Amusement Park & Splash World	Galaxi	S.D.C.	August 27	Serpent at Fun Way Amusement Park	

==== Refurbished ====
Name	Park	Type	Manufacturer	Opened	Formerly	Ref(s)
Nemesis Reborn	Alton Towers	Inverted roller coaster	Bolliger & Mabillard	March 16	Nemesis	
Thunder Striker	Carowinds	Hypercoaster	Bolliger & Mabillard	2024	Intimidator	
Top Thrill 2	Cedar Point	Launched roller coaster	Zamperla	May 4	Top Thrill Dragster	

=== Other new attractions ===
==== New ====
Name	Park	Type	Opened	Ref(s)
Animation Academy	Epcot	Animation class	2024	
Danse Macabre	Efteling	Dynamic Motion Stage	October 31	
Fantasy Springs	Tokyo DisneySea	Themed area	June 6	
Fly with Appa	Nickelodeon Universe	Aerial carousel	March 23	
Frozen Ever After	Tokyo DisneySea	Reversing Shoot the Chute/Dark ride	June 6	
Laser Dance	Wurstelprater, Prater	HUSS Breakdance 5	November 2024	
Mega Mayhem	Rapids Water Park	Water coaster	April 4	
Sky Striker	Six Flags Great America	Zamperla Giga Discovery	June 22	
Splash Lagoon	Paultons Park	ABC Rides Log flume	May 2024	
SpongeBob's Crazy Carnival Ride	Circus Circus Las Vegas	Interactive dark ride	March 1	
The Celtic Dreamer	Emerald Park	Zierer Wave Swinger	May 22	
The Rise of Icarus	Mt. Olympus Water & Theme Park	Water slide complex	May 25	
Tír na nÓg	Emerald Park	Themed area	May 22	

==== Refurbished ====
Name	Park	Type	Opened	Formerly	Ref(s)
Cadbury Chocolate Quest	Cadbury World	Trackless dark ride	March 29	Cadabra	
Dino Valley	Legoland California	Themed area	March 22	Explorer Island	
Tiana's Bayou Adventure	Magic Kingdom; Disneyland	Log flume	June 28	Splash Mountain	

== Closed attractions & roller coasters ==
Name	Park	Type	Closed	Ref(s)
Anaconda	Kings Dominion	Looping roller coaster	2024	
The Amazing Adventures of Spider-Man	Universal Studios Japan	Motion-based 3D dark ride	January 22	
Buzz Lightyear's Space Ranger Spin	Tokyo Disneyland	Shooting dark ride	October 31	
Drop Tower	Carowinds	Intamin Drop Tower	2024	
Green Lantern	Six Flags Great Adventure	Stand-up roller coaster	November 10	
It's a Small World	Tokyo Disneyland	Old Mill	Fall 2024	
Kingda Ka	Six Flags Great Adventure	Steel launched roller coaster	November 10	
La Vibora	Six Flags Over Texas	Bobsled roller coaster	2024	
Nighthawk	Carowinds	Flying roller coaster	2024	
Rocket Rollercoaster	Lightwater Valley	Galaxi	September	
Scorpion	Busch Gardens Tampa Bay	Roller coaster	September 2	
Snake River Falls	Cedar Point	Shoot the chute water ride	September 2	
Space Mountain	Tokyo Disneyland	Enclosed roller coaster	July 31	
Spider	Waldameer & Water World	Spider ride	September 2	
Sky Flower	Tokyo Dome City Attractions	Intamin Parachute Tower	January 31	
Parachute Training Center: Edward's AFB Jump Tower	Six Flags Great Adventure	Intamin Parachute Tower	December 19 (Demolition)	
