= Goliath (Six Flags Over Georgia) =

Steel roller coaster in Georgia, US

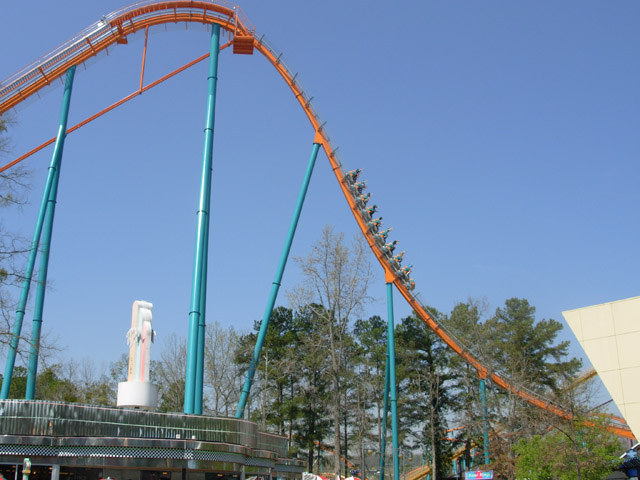
- Goliath's 170-foot (52 m) first drop

Six Flags Over Georgia
- Location: Six Flags Over Georgia
- Park section: USA Section
- Coordinates: 33°46′09″N 84°33′00″W
- Status: Closed
- Opening date: April 1, 2006
- Cost: $20,000,000
- Replaced: Great Gasp; Looping Starship

General statistics
- Type: Steel
- Manufacturer: Bolliger & Mabillard
- Model: Hyper Coaster
- Track layout: Out and Back
- Lift/launch system: Chain lift hill
- Height: 200 ft (61 m)
- Drop: 175 ft (53 m)
- Length: 4,480 ft (1,370 m)
- Speed: 70 mph (110 km/h)
- Inversions: 0
- Duration: 3:30
- Max vertical angle: 59°
- Capacity: 1220 riders per hour
- Height restriction: 54 in (137 cm)
- Trains: 2 trains with 9 cars; riders arranged 4 across in a single row for a total of 36 riders per train
- Fast Lane available
- Goliath at RCDB

Goliath is a steel roller coaster located at Six Flags Over Georgia in Mableton, Georgia, United States. Manufactured by Bolliger & Mabillard, the Hyper Coaster model climbs to a height of 200 feet (61 m) and reaches a maximum speed of 70 mph (110 km/h). It opened to the public on April 1, 2006, replacing the Great Gasp and Looping Starship attractions.

Goliath ranked as the fourth-best new ride and ninth-best steel roller coaster in the 2006 Golden Ticket Awards from Amusement Today. Its highest ranking among steel coasters was fourth, achieved in 2009 and 2011. The ride temporarily closed following an October 2026 incident that killed one rider and injured four others.

== History ==
Six Flags announced Goliath in September 2005 as a steel hypercoaster manufactured by Bolliger & Mabillard, expected to cost $20 million (equivalent to $32.97 million in 2025). The Great Gasp and Looping Starship attractions were closed and removed by the end of the 2005 season to make room for the new coaster.

Work on the support foundations began in September 2005. Track arrived in early October, and installation of the supports and track began shortly afterward. The lift hill was completed later that year, and the trains arrived in March 2006. Following the completion of construction and testing, Goliath opened to the public on April 1, 2006.

== Ride experience ==
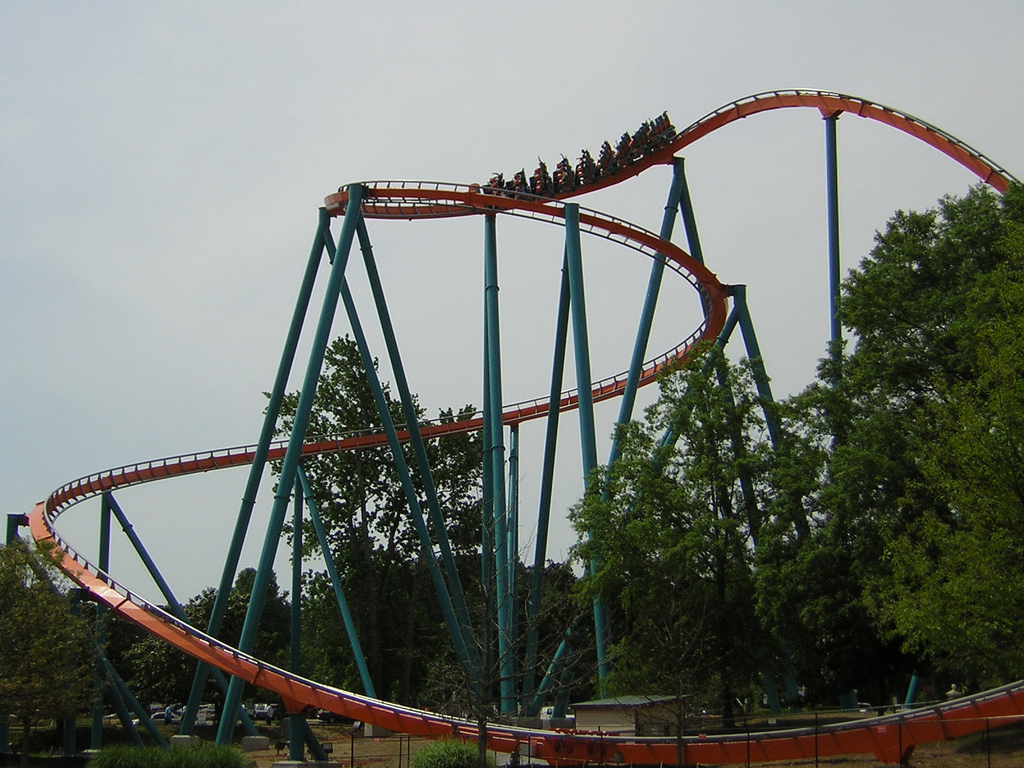
Goliath's 540-degree helix

After leaving the station, the train turns left toward the 200-foot (61 m) chain lift hill. From the top, it drops 170 feet (52 m), reaching a maximum speed of 70 mph (110 km/h). It then climbs the first camelback hill before descending the ride's tallest drop of 175 feet (53 m). A banked left turn leads to a second camelback hill with a 129-foot (39 m) drop. The train then climbs into a 540-degree descending helix, passes through a set of trim brakes, and traverses a third camelback hill with a 118-foot (36 m) drop.

The train then enters a horseshoe turn, followed by three progressively smaller camelback hills with drops of 79 feet (24 m), 56 feet (17 m), and 48 feet (15 m). Following a banked left turn, the train makes a short drop before entering the final brake run and returning to the station. One ride cycle lasts approximately three and a half minutes.

== Characteristics ==
=== Track ===
The steel track of Goliath is approximately 4,480 feet (1,370 m) long and covers an area of about 8.5 acres (3.4 ha; 0.0133 sq mi). The height of the lift is 200 feet (61 m). The roller coaster has no inversions, though it does feature six camelback hills and a 540-degree helix. The track was painted orange while the supports were painted teal upon opening. The track was repainted turquoise with the supports painted grey before the 2025 season. Goliath was manufactured by Clermont Steel Fabricators located in Batavia, Ohio.

=== Trains ===
Goliath operates with two steel and fiberglass trains. Each train has nine cars which can seat four riders in a single row, for a total of 36 riders per train; each seat has its own individual lap-bar restraint. This configuration allows the ride to achieve a theoretical capacity of 1,220 riders per hour. The structure of the trains is painted orange and teal, with matching colored restraints and seats.

== Reception ==
Joel Bullock from The Coaster Critic and Mike from NewsPlusNotes both praised the g-forces experienced while going through the helix, as well as the amount of airtime Goliath has. Bullock described Goliath as "not only the park’s best roller coaster, but arguably the best coaster in the South East (south of Virginia)." Mike Collins from CoasterRadio.com particularly enjoyed the section of the roller coaster that takes riders outside of the park boundaries. He also said that, "[Goliath is] a fun and fast coaster. It’s all about the airtime... and you get a lot of it."

In Goliath's opening year, it was voted the fourth best new ride for 2006 and the ninth best steel roller coaster in Amusement Today's Golden Ticket Awards. The roller coaster peaked at position four in 2009 and 2011.

Golden Ticket Awards: Best New Ride for 2006
Ranking	4

Golden Ticket Awards: Top steel Roller Coasters
Year									1998	1999
Ranking									–	–
Year	2000	2001	2002	2003	2004	2005	2006	2007	2008	2009
Ranking	–	–	–	–	–	–	9	8	6	4
Year	2010	2011	2012	2013	2014	2015	2016	2017	2018	2019
Ranking	5	4	9	7	9	12	20	14 (tie)	26	30 (tie)
Year	2020	2021	2022	2023	2024	2025	2026			
Ranking	N/A	28 (tie)	41	45	46	–	–			

== Incidents ==
On July 27, 2006, a 45-year-old man was found unresponsive and not breathing on Goliath after losing consciousness during the ride. Park employees began to treat the man before he was taken to a local hospital and pronounced dead. After an inspection showed that the roller coaster was operating properly, it was reopened to the public.

On October 12, 2026, a 42-year-old man was killed after being ejected from his seat on Goliath. Four other riders were injured, and the ride was evacuated. Six Flags temporarily closed Goliath, as well as nine similar roller coasters at six other parks as a precaution. La Ronde also closed its Goliath roller coaster for a safety review. The coaster's manufacturer, Bolliger & Mabillard, and the Georgia Office of the Commissioner of Insurance and Safety Fire launched investigations into the incident.
