= Parachute Jump =

Defunct amusement ride in Brooklyn, New York

- U.S. National Register of Historic Places
- New York State Register of Historic Places
- New York City Landmark
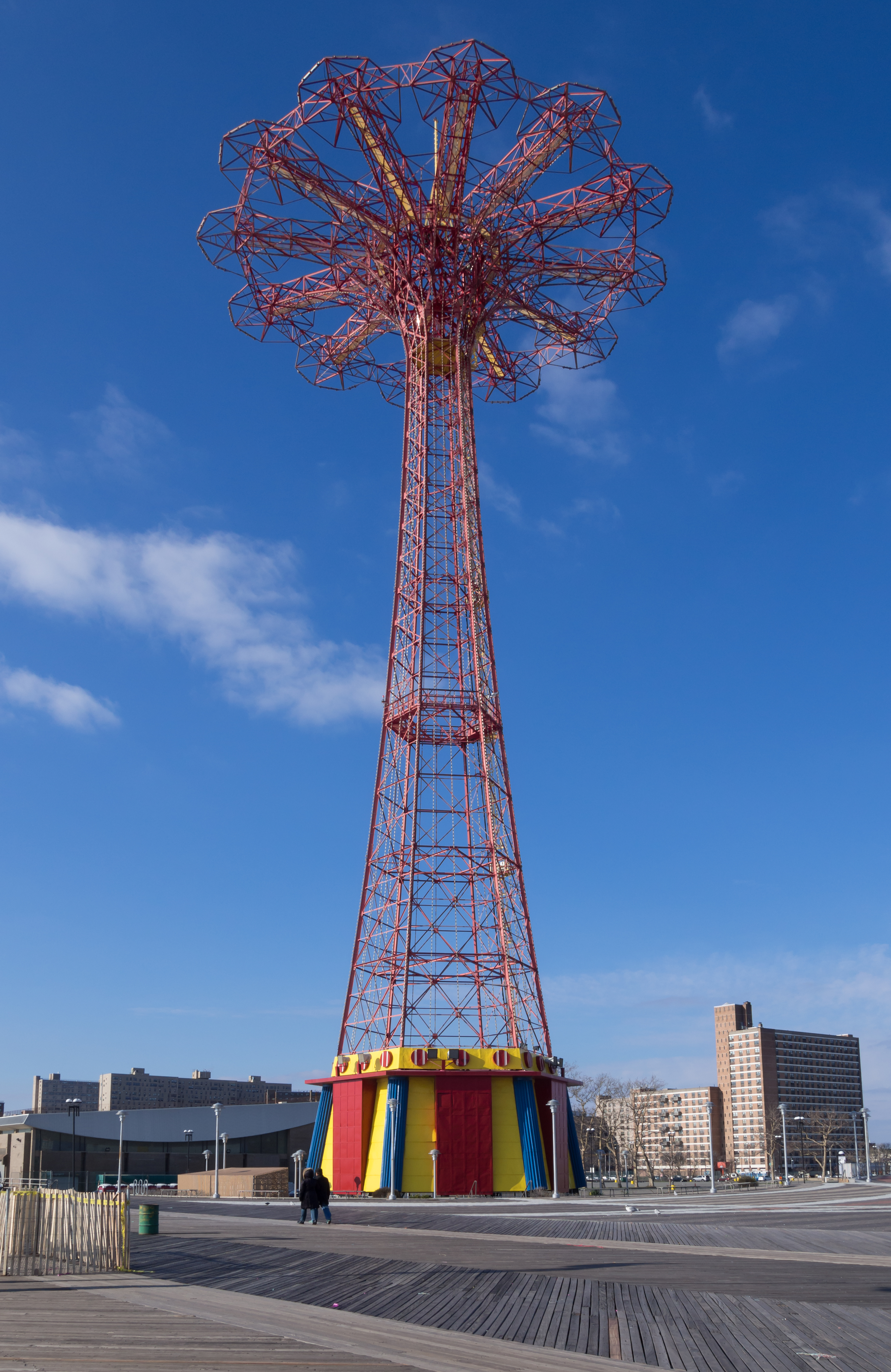
- Seen from the Riegelmann Boardwalk
- Location: Coney Island, Brooklyn, New York City
- Coordinates: 40°34′23″N 73°59′04″W
- Built: 1939
- Architects: Michael Marlo; Edwin W. Kleinert
- NRHP reference No.: 80002645
- NYSRHP No.: 04701.000146
- NYCL No.: 1638

Significant dates
- Added to NRHP: September 2, 1980
- Designated NYSRHP: October 23, 1981
- Designated NYCL: May 23, 1989

The Parachute Jump is a defunct amusement ride and a landmark in the New York City borough of Brooklyn, along the Riegelmann Boardwalk at Coney Island. Situated in Steeplechase Plaza near the B&B Carousell, the structure consists of a 250-foot-tall (76 m), 170-short-ton (150 t) open-frame, steel parachute tower. Twelve cantilever steel arms radiate from the top of the tower; when the ride was in operation, each arm supported a parachute attached to a lift rope and a set of guide cables. Riders were belted into a two-person canvas seat, lifted to the top, and dropped. The parachute and shock absorbers at the bottom would slow their descent.

International Parachuting Inc. was selected in May 1938 to operate the Parachute Jump at the 1939 New York World's Fair at Flushing Meadows–Corona Park in New York City. Capped by a 12-foot (3.7 m) flagpole, it was the second-tallest structure at the fair. The ride was sponsored by Life Savers during the fair's first season, and it was relocated during the fair's second season to attract more visitors. In 1941, after the World's Fair, it was moved again to the Steeplechase amusement park on Coney Island. It ceased operations in the 1960s following the park's closure, and the frame fell into disrepair.

Despite proposals to either demolish or restore the ride, disputes over its use caused it to remain unused through the 1980s. The Parachute Jump has been renovated several times since the 1990s, both for stability and for aesthetic reasons. In the 2000s, it was restored and fitted with a lighting system. The lights were activated in 2006 and replaced in a subsequent project in 2013. It has been lit up in commemoration of events such as the death of Kobe Bryant. The ride, the only remaining portion of Steeplechase Park, is a New York City designated landmark and has been listed on the National Register of Historic Places.

== Description ==
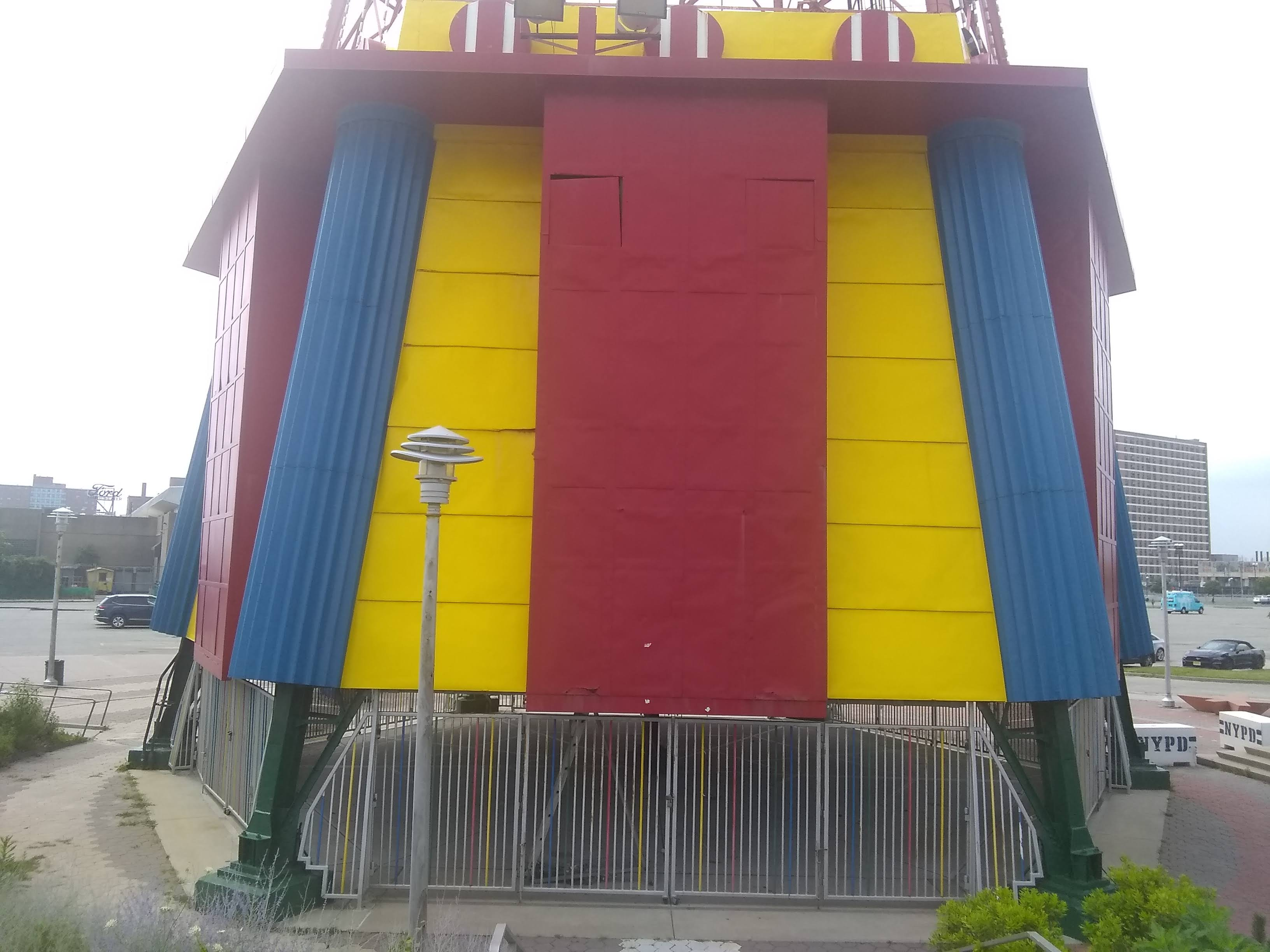
View of the pavilion from near the B&B Carousell, looking west

The Parachute Jump is on the Riegelmann Boardwalk at Coney Island between West 16th and West 19th Streets. It consists of a hexagonal base, upon which stands a six-sided steel structure. Each of the tower's legs consists of a 12-inch-wide (30 cm) flange column braced with horizontal ribs at 7-foot (2.1 m) intervals and diagonal ribs between the horizontal beams. The legs are grounded on concrete foundations, each of which contains twelve timber piles. The diagonal and horizontal ribs intersect at gusset plates, which contain splices at 30-foot (9.1 m) intervals and are riveted to the base. A ladder is on the north side of the structure, extending from the top of the base. There are anti-climbing devices on the frame. The frame has about 8,000 lighting fixtures, which are used for night-time light shows. The tower's wide base gives it stability, while the top is tapered off.

The Parachute Jump is 250 feet (76 m) tall. (Note: Some sources give a different figure of 271 feet (83 m) or 277 feet (84 m).) When the ride operated at the 1939 New York World's Fair, it was 262 feet (80 m) tall, since it was topped by a 12-foot (3.7 m) flagpole. Twelve drop points are at the top, marked by structural steel arms, which extend outward 45 feet (14 m) from the tower's center, and support octagonal subframes at the far end of each arm. Eight parachute guidelines were suspended from each subframe, which helped keep the parachute open. A circular structure runs atop the subframes, connecting them to each other. Walkways were above the top of the tower, as well as along each arm.

Functional parachutes dangled from each of the twelve sub-frames and were held open by metal rings. As originally designed, each parachute was 32 feet (9.8 m) in diameter. Each parachute required three cable operators. Riders were belted into two-person canvas seats hanging below the closed parachutes. The parachutes would open as the riders were hoisted to the top of the ride, where release mechanisms would drop them. The parachutes could be stopped at any time during the ascent, but not during the descent. The parachutes slowed the rider's descent, and the seats would be stopped by a brake after they had fallen to 4 feet (1.2 m) above ground level. Shock absorbers at the bottom, consisting of pole-mounted springs, cushioned the landing. The parachutes could accommodate loads of up to 600 pounds (270 kg).

The base consists of a two-story pavilion. The upper floor housed mechanical structures and hoisting machinery, while the ground floor contained ticket booths and a waiting room. The pavilion has six sides divided by fluted piers which slope upward toward the corrugated galvanized-iron roof. The upper floor of the pavilion has red, yellow, and blue walls. The lower floor, below the height of the boardwalk, contained fenced-off open space. The 4-inch-thick (10 cm) concrete platform surrounding the pavilion is several steps beneath the boardwalk level. It was originally intended as a landing pad for riders and has a radius of 68 feet (21 m). An access ramp was at the northeast corner of the platform.

== Precursors ==
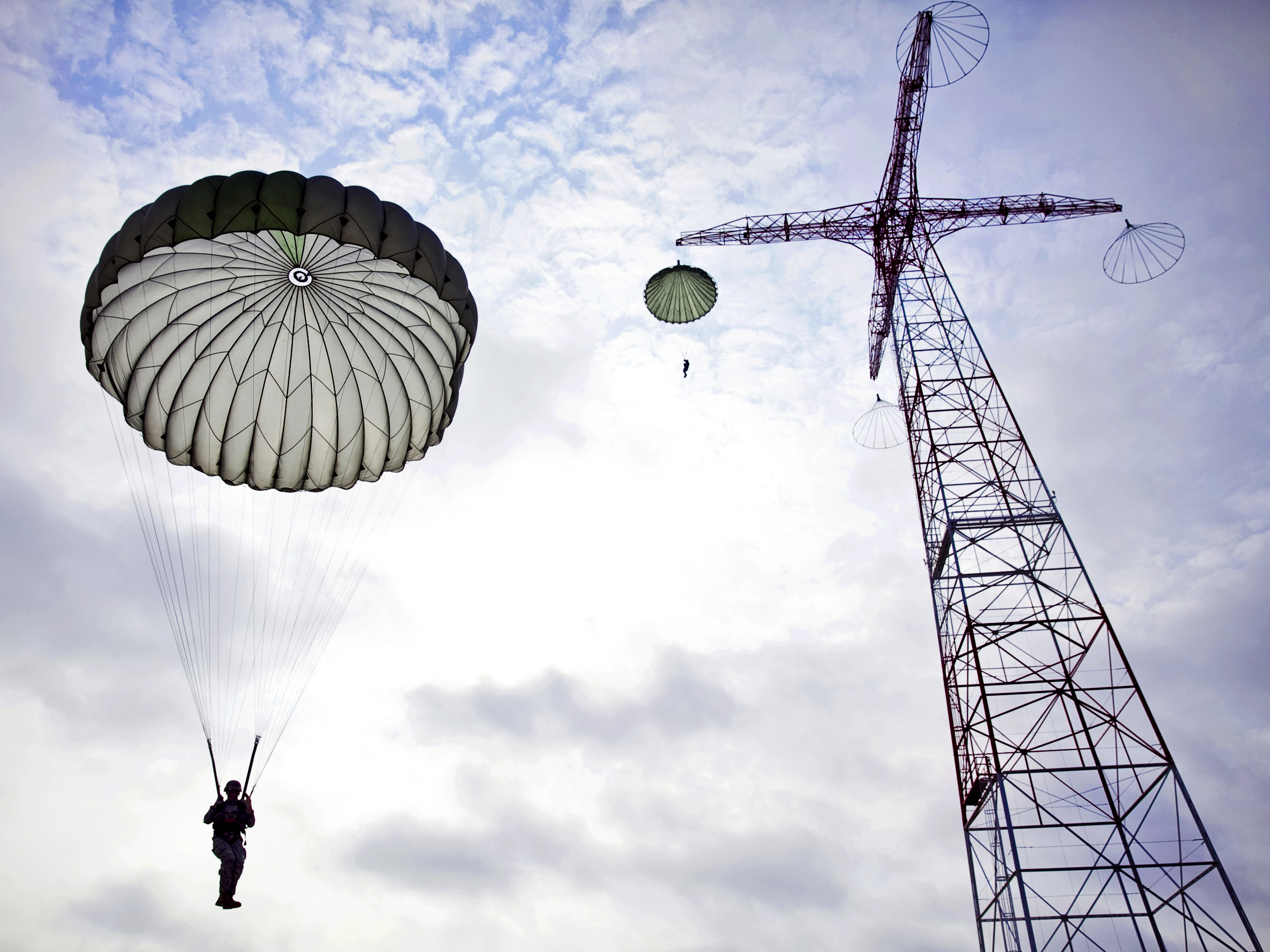
A parachute tower at the United States Army Airborne School, 2013

By the 1930s, parachutists could be trained by jumping from parachute towers rather than from aircraft. Accordingly, Stanley Switlik and George P. Putnam built a 115-foot-tall (35 m) tower on Switlik's farm in Ocean County, New Jersey. The tower, which was designed to train airmen in parachute jumping, was first publicly used on June 2, 1935, when Amelia Earhart jumped from it.

The "parachute device" was patented by retired U.S. Naval Commander James H. Strong along with Switlik, inspired by early practice towers Strong had seen in the Soviet Union, where simple wooden towers had been used to train paratroopers since the 1920s. Strong designed a safer version of the tower, which included eight guide wires in a circle surrounding the parachute. Strong filed a patent in 1935 and built several test platforms at his home in Hightstown, New Jersey, in 1936 and 1937. The military platforms suspended a single rider in a harness and offered a few seconds of free fall after the release at the top before the chutes opened to slow the fall. In response to high civilian interest in trying out the ride, Strong modified his invention for non-military use, making some design changes. These included a seat that could hold two people, a larger parachute for a slower drop, a metal ring to hold it open, and shock-absorbing springs to ease the final landing. The modified amusement-ride version was marketed by Miranda Brothers Inc. as a 150-foot-tall (46 m), two-armed parachute jump.

Strong sold military versions of the tower to the Romanian and U.S. armies, and he installed towers in New Jersey and Fort Benning, Georgia. He converted an existing observation tower in Chicago's Riverview Park into a six-chute amusement ride. This enterprise, the "Pair-O-Chutes", performed well enough that Strong applied to build and operate a jump at the 1939 New York World's Fair. Another jump, also reportedly designed by Strong, was installed at the Exposition Internationale des Arts et Techniques dans la Vie Moderne in Paris in 1937.

== Operation ==
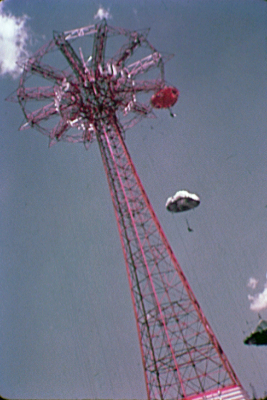
The ride operating at the 1939 World's Fair

=== 1939 World's Fair ===
==== Development ====
Grover Whalen, the president of the New York World's Fair Corporation (WFC), selected International Parachuting Inc. in May 1938 to operate a parachute drop at the World's Fair. This was the first concession to be awarded for an amusement ride at the fair. The ride, known as the Parachute Jump, was to be in the fair's amusement zone, along the eastern shore of Meadow Lake in Flushing Meadows–Corona Park, Queens. Originally, the ride was placed near the southern end of the fairground's amusement area. L. C. Holden and R. D. Stott were hired to design the ride, and the firm of Skinner, Cook & Babcock was awarded the contract for the ride's erection in November 1938. Construction of the Parachute Jump began the following month on December 11, 1938.

Elwyn E. Seelye & Co. designed the steelwork, Bethlehem Steel manufactured the tower pieces, and Skinner, Cook & Babcock assembled the pieces onsite. The construction cost about $99,000 (equivalent to $2,291,000 in 2025). Life Savers sponsored the ride, investing $15,000 (equivalent to $347,000 in 2025) and decorated its tower with brightly lit, candy-shaped rings. Although the fair opened April 28, 1939, the Parachute Jump's aerial elevators had not been completed at that time. By late May 1939, just before the ride opened, Life Savers had begun installing billboards at the ride's base.

==== 1939 season ====
The Life Savers Parachute Jump opened on May 27, 1939. It had twelve parachute bays; while five parachutes were operational upon opening, eleven would eventually be used at the fair. Within three days of the ride's opening, a 12-foot (3.7 m) flagpole was added atop the original 250-foot-tall (76 m) tower to surpass the height of a statue within the Soviet Pavilion. The flagpole had been installed because members of the public had objected to the Soviet statue being placed higher than the United States' flag. It was the second-tallest structure in the fair, aside from the Perisphere, which stood 700 feet (210 m) tall. Each ride cost $0.40 (equivalent to $9.26 in 2025) for adults and $0.25 (equivalent to $5.79 in 2025) for children. The trip to the top took about a minute, and the drop took between 10 and 20 seconds. The official 1939 Fair guidebook described the Parachute Jump as "one of the most spectacular features of the Amusement Area", calling the attraction "similar to that which the armies of the world use in early stages of training for actual parachute jumping".

The ride accommodated 4,500 passengers on its first two half-days of operation. Several incidents occurred within the first few months of the Parachute Jump's opening. On July 12, 1939, entangled cables left a married couple aloft for five hours in the middle of the night. The couple returned to ride again the next day, having been congratulated for their courage by New York City mayor Fiorello H. La Guardia, who had been at the World's Fair when they got stuck. At least two other groups of people became stuck on the Parachute Jump in its first year: a deputy sheriff and his sister-in-law later in July 1939, and two female friends that September. Despite a decrease in fairground visitors during mid-1939, the Parachute Jump was one of the few attractions at the fair to remain profitable. The jump earned $119,524 in its first three months of operation (equivalent to $2,747,000 in 2025). At the end of the first season on November 1, 1939, the jump had recorded 551,960 visitors.

==== 1940 season ====
The Parachute Jump's popularity was negatively affected by its secluded location. After the Life Savers sponsorship ended at the conclusion of the 1939 season, the WFC decided to relocate the ride to attract more visitors. The relocation was announced in December 1939, and work began in February 1940. The new location was near the New York City Subway's World's Fair station, occupying part of the Children's World site at the northeast corner of the amusement area. A twelfth chute was installed, and the chutes, hoist cables, and guide wires were all replaced. The WFC also considered installing lights atop the Parachute Jump to increase its visibility. By the beginning of April 1940, workers were installing dozens of 60-foot-deep (18 m) pilings to support the Parachute Jump. The project cost $88,500 (equivalent to $2,034,000 in 2025). The American Jubilee theater was built on the Parachute Jump's old site.

The ride was originally supposed to be completed by May 8, 1940. The chutes were installed on May 1, and the guide wires were still being installed when the fair reopened on May 11. The reopening was delayed by disagreements between International Parachuting Inc. and James Strong. International Parachuting sued Strong to prevent him from selling the rights to the ride to third parties, though they ultimately reached a settlement that June. The Parachute Jump reopened on June 22, 1940, over a month after the fair's reopening. The ride initially retained its original ticket prices of 40 cents for adults and 25 cents for children. In July 1940, in response to the implementation of a federal amusement tax, the ride's operators reduced the ticket prices to $0.36 (equivalent to $8.27 in 2025) for adults and $0.20 (equivalent to $4.6 in 2025) for children. During the fair's second season, a couple was married on the Parachute Jump in what one newspaper described as the first-ever "parachute ceremony".

The relocation of the Parachute Jump, and the consolidation of concessions in the amusement area, helped improve business for the 1940 season. The Parachute Jump ultimately was the fair's second-most popular amusement attraction, behind the Billy Rose's Aquacade stage show. A half-million guests had jumped from the tower before the end of the World's Fair. The Parachute Jump was slated to be sent to either Coney Island in Brooklyn or Palisades Amusement Park in New Jersey following the fair. Relocation to Coney Island was considered as early as August 1940; both Luna Park and Steeplechase Park were interested in purchasing the ride during this time. After the fair closed in October 1940, its operators announced that the Parachute Jump would be sent to Coney Island. The New York Times wrote that the Parachute Jump "outdid all rivals in old-fashioned thrills", especially when the parachutes got stuck.

=== Steeplechase Park ===
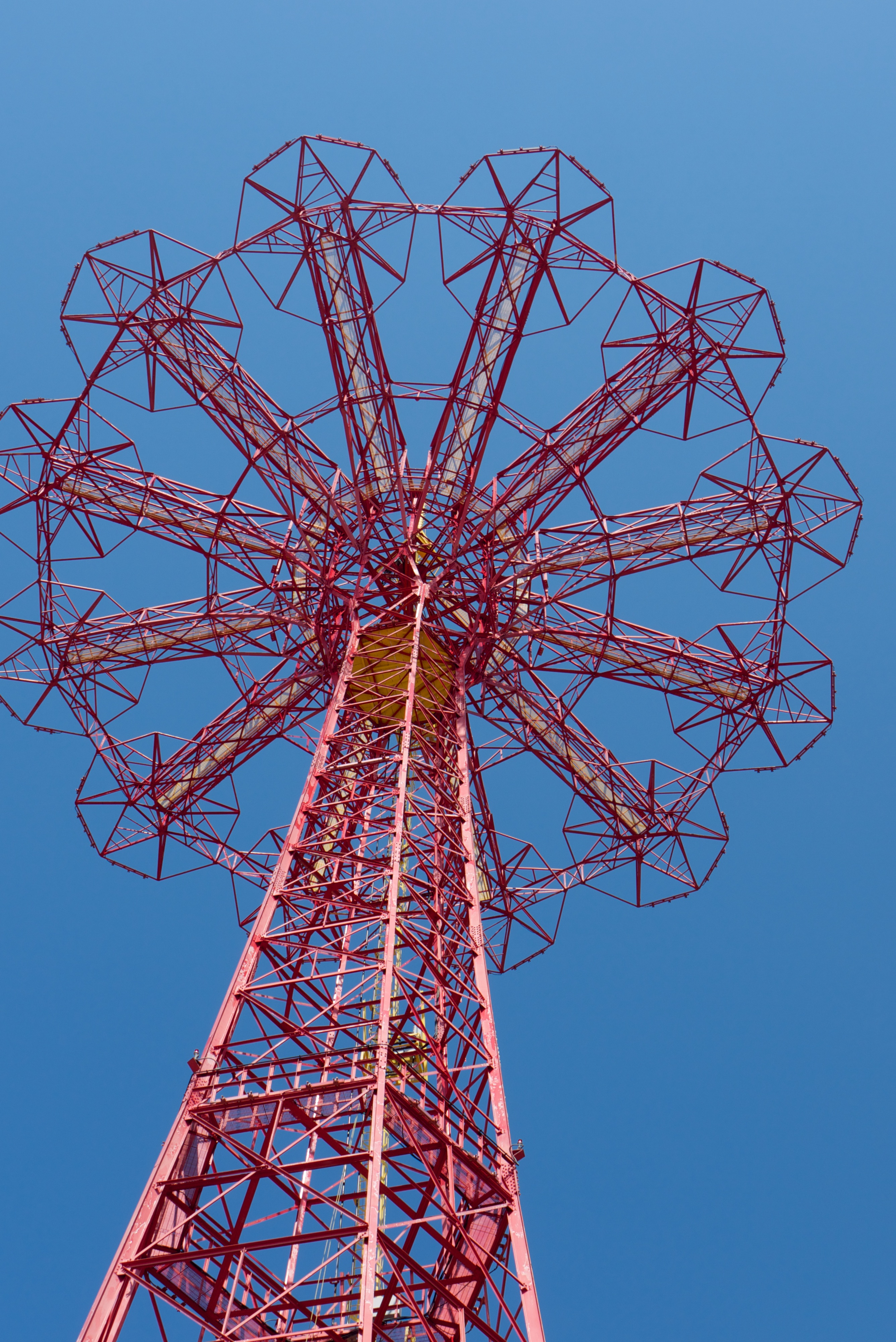
The Parachute Jump, as seen from directly below

Frank Tilyou and George Tilyou Jr., the owners of Steeplechase Park, acquired the jump for $150,000 (equivalent to $3,283,371 in 2025). The park was recovering from a September 1939 fire, which had caused $200,000 (equivalent to $4,629,187 in 2025) in damage and injured 18 people. The fire had destroyed many of the larger attractions, including a Flying Turns roller coaster, whose site stood empty a year after the blaze. The Parachute Jump was disassembled in January 1941 and moved to the site of the Flying Turns coaster, adjacent to the boardwalk. The ride required some modifications in its new, windier, shore-side location, including the addition of 30-foot-deep (9.1 m) foundations. The relocation was supervised by the engineer Edwin W. Kleinert and architect Michael Marlo. Its installation was part of a larger reconstruction of an 800-foot-long (240 m) section of the boardwalk. A reporter for Billboard magazine wrote that the Parachute Jump was visible "from Staten Island, from far at sea, and from the Battery".

The jump reopened in May 1941. Unlimited rides on the Parachute Jump were initially included within Steeplechase Park's single admission fee, which cost $0.25 (equivalent to $5.47 in 2025) at the time of the ride's relocation. Later, the brothers introduced "combination tickets", which included the park admission fee and a predetermined number of ride experiences on any of the attractions in the park. During World War II, when much of the city was subject to a military blackout, a navigational beacon atop the ride stayed lit. The Parachute Jump originally used the multicolored chutes from the World's Fair; by the mid-1940s, these had been replaced with white chutes. According to Jim McCollough, a business partner and nephew of the Tilyou brothers, the frame was repainted every year.

The Parachute Jump attracted up to half a million riders during each annual operating season. Most riders reached the tower's pinnacle in just under a minute and descended within 11–15 seconds. The experience was described as similar to "flying in a free fall". The Parachute Jump was popular among off-duty military personnel, who took their friends and loved ones to the ride. Occasionally, riders became stuck mid-jump or were tangled within the cables. (Note: See, for instance: "Stuck in Parachute Jump". The New York Times. July 13, 1941. ISSN 0362-4331. Archived from the original on July 18, 2019.; "2 Girls in High Suspense As Parachute Jump Sticks". The New York Times. September 2, 1946. ISSN 0362-4331. Archived from the original on July 18, 2019.; "2 Dangle 90 Minutes on Coney Island Jump". The New York Times. May 31, 1958. ISSN 0362-4331. Archived from the original on July 18, 2019.) The ride was subject to shutdowns on windy days, especially when breezes exceeded 45 miles per hour (72 km/h). Furthermore, at least fifteen people were required to operate the Parachute Jump, making it unprofitable.

By 1964, the ride was charging $0.75 (equivalent to $7.79 in 2025) on weekends but was still operating mostly the same way as it had during the 1939 World's Fair. Coney Island's popularity had receded during the 1960s because of increased crime, insufficient parking facilities, and patterns of bad weather. These difficulties were exacerbated by competition from the 1964 New York World's Fair, also in Flushing Meadows–Corona Park, which led to a record low patronage at Steeplechase Park. On September 20, 1964, Steeplechase Park closed for the last time, and the next year, the property was sold to developer Fred Trump. On the site of Steeplechase Park, Trump proposed building a 160-foot-high (49 m) enclosed dome with recreational facilities and a convention center.

=== Closure ===
The Parachute Jump stopped operating as part of Steeplechase Park upon the latter's closure in 1964. Sources disagree on whether the ride closed permanently or continued to operate until as late as 1968. The Coney Island historian Charles Denson explained that the jump closed in 1964 but that many publications give an erroneous date of 1968. The nonprofit Coney Island History Project maintains that the attraction closed in 1964 and the 1968 date was based on an inaccurate newspaper article. The Guide to New York City Landmarks also mentions that the ride closed in 1964, while the Brooklyn Paper says the jump was shuttered in 1965. A New York Daily News article in 1965 said the Parachute Jump was nonoperational and had "been stripped of its wires and chutes". A New York World-Telegram article the following year described a plan to restore Steeplechase Park, which included turning the Parachute Jump into the "world's largest bird feeding station".

Several sources state that the jump operated until 1968. According to a press release in 1965, when the Parachute Jump was ostensibly still operating, it attracted half a million visitors per year. A Daily News article from 1973 states the ride closed in 1968. Consulting engineer Helen Harrison and the New York City Department of Parks and Recreation's website also cite a closure date of 1968, saying it was one of several small rides that were operated by concessionaires on the site of Steeplechase Park. According to Harrison, the last documented incident on the ride was on May 30, 1968, when a young girl was reported to have gotten stuck halfway through the drop.

== Post-closure ==
=== Acquisition of site ===
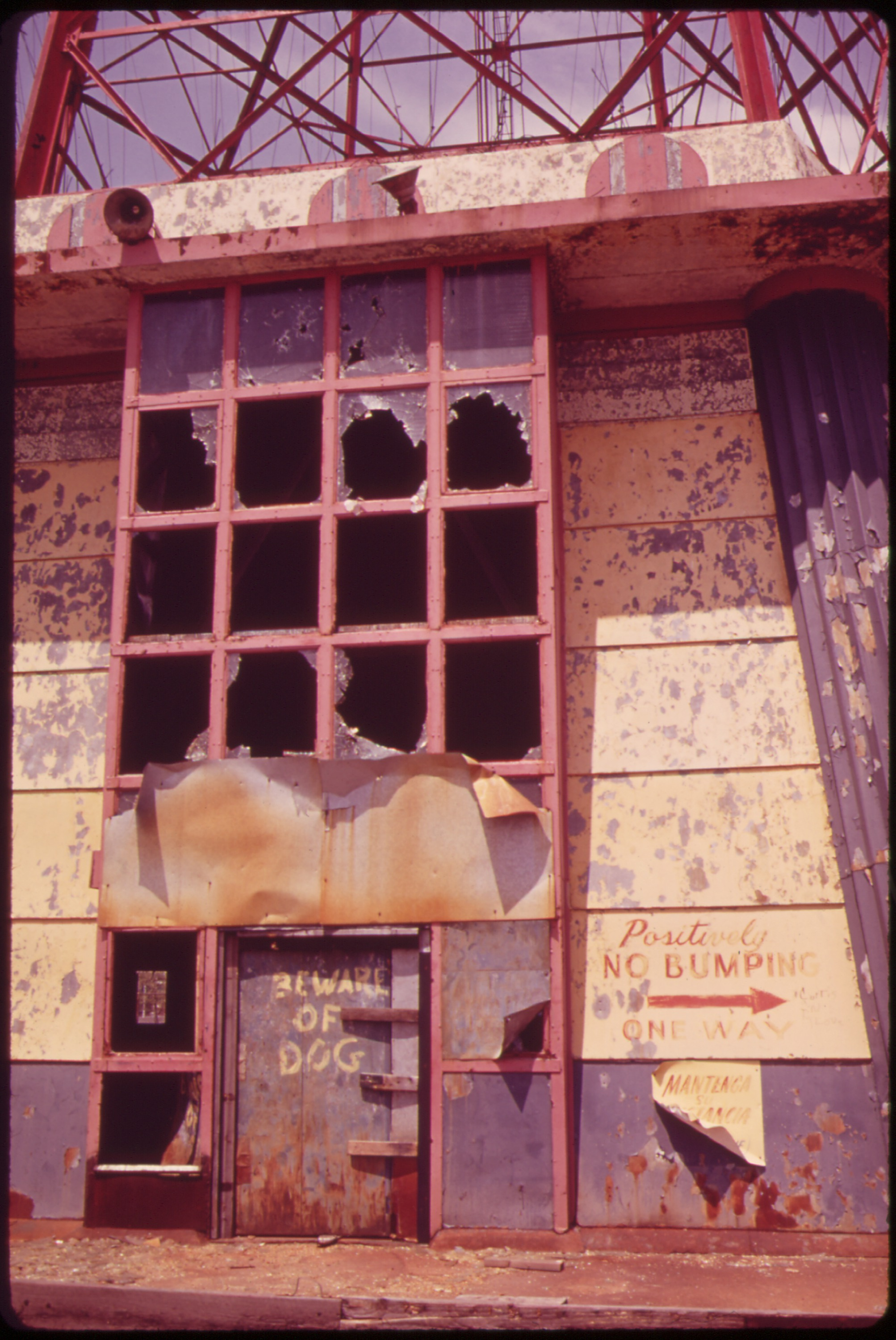
Entrance to abandoned Parachute Jump, 1973; photo by Arthur Tress. "Positively No Bumping" sign was from its go-kart use.

In 1966, the Coney Island Chamber of Commerce petitioned the New York City Landmarks Preservation Commission (LPC) to make the Parachute Jump an official city landmark. Trump, however, wanted to sell it as scrap and did not think it was old enough to warrant landmark status. Trump rented out the area around the base as a concession, and it was encircled by a small go-kart track. That October, the city announced a plan to acquire the 125 acres (51 ha) of the former Steeplechase Park so the land could be reserved for recreational use. The city voted in 1968 to acquire the site for $4 million (equivalent to $37 million in 2025). The city government planned to allow a concessionaire to continue operating the Parachute Jump through a temporary lease.

Control of the jump passed to New York City Department of Parks and Recreation (NYC Parks), the municipal government agency tasked with maintaining the city's recreational facilities. The agency attempted to sell the jump at auction in 1971 but received no bids. NYC Parks had planned to demolish the Parachute Jump if no one was willing to buy it. A study conducted in 1972 found the jump was structurally sound. At the time, there were proposals to give the tower landmark status and install a light show on it.

The city government unsuccessfully attempted to redevelop the Steeplechase site as a state park. By the late 1970s, the city government wanted to build an amusement park on the land. Norman Kaufman, who had run a small collection of fairground amusements on the Steeplechase site since the 1960s, was interested in reopening the Parachute Jump. Kaufman was evicted from the site in 1981, ending discussion of that plan.

=== Landmark status ===
After it was abandoned, the jump became a haunt for teenagers and young adults to climb, while the base became covered with graffiti. Despite its deterioration, it remained a focal point of the community; according to local legend, the tower could be seen from up to 30 miles (48 km) away. Organizations such as the Coney Island Chamber of Commerce and the Gravesend Historical Society decided to save the structure, though the LPC could not consider such a designation unless NYC Parks indicated it was not interested in developing the Parachute Jump site as a park. On July 12, 1977, the LPC designated the tower as a city landmark. When the designation was presented to the New York City Board of Estimate three months later, the board declined to certify the landmark designation. NYC Parks had said the structure would cost $10,000 a year to maintain. Despite the city's reluctance to designate the structure as a landmark, the Parachute Jump was placed on the National Register of Historic Places in 1980.

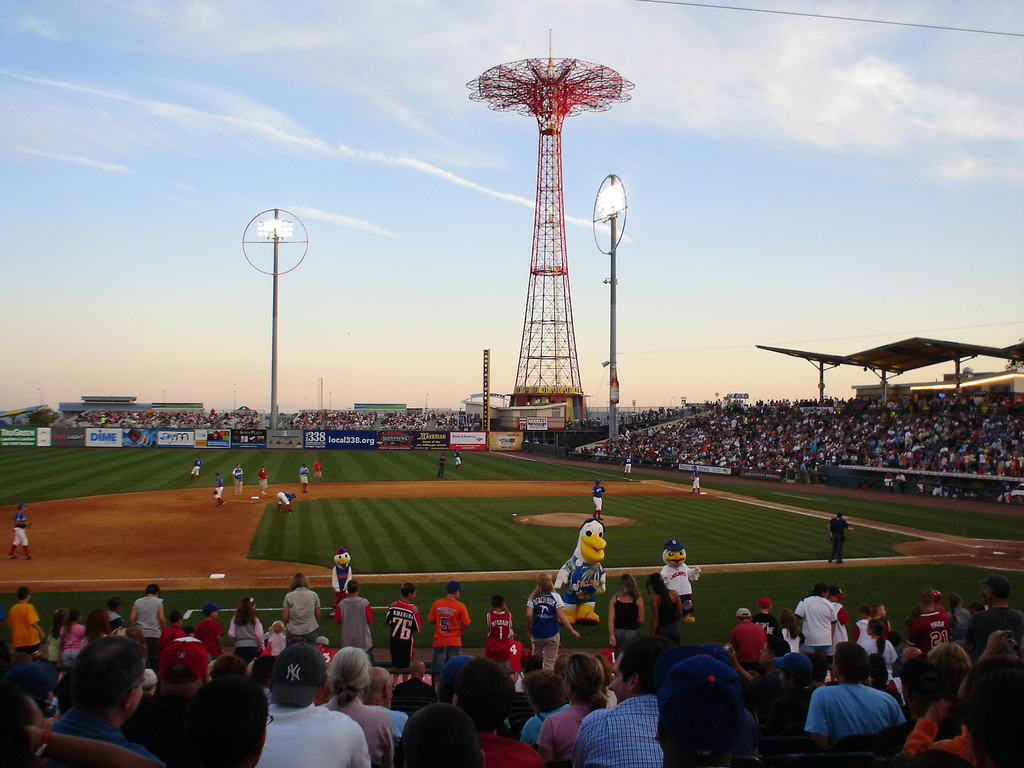
Seen from inside Maimonides Park

The city government questioned the tower's safety. A 1982 survey concluded the tower would need a $500,000 renovation to stabilize the ground underneath (equivalent to $1.7 million in 2025) and another $1 million to restore it to operating condition (about $3.3 million in 2025). The survey estimated it would cost at least $300,000 to demolish the structure (equivalent to $1,001,000 in 2025), making demolition too costly an option. The cheapest option, simply maintaining the structure, would have cost $10,000 a year (equivalent to $33,000 in 2025). The local community board recommended that the Parachute Jump be demolished if it could not be fixed, but NYC Parks commissioner Henry Stern said in January 1984 that his department had "decided to let it stand".

Stern dismissed the possibility of making the Parachute Jump operational again, calling it a "totally useless structure" and saying that even the Eiffel Tower had a restaurant. Stern said he welcomed the community's proposals for reusing the Parachute Jump but other agency officials said the plans presented thus far, which included turning the jump into a giant windmill, were "quixotic, at best". In the mid-1980s, restaurant mogul Horace Bullard proposed rebuilding Steeplechase Park; his plans included making the Parachute Jump operational again. At the time, the Parachute Jump was described as a "symbol of despair" because no real effort had been made to restore or clean up the structure.

In 1987, the LPC hosted meetings to determine the feasibility of granting landmark status to the Parachute Jump, Wonder Wheel, and Coney Island Cyclone. Two years later, on May 23, 1989, the LPC restored city landmark status to the Parachute Jump. Following this, the Board of Estimate granted permission for Bullard to develop his amusement park on the Steeplechase site, including reopening the Parachute Jump. These plans were delayed because of a lack of funds.

=== Restorations and lighting ===
In 1991, the city government announced an $800,000 (equivalent to $1,891,000 in 2025) expenditure to prevent the jump from collapsing, though there was insufficient funding in the city budget. The city government stabilized the structure in 1993 and painted it in its original colors, although the structure still suffered from rust in the salt air. The thrill-ride company Intamin was enlisted to determine whether the Parachute Jump could again be made operational. Bullard's redevelopment plan clashed with another proposal that would build a sports arena, such as a minor-league baseball stadium, on the site. The Bullard deal was negated in 1994, and the site directly north of the Parachute Jump was developed into a sports stadium, KeySpan Park, (Note: KeySpan Park became MCU Park in 2010 and Maimonides Park in 2021.) which opened in 2000.

The New York City Economic Development Corporation (NYCEDC) assumed responsibility for the tower in 2000. Originally, the city government wanted to reopen it as a functioning ride. The project was originally budgeted at $3,000,000 (equivalent to $5,608,700 in 2025), but the cost ultimately increased to $20,000,000 (equivalent to $37,391,300 in 2025), excluding the high insurance premiums that would need to be paid on the attraction. Because the cost of bringing the jump to safety standards would have been excessively high, the renovation was abandoned.

==== 2002 restoration and first lighting project ====
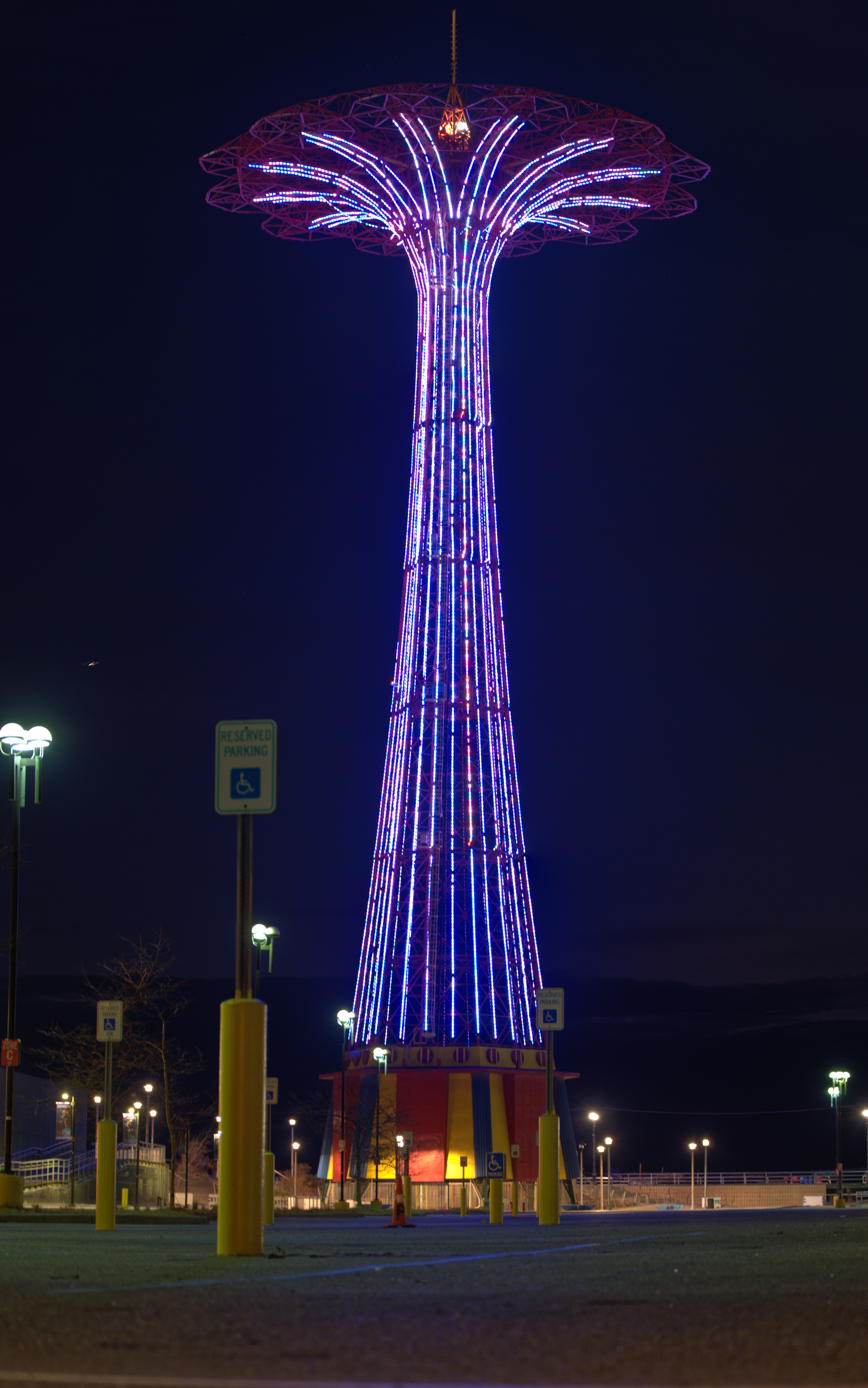
Lighting, seen at night

In 2002, the EDC started renovating the Parachute Jump for $5 million. The NYCEDC contracted engineering firm STV to rehabilitate the structure. The upper part of the tower was dismantled, about two-thirds of the original structure was taken down, some of it replaced, and the structure was painted red. The restoration was completed around July 2003. Afterward Brooklyn borough president Marty Markowitz started studying proposals to reuse or reopen the structure; an STV project manager said that the refurbished icon that "could only be appreciated during the day". In 2004, STV subcontracted Leni Schwendinger Light Projects to develop a night-time lighting concept for the Parachute Jump. Schwendinger contracted Phoster Industries for the LED portion of the lighting project. Markowitz's office, NYC Parks, the NYCEDC, Schwendinger, and STV collaborated for two years on the project, which cost $1.45 million.

The Coney Island Development Corporation and the Van Alen Institute held an architecture contest in 2004 to determine future uses for the 7,800-square-foot (720 m^{2}) pavilion at the jump's base. More than 800 competitors from 46 countries participated. The results were announced the following year; there were one winning team, two runners-up with cash prizes, and nine honorable mentions. The winning design outlined a bowtie-shaped pavilion with lighting and an all-season activity center, which included a souvenir shop, restaurant, bar, and exhibition space.

Schwendinger's lighting system consisted of 450 LEDs and 17 floodlamps. The first night-time light show was held on July 7, 2006. The installation contained six animations and used most colors except for green, which would not have been visible on the tower's red frame. The animations were based on events in the local calendar, including the boardwalk's operating and non-operating seasons, the lunar cycle, the Coney Island Mermaid Parade, and national holidays such as Memorial Day and Labor Day. There is also a sequence called "Kaleidoscope" for other holidays. Officials said the lights were to be left on from dusk to midnight during summer and from dusk to 11:00 p.m. the rest of the year. In observance of the "Lights Out New York" initiative, which sought to reduce bird deaths from light pollution, the tower lighting went dark at 11:00 p.m. during the bird migratory seasons.

==== 2013 restoration and second lighting project ====
Although Markowitz was initially satisfied with Schwendinger's light installation, by 2007 he was referring to her installation as "Phase I" of a multi-portion lighting upgrade. In February 2008, the city began planning a second phase of lights. Anti-climbing devices were installed on the Parachute Jump in 2010 after several instances of people scaling the structure, and the lights were temporarily turned off in 2011 because of a lack of maintenance. Concurrently, starting in 2011, the 2.2-acre (0.89 ha) site around the tower was redeveloped as Steeplechase Plaza.

A $2 million renovation was completed in 2013, after which it contained 8,000 LED lights, in comparison with the 450 total after the first installation. The B&B Carousell, an early-20th-century carousel that had become part of Luna Park, was relocated to Steeplechase Plaza east of the Parachute Jump in 2013. The tower was lit up for its first New Year's Eve Ball drop at the end of 2014, and since then, the Parachute Jump has been lit for New Year's Eve each year. The Parachute Jump has also been lit up in recognition of special causes, such as World Autism Awareness Day and Ovarian Cancer Awareness Month, as well as to commemorate notable personalities, such as happened after the 2020 death of retired NBA basketball player Kobe Bryant.

== Impact ==
When the Parachute Jump opened at the World's Fair, the Daily Times of Mamaroneck, New York, regarded the attraction as one of several "touches of the bizarre" at the fair. Because of its shape, the Parachute Jump has been nicknamed the "Eiffel Tower of Brooklyn". The New York Daily News compared the structure to an Erector Set toy in 1955, and another reporter for the same newspaper said in 2002 that the jump was "a rusting monument to the glory days of Coney Island". A writer for City Journal said that the structure resembled a mushroom. Several works of media, such as Little Fugitive (1953) and Requiem for a Dream (2000), have also been filmed at the Parachute Jump.

== See also ==
- 1939 New York World's Fair pavilions and attractions
- Amusement rides on the National Register of Historic Places
- List of New York City Designated Landmarks in Brooklyn
- National Register of Historic Places listings in Brooklyn

Similar attractions:

- Great Gasp – former parachute drop ride at Six Flags Over Georgia
- Jumpin' Jellyfish – parachute jump ride at Disney California Adventure
- Texas Chute Out – former parachute drop ride at Six Flags Over Texas
