= Bakunawa (roller coaster) =

Steel roller coaster in New Jersey, U.S.

- Bakunawa under construction in June 2026

Six Flags Great Adventure
- Location: Six Flags Great Adventure
- Park section: Shoreline Pier at the Boardwalk
- Coordinates: 40°08′20″N 74°26′16″W
- Status: Under construction
- Replaced: Green Lantern, Parachute Training Center: Edwards AFB Jump Tower, Twister

General statistics
- Type: Steel – Spinning – Launched
- Manufacturer: Mack Rides
- Lift/launch system: Linear synchronous motor
- Height: 382 ft (116 m)
- Length: 3,163 ft (964 m)
- Speed: 100 mph (160 km/h)
- Inversions: 1
- Duration: 2:17
- Height restriction: 48 in (122 cm)
- Trains: 2 trains with 5 cars; riders arranged 2 across in 2 rows for a total of 20 riders per train
- Theme: Bakunawa
- Website: www.sixflags.com/greatadventure/new-in-2027
- Bakunawa at RCDB

Bakunawa (officially named Bakunawa Serpent's Wrath; codenamed Project Purple) is an upcoming spinning launched shuttle roller coaster located at Six Flags Great Adventure in Jackson Township, New Jersey. Manufactured by Mack Rides, the coaster is planned to open in 2027. At a height of 382 feet (116 m), Bakunawa will be the third-tallest roller coaster in the world, and is set to be the first floorless spinning coaster and first ground up floorless coaster since Hot Wheels Nitro's 2013 debut at Imagicaa in India. The roller coaster is themed around the Bakunawa, a dragon-like serpent in Philippine mythology.

== History ==
On November 14, 2024—four months following the merger of Cedar Fair and the former Six Flags company—the newly-merged Six Flags company announced in a press release that Six Flags Great Adventure would receive a "record-breaking launch roller coaster" for the 2026 season. However, on July 28, 2025, the park sent an email to season pass holders stating that the roller coaster's opening had been delayed to "beyond 2026" due to additional time being required.

On February 18, 2026, the first piece of track arrived for the roller coaster, confirmed to be adjacent to the former Kingda Ka plot; Kingda Ka was demolished almost one year prior. Vertical construction began in March 2026 and was later nicknamed as "Project Purple". On May 15, 2026, the park announced its partnership with Project Purple, a nonprofit organization that raises awareness on pancreatic cancer. By June 22, 2026, the roller coaster had reached a height of 315 feet (96 m). It was topped off on July 1, 2026, at a height of 382 feet (116 m).

Multiple trademarks presumably intended for the roller coaster were filed with the United States Patent and Trademark Office, including "Phantom Spire" in January 2026 and "Gargantuan Vertical Vengeance" in June 2026. The roller coaster was officially unveiled on July 28, 2026, with the name Bakunawa. It is set to open in 2027 as part of the park's ongoing expansion of the Shoreline Pier at the Boardwalk area.

== Characteristics ==
Bakunawa will feature an upside-down linear synchronous motor launch on its zero-g stall, the first of its kind. It will be the tallest and fastest spinning roller coaster in the world, reaching heights of 382 feet (116 m) and speeds of 100 miles per hour (160 km/h). The trains will be floorless, the first of its kind on a spinning roller coaster.
