= Great Gasp =

Defunct parachute tower ride

Coordinates: 33.76938°N 84.55080°W

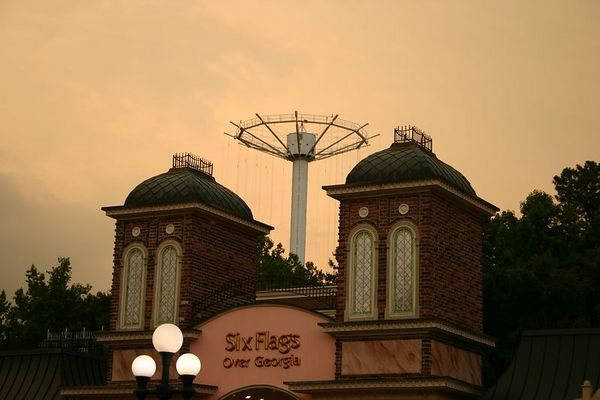
- The Great Gasp as seen near the park entrance

Six Flags Over Georgia
- Status: Removed
- Opening date: April 9, 1976
- Closing date: August 14, 2005
- Replaced by: Goliath

Ride statistics
- Manufacturer: Intamin
- Designer: Intamin
- Model: Parachute Tower 1200
- Height: 225 ft (69 m)
- Vehicle type: Parachute
- Vehicles: Parachutes
- Rows: 1

The Great Gasp was a 225-foot-tall (69 m) Intamin Paratower, a "Parachute Drop" ride, that towered over Six Flags Over Georgia for almost 30 years. It became a beacon for the park during this time. The ride was dismantled and removed from the park in 2005.

== History ==
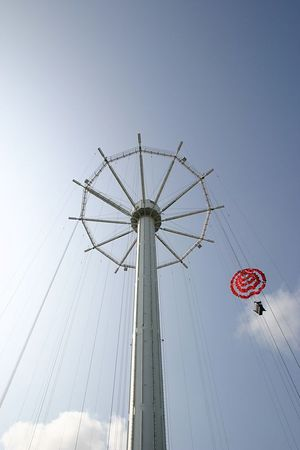
The Great Gasp in operation

When the Great Gasp opened on April 9, 1976, the ride was a masterpiece of engineering. The Great Gasp was derived from the Parachute Jump ride at the Coney Island in New York. Ride engineers from Intamin (also referred to as Ride Trade) developed the ride at their headquarters in Switzerland, and when the management from Six Flags Over Georgia visited, they knew the ride would be a great addition to their park. The ride was constructed for $1.5 million, a huge investment at the time. Similar Parachute Drop rides were also built at Six Flags Over Texas and Six Flags Over Mid-America.

The Great Gasp opened with 12 chutes; later the ride was modified to include four stations in which the passengers rode in the standing position. It featured a "chicken coop" for guests who were too scared to get on the ride. Over the years, the stand-up chutes were removed, and as riders dwindled, the number of chutes in use declined.

On August 14, 2005, Six Flags Over Georgia announced that the Great Gasp would cease operation forever. On the final weekend, riders were given "Last Gasp" pins in commemoration of the ride's last days. Within three weeks of "Last Gasp", the Great Gasp was dismantled and removed from the park.

== Operational features ==
A "Last Gasp" pin

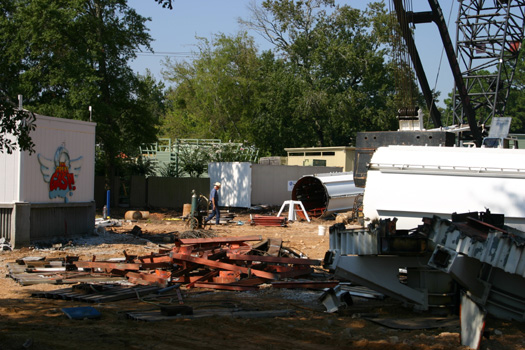
Pieces of the Great Gasp when the tower was in the midst of disassembly

Gasp opened with 12 chutes, although as the ride control system was upgraded and riders decreased, that number was reduced to 8 chutes.

Each seat held two riders, and was equipped with a seat belt and restraint bar. Stationary cables kept each chute stabilized and in the correct position. Another cable actually moved the seat vertically. Inside the tower was one counterweight for each chute.

The control system could detect empty seats as well as overloaded seats and would prevent cycling them. The control system hardware was located in the small ring housing at the base of the tower. An anemometer was mounted at the top of the ride, and was tied into the control system as to prevent operation when wind gusted above a preset limit.

A small elevator inside the tower allowed access to the winch and motor housing at the top. The tower also held antennas for in-park radio communications.

The Gasp served as a focal point of New Year's Eve celebrations in 1990. A huge "1991" sign was mounted, and fireworks were actually launched from the top ring of the Gasp while a "Peach" was dropped, much like the one still dropped in Atlanta, during the Holiday in the Park New Year's Eve celebration on December 31, 1990.

Pieces of the Great Gasp were sent to Six Flags Over Texas for spare parts on the Texas Chute Out ensuring it could stay in operation for the next few years. The Texas Chute Out closed on September 3, 2012, and was demolished by Dallas Demolition on October 10, 2012. It was replaced with the Texas Sky Screamer which is nearly twice as tall as the Texas Chute Out.
