= Texas Chute Out =

Defunct parachute drop ride

Coordinates: 32.7566°N 97.0670°W

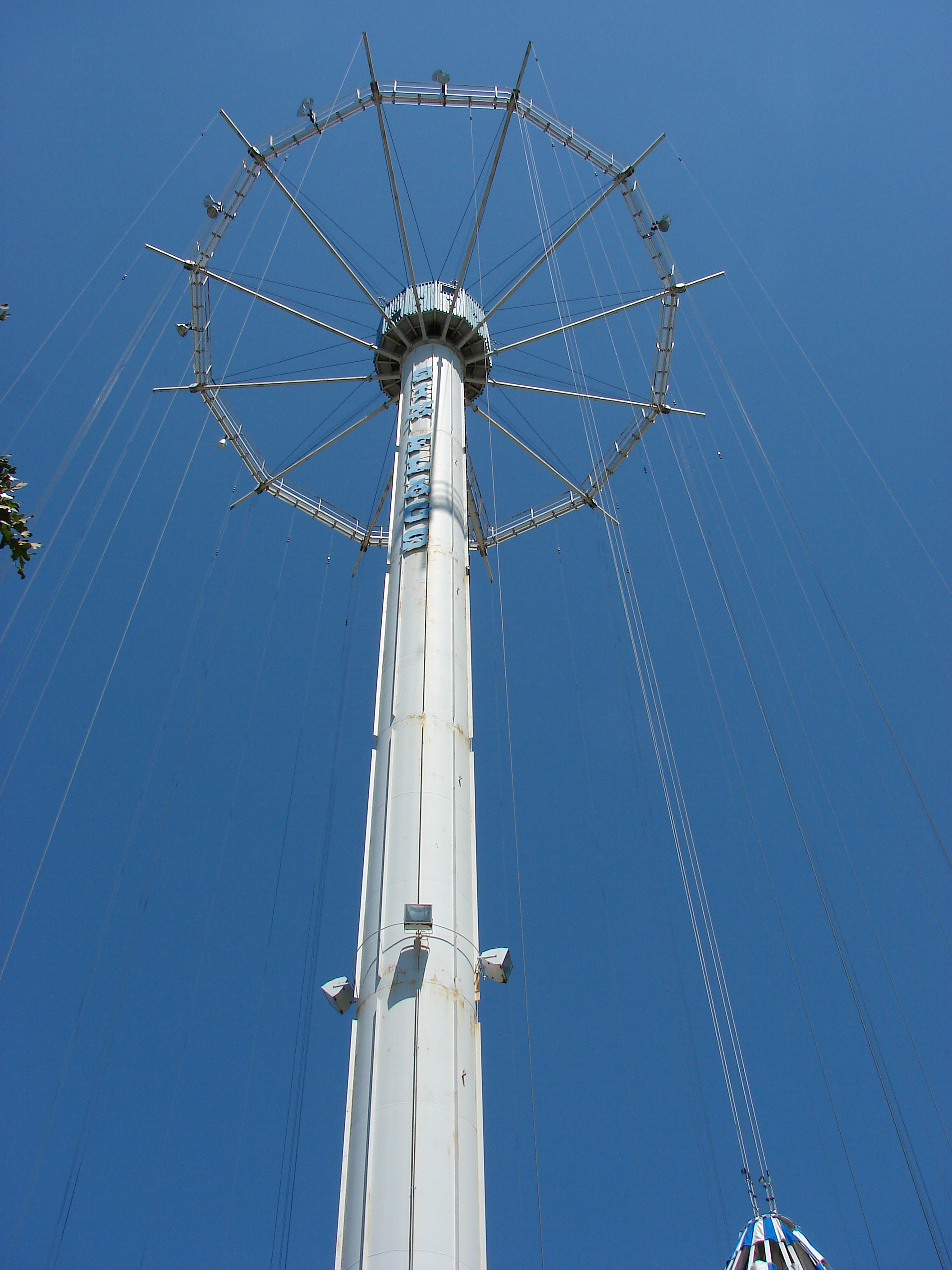

Six Flags Over Texas
- Area: Goodtimes Square
- Status: Removed
- Opening date: April 10, 1976
- Closing date: September 3, 2012
- Replaced by: Texas SkyScreamer

Ride statistics
- Manufacturer: Intamin
- Model: Parachute Tower 1200
- Height: 200 ft (61 m)
- Capacity: 1500 riders per hour
- Vehicle type: Parachute
- Vehicles: Parachutes

Texas Chute Out was a 200-foot-tall (61 m) Intamin "parachute drop" ride that operated at Six Flags Over Texas. It closed on September 3, 2012.

== History ==
When Texas Chute Out opened on April 10, 1976, the ride was a major engineering innovation at the park dominating the entrance to the parking lot. The ride was derived from the famed Parachute Jump ride at the legendary Coney Island in New York. Ride engineers from Intamin developed the ride, and then Six Flags purchased three Parachute Drop rides with two built at Six Flags Over Georgia and Six Flags Over Mid-America (now Six Flags St. Louis).

Texas Chute Out was the world's first and known as a "modern" parachute drop ride when it opened in 1976.

During Holiday in the Park, Texas Chute Out was decorated as a giant Christmas tree.

The ride began to operate with stand-up buckets in 1977. However, these were removed in 1994 due to safety concerns, and replaced with sit-down basket seats.

On August 2, 2012, Six Flags Over Texas announced the last chance to ride Texas Chute Out would be on September 3, 2012, before it closed along with the neighboring ride Flashback. Texas Chute Out was replaced by Texas SkyScreamer, a 400-foot (120 m) Funtime StarFlyer. On October 10, 2012, the Texas Chute Out was demolished with explosives by Dallas-based demolition firm Dallas Demolition to make room for construction of the Texas SkyScreamer. Dallas Demolition strategically cut the base of the ride, and added 14 pounds of C-4 explosives to the base to make it fall over in a specific direction.

== Ride ==
Texas Chute Out was located in Goodtimes Square, where riders of one to three, strap themselves onto to the bench where it then lifted riders to the top 200 feet or 61 metres. Once up top, the ride pauses to give riders a Bird's-eye view of the park and the Dallas–Fort Worth metroplex. After a couple of seconds the parachute then releases from the top and floats back down toward the ground.

Each seat held two riders, and was equipped with a seat belt and restraint bar. Stationary cables kept each chute stabilized and in the correct position. Another cable actually moved the seat vertically. Inside the tower was one counterweight for each chute. During the years, the ride allowed riders to stand during the ride, but this later stopped.

== See also ==
- 2012 in amusement parks
- Great Gasp, a similar ride found at Six Flags Over Georgia
