= Rage (roller coaster) =

Steel rollercoaster located in Adventure Island

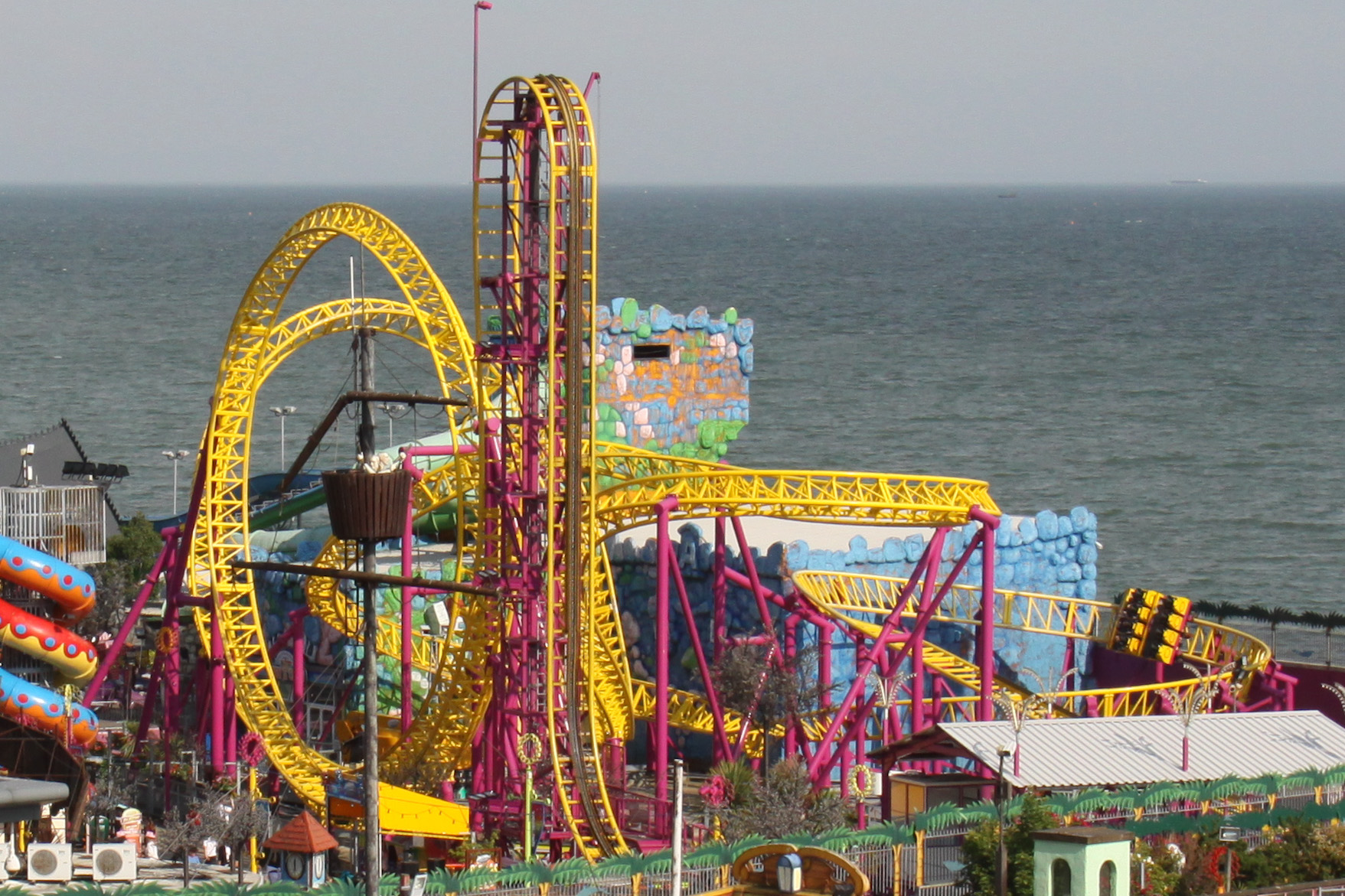

Adventure Island
- Location: Adventure Island
- Coordinates: 51°31′57″N 0°43′00″E
- Status: Operating
- Opening date: 10 February 2007
- Cost: £3 million

General statistics
- Type: Steel – Euro-Fighter
- Manufacturer: Gerstlauer
- Designer: Ingenieur Büro Stengel GmbH
- Model: Euro-Fighter Model 320+
- Height: 72 ft (22 m)
- Length: 1,184 ft (361 m)
- Speed: 43.5 mph (70.0 km/h)
- Inversions: 3
- Duration: 0:50
- Max vertical angle: 97°
- G-force: 4.5
- Rage at RCDB

Rage is a steel roller coaster located at Adventure Island in Southend-on-Sea, Essex, England. The attraction is a Gerstlauer Euro-Fighter model roller coaster. At 97 degrees, it is steeper-than-vertical and tied for the third steepest roller coaster in the United Kingdom. It is also tied six ways between itself, Fahrenheit, Speed: No Limits, SpongeBob SquarePants Rock Bottom Plunge, Typhoon, and Vild-Svinet.

== History and description ==
Designed by Werner Stengel, the coaster opened on 10 February 2007. When it was built, the coaster became the tallest structure in the park and one of the tallest structures in the nearby area. Riders on the coaster are offered expansive views of the nearby North Sea from the Southend-on-Sea beach. The coaster has a total of three inversions: a vertical loop, a cutback and a heartline roll. The coaster also has a helix near the end of the ride. As with other Euro-Fighter model coasters, the coaster has trains that consist of individual cars. Riders in these cars are in two rows of four, for a total of 8 riders. The base of the coaster is 197 feet (60 m) by 125 feet (38 m). The coaster layout for Rage is particularly close to two other Euro-Fighter (model 320+) roller coasters: Falcon at Duinrell amusement park and Untamed at Canobie Lake Park.

== Reviews ==
In 2009, Andy Akinwolere, a presenter for the Children's BBC show Blue Peter, rated Rage as the "most thrilling roller coaster" in the United Kingdom. Akinwolere, who wore a heart monitor to record his physiological reactions, reported that the coaster was "less scary than other rides, but...[offered] really intense excitement all the way through."

== Incidents ==
Rage attracted media attention when crows began nesting near the very top of the 72 feet (22 m) tall roller coaster. Despite the fact that the nest was mere inches from the track itself, engineers at the park examined the nest and its location and determined that the nest's location did not pose a threat to coaster riders or the birds. The crows were also observed to be seemingly undisturbed by the coaster's operation.

On 29 July 2023, Rage stopped abruptly, leaving eight passengers stranded 72 feet in the air at a 90-degree angle. Rescue teams safely returned the passengers to the ground within 40 minutes. The ride, which halted just before 14:00 resumed operation around 20:30 the same evening after thorough inspections. Marc Miller, the managing director of the Stockvale Group, explained that the stoppage was due to a computerised safety feature involving two independent computer systems designed to halt the ride if an issue is detected.
