= Gerstlauer Euro-Fighter =

Type of steel roller coaster

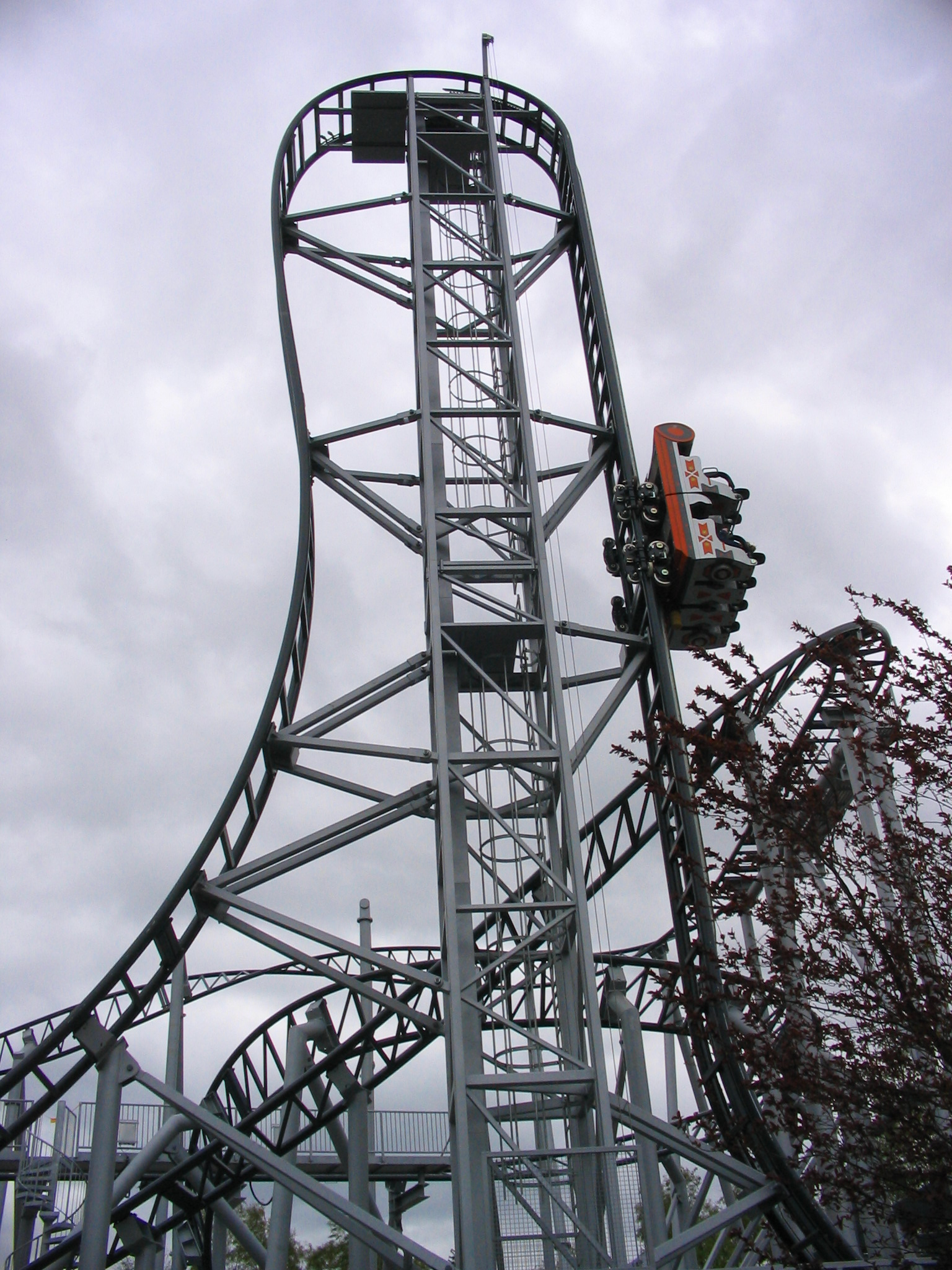
The vertical lift and 'beyond vertical' drop on Typhoon at Bobbejaanland, Belgium

The Euro-Fighter is a type of steel roller coaster developed by Gerstlauer. First launched in 2003, the trademark feature of the roller coaster is its beyond-vertical drop, which reaches an angle greater than 90 degrees. Although the majority of Euro-Fighters are custom designed for each installation, every design so far has included the trademark drop. A number of different track elements are possible, including vertical loops, diving loops and barrel rolls. Almost all Euro-Fighter models have a vertical chain-driven lift hill, although LSM launch systems are also available.

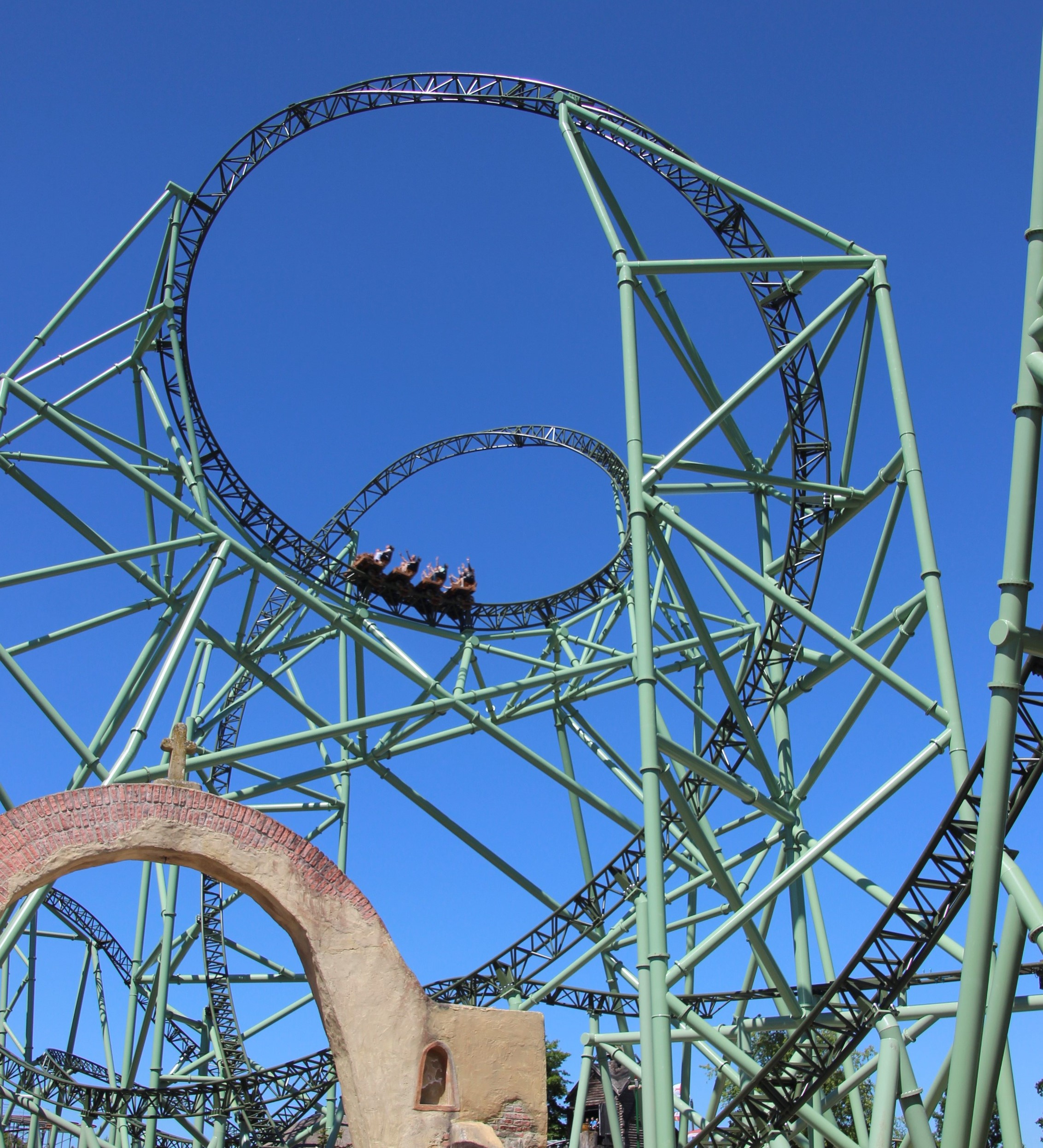
Euro-Fighter - Der Schwur des Kärnan (Oath of Kärnan) at Hansa-Park has unique vertical drop in the enclosed lift hill, and it is the only one of this kind.

Riders are transported in individual cars around the track, which feature two rows of four seats. Two exceptions are Huracan at the Belantis amusement park in Germany and Dare Devil Dive at Six Flags Over Georgia, which both feature cars similar to those used on Gerstlauer's launched roller coasters. The cars have over-the-shoulder restraints and may be themed (to an extent) according to the customer's requirements. Dare Devil Dive's cars were the first to use a new lap-bar only restraint system in 2011 and were used on several following models. Over-the-shoulder restraints continued to be offered on Euro-Fighters and an updated design eventually appeared on Defiance in 2022.

Flucht von Novgorod, located at Hansa Park in Germany, was the first Euro-Fighter to incorporate both a vertical lift and an LSM launch in the same circuit.

== Installations ==
Name	Model	Park	Country	Opened	Status
Vild-Svinet	Model 500/8	BonBon-Land	Denmark	2003	Operating
Typhoon	Model 670/8	Bobbejaanland	Belgium	2004	Operating
Speed: No Limits	Model 600	Walygator-Sud Ouest (formerly Oakwood Theme Park)	France ( formerly United Kingdom)	2006	In storage
Rage	Model 320+	Adventure Island	United Kingdom	2007	Operating
Mystery Mine	Custom	Dollywood	United States	2007	Operating
SpongeBob SquarePants Rock Bottom Plunge	Custom	Nickelodeon Universe Mall of America	United States	2008	Operating
SAW: The Ride	Custom	Thorpe Park	United Kingdom	2009	Operating
Falcon	Model 320+	Duinrell	Netherlands	2009	Operating
Flucht von Novgorod	Custom	Hansa Park	Germany	2009	Operating
Huracan	Custom	Belantis	Germany	2010	Operating
Dare Devil Dive	Custom	Six Flags Over Georgia	United States	2011	Operating
Untamed	Model 320+	Canobie Lake Park	United States	2011	Operating
Takabisha	Model 1000	Fuji-Q Highland	Japan	2011	Operating
Eurofighter	Model 320+	Zoosafari Fasanolandia	Italy	2011	Operating
Iron Shark	Model 380	Galveston Island Historic Pleasure Pier	United States	2012	Operating
Abyss	Custom	Adventure World	Australia	2013	Operating
Krater	Model 380	Colombian National Coffee Park	Colombia	2014	Operating
Serpent	Model 320+	Parc Sindibad	Morocco	2015	Operating
Predator	Model 320+	IMG Worlds of Adventure	United Arab Emirates	2016	Operating
Hydrus	Model 320	Casino Pier	United States	2017	Operating
Adrenaline Peak	Model 320	Oaks Amusement Park	United States	2018	Operating
Tantrum	Model 380	Six Flags Darien Lake	United States	2018	Operating
TMNT Shellraiser	Model 1000	Nickelodeon Universe American Dream	United States	2019	Operating
Vertika	Model 440	La Récré Des 3 Curés	France	2020	Operating
Defiance	Custom	Glenwood Caverns Adventure Park	United States	2022	Operating
Vindfald	Custom	Tivoli Friheden	Denmark	2024	Operating
Drakon	Custom	Paultons Park	United Kingdom	2026	Operating
