= Speed: No Limits =

Former steel roller coaster at Oakwood Theme Park

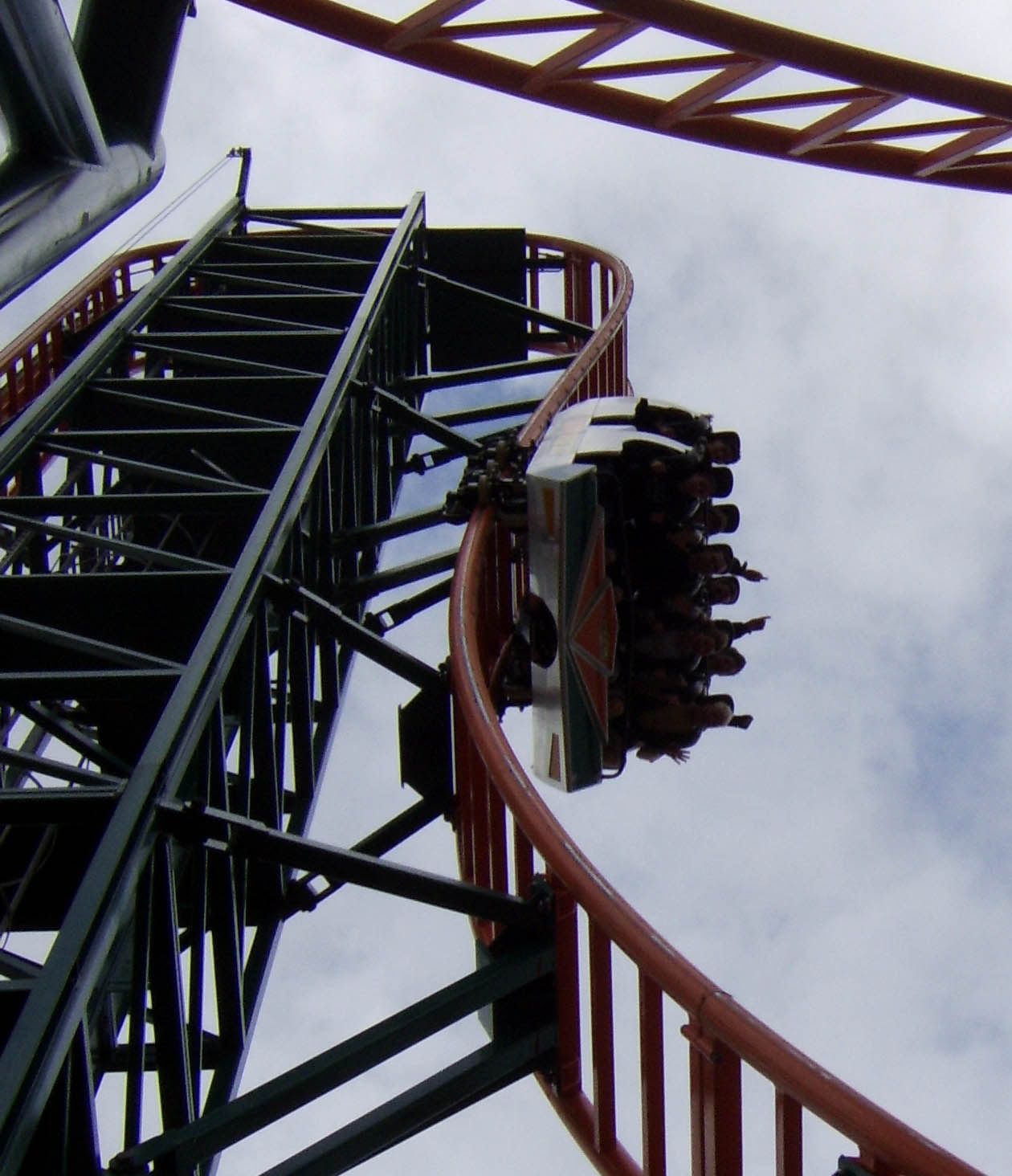
- Speed: No Limits' 97 degree drop

Oakwood Theme Park
- Location: Oakwood Theme Park
- Coordinates: 51.779°N 4.805°W
- Status: Removed
- Opening date: 13 April 2006
- Closing date: 3 November 2024
- Cost: £3,000,000

General statistics
- Type: Steel – Euro-Fighter
- Manufacturer: Gerstlauer
- Designer: Werner Stengel
- Track layout: Steel
- Lift/launch system: Vertical chain lift
- Height: 115 ft (35 m)
- Drop: 110 ft (34 m)
- Length: 1,970 ft (600 m)
- Speed: 59 mph (95 km/h)
- Inversions: 2
- Duration: 1:30
- Max vertical angle: 97°
- Capacity: 800 riders per hour
- G-force: 4.5
- Height restriction: 125 cm (4 ft 1 in)
- Trains: 4 trains with a single car. Riders are arranged 4 across in 2 rows for a total of 8 riders per train.
- Speed: No Limits at RCDB

Speed: No Limits was a steel roller coaster at Oakwood Theme Park in Pembrokeshire, Wales. It was manufactured by Gerstlauer and was the first Euro-Fighter model to be installed in the United Kingdom. The ride was installed by Ride Entertainment Group. It opened on 13 April 2006, and operated until 3 November 2024. It has since been relocated to Walygator Sud-Ouest in Agen, France.

Its lift hill was 35 metres (115 ft), and it featured top speeds of 95 km/h (59 mph). The ride had two inversions, and exerted a maximum of 4.5 Gs on riders.

It featured a vertical chain lift hill and a 97° first drop. This drop gave it a five-way tie for the record of steepest roller coaster drop between itself, Rage, Fahrenheit, SpongeBob SquarePants Rock Bottom Plunge, Vild-Svinet and Typhoon, until Steel Hawg took the record in 2008.

== Trains ==
The ride had four trains, each consisting of two rows with four across seating, for a total of eight riders per train. The trains featured over-the-shoulder restraints.

== Ride experience ==
Upon dispatch from the station, the train made a right-hand turn before ascending the 35-metre (115 ft) vertical chain lift hill. This was followed by a 34-metre (110 ft) beyond-vertical first drop at an angle of 97°, reaching a top speed of 95 km/h (59 mph). The train then traversed a camelback hill and entered an overbanked turn at 110°, which led into a vertical loop before rising into a block brake section. Following a small dip, the train navigated a heartline roll, then turned left with a slight incline and entered a double helix that led into the final brake run. The train completed the circuit with a right-hand turn returning to the station. The full ride lasted approximately one minute and 30 seconds.

== Photo gallery ==
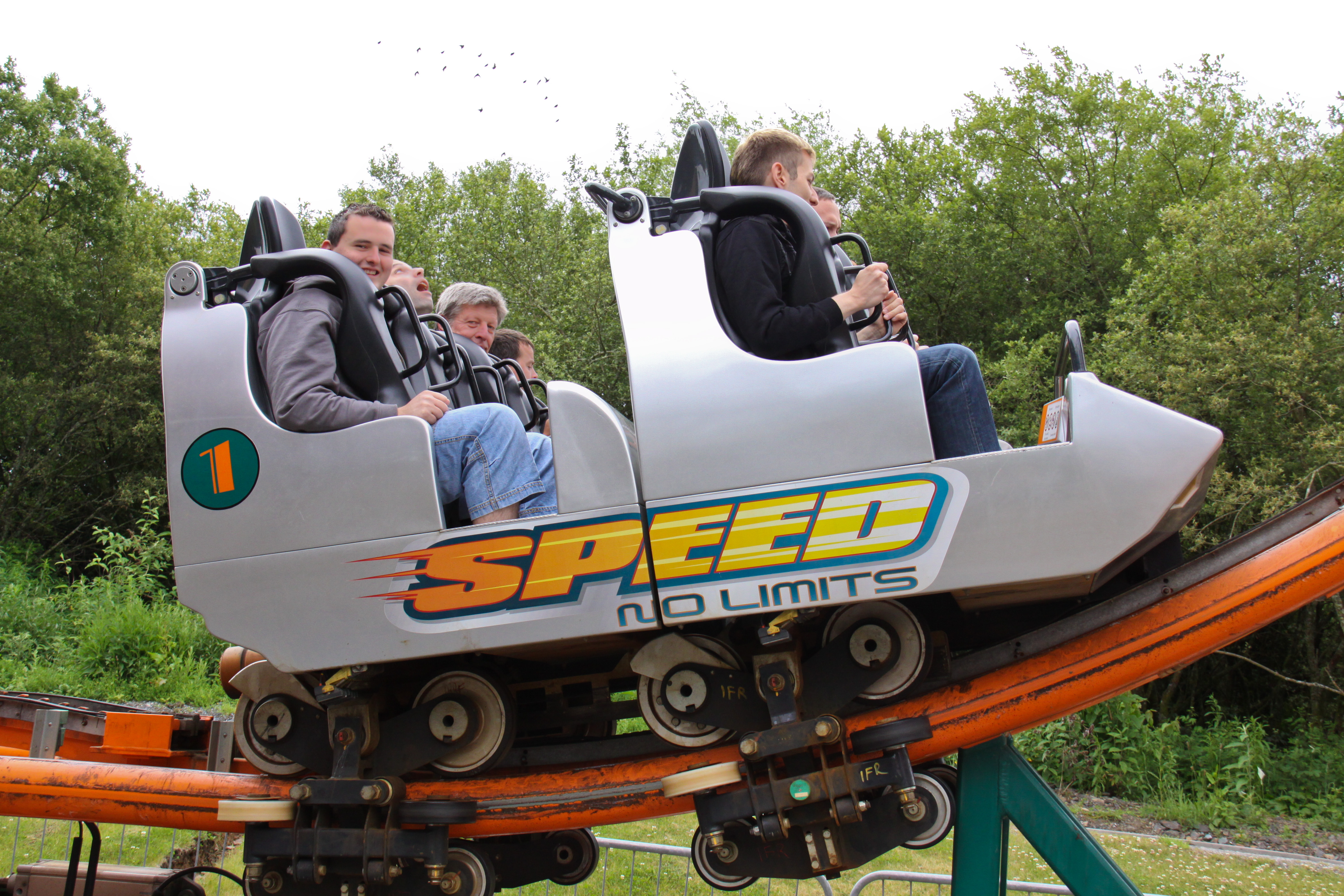
One of Speed: No Limit's trains

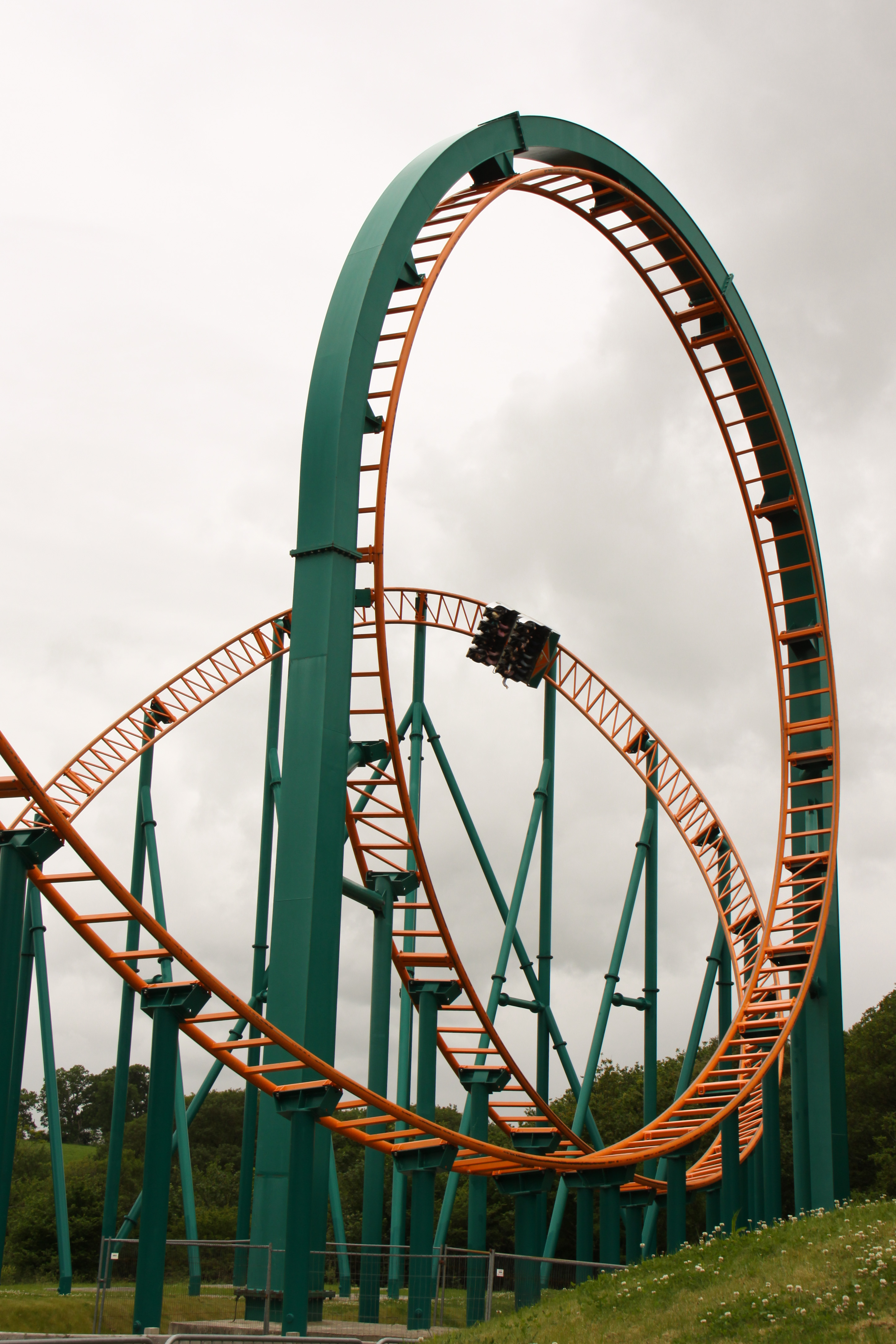
The first inversion, a vertical loop

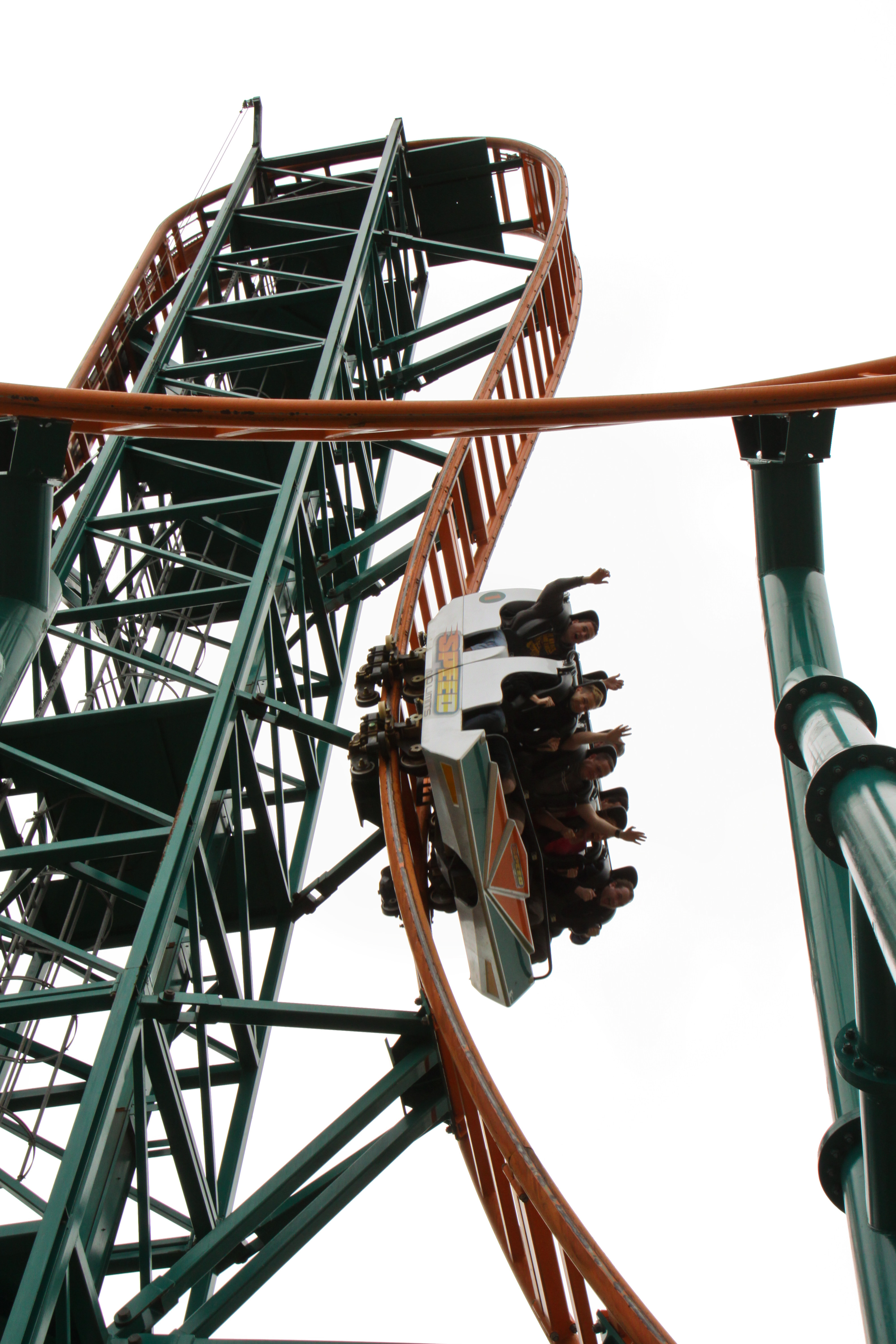
The first drop

== Records ==
| World's steepest roller coaster April 13, 2006 – July 5, 2008; 97° | Succeeded by Steel Hawg; 111° |
