= Belantis =

Amusement park in Germany

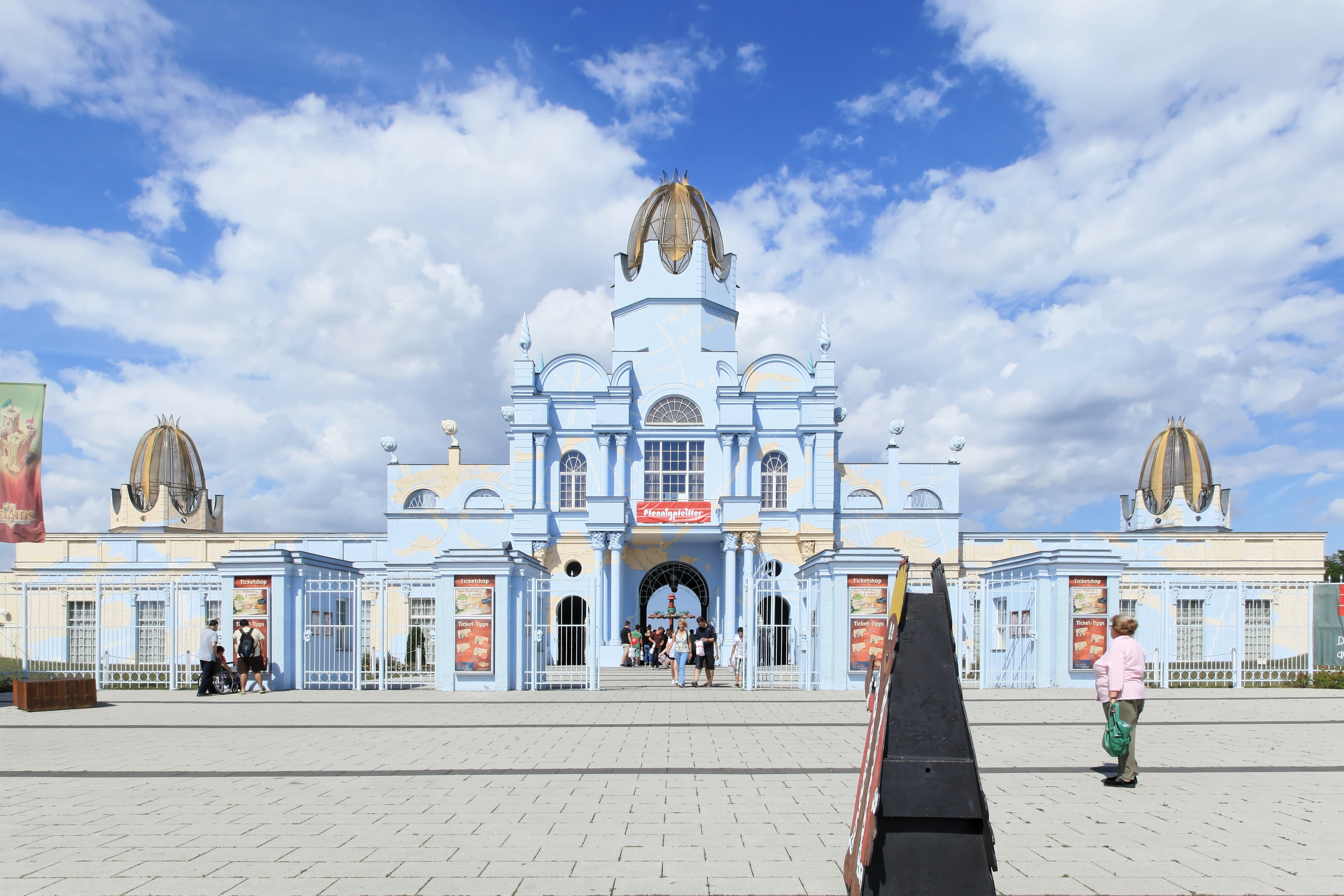
- Belantis entrance
- Interactive map of Belantis
- Coordinates: 51°15′6.5″N 12°18′55″E
- Status: Operating
- Opened: 2003
- Owner: Compagnie des Alpes
- Attendance: 600,000
- Area: 27 ha (67 acres)

Attractions
- Roller coasters: 4
- Water rides: 4

Belantis is a theme park near Leipzig, Germany. Covering 27 hectares and featuring over 60 attractions, including four roller coasters, it is the largest amusement park in central and eastern Germany. The park received around 300,000 visitors in 2024.

== History ==
The park was previously run by Parques Reunidos from 2018 to 2025; in April it was announced that Compagnie des Alpes had taken over ownership. They announced in December 2025 that they will convert it into a Parc Astérix.

== Attractions ==
=== Roller coasters ===
Ride Name	Picture	Opened	Manufacturer	Model/Type	Max. Height	Length	Area	Notes
Huracan		2010	Gerstlauer	Euro-Fighter	32 m	560 m	Reich der Sonnentempel	Steeper than vertical first hill, second Euro-Fighter after Escape of Novgorod in Germany
Cobra des Amun Ra		2015	Gerstlauer	Family Coaster 360	15 m	360 m	Tal der Pharaonen	
Drachenritt		2003	Gerstlauer	Bobsled Coaster Custom			Insel der Ritter	
Huracanito		2014	Gerstlauer	Kiddy Racer	1.8 m	23 m	Reich der Sonnentempel	

=== Water rides ===
Ride Name	Picture	Type	Opened	Manufacturer	Length	Area
Fluch des Pharao		Log flume	2003	Hafema	425 m	Tal der Pharaonen
Fahrt des Odysseus		Tow boat ride	2003	Bear Rides	500 m	Strand der Götter
Gletscher-Rutscher		Water slides	2003	Metallbau Emmeln	100 m	Land der Grafen
Kanus		Canoes	2006			Prärie

=== Further attractions ===
Name	Picture	Type	Opened	Manufacturer	Area
Anca		Mini Top Spin	2017	SBF Visa Group	Reich der Sonnentempel
Aqua Plantscha		Water playground	2003		Küste der Entdecker
Belanitus Rache		Frisbee	2005	HUSS Park Attractions	Prärie
BELANTIS Waldlehrpfad		Nature trail			Land der Grafen
Buddel-Bahn		Train ride	2005		Schloss BELANTIS
Buddel-Karussell		Merry go round	2003	Peter Petz	Schloss BELANTIS
Buddel-Kreisel		Swing ride	2003		Schloss BELANTIS
Buddel-Tanz		Tanzender Pavillon	2012	Gerstlauer	Schloss BELANTIS
Capt'n Black's Piratentaufe		Tilt Tower	2006	abc Rides	Küste der Entdecker
Drachenflug		Condor	2004	Huss	Insel der Ritter
Flug des Ikarus		Skydive	2003	Sunkid Heege GmbH	Strand der Götter
Götterflug		Sky Roller	2004	Gerstlauer	Strand der Götter
Labyrinth von Avalon		Hedge maze			Insel der Ritter
Pfad der Mutigen		Parcours			Prärie
Poseidons Flotte		Wild Water Rondell	2007	Zierer	Strand der Götter
Robins Versteck		Playground			Insel der Ritter
Santa Maria		Pirate ship	2003	Huss	Küste der Entdecker
Säule der Athene		Lifting tower	2003	Sunkid Heege GmbH	Strand der Götter
Tempelabenteuer		Playground			Reich der Sonnentempel
Tempelrallye		Mini auto parcours	2014		Reich der Sonnentempel
Verlies des Grauens		Madhouse	2003	Vekoma	Insel der Ritter
Wild-West-Express		Train ride	2014		Prärie
Wüstenexpedition		Playground			Tal der Pharaonen
Wüstenrallye		Mini autos			Tal der Pharaonen

== Gallery ==
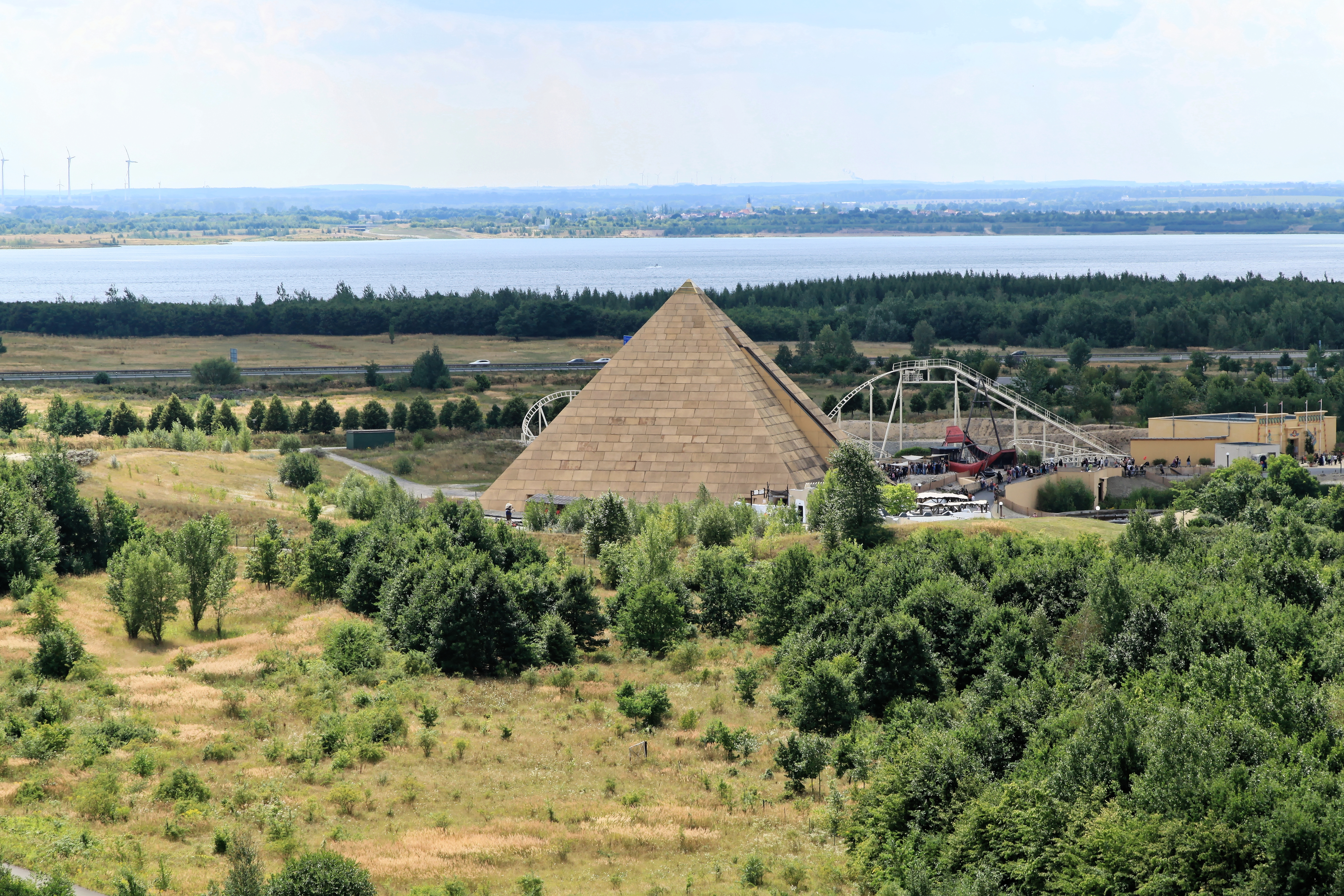
Pyramid of Fluch des Pharao

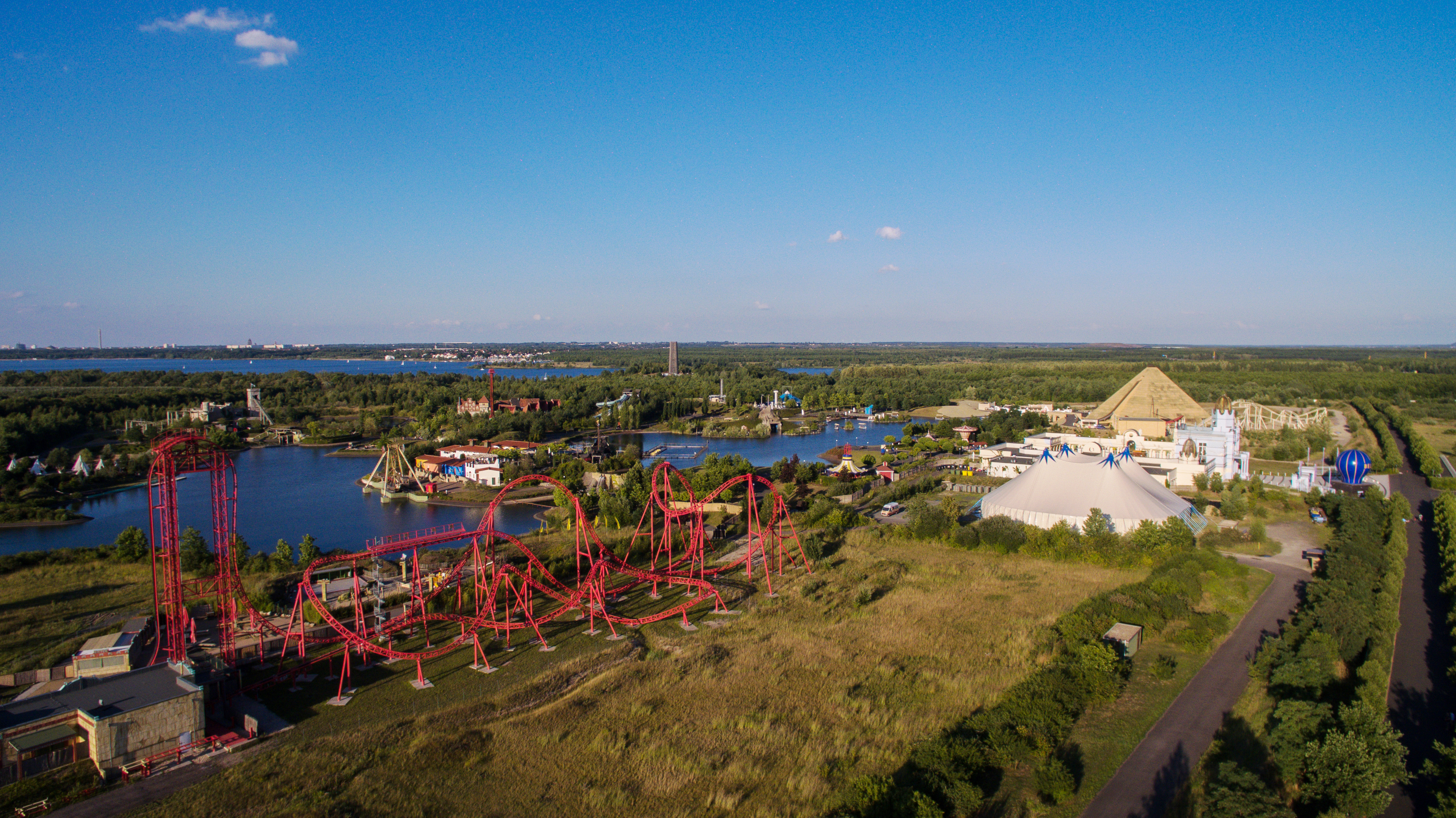
Belantis in 2015

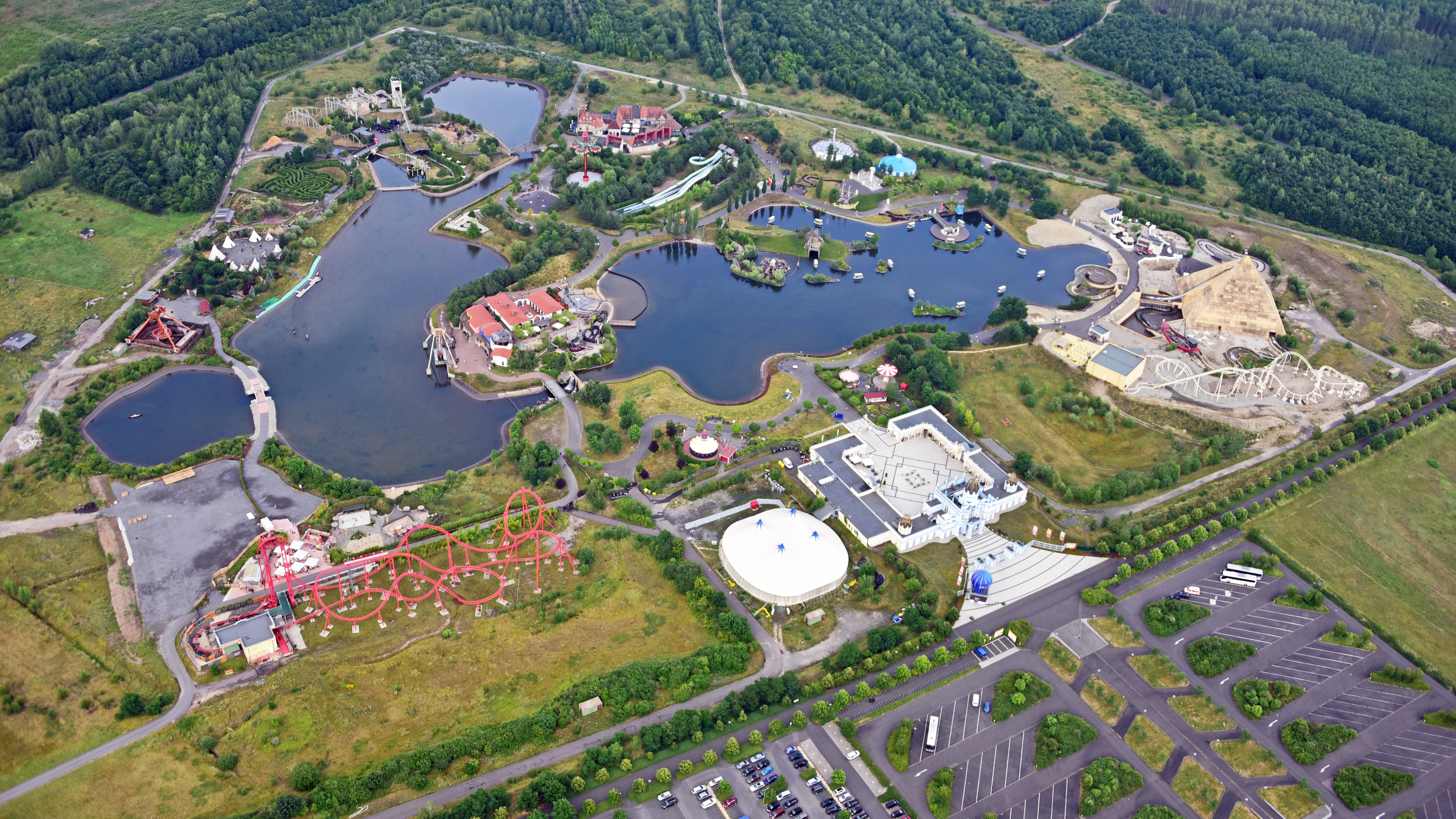
Aerial view in 2017
