= Huracan (Belantis) =

Steel roller coaster at Belantis

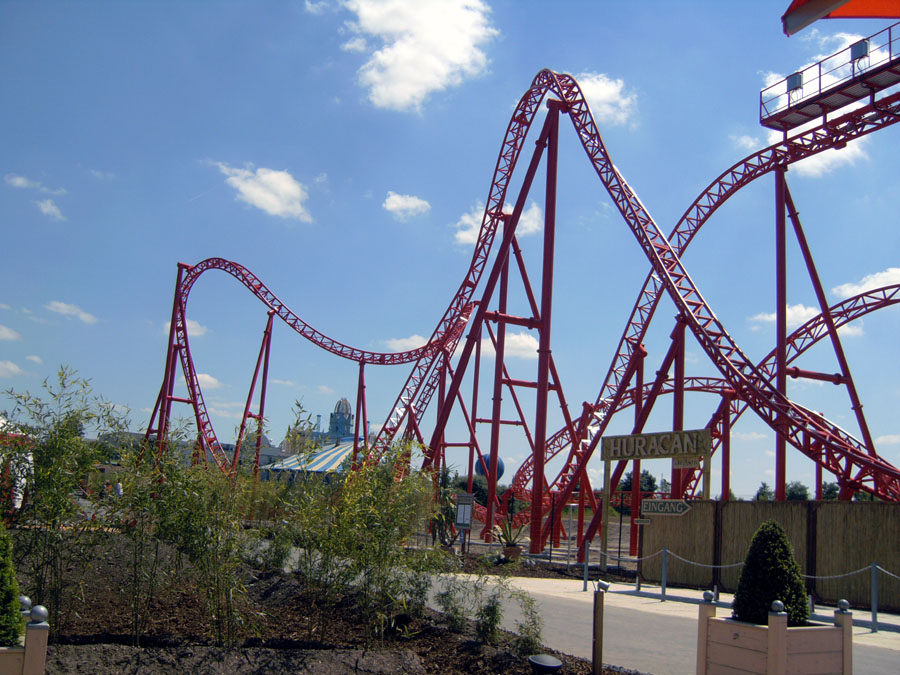

Belantis
- Location: Belantis
- Coordinates: 51.253122°N 12.312455°E
- Status: Operating
- Opening date: 26 June 2010
- Cost: €5,000,000

General statistics
- Type: Steel – Euro-Fighter
- Manufacturer: Gerstlauer
- Designer: Werner Stengel
- Height: 32 m (105 ft)
- Length: 560 m (1,840 ft)
- Speed: 85 km/h (53 mph)
- Inversions: 5
- Duration: 1:30
- Max vertical angle: 97°
- Capacity: 800 riders per hour
- G-force: 4.3
- Height restriction: 130 cm (4 ft 3 in)
- Theme: Maya mythology
- Huracan at RCDB

Video

Huracan is a steel roller coaster at Belantis amusement park in Leipzig, Germany. Huracan is one of two Gerstlauer Euro-Fighter model roller coasters in Germany, the other being Fluch von Novgorod.

== History ==
Huracan was originally intended to be delivered to the proposed F1-X Dubai amusement park in Dubai, but the 2008 financial crisis and the Great Recession led to the cancellation of the coaster's installation in Dubai. Instead, the coaster was acquired by Belantis amusement park for €5,000,000 and the coaster was opened on 26 June 2010. Nikolaus Job, the CEO of Belantis has stated he expected the installation of Huracan would lead to a 10 to 15 percent growth in visitor volume.

The installation of Huracan has also led to other rides at Belantis being themed to match Huracan. For example, a kiddie coaster—and one of the smallest kiddie coasters in the world—was built to match Huracan. This coaster was built in 2014, is only 23 metres (75 ft) in length, and is named Huracanito.

== Layout and theme ==
As with all Euro-Fighters, Huracan's most noteworthy feature is its steeper-than-vertical first hill, which falls at an angle of 97 degrees. The coaster has a total of five inversions, including a cobra roll, zero-g roll, and interlocking corkscrews. Although the coaster has a Mayan theme to it, the coaster structure's red paint job reflects its former destination at a Formula One-themed amusement park. The coaster is unusual for a Euro-Fighter in that its cars have three rows of two seats per car, instead of the more traditional two rows of four seats per car.
