= Gerstlauer =

German manufacturer of amusement rides and roller coasters

Coordinates: 48°18′36″N 10°26′59″E

Gerstlauer Amusement Rides GmbH
- Gerstlauer Amusement Rides GmbH logo
- Type: Private
- Industry: Manufacturing
- Founded: 1982; 44 years ago
- Founder: Hubert Gerstlauer
- Headquarters: Münsterhausen, Bavaria, Germany
- Area served: Worldwide
- Key people: Siegfried Gerstlauer (managing director)
- Products: Amusement rides and roller coasters
- Website: www.gerstlauer-rides.de

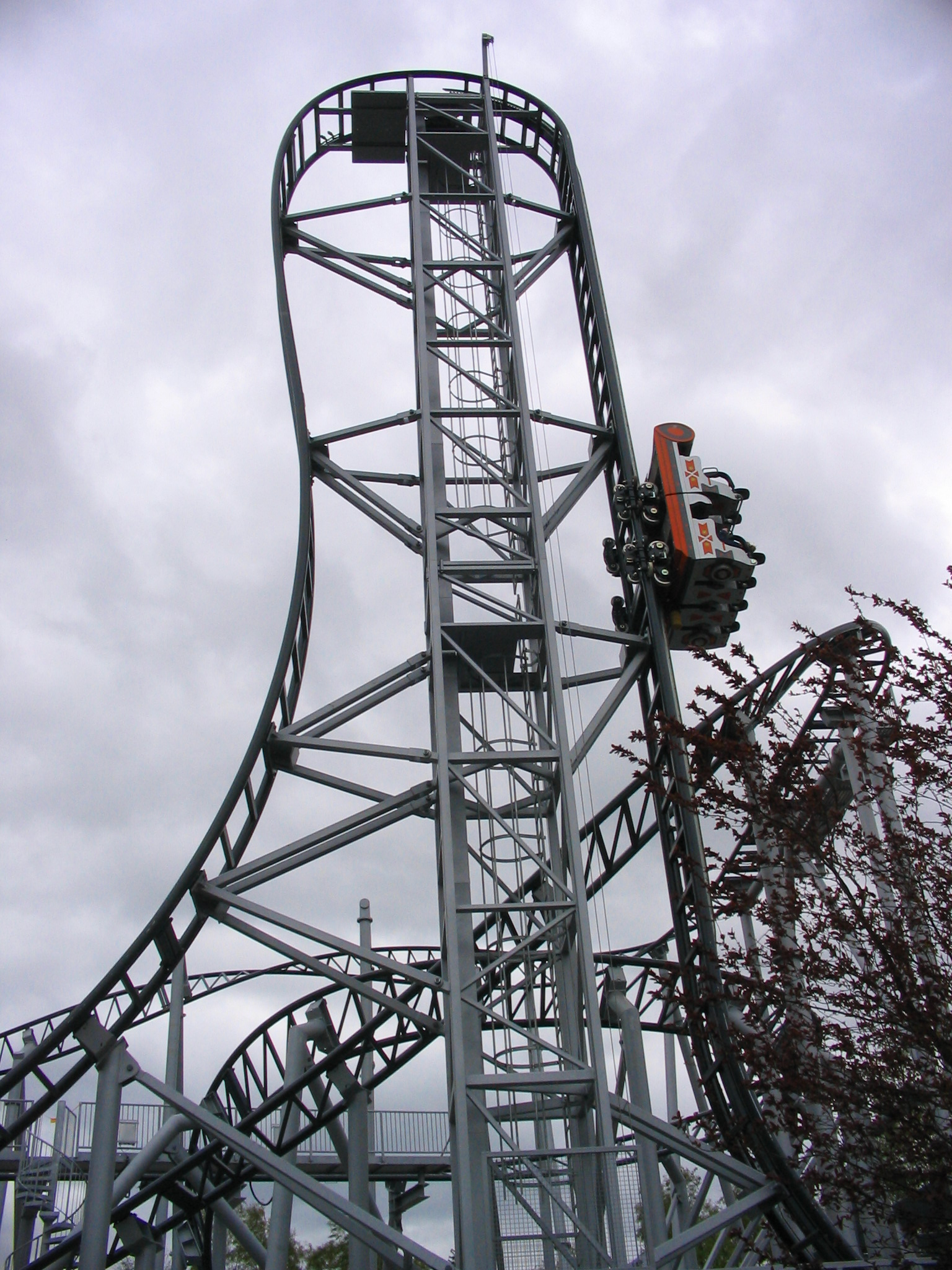
Lift and 97 degree first drop of the Gerstlauer Euro-Fighter Typhoon at Bobbejaanland.

Gerstlauer Amusement Rides GmbH is a German manufacturer of stationary and transportable amusement rides and roller coasters, located in Münsterhausen, Germany. As of May 2024, all 113 Gerstlauer-made rollercoasters are still in operation and at their original park, apart from Seifenkiste at Trampolino Familien- und Freizeitpark, which is currently in storage, and Pandemonium at Six Flags Discovery Kingdom, which now operates at Six Flags Mexico under the name of Joker. On May 31, 2013, Gerstlauer's highly anticipated, world record beating rollercoaster, The Smiler, was opened, taking the record from Colossus and 10 Inversion Roller Coaster.

== History ==
In 1982, Hubert Gerstlauer, a former employee of the Anton Schwarzkopf-owned Schwarzkopf Industries GmbH company founded his own company, named Gerstlauer Elektro GmbH. With this new Gerstlauer-named company, he delivered electric and pneumatic equipment for Schwarzkopf's facilities. After final bankruptcy of Schwarzkopf Industries GmbH in 1992, Gerstlauer Elektro GmbH acquired part of their production sites and facilities, and continued the manufacture of amusement rides and roller coasters. In March 2007, Gerstlauer Elektro GmbH was subsequently renamed Gerstlauer Amusement Rides GmbH.

Gerstlauer's first own-designed and manufactured roller coaster, the 'G'sengte Sau', a bobsled roller coaster, was built in Erlebnispark Tripsdrill, an amusement park in Baden-Württemberg, south-eastern Germany. Since 2003, Gerstlauer became popular with their Euro-Fighter roller coaster, which is present in different styles in Europe and the United States. A specific design feature of all Euro-Fighter roller coasters is a drop with a 'beyond vertical' angle of more than 90 degrees. Another model is their spinning roller coaster, in which the riders are seated facing each other.

Gerstlauer also built trains for several wooden roller coasters, though several of which are no longer operating. Examples of these include The Boss at Mid America Adventure, USA.

== List of Gerstlauer designed rides ==
=== Gerstlauer roller coasters ===
As of August 2024, Gerstlauer Amusement Rides GmbH has built 115 roller coasters around the world.

List of Gerstlauer roller coasters
Name	Model	Location	Country	Opened	Status	Refs
G'sengte Sau (de)	Bobsled Coaster Model 480/4	Erlebnispark Tripsdrill	Germany	1998	Operating	
Oachkatzl	Family Coaster 300/4	Märchenwald im Isartal	Germany	1999	Operating	
Thor's Hammer	Bobsled Coaster Model 480/4	Djurs Sommerland	Denmark	2002	Operating	
Drachenritt	Bobsled Coaster Custom	Belantis	Germany	2003	Operating	
Vilda Musen	Bobsled Coaster Custom	Gröna Lund	Sweden	2003	Operating	
Vild-Svinet	Euro-Fighter 500/8	BonBon-Land	Denmark	2003	Operating	
Drachenjagd	Junior Coaster Drachenjagd	Legoland Deutschland	Germany	2003	Operating	
Fairly Odd Coaster; Formerly Timberland Twister	Spinning Coaster Model 420/4	Nickelodeon Universe inside the Mall of America	United States	2004	Operating	
Heiße Fahrt; Formerly Klotticoaster	Bobsled Coaster Custom	Wild- und Freizeitpark Klotten/Cochem (de)	Germany	2004	Operating	
Coastersaurus	Junior Coaster Drachenjagd	Legoland California	United States	2004	Operating	
Typhoon	Euro-Fighter 670/8	Bobbejaanland	Belgium	2004	Operating	
Spinning Dragons	Spinning Coaster Model 420/4	Worlds of Fun	United States	2004	Operating	
Aqua Wind	Bobsled Coaster Model 380/4	Lagunasia	Japan	2004	Operating	
Pandemonium; Formerly Mr. Six's Pandemonium	Spinning Coaster Model 420/4 (Variant)	Six Flags New England	United States	2005	Operating	
Raven; Formerly Cobra	Bobsled Coaster Model 450/4	Paultons Park	United Kingdom	2006	Operating	
Rage	Euro-Fighter 320+	Adventure Island	United Kingdom	2007	Operating	
Pandemonium; Formerly Big Spin; Formerly Tony Hawk's Big Spin	Spinning Coaster Model 420/4 (Extended)	Six Flags Fiesta Texas	United States	2007	Operating	
Mystery Mine	Euro-Fighter Custom	Dollywood	United States	2007	Operating	
Pandemonium; Formerly Tony Hawk's Big Spin	Spinning Coaster Model 420/4 (Extended)	Mid America Adventure	United States	2007	Operating	
Han-Katten	Spinning Coaster Model 380/4	BonBon-Land	Denmark	2007	Operating	
Galaxy Orbiter	Spinning Coaster Custom	Galaxyland Amusement Park inside West Edmonton Mall	Canada	2007	Operating	
SpongeBob SquarePants Rock Bottom Plunge	Euro-Fighter Custom	Nickelodeon Universe inside the Mall of America	United States	2008	Operating	
Troublesome Trucks Runaway Coaster	Junior Coaster Custom	Drayton Manor	United Kingdom	2008	Operating	
Pandemonium; Formerly Big Spin; Formerly Tony Hawk's Big Spin	Spinning Coaster Model 420/4 (Extended)	Six Flags Over Texas	United States	2008	Operating	
Lynet	Launch Coaster 540	Fårup Sommerland	Denmark	2008	Operating	
Dubai Drone; Formerly Spin Gear	Spinning Coaster Custom	VR Park Dubai	United Arab Emirates	2010	Operating	
Saw - The Ride	Euro-Fighter Custom	Thorpe Park	United Kingdom	2009	Operating	
Anubis: The Ride	Launch Coaster 600	Plopsaland	Belgium	2009	Operating	
Escape of Novgorod	Euro-Fighter Custom	Hansa-Park	Germany	2009	Operating	
Falcon	Euro-Fighter 320+	Duinrell	Netherlands	2009	Operating	
Spinning Coaster	Spinning Coaster Custom	Infunity	Kuwait	2010	Operating	
Huracan	Euro-Fighter Custom	Belantis	Germany	2010	Operating	
Midgard Serpent	Family Coaster 200	Hansa-Park	Germany	2011	Operating	
Dare Devil Dive	Euro-Fighter Custom	Six Flags Over Georgia	United States	2011	Operating	
Gipfelstürmer	Family Shuttle Coaster Custom	Freizeitpark Ruhpolding	Germany	2011	Operating	
Untamed	Euro-Fighter 320+	Canobie Lake Park	United States	2011	Operating	
Van Helsing's Factory	Bobsled Coaster Custom	Movie Park Germany	Germany	2011	Operating	
Vicky The Ride	Spinning Coaster Custom	Plopsaland Ardennes	Belgium	2011	Operating	
Takabisha	Euro-Fighter 1000	Fuji-Q Highland	Japan	2011	Operating	
Eurofighter	Euro-Fighter Custom	Zoosafari Fasanolandia	Italy	2011	Operating	
TNT Tren De La Mina	Family Coaster Custom	Parque de Atracciones de Madrid	Spain	2012	Operating	
Dragon Fly	Family Coaster 360	Duinrell	Netherlands	2012	Operating	
Iron Shark	Euro-Fighter 380	Galveston Island Historic Pleasure Pier	United States	2012	Operating	
Gold Rush	Family Shuttle Coaster 200	OK Corral	France	2012	Operating	
Gekion Live Coaster; Formerly Veil Of Dark	Spinning Coaster Custom	Tokyo Joypolis	Japan	2012	Operating	
The Joker; Formerly Pandemonium; Formerly Tony Hawk's Big Spin	Spinning Coaster Model 380/4	Six Flags Mexico; Six Flags Discovery Kingdom	Mexico	2013; 2008 to 2012	Operating	
The Smiler	Infinity Coaster Custom	Alton Towers	United Kingdom	2013	Operating	
Rattenmühle	Bobsled Coaster Custom	Familypark	Austria	2013	Operating	
Karacho	Infinity Coaster Custom	Erlebnispark Tripsdrill	Germany	2013	Operating	
Abyss	Euro-Fighter Custom	Adventure World	Australia	2013	Operating	
Titan	Kiddy Racer	Tierpark Essehof	Germany	2014	Operating	
Seifenkiste	Kiddy Coaster Kiddy Racer	Trampolino Familien- Und Frezeitpark	Germany	2014	In Storage	
FireChaser Express	Family Coaster Custom	Dollywood	United States	2014	Operating	
Eril's Seifenkiste	Kiddy Coaster Kiddy Racer	Erlebnispark Steinau	Germany	2014	Operating	
Seifenkiste	Kiddy Coaster Kiddy Racer	Jaderpark	Germany	2014	Operating	
Huracanito	Kiddy Coaster Kiddy Racer	Belantis	Germany	2014	Operating	
Kráter	Euro-Fighter 380	Parque Del Café	Colombia	2014	Operating	
Serpent	Euro-Fighter 320+	Sindibad	Morocco	2015	Operating	
Herkules	Kiddy Coaster Kiddy Racer	Familypark	Austria	2015	Operating	
Maskerade	Spinning Coaster Custom	Wiener Prater	Austria	2015	Operating	
Junker	Infinity Coaster Custom	PowerLand	Finland	2015	Operating	
Rewind Racers	Family Shuttle Coaster 181	Adventure City	United States	2015	Operating	
The Oath of Kärnan	Infinity Coaster Custom	Hansa-Park	Germany	2015	Operating	
Cobra Des Amun Ra	Family Coaster 360	Belantis	Germany	2015	Operating	
Spin Runway	Spinning Coaster Custom	Yomiuriland	Japan	2016	Operating	
The Monster	Infinity Coaster Custom	Adventureland	United States	2016	Operating	
Predator	Euro-Fighter 320+	IMG Worlds of Adventure	United Arab Emirates	2016	Operating	
Green Hornet: High Speed Chase	Bobsled Coaster Custom	Motiongate	United Arab Emirates	2016	Operating	
Madagascar Mad Pursuit	Infinity Coaster Custom	Motiongate	United Arab Emirates	2017	Operating	
Smurfs Village Express	Junior Coaster Custom	Motiongate	United Arab Emirates	2017	Operating	
Hydrus	Euro-Fighter 320	Casino Pier	United States	2017	Operating	
Vikingcoaster	Kiddy Coaster Kiddy Racer	Rabkoland	Poland	2017	Operating	
Cobralino	Kiddy Coaster Kiddy Racer	Conny-Land	Switzerland	2017	Operating	
Kiddy-Racer	Kiddy Coaster Kiddy Racer	Potts Park	Germany	2017	Operating	
Gold Rush	Infinity Coaster Custom	Attractiepark Slagharen	Netherlands	2017	Operating	
Kampala Express	BOB Coaster Kampala	Knuthenborg Safaripark	Denmark	2017	Operating	
Pégase Express	Family Coaster Custom	Parc Astérix	France	2017	Operating	
Hilly-Billy-Race	Kiddy Coaster Kiddy Racer	Tier- und Freizeitpark Thüle	Germany	2017	Operating	
HangTime	Infinity Coaster Custom	Knott's Berry Farm	United States	2018	Operating	
Adrenaline Peak	Euro-Fighter 320	Oaks Amusement Park	United States	2018	Operating	
Tantrum	Euro-Fighter 380	Six Flags Darien Lake	United States	2018	Operating	
Tiki-Waka	Bobsled Coaster 515/4	Walibi Belgium	Belgium	2018	Operating	
Speed Rockets	Bobsled Coaster Custom	Jardin d'Acclimatation	France	2018	Operating	
Yippe	Family Coaster Custom	Parque Del Café	Colombia	2018	Operating	
Family Coaster	Family Coaster 360	Land Of Legends Theme Park	Turkey	2018	Operating	
TMNT Shellraiser	Euro-Fighter 1000	Nickelodeon Universe Theme Park inside the American Dream Meadowlands	United States	2019	Operating	
The Shredder	Spinning Coaster Custom	Nickelodeon Universe Theme Park inside the American Dream Meadowlands	United States	2019	Operating	
Mystic	Infinity Coaster Custom	Walibi Rhône-Alpes	France	2019	Operating	
Fury	Infinity Coaster Custom	Bobbejaanland	Belgium	2019	Operating	
Panic Coaster – Back Daaan	Family Coaster Custom	Tokyo Dome City	Japan	2019	Operating	
Gold Rusher	Bobsled Coaster 390/4	Tatzmania Löffingen	Germany	2019	Operating	
Vertika	Euro-Fighter Custom	La Récré Des 3 Curés	France	2020	Operating	
Wakala	Family Coaster Custom	Bellewaerde	Belgium	2020	Operating	
Pitts Special	Infinity Coaster Custom	PowerLand	Finland	2020	Operating	
G'sente Sau	Bobsled Coaster Custom	Wiener Prater	Austria	2020	Operating	
Merkant	BOB Coaster Custom	Mandoria	Poland	2021	Operating	
Valkyrie	Family Shuttle Coaster 200	Gyeongju World	South Korea	2021	Operating	
Boomerang	Family Shuttle Coaster 181	Luna Park Sydney	Australia	2021	Operating	
Lipovitan Rocket ☆ Luna	Family Suspended Coaster	Yomiuriland	Japan	2021	Operating	
Fyr & Flamme	BOB Coaster Custom	Hunderfossen Familiepark	Norway	2022	Operating	
Defiance	Euro-Fighter Custom	Glenwood Caverns Adventure Park	United States	2022	Operating	
FirleFranz	Family Coaster	Bayern Park	Germany	2023	Operating	
Storm: The Dragon Legend	Infinity Inverted Coaster	Tusenfryd	Norway	2023	Operating	
Bucklbahn	BOB Coaster Kampala	Eis Greissler Manufaktur	Austria	2023	Operating	
Avix	Infinity Inverted Coaster	Parque del Cafe	Colombia	2024	Operating	
Vindfald	Euro-Fighter Custom	Tivoli Friheden	Denmark	2024	Operating	
Ziegel-Blitz	Bobsled Coaster Custom	Jaderpark	Germany	2024	Operating	
Défi du Dragon	Family Coaster	Jardin d'Acclimatation	France	2025	Operating	
Mecalodon	Airtime Coaster	Walibi Belgium	Belgium	2025	Operating	
Cétautomatix	Spinning Coaster Custom	Parc Astérix	France	2025	Operating	
100% Wolf	Family Coaster Custom	Plopsaland Deutschland	Germany	2026	Operating	
Cornwall Coaster	Family Coaster Custom	Hansa-Park	Germany	2026	Operating	
Drakon	Eurofighter Custom	Paultons Park	United Kingdom	2026	Operating	
Palindrome	Infinity Coaster Custom	COTAland	United States	2026	Under Construction	
Unknown	Bobsled Coaster 515/4	Mandoria	Poland	2026	Under Construction	
Unknown; Formerly Speed: No Limits	Euro-Fighter Custom	Walygator Sud-Ouest; Oakwood Theme Park	France	2026; 2006 to 2024	Under Construction	
Zéphyr	Euro-Fighter 380	Parc Ange Michel	France	TBD	In Storage	

=== Other Gerstlauer amusement rides ===
In addition to roller coasters, Gerstlauer Amusement Rides GmbH has also manufactured a range of flat rides and track rides.

List of Gerstlauer attractions
Name	Location	Country	Model	Opened	Status	Ref
Air-Meeting	Nigloland	France	Sky Fly	2012	Operating	
Air Racers	Suzuka Circuit Park	Taiwan	Sky Fly	2015	Unknown	
Aerospin	Liseberg	Sweden	Sky Roller	2016	Operating	
Amara Aviators	Lost Island Theme Park	United States	Sky Fly	2022	Operating	
Buddel-Tanz	Belantis	Germany	Dancing Pavillon	2012	Operating	
Dragon Racer's Rally	Universal Epic Universe	United States	Sky Fly	2025	Operating	Two separate rides of which will be located in the How to Train Your Dragon themed area, labelled as Project 903.
Duell der Adler	Bayern-Park	Germany	Sky Fly	2016	Operating	Name translates to "Duel of the Eagles".
Enchanted Eagle	Enjoy Animal Kingdom	China	Sky Fly	2020	Operating	Chinese: 奇翼飞鹰.
Fly France	Global Village Dubai	United Arab Emirates	Sky Fly	2017	Operating	
Flying Döner	Karls Erlebnis-Dorf	Germany	Sky Fly	2025	Under construction	
Flying Macaw	Camel Republic	Thailand	Sky Fly	2014	Operating	
Flying Ninjago	Legoland Deutschland	Germany	Sky Fly	2012	Operating	
Flying Ninjago	Legoland Japan	Japan	Sky Fly	Unknown	Operating	
Gokuraku Pilot	Sagamiko Resort	Japan	Sky Fly	2016	Operating	
Grande Roue	Nigloland	France	Giant Wheel	2009	Operating	
Höhenflug	Erlebnispark Tripsdrill	Germany	Sky Fly	2017	Operating	Name translates to "Soaring".
Jett Fly	Majaland Kownaty	Poland	Sky Fly	2021	Operating	
Jukebox	Liseberg	Sweden	Polyp	2012	Operating	
Kärnapulten	Hansa-Park	Germany	Sky Fly	2017	Operating	
Leonardos Flugmaschine	Familypark Neusiedlersee	Austria	Sky Fly	2015	Operating	
Majas Wilde Schwestern	Karls Erlebnis-Dorf	Germany	Sky Fly	2021	Operating	Name translates to "Maja's Wild Sisters".
Mowgli in the Dino Land	Dream Island	Russia	Sky Fly	2020	Operating	Ride identified as Flight School, or Лётная школа, on park website
Pixarus - Flight School of Magic	Toverland	The Netherlands	Sky Fly	2023	Operating	
Red Arrow Sky Force	Blackpool Pleasure Beach	United Kingdom	Sky Fly	2015	SBNO	
Schwaben Express	Schwaben Park	Germany	Bayern Express	1995	Operating	
Sky Fighter	Land of Legends	Turkey	Sky Fly	2018	Operating	
Sky Fly	Plopsaland Deutschland	Germany	Sky Fly	2015	Operating	Also identified as Air Show on Gerstlauer's website.
Sky Fly	Majaland Warschau	Poland	Sky Fly	2022	Operating	
Skyhawk	Canada's Wonderland	Canada	Sky Roller	2016	Operating	
Tail Spin	Dreamworld	Australia	Sky Fly	2014	Operating	
Teenage Mutant Ninja Turtles Shell Shock	Nickelodeon Universe - Mall of America	United States	Sky Fly	2012	Operating	Replaced Tak Attack.
Tentekomai	Fuji-Q Highland	Japan	Sky Roller	2016	Operating	
Wild Wings	Duinrell	Netherlands	Sky Fly	2016	Operating	
Wings of Icarus/The Icarus Race	VinWonders Phú Quốc	Vietnam	Sky Roller	2020	Operating	Ride identified as Wings of Icarus on Gerstlauer's website, but is referred to as "The Icarus Race" by VinWonders.

== Gallery ==
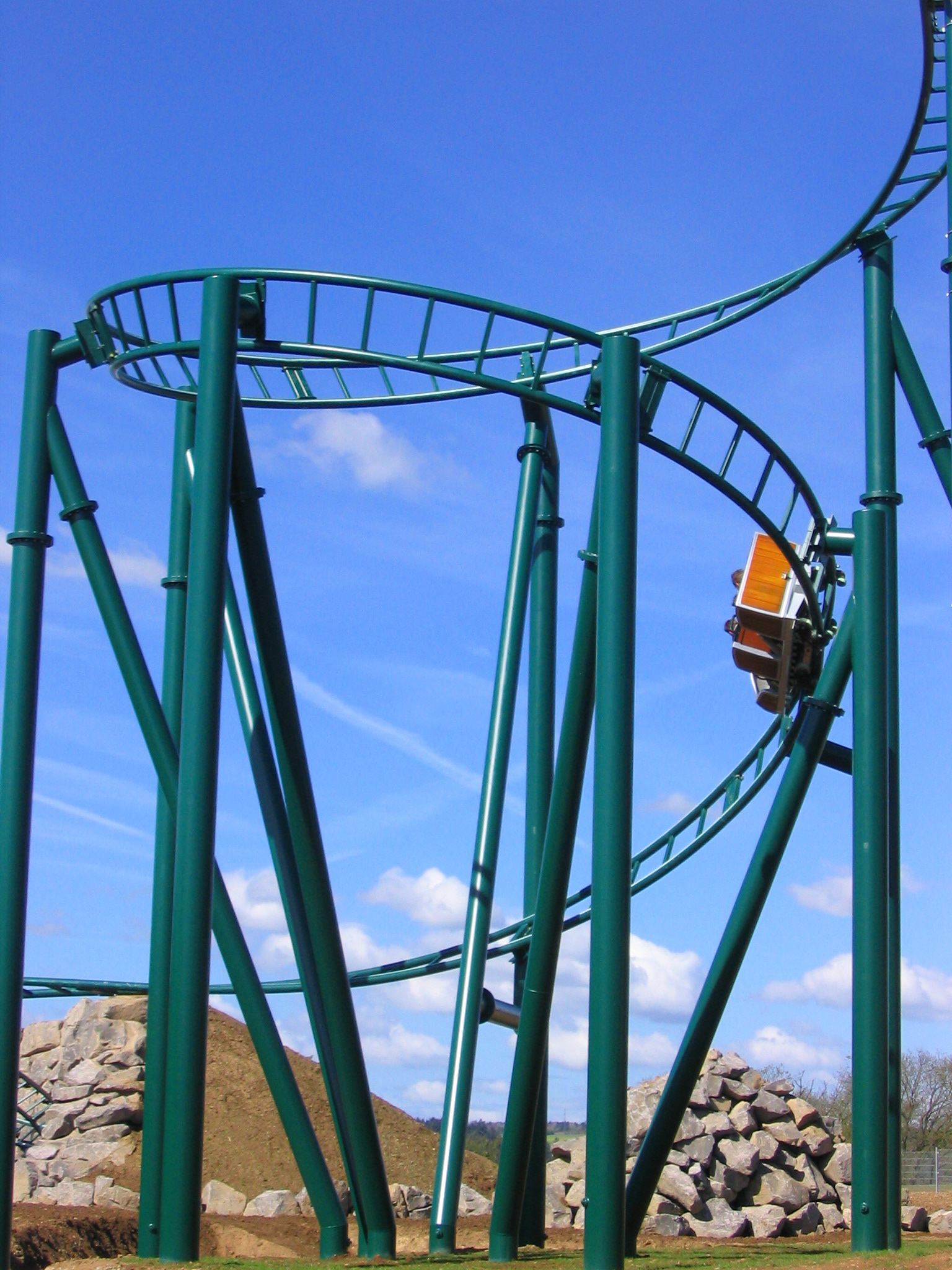
Bobsled roller coaster Heiße Fahrt at Wild- und Freizeitpark Klotten.

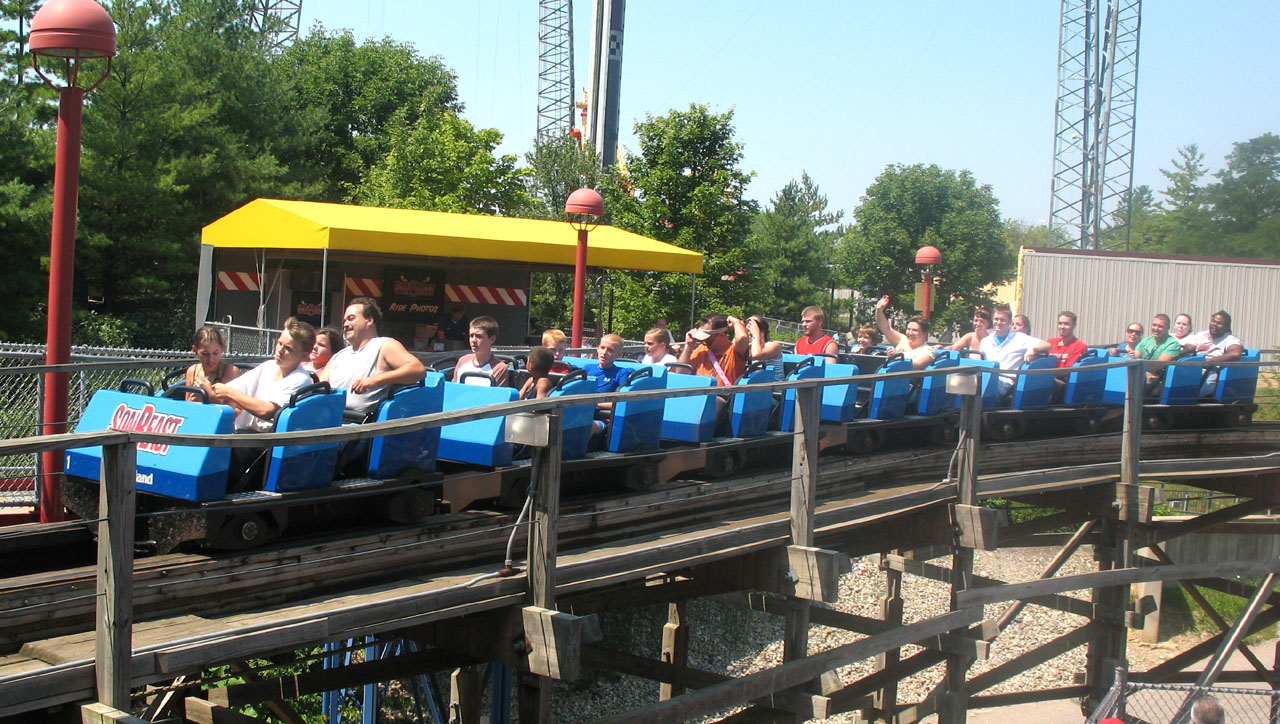
Gerstlauer-designed wooden roller coaster train on Son of Beast at Kings Island.

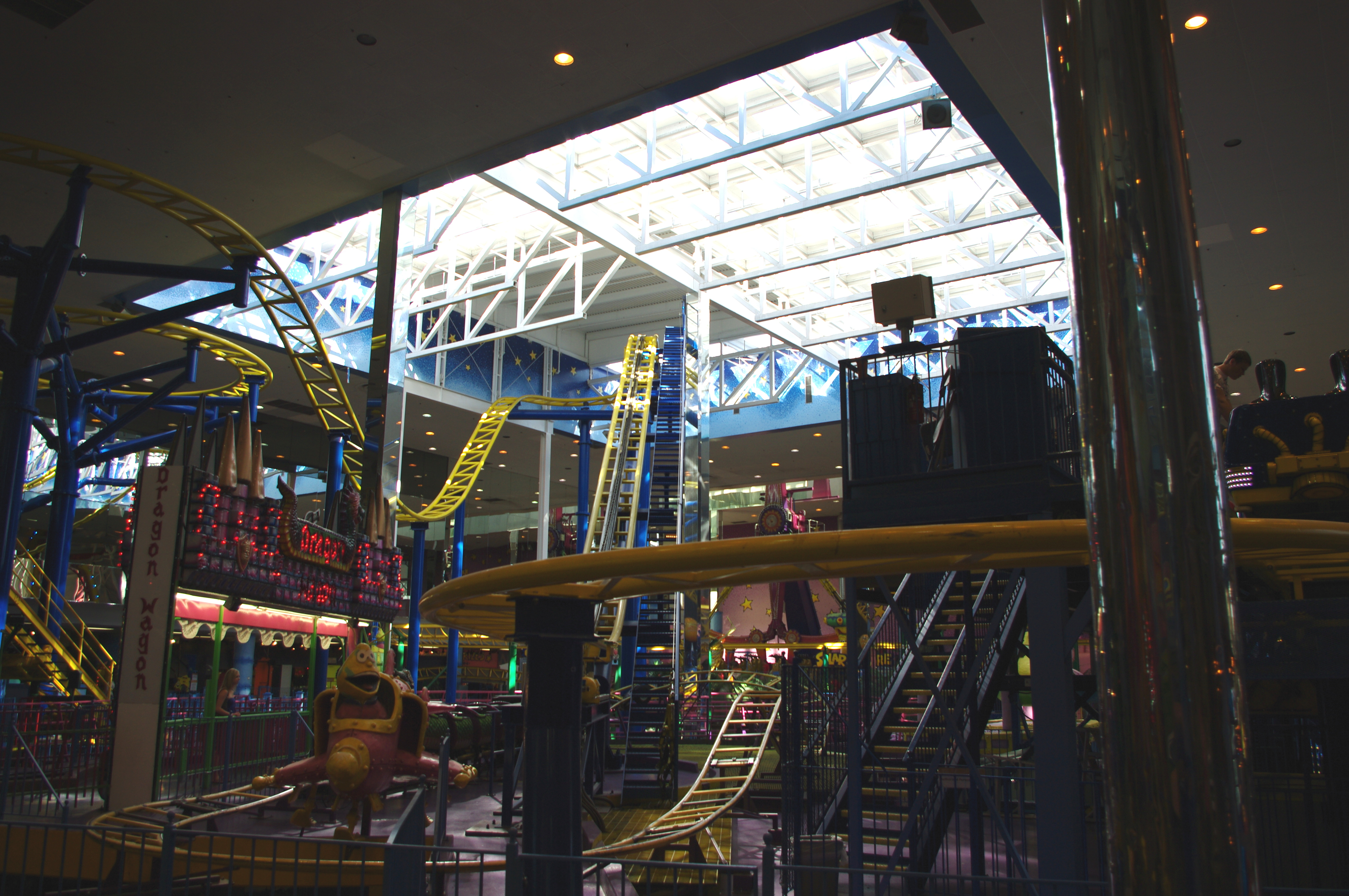
The Galaxy Orbiter spinning coaster at the Galaxyland Amusement Park inside West Edmonton Mall, Canada.

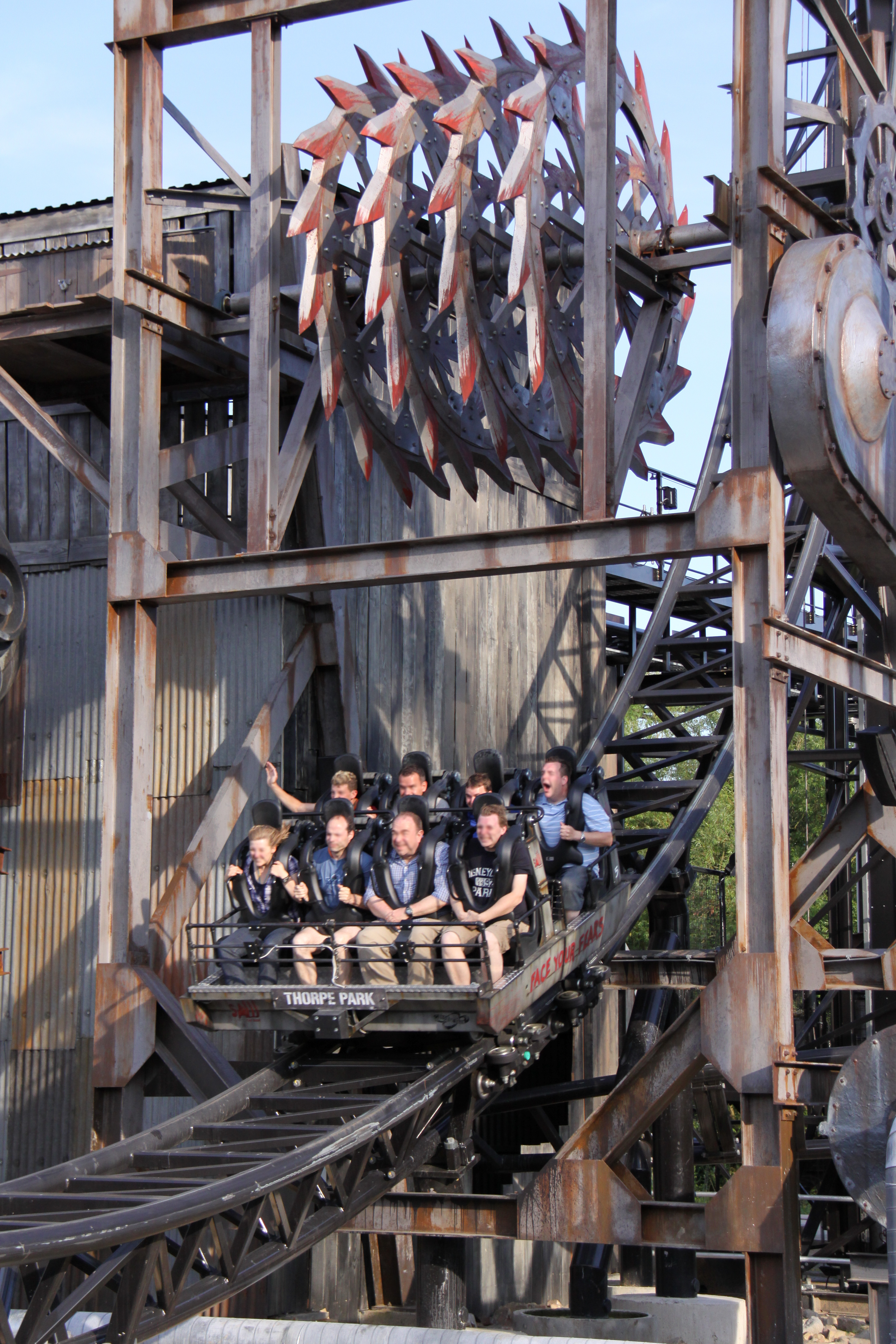
Saw – The Ride at Thorpe Park
