= Adrenaline Peak =

Steel roller coaster in Portland, Oregon

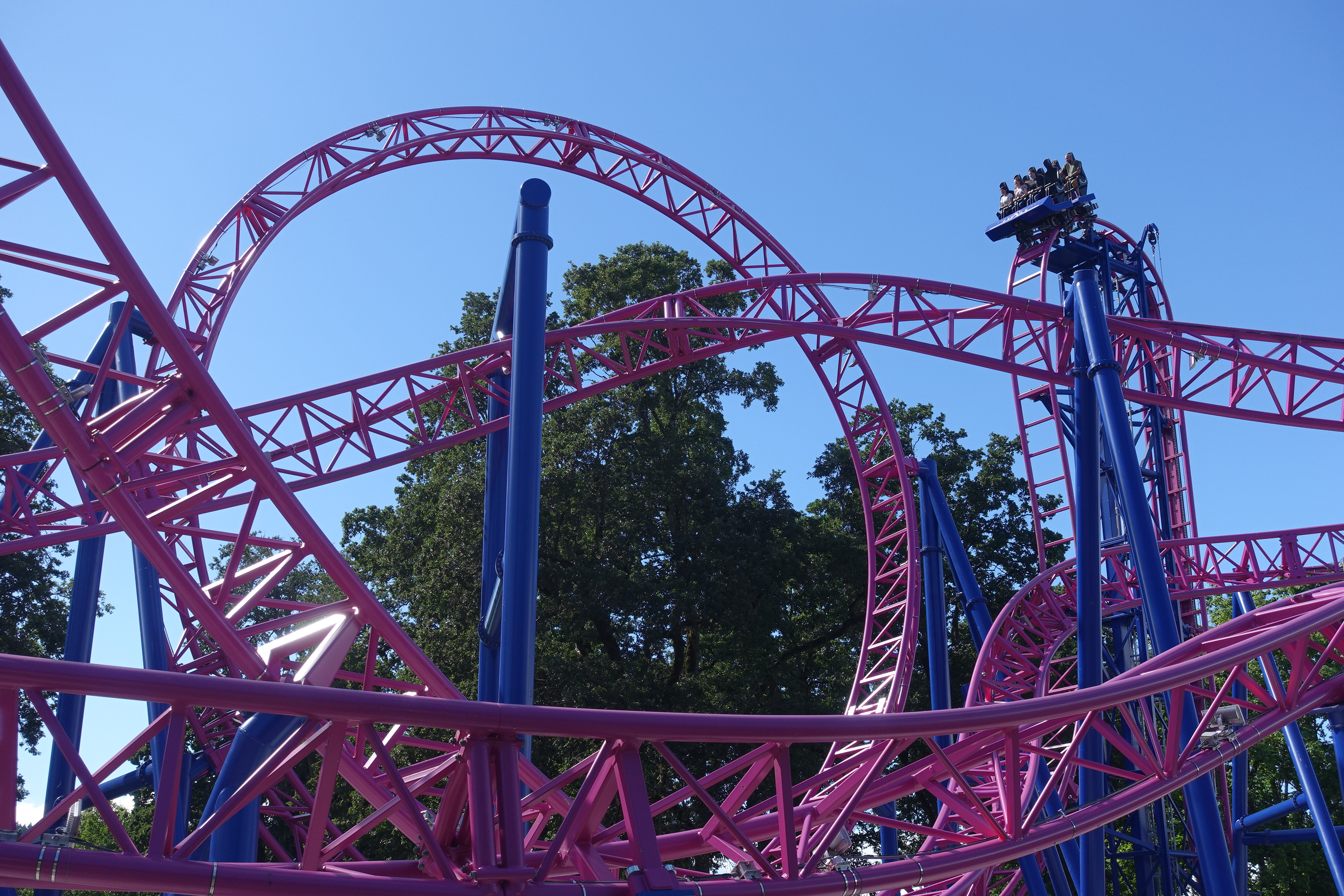

Oaks Amusement Park
- Location: Oaks Amusement Park
- Park section: South End
- Coordinates: 45.471589°N 122.662314°W
- Status: Operating
- Opening date: March 24, 2018
- Cost: $5,000,000
- Replaced: Looping Thunder

General statistics
- Type: Steel – Euro-Fighter
- Manufacturer: Gerstlauer
- Model: 320
- Lift/launch system: Chain lift hill
- Height: 72 ft (22 m)
- Drop: 70 ft (21 m)
- Length: 1,050 ft (320 m)
- Speed: 45 mph (72 km/h)
- Inversions: 3
- Max vertical angle: 97°
- Height restriction: 48 in (122 cm)
- Trains: 3 trains with a single car; riders arranged 4 across in 2 rows for a total of 8 riders per train
- Adrenaline Peak at RCDB

Adrenaline Peak is a steel roller coaster at Oaks Amusement Park, just south of Portland, Oregon. The ride replaced the Pinfari Looping Thunder coaster in the park's South End, which closed after the 2017 season. The coaster was manufactured by Gerstlauer and is one of their Euro-Fighter coasters, containing three inversions and a vertical lift hill.

== History ==
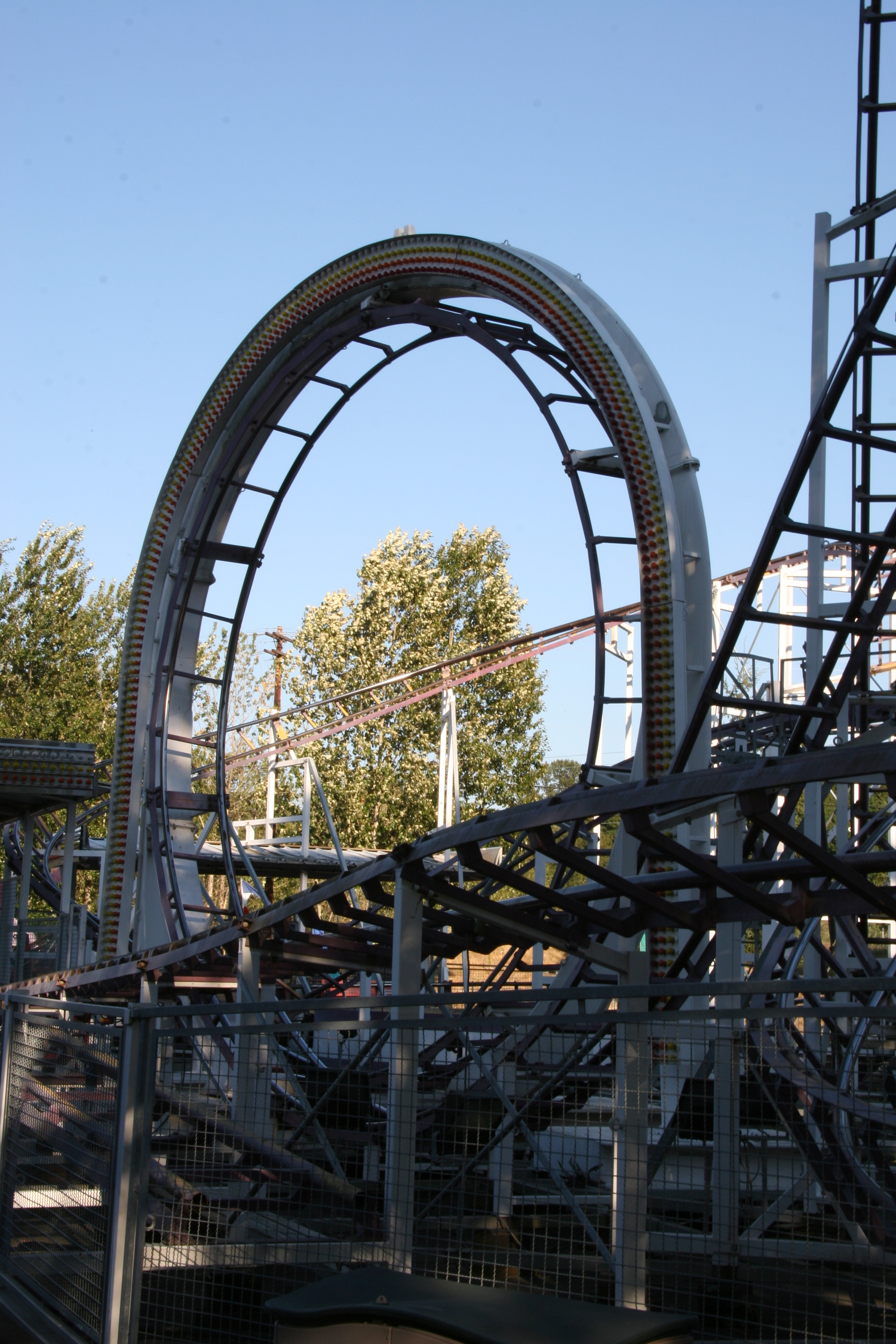
The former Looping Thunder roller coaster was replaced by Adrenaline Peak

On August 17, 2017, Oaks Amusement Park announced that they would open a brand new coaster for the 2018 season, revealing the ride layout and announcing a naming contest to determine the attraction's new name, with entries being accepted through to December 1, 2017. To make way for the unnamed new coaster, the Looping Thunder coaster was set to be removed, and offered its last rides on September 24, 2017. Looping Thunder was a common Zyklon looping coaster from former Italian manufacturer Pinfari, and had opened in 1996. The coaster was dismantled by Seattle-based firm WBF Construction Services in November.

Site preparation began in the winter of 2017/2018. WBF Construction Services was once again contracted to erect the coaster, in conjunction with Maryland-based Ride Entertainment Group, who currently handles all of coaster manufacturer Gerstlauer's operations in the Western Hemisphere. The Union Ironworkers construction crew completed ride construction in a record 11 days time, finishing on February 16, 2018, which would lead to the process being declared as a world record for the fastest construction timeline on a major coaster. On February 15, 2018, Oaks revealed that the new name of the coaster would be Adrenaline Peak. The name was submitted by William Phillips of Clackamas County, Oregon, who was rewarded with a $500 park gift card. Adrenaline Peak opened to the public on March 24, 2018.

== Ride experience ==
The coaster makes a left-hand 90° turn out of the loading platform and engages with the lift chain. The chain mechanism activates, and the coaster car climbs up the 72-foot (22 m) tall vertical lift hill. Upon cresting the top, the ride is released into a 97° drop and into a vertical loop—a homage to the old Looping Thunder coaster—and a cutback inversion. The cars rocket up into a high-profile turnaround, followed by a heartline roll. A final sweeping turnaround pops riders up into the brake run, and the coaster cars make a 90° left turn back onto the station platform. The relatively short ride experience lasts about a minute.

== Characteristics ==
=== Statistics ===
Adrenaline Peak is 72 feet (22 m) tall, 1,050 feet (320 m) long, and reaches an advertised top speed of 45 mph (72 km/h) on the ride's signature beyond-vertical drop (97°). The coaster is serviced by three trains, each of which seats eight riders in two rows of four. The trains restrain riders in with a simple lap bar. The coaster is able to reach a top advertised capacity of around 700 people per hour.

The coaster is located in the South End of the park, on the site of the former Looping Thunder roller coaster and much of the surrounding parking lot, and is outfitted with a vibrant blue-and-fuchsia color scheme. Adrenaline Peak's track is outfitted with an extensive lighting package from KCL Engineering, who had installed similar lighting systems on various other attractions, such as Monster at Adventureland in Altoona, Iowa and Hangtime at Knott's Berry Farm in Buena Park, California. The Monster and subsequent rides lighting system's originator and designer, Mike Lambert, was recognized with two Illuminating Engineering Society Illumination awards for innovation in design.

=== Model ===
Adrenaline Peak was designed and manufactured by German firm Gerstlauer, and is a member of their Eurofighter brand. This family of coasters is known for their iconic vertical lift hills and short 8-passenger cars, making it a popular choice for small parks since the first materialized as Typhoon at Bobbejaanland in Belgium for the 2004 season. Adrenaline Peak is of the 320m model and an exact clone of Hydrus at Casino Pier in Seaside Heights, New Jersey, which opened the year prior as a shortened version of the popular 320m+ layout.
