= Dare Devil Dive =

Roller coaster at Six Flags Over Georgia

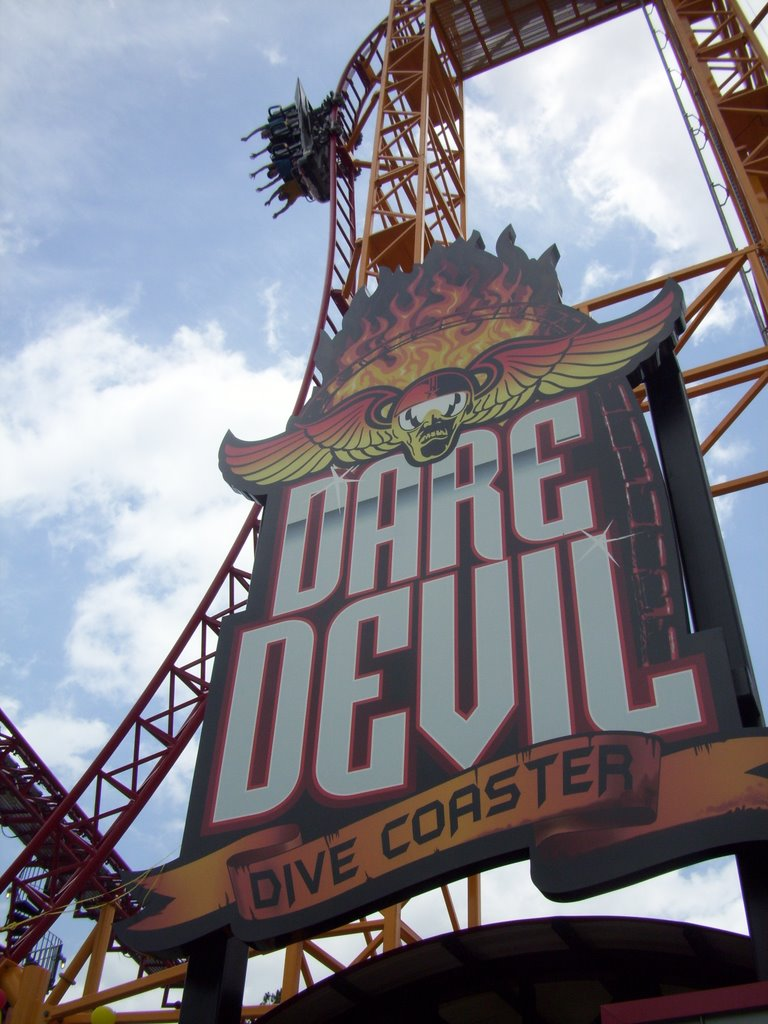
- The attraction's main sign and 95° first drop.

Six Flags Over Georgia
- Location: Six Flags Over Georgia
- Park section: USA Section
- Coordinates: 33.770261°N 84.547949°W
- Status: Operating
- Opening date: May 28, 2011
- Cost: $9,000,000

General statistics
- Type: Steel
- Manufacturer: Gerstlauer
- Model: Euro-Fighter (Custom)
- Lift/launch system: Vertical chain lift hill
- Height: 95 ft (29 m)
- Length: 2,099 ft (640 m)
- Speed: 52 mph (84 km/h)
- Inversions: 3
- Duration: 1:40
- Max vertical angle: 95°
- Height restriction: 48 in (122 cm)
- Trains: 4 trains with a single car; riders arranged 2 across in 3 rows for a total of 6 riders per train
- Fast Lane available
- Dare Devil Dive at RCDB

Dare Devil Dive is a steel roller coaster at Six Flags Over Georgia. Designed by German company Gerstlauer, Dare Devil Dive is based on the company's Euro-Fighter model, and features a 95-foot (29 m)-tall vertical lift hill, a 95° first drop, three inversions and a top speed of 52 miles per hour (84 km/h). It is also the first Euro-Fighter to debut a new lap-bar restraint system, replacing the more common over-the-shoulder harnesses.

== History ==
First announced on September 1, 2010, Dare Devil Dive was placed in the park's USA section, which also includes the Goliath roller coaster. The park demolished its long-standing Drive-in theater building in the spring of 2010 and removed its indoor Eli Bridge Scrambler "Shake Rattle and Roll" in the fall of that year. Also, the park's former Freefall attraction, a first-generation Intamin freefall tower, was located adjacent to the theater until it was removed after the 2006 season. The park added a construction blog to follow the construction of the roller coaster. In December 2010, Six Flags Over Georgia released a CGI video of Dare Devil Dive, showcasing the ride's layout and theming.

The ride officially opened to the public on May 28, 2011, with soft opening for Season Passholders held the day prior. It was the second Gerstlauer Euro-Fighter to open in the Southeastern United States, with the first one being Mystery Mine at Dollywood.

Six Flags announced on March 3, 2016, that Dare Devil Dive would be among several rides at various parks that would receive a virtual reality (VR) upgrade. Riders aged 13 and older will have the option to wear Samsung Gear VR headsets, powered by Oculus, to create a 360-degree, 3D experience while riding. The illusion is themed to a fighter jet, where riders fly through a futuristic city as co-pilots battling alien invaders. The feature debuted with the coaster when the park opened for the 2016 season on March 12, 2016. Children 12 or younger will not be able to wear the headsets, and will have to ride Dare Devil Dive normally.

The next season, the VR was removed.

=== Naming ===
This is the second attraction to carry the "Dare Devil Dive" name in Six Flags Over Georgia's history. In 1996, the park added a Skycoaster attraction to its Cotton States section that was named "Fearless Freep's Dare Devil Dive". That name was inspired by a Bugs Bunny cartoon, High Diving Hare, in which Yosemite Sam attempts to coerce Bugs Bunny into performing a high-diving act when the show's star, Fearless Freep, is unavailable. In recent years, the park has renamed the attraction simply as "Sky Coaster."

== Track layout ==
Like other Euro-Fighter models, Dare Devil Dive features a vertical lift hill, in this case 95 feet (29 m) in height. Upon reaching the top, the car drops at a "beyond-vertical" angle of 95°, with the track curling slightly back under the top of the lift before leveling out. Unlike the other models, Dare Devil Dive uses a newly designed lap-bar restraint system, making it the first in the world to deploy it. The 2,099 feet (640 m) of track includes three inversions.

Dare Devil Dive begins as the car leaves the station and turns right to reach the vertical lift hill. Upon reaching the top, the car slowly crests the hill then drops toward the ground, passing through "rings of fire" before leveling out and climbing to enter the first inversion, a dive loop. As it exits, it drops back to the ground before climbing upwards to the right to enter a banked turn on its side, then diving down towards the right. It next enters the second inversion, an Immelman, returning to the ground then turning upwards to the left to enter the ride's mid-course brakes.

Exiting the brakes, the train makes a U-turn to the left, swinging around a "control tower" then crossing over the first drop before making another U-turn to the right through a tunnel, exiting into the final inversion, a heartline roll. After a final right-hand turn, the car reaches the final brake run and returns to the station.

== See also ==
- 2011 in amusement parks
