= Defiance (roller coaster) =

Steel roller coaster in Colorado

Glenwood Caverns Adventure Park
- Location: Glenwood Caverns Adventure Park
- Coordinates: 39°33′36″N 107°19′16″W
- Status: Operating
- Soft opening date: July 1, 2022
- Opening date: July 9, 2022

General statistics
- Type: Steel
- Manufacturer: Gerstlauer
- Model: Eurofighter
- Lift/launch system: Chain lift hill
- Height: 75 ft (23 m)
- Drop: 110 ft (34 m)
- Speed: 56 mph (90 km/h)
- Inversions: 2
- Max vertical angle: 102.3°
- Trains: 2 trains with a single car. Riders are arranged 4 across in 2 rows for a total of 8 riders per train.
- Defiance at RCDB

Defiance is a steel roller coaster located at Glenwood Caverns Adventure Park in Glenwood Springs, Colorado. The coaster straddles the Iron Mountain and is located some 1,300 feet (400 m) above the town of Glenwood Springs, and approximately 7,132 feet (2,174 m) above sea level, making it the highest roller coaster in the United States.

== History ==
In April 2021, ride manufacturer Gerstlauer and US collaborator Ride Entertainment Group revealed their intention to construct a record breaking coaster for a client in the United States, sparking mass speculation. In an interview with industry magazine Amusement Today, Ride Entertainment CEO Ed Hiller said, "Working with Gerstlauer for over 25 years, I am always astounded by their creativity and ability to innovate no matter what the project is." Hiller proceeded to describe the project as having "[a] custom layout and challenging location", and that "[It] will certainly be one of the most formidable installations we have faced".

On August 5, 2021, Glenwood Caverns announced the addition of Defiance. The park held an official groundbreaking ceremony for the attraction on the morning of August 20, 2021.

The ride has been operating since July 1, 2022.
