= Escape of Novgorod =

Roller coaster in Schleswig-Holstein, Germany

- Previously known as Curse of Novgorod
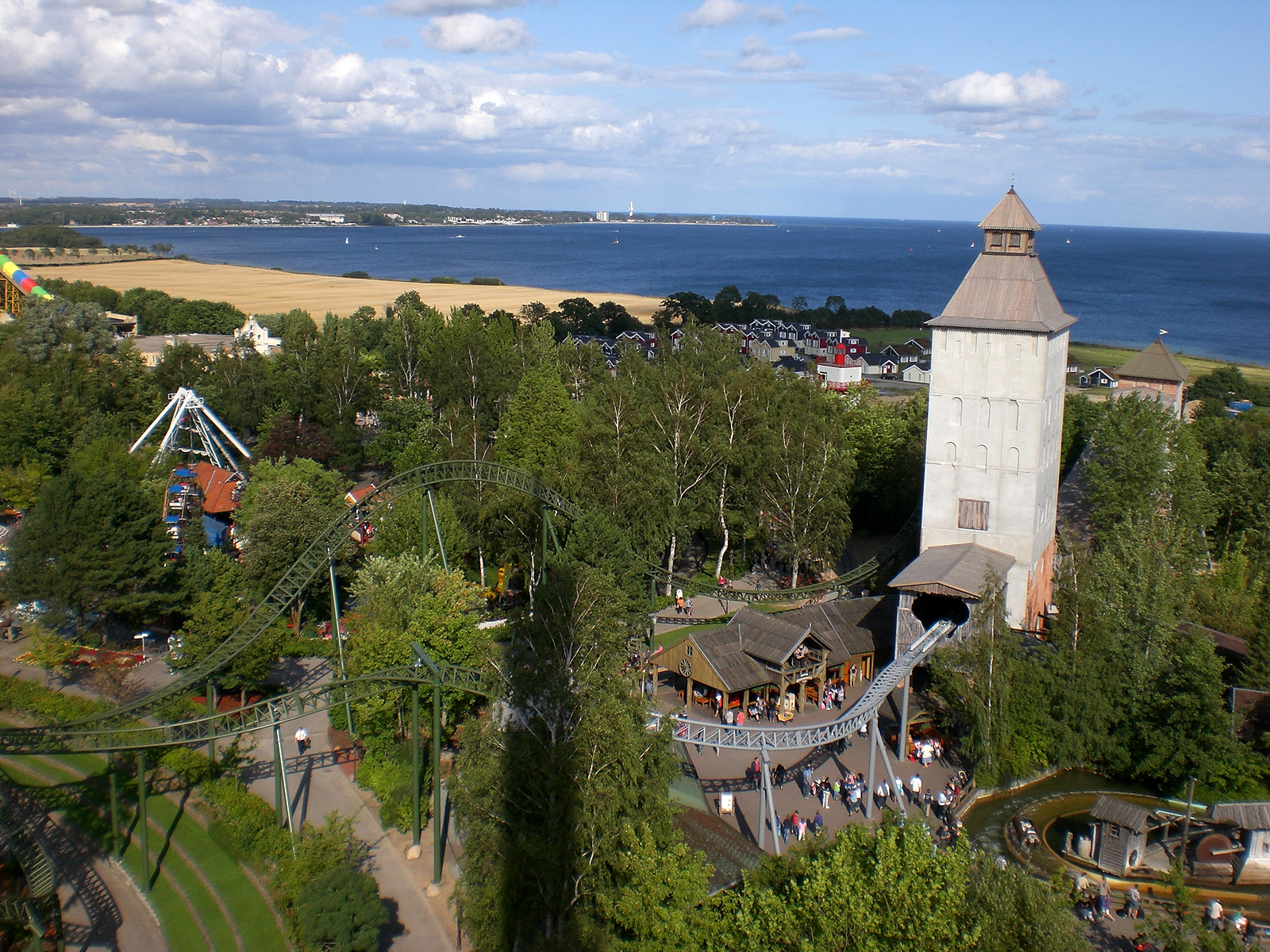

Hansa-Park
- Location: Hansa-Park
- Coordinates: 54.0744°N 10.7814°E
- Status: Operating
- Opening date: April 9, 2009

General statistics
- Type: Steel – Launched – Euro-Fighter
- Manufacturer: Gerstlauer
- Height: 40 m (130 ft)
- Length: 700 m (2,300 ft)
- Speed: 100 km/h (62 mph)
- Inversions: 1
- Capacity: 900 riders per hour
- G-force: 4.3 g
- Escape of Novgorod at RCDB

The Escape of Novgorod (German: Flucht von Novgorod), formerly Curse of Novgorod (German: Fluch von Novgorod), is a steel roller coaster at Hansa-Park, Schleswig-Holstein, Germany manufactured by Gerstlauer.

== Ride experience ==
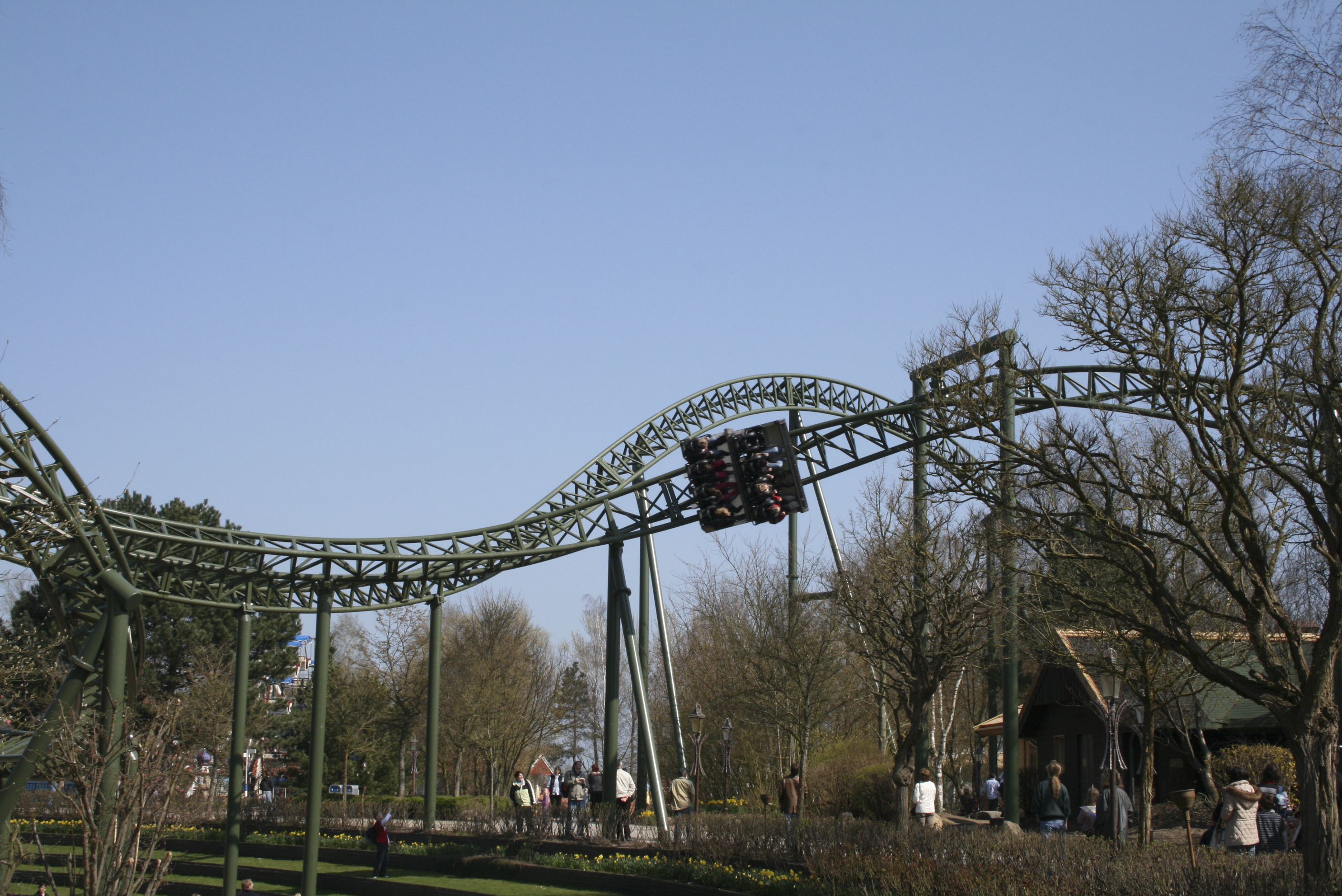
Train inside the heartline-roll

The train departs from the station, and travels through a small indoor dark ride section filled with special effects. The train then drops down a small dip which leads onto the launch track. The train is then accelerated to 100 km/h in 1.4 seconds, immediately into a hard banked turn to the right, curving upwards, and out of the building. The train passes a top-hat which provides a moment of airtime, before dropping back down. The train then travels through a large overbanked turn to the left and into a pretzel-turn. Following the pretzel-turn, the train travels through a heartline-roll and onto a brake run which slows the train to a halt before entering the show building once more. The train then climbs a 90 degree vertical lift hill with more special effects in complete darkness. The train crests the top of the lift hill and drops down a 97 degree, beyond vertical drop. The train then moves into a quick banked turn to the left, and onto a straight track (which is alongside the launch track), which has brakes to slow it down. The train then rises up a small hill, and onto the final brake run, which leads back into the station.

The 97° drop makes the ride the steepest dark ride rollercoaster in the world, and the steepest roller coaster in Germany. It is the first combination of a Euro-Fighter and a Launched roller coaster.

== Name and background story ==
The roller coaster is named after the Russian city of Veliky Novgorod. The train travels through a replica of the city's Kremlin while narrating the story of the disappeared Heinrich Oldendorp who traveled over the Lake Ilmen from Gotland to Veliky Novgorod, but never arrived at the city. His son Peer traveled to Russia in 1365 to meet mendicant Alexej Baitova. Alexei's father reported: it was Volkov. According to the story of Novgorod, Prince Rurik had Volkov hanged in front of the city gates between two scarecrows. But even 400 years later, it seems that the dark magician is still alive. Only the walls of the Kremlin under Rurik's ghost offer protection. Out of curiosity, they follow the wolf's seal and meet Volkov. He leads Peer Oldendorp out into the woods through a fire. There his father appears to him and he learns that Volkov is still up to mischief as a waterwolf.
