= Duinrell =

Amusement park in Wassenaar, Netherlands

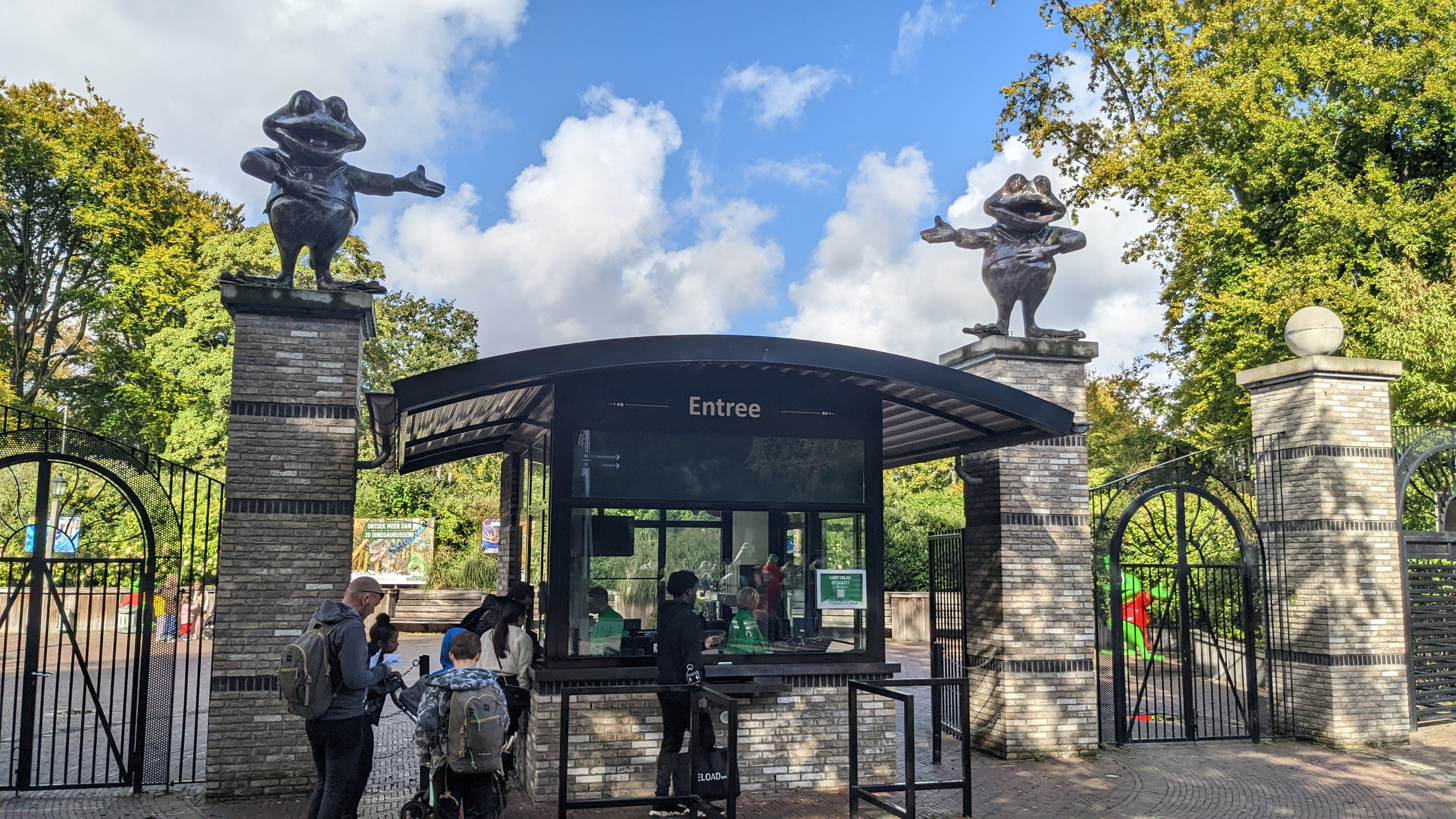
- Entrance to Duinrell
- Interactive map of Duinrell
- Location: Wassenaar, Netherlands
- Coordinates: 52°08′48″N 4°22′52″E
- Status: Operating
- Opened: 1935
- Owner: Van Zuylen van Nijevelt family
- Slogan: Duinrell, daar kikker je van op.
- Operating season: 16 April to 30 October

Attractions
- Total: Over 40 (as of 2023)
- Roller coasters: 3
- Water rides: 4
- Website: https://www.duinrell.com/

Duinrell is an amusement park situated in the town of Wassenaar, Netherlands on the estate of the counts Van Zuylen van Nijevelt. In addition to the main amusement park sporting about 40 different attractions, Duinrell has been critically acclaimed for its water park with swimming pool (the Tikibad), which boasts 21 waterslides and a kids' water park. The grounds also include campsites, lodges, and some sporting facilities.

The park has a mascot named Rick the Frog.

== History ==
The Duinrell farm in Wassenaar dates as far back as 1646 as part of a large estate. In 1876, Duinrell opened a small port taking in cargo and goods. In 1935 the estate opened to the public with a restaurant and orangery, eventually adding campgrounds, a swimming pool, and developing into a recreational estate.

On March 31, 2012, Duinrell opened Dragonfly, a Family Coaster 360 model manufactured by Gerstlauer. The 16-metre-tall (52 ft), 360-metre-long (1,180 ft) ride was designed to appeal to a broad age demographic.

As of 2022, the park is visited by over a million people each year.
