= Vild-Svinet =

Roller coaster at BonBon-Land, Denmark

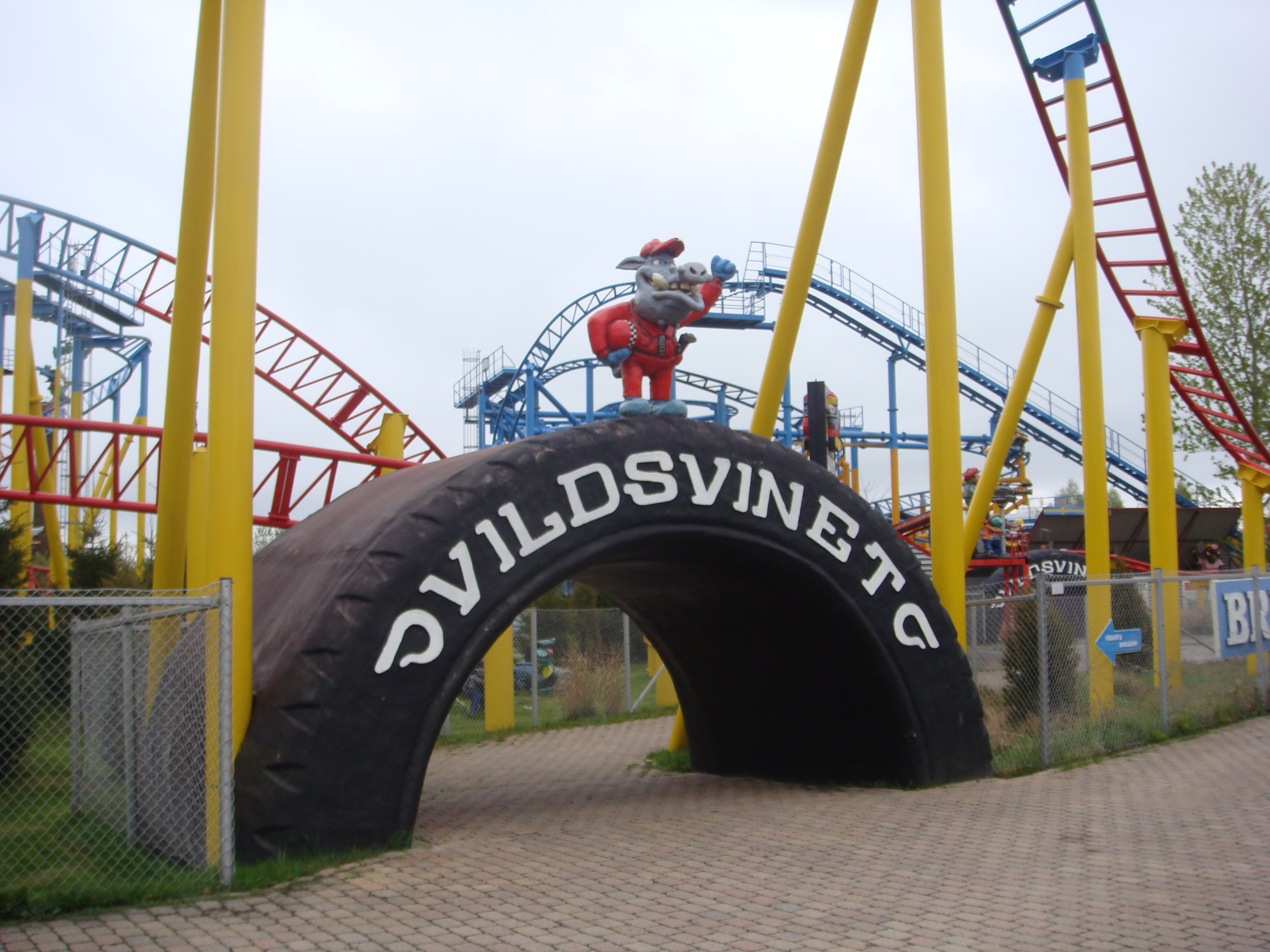
- Entrance to Vild-Svinet

BonBon-Land
- Location: BonBon-Land
- Coordinates: 55.2611°N 11.8634°E
- Status: Operating
- Opening date: 16 May 2003

General statistics
- Type: Steel – Euro-Fighter
- Manufacturer: Gerstlauer
- Designer: Werner Stengel
- Height: 22 m (72 ft)
- Length: 428 m (1,404 ft)
- Speed: 72.4 km/h (45.0 mph)
- Inversions: 1
- Duration: 1:00
- Max vertical angle: 97°
- Height restriction: 140 cm (4 ft 7 in)
- Trains: 4 trains with a single car. Riders are arranged 4 across in 2 rows for a total of 8 riders per train.
- Vild-Svinet at RCDB

Vild-Svinet (Danish for The Wild Boar) is a steel roller coaster at BonBon-Land in southern Zealand, Denmark, approximately 100 kilometres (62 mi) from Copenhagen. Vild-Svinet is the prototype for the Gerstlauer Euro-Fighter roller coaster model. At 97 degrees, the coaster is the steepest roller coaster in Denmark.

== History and design ==
Opening on 16 May 2003, Vild-Svinet was the first ever Euro-Fighter model coaster to be built. When it opened, Vild-Svinet was the steepest roller coaster in the world (other Euro-Fighters would later tie its record) until its record was surpassed by Steel Hawg at Indiana Beach. Vild-Svinet was also the first roller coaster in the world to have an initial drop steeper than 90 degrees. The coaster has one inversion, a single vertical loop. There are also overbanked turns in the coaster's course. As with other Euro-Fighters, guests ride the coaster in single-car trains. Riders on Vild-Svinet are arranged in two rows of four. Vild-Svinet has generally been the most popular coaster at BonBon-Land since its opening.

== Awards and reception ==
BonBon-Land and Gerstlauer were awarded the "FKF-Award 2003" by Freundeskreis Kirmes und Freizeitparks e.V. (Friends of Fairground and Amusement Association) for the construction of Vild-Svinet. The coaster was also ranked as the 3rd most innovative coaster of 2003 by COASTER-net. Frommer's included the coaster in their book, Frommer's 500 Adrenaline Adventures. Each award cited the coaster's steeper than vertical drop as being one of the primary justifications for Vild-Svinet's inclusion. Lonely Planet describes the coaster as "bonkers-looking" and notes that it is the most extreme amusement ride at BonBon-Land.
