= Tivoli Friheden =

Amusement park located in Aarhus, Denmark

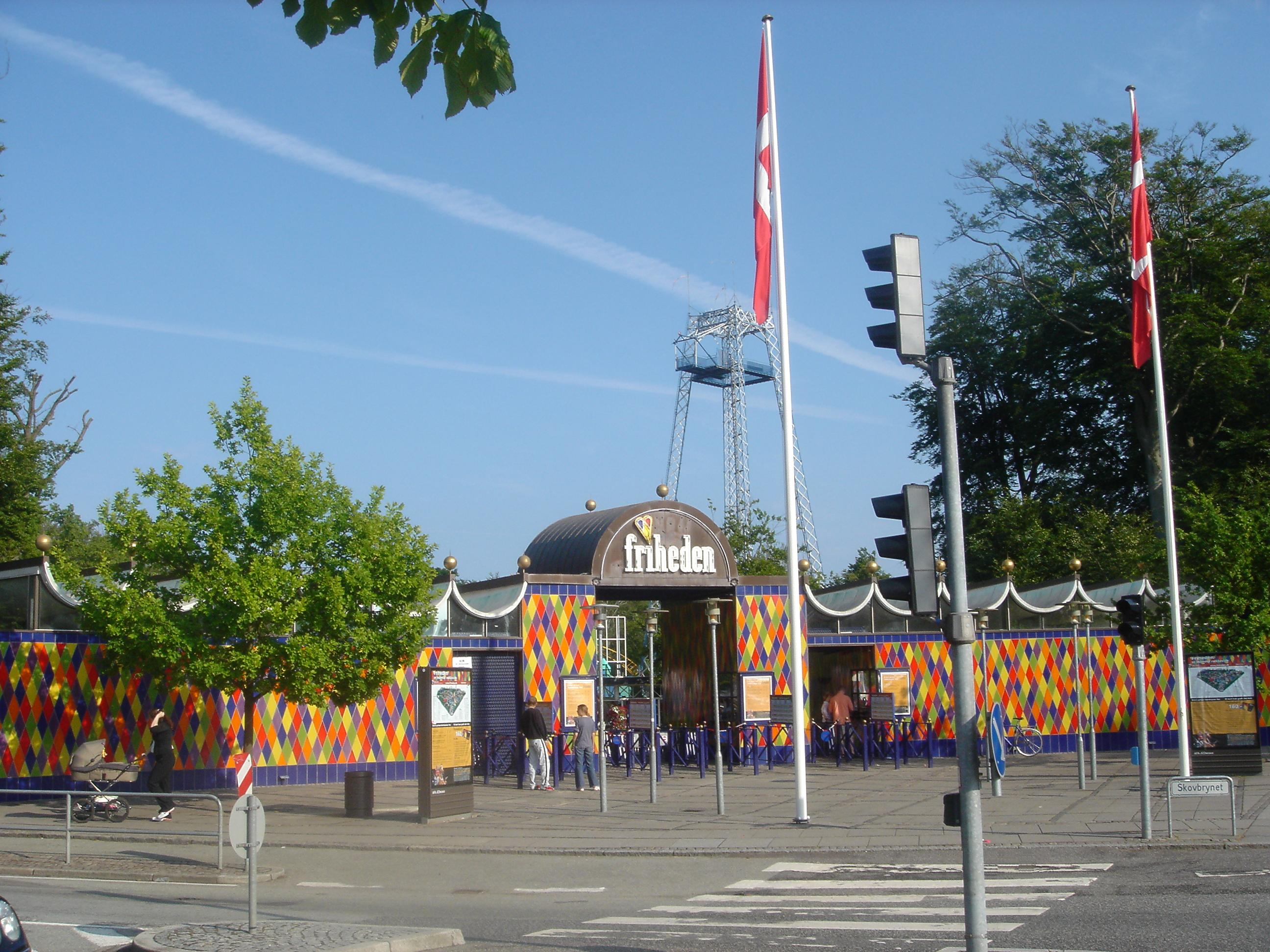
- Main entrance to Tivoli Friheden
- Interactive map of Tivoli Friheden
- Location: Aarhus, Denmark
- Coordinates: 56°8′13.76″N 10°11′45.05″E
- Opened: 1903
- Owner: Tivoli Friheden A/S
- Operating season: April - October

Attractions
- Total: 27
- Roller coasters: 4
- Water rides: 1
- Website: Friheden.dk

Tivoli Friheden is an amusement park located in Aarhus, Denmark. The park was visited by more than 695,000 visitors in 2024. The park is situated about 2 km to the south of the city centre. It has several themed sections with different types of attractions. There are more than 40 attractions.

The water section (Tivoli VanDvittig) covers an area of 5,000 m^{2}.

== History ==
In 1903 the citizens of Aarhus went on Sunday picnics to the woods where the forester served beer, coffee and cakes. The forester was so engaged with the restaurant that the city council was concerned that he was more of a restaurateur than a forester. As a result, the council gave one of the city's restaurants permission to serve the visitors in the woods.

On July 31, 1904, Hans Rising received permission from the town council to build a pavilion and two months later the Restaurant Terrassen was ready. The pavilion was designed by architect S. F. Kühnel, who also designed the residential Mejlborg in Mejlgade. The restaurant became popular in short time. Since 1909 concerts took place in every Sunday. Some contemporary artists like Lauritz Melchior or Gerda Christophersen made shows. In 1927 Hans Rising erected the large hall. It was later turned into a theatre.

After the World war I swings and children's slides are installed, the restaurant became a place of meeting for several festivals folk music.

In 1949, the park opened mini-golf. In 1950 pedal boats and a large chess game in front of the restaurant were introduced.

In 1954, after 50 working years, Hans Rising left the restaurant and the city council engaged the restaurateur Dan Christophersen, who was also compositor and manager of cabaret. There had been many different owners of Tivoli Friheden. In 1958 the municipality Århus and the owner signed a partnership.

On May 2, 1958, the enclosed amusement park was opened with a resounding success of over 400,000 visitors.

In 1984, the local authority fully took over the operation.

=== Cobra incident ===
On July 14, 2022, a 14-year-old girl was killed and a 13-year-old boy was injured on the rollercoaster "Cobra". According to the park, the rear car broke off from the rest of the train and was left suspended from the ride, leaving several other people trapped. This incident has caused the park to close for 2 days, and the rollercoaster involved to be permanently closed. In September 2024, the investigation ended, concluding that no person or company neglected their duties or could have known of the risk of failure, thus ending without prosecution. The ride was later torn down.
