= Typhoon (Bobbejaanland) =

Amusement ride

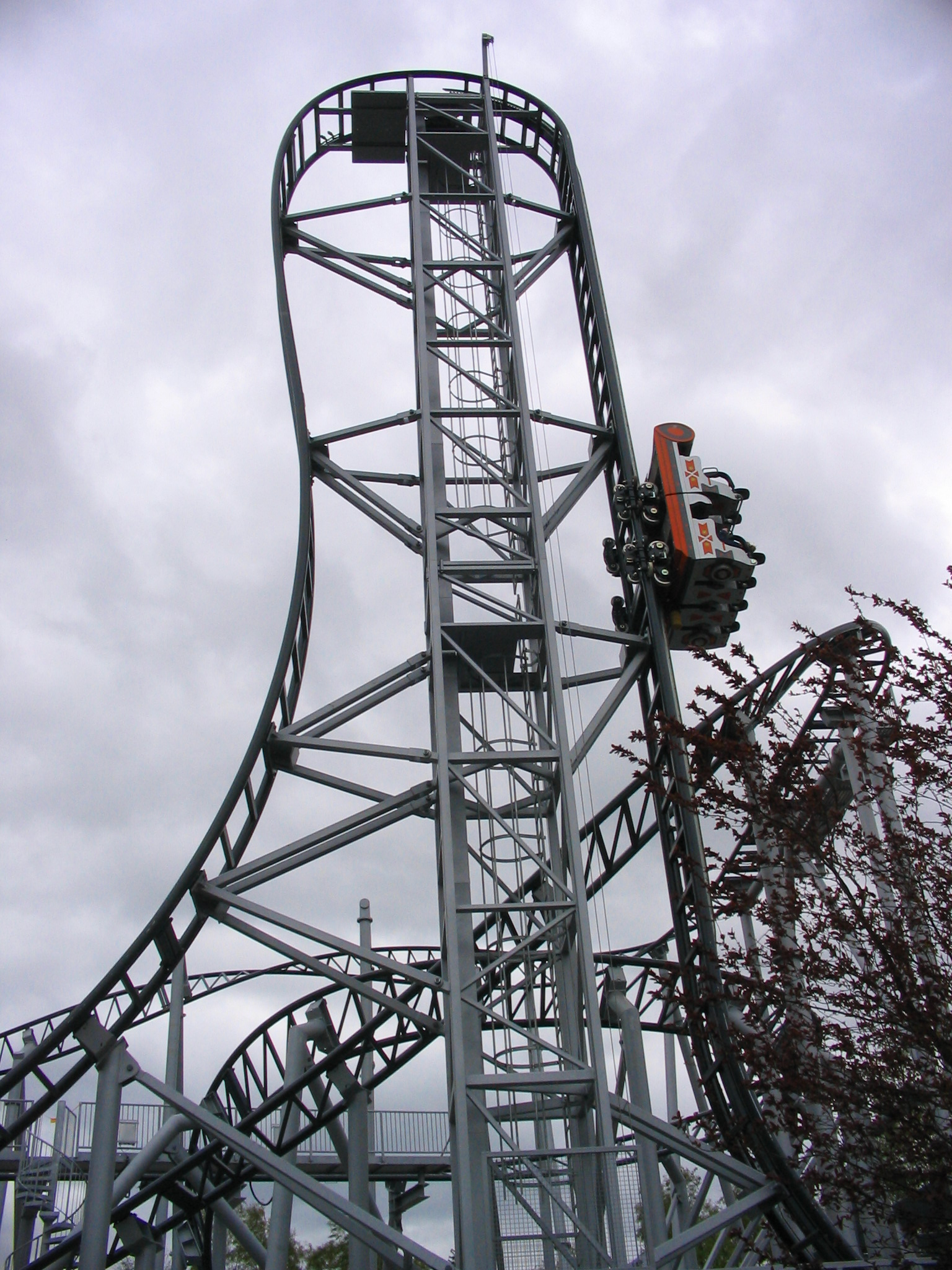
- Lift hill of Typhoon

Bobbejaanland
- Location: Bobbejaanland
- Park section: Land of Legends
- Coordinates: 51.199748°N 4.905519°E
- Status: Operating
- Opening date: 10 April 2004
- Cost: €5,000,000

General statistics
- Type: Steel – Euro-Fighter
- Manufacturer: Gerstlauer
- Designer: Werner Stengel
- Lift/launch system: Vertical chain lift hill
- Height: 25.7 m (84 ft)
- Length: 670 m (2,200 ft)
- Speed: 80 km/h (50 mph)
- Inversions: 4
- Duration: 1:30
- Max vertical angle: 97°
- Capacity: 1400 riders per hour
- G-force: 5
- Speedy Pass available
- Single rider line available
- Typhoon at RCDB

Typhoon is a steel roller coaster at the Bobbejaanland amusement park in Lichtaart, Belgium. Typhoon is a Gerstlauer Euro-Fighter model roller coaster, and the second installation of this model line. At 97 degrees, the coaster's first drop is steeper-than-vertical and it has the steepest drop of any roller coaster in Belgium.

== History ==
Constructed by the German roller coaster manufacturer Gerstlauer, Typhoon opened on 10 April 2004 and was built to replace the Looping Star roller coaster at Bobbejaanland. Typhoon was the most popular roller coaster in the park as of 2010.

To improve the ride's capacity, Bobbejaanland added a single rider-queue at the start of the 2025 season. It is located to the right of the Speedy Pass queue.

== Layout and ride experience ==
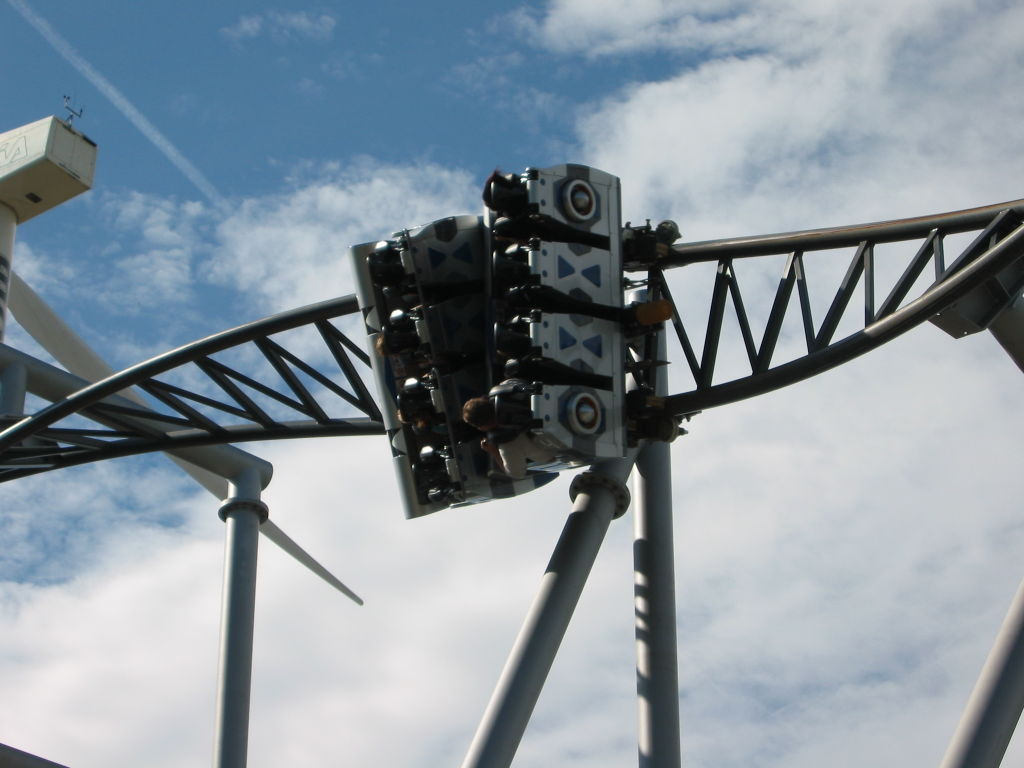
Heartline roll on Typhoon

Typhoon is a relatively compact roller coaster with a base of 75 metres (246 ft) by 29 metres (95 ft) with a maximum height of almost 26 metres (85 ft), which has been cited as being particularly small for a roller coaster with the number of inversions that Typhoon has. The Typhoon has four inversions: a vertical loop, double heartline roll and an additional single heartline roll. Typhoon has single cars which can each carry eight passengers (two rows of four people).

== Incidents ==
There have been a number of publicized incidents involving riders becoming stuck on Typhoon. One incident occurred in May 2011 when four children and two teenagers were stuck on the coaster. The riders were eventually rescued and none were injured in the incident. In June 2013, eight riders were evacuated after another incident and were forced to use an emergency staircase to exit. Additional incidents occurred in both June and July 2014. In the June 2014 incident, the coaster was stuck on the top of the lift hill and riders were forced to evacuate using the emergency stair. In the July 2014 incident, the coaster was stuck near the end of the ride. Neither case resulted in any injuries.
