= Infinity Coaster =

Roller coaster model by Gerstlauer

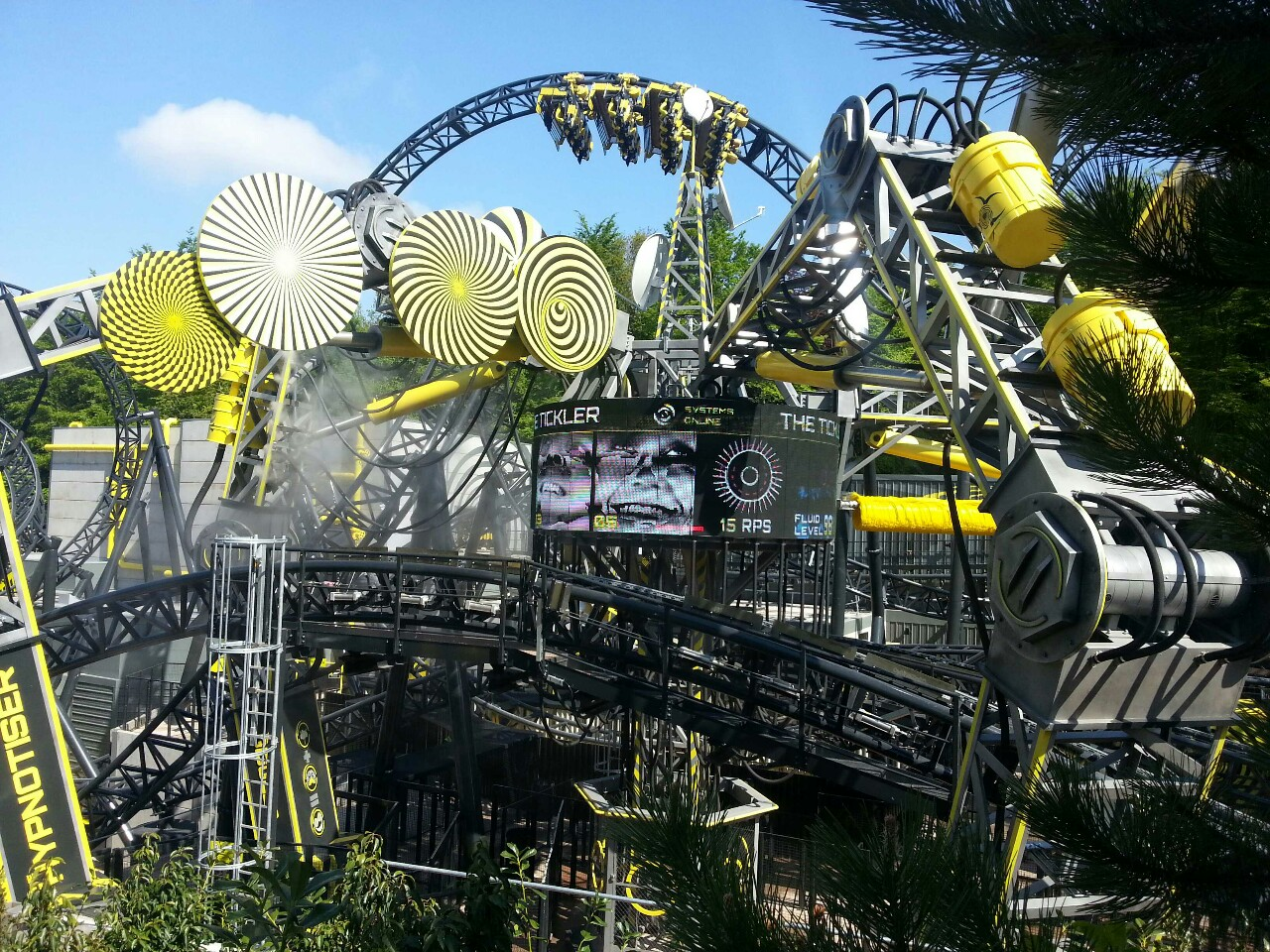
A16-seat train navigates a dive loop element on The Smiler

The Infinity Coaster is a roller coaster model by German amusement ride manufacturer Gerstlauer. A variant of their Euro-Fighter model, the Infinity Coaster allows for higher rider throughput through longer trains. The coaster also features a magnetic rollback system on rides with lift hills, to allow for easier evacuation of riders in breakdown situations. The ride car can roll backwards with the magnetic fins deployed and the lift motor in reverse.

The first Infinity Coaster was The Smiler at Alton Towers in the United Kingdom, which opened in 2013.

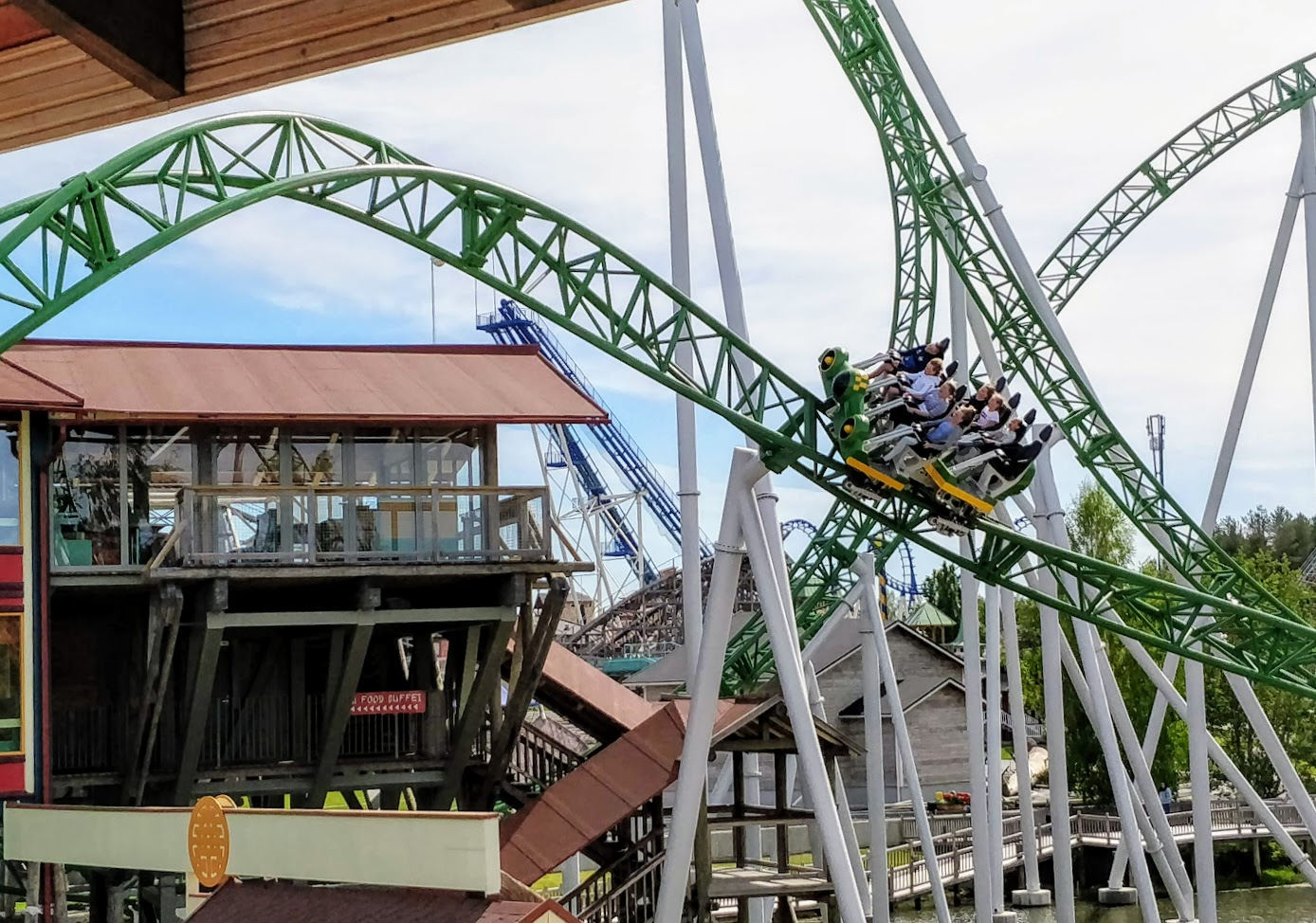
Junker at PowerPark was the third Infinity Coaster installation

== Installations ==
Name	Model	Park	Country	Opened	Status	Ref(s)
The Smiler	Model 1170	Alton Towers	United Kingdom	May 31, 2013	Operating	
Karacho	Launched 700	Erlebnispark Tripsdrill	Germany	July 10, 2013	Operating	
Junker	Custom	PowerPark	Finland	May 30, 2015	Operating	
Der Schwur des Kärnan	Custom	Hansa-Park	Germany	July 1, 2015	Operating	
The Monster	Custom	Adventureland	United States	June 4, 2016	Operating	
Madagascar Mad Pursuit	Custom	Motiongate Dubai	United Arab Emirates	2017	Operating	
Gold Rush	Custom	Attractiepark Slagharen	Netherlands	April 13, 2017	Operating	
HangTime	Custom	Knott's Berry Farm	United States	May 18, 2018	Operating	
Mystic	Custom	Walibi Rhône-Alpes	France	May 30, 2019	Operating	
Fury	Custom	Bobbejaanland	Belgium	June 24, 2019	Operating	
Pitts Special	Custom	PowerPark	Finland	June 24, 2020	Operating	
