= Pitts Special (roller coaster) =

Roller coaster in Alahärmä, Finland

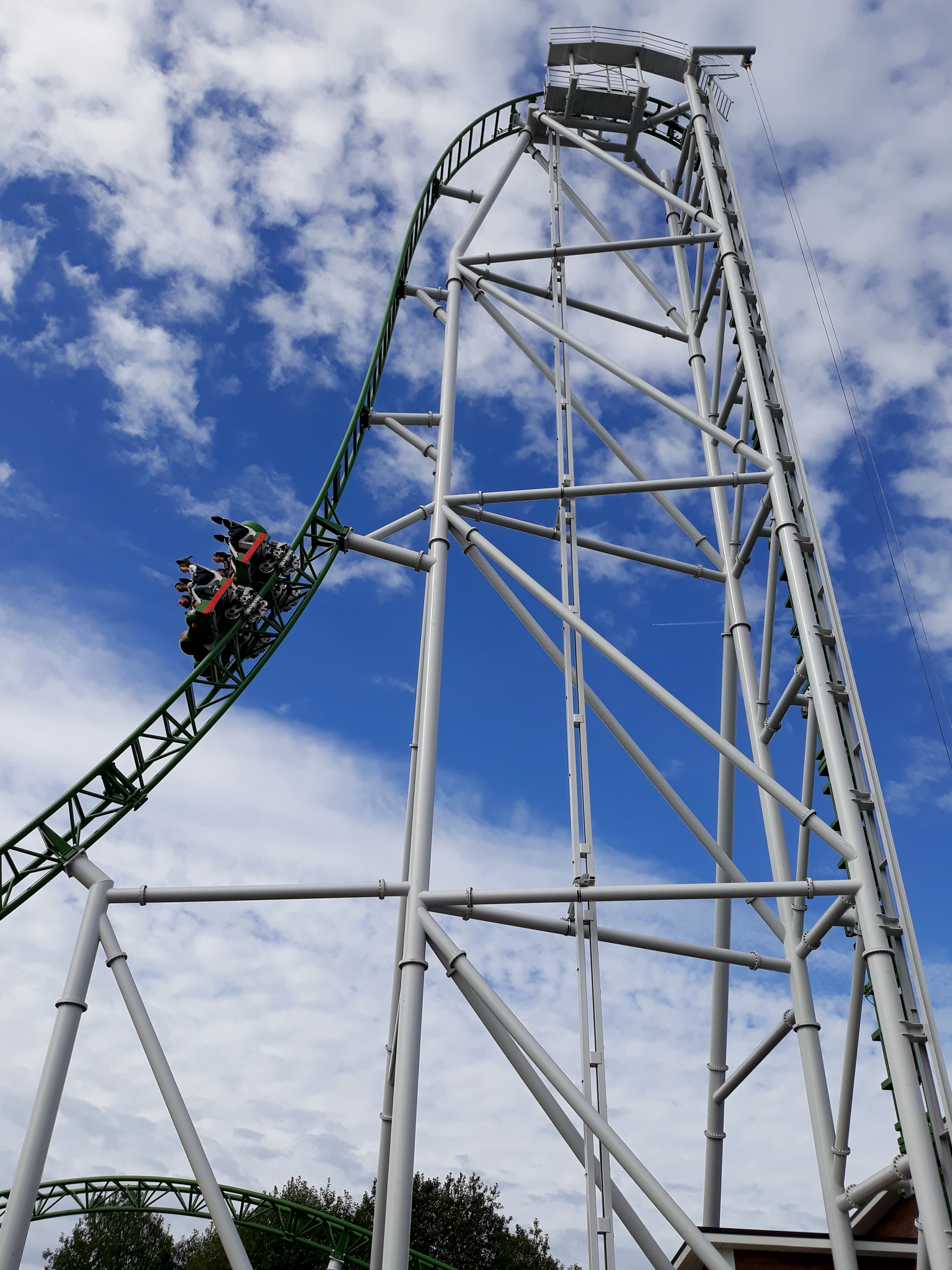

PowerPark
- Location: PowerPark
- Coordinates: 63.2307°N 22.8545°E
- Status: Operating
- Opening date: June 24, 2020

General statistics
- Type: Steel
- Manufacturer: Gerstlauer
- Model: Infinity Coaster
- Lift/launch system: Vertical chain lift hill
- Height: 43.5 m (143 ft)
- Length: 693 m (2,274 ft)
- Speed: 100 km/h (62 mph)
- Max vertical angle: 85°
- G-force: 4.5
- Height restriction: 130 cm (4 ft 3 in)
- Trains: Single train with 2 cars. Riders are arranged 4 across in a single row for a total of 8 riders per train.
- Pitts Special at RCDB

Pitts Special is a roller coaster made by Gerstlauer for the PowerPark amusement park in Alahärmä, Finland. The ride opened during the summer of 2020. The ride has a vertical 43-meter-high lifting hill right at the beginning, after which the train accelerates immediately to its top speed of 100 kilometers per hour.
