= American Thunder (roller coaster) =

Wooden roller coaster

- Previously known as Evel Knievel (2008-2010)
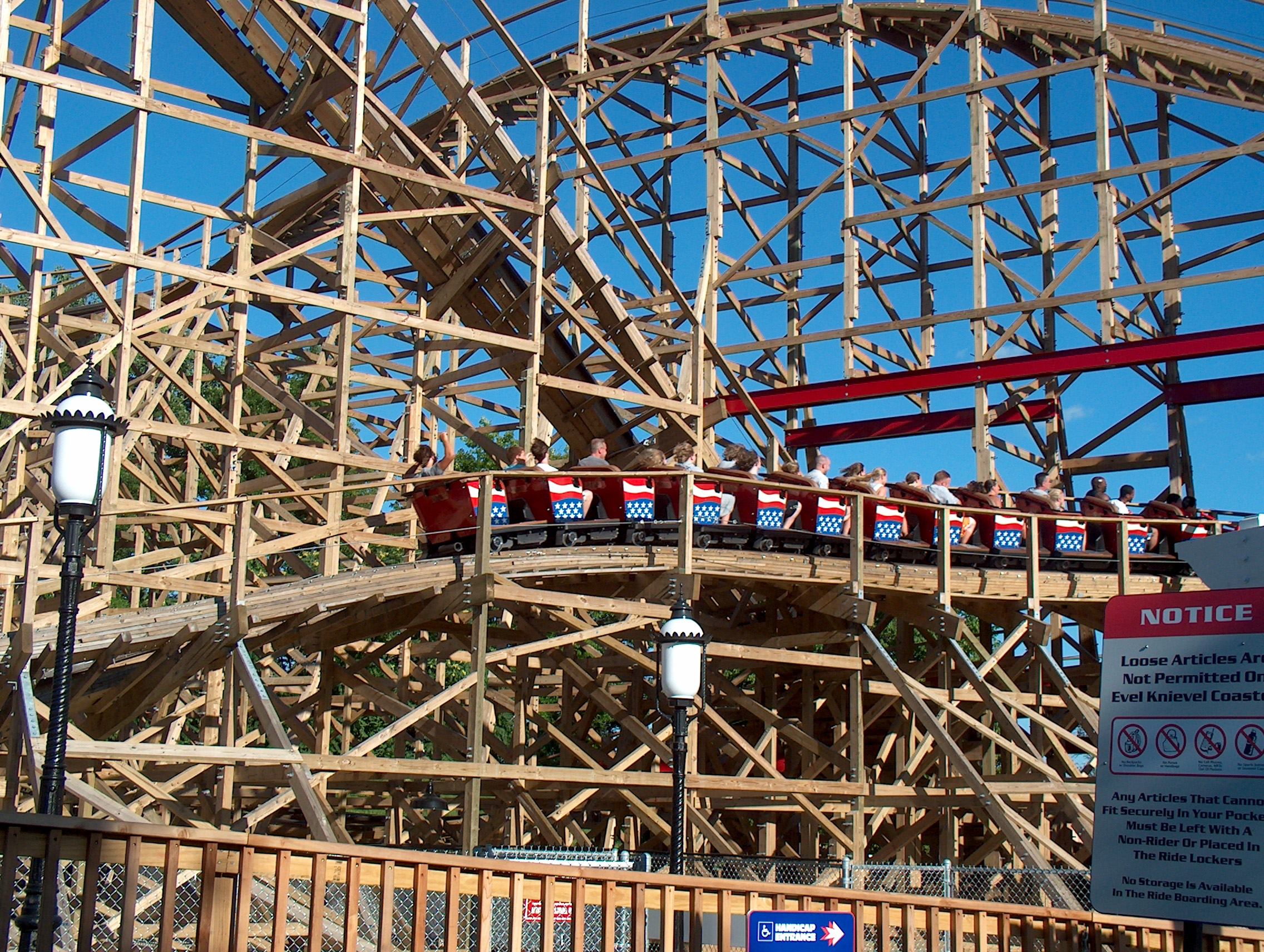
- The then-Evel Knievel Coaster in 2008

Mid America Adventure
- Location: Mid America Adventure
- Park section: 1904 World's Fair
- Coordinates: 38°30′45″N 90°40′38″W
- Status: Operating
- Opening date: June 20, 2008
- Cost: US$7,000,000

General statistics
- Type: Wood
- Manufacturer: Great Coasters International
- Lift/launch system: Chain lift hill
- Height: 82 ft (25 m)
- Drop: 80 ft (24 m)
- Length: 2,713 ft (827 m)
- Speed: 48 mph (77 km/h)
- Inversions: 0
- Capacity: 850 riders per hour
- Height restriction: 48 in (122 cm)
- Trains: 2 trains with 12 cars; riders arranged 2 across in a single row for a total of 24 riders per train
- Fast Lane available
- American Thunder at RCDB

American Thunder is a wooden roller coaster located in the 1904 World's Fair section of Mid America Adventure in Eureka, Missouri. Opened on June 20, 2008, the coaster was originally named after and themed to the famous motorcycle daredevil Evel Knievel. It was renamed American Thunder for the 2011 season. To help promote the opening of the then-Evel Knievel Roller Coaster, Knievel's son, Robbie Knievel, jumped a Honda CR-500 motorcycle over 25 Dodge Chargers on July 3, 2008.

As a result of the St. Louis Cardinals losing to the Chicago Cubs in the 2015 National League Division Series, then-Six Flags St. Louis lost a friendly wager with Six Flags Great America, resulting in the temporary name change of the roller coaster to Cubs Thunder.

== Ride experience ==
This $7 million GCI wooden roller coaster, which is identical to the Thunderbird at PowerPark, features an 80-foot (24 m) drop with a top speed of 48 mph (77 km/h), going through a course of 2,700 feet (820 m) of track. This ride features 16 hills and multiple high banked turns at up to 67° angles. The layout crosses over and under itself seventeen times. This ride also features two 24-passenger Millennium Flyer trains for better cornering.

== Awards ==
Golden Ticket Awards: Top wood Roller Coasters
Year									1998	1999
Ranking									–	–
Year	2000	2001	2002	2003	2004	2005	2006	2007	2008	2009
Ranking	–	–	–	–	–	–	–	–	44	13
Year	2010	2011	2012	2013	2014	2015	2016	2017	2018	2019
Ranking	23	22	31	25	31	39	33	40	38 (tie)	39
Year	2020	2021	2022	2023	2024	2025				
Ranking	N/A	–	49	–	45 (tie)	–				
