= Thunderbird (PowerPark) =

Wooden roller coaster in Alahärmä, Finland

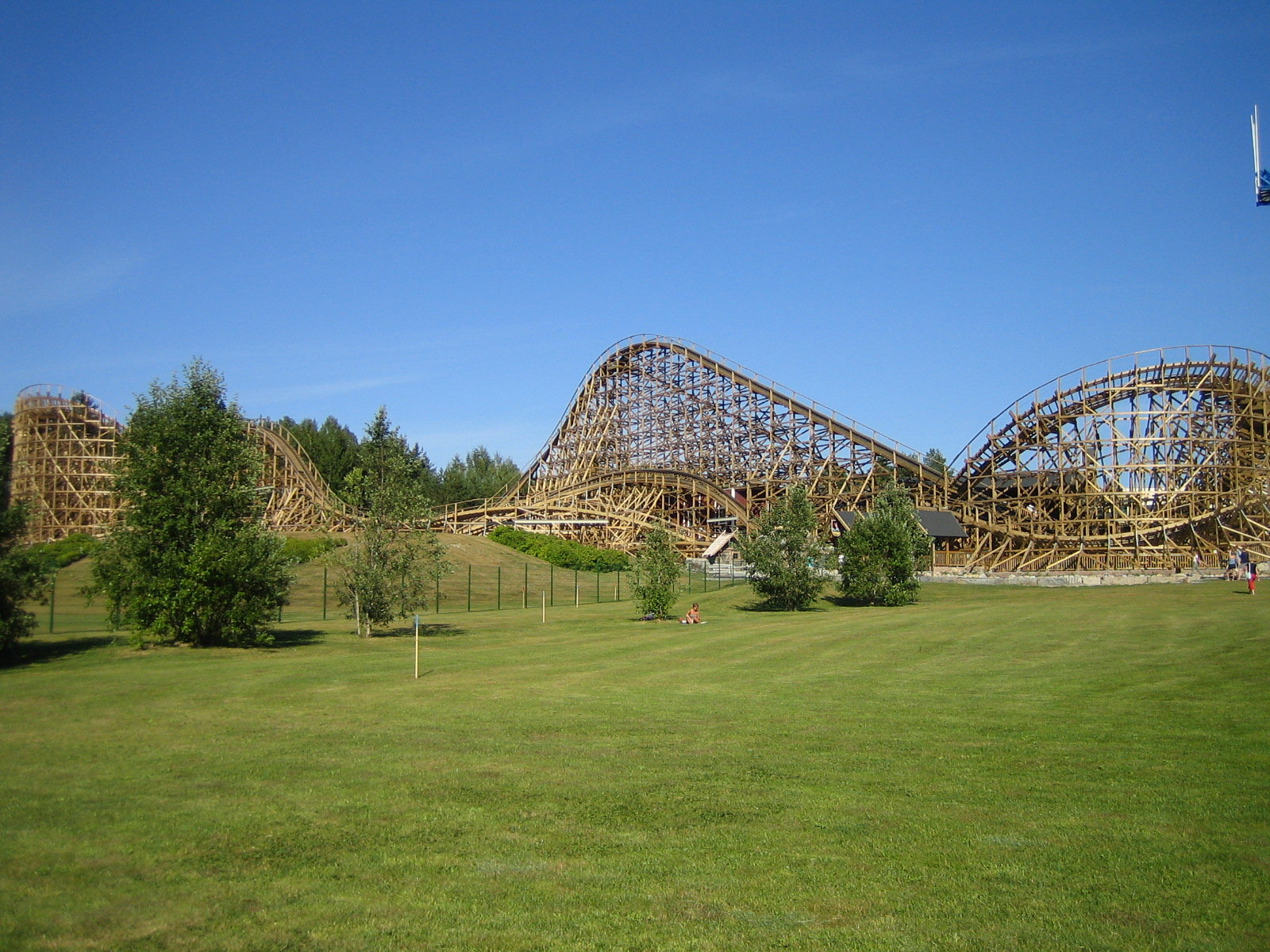
- Thunderbird in the PowerPark amusement park.

PowerPark
- Location: PowerPark
- Coordinates: 63.230636°N 22.857940°E
- Status: Operating
- Opening date: 29 April 2006

General statistics
- Type: Wood
- Manufacturer: Great Coasters International
- Track layout: Twister roller coaster
- Height: 82 ft (25 m)
- Drop: 80 ft (24 m)
- Length: 2,713 ft (827 m)
- Speed: 48 mph (77 km/h)
- Inversions: 0
- Duration: 1:33
- Height restriction: 130 cm (4 ft 3 in)
- Thunderbird at RCDB

Thunderbird is a wooden roller coaster at PowerPark in Alahärmä, Western Finland. It features two Millennium Flyer were manufactured by Great Coasters International (GCI). It is the basis for American Thunder at Six Flags St. Louis. Thunderbird is the northernmost wooden roller coaster in the world.

Thunderbird was the first wooden roller coaster in Europe to be built by GCI. Approximately 1,000 cubic metres of wood, 750,000 bolts and 1.8 million nails were used for Thunderbird's construction. President of GCI, Clair Hain, Jr., commended the Finnish carpenters for their remarkable chainsaw skills. The track is almost one kilometer in length and reaches a speed of about 75 km/h.

== Awards ==
Golden Ticket Awards: Top wood Roller Coasters
Year									1998	1999
Ranking									–	–
Year	2000	2001	2002	2003	2004	2005	2006	2007	2008	2009
Ranking	–	–	–	–	–	–	–	31	35 (tie)	34
Year	2010	2011	2012	2013	2014	2015	2016	2017	2018	2019
Ranking	37	38	–	38						
Year	2020	2021	2022	2023	2024	2025				
Ranking	N/A	–	–	–	–	–				
