= HangTime (roller coaster) =

Roller coaster at Knott's Berry Farm

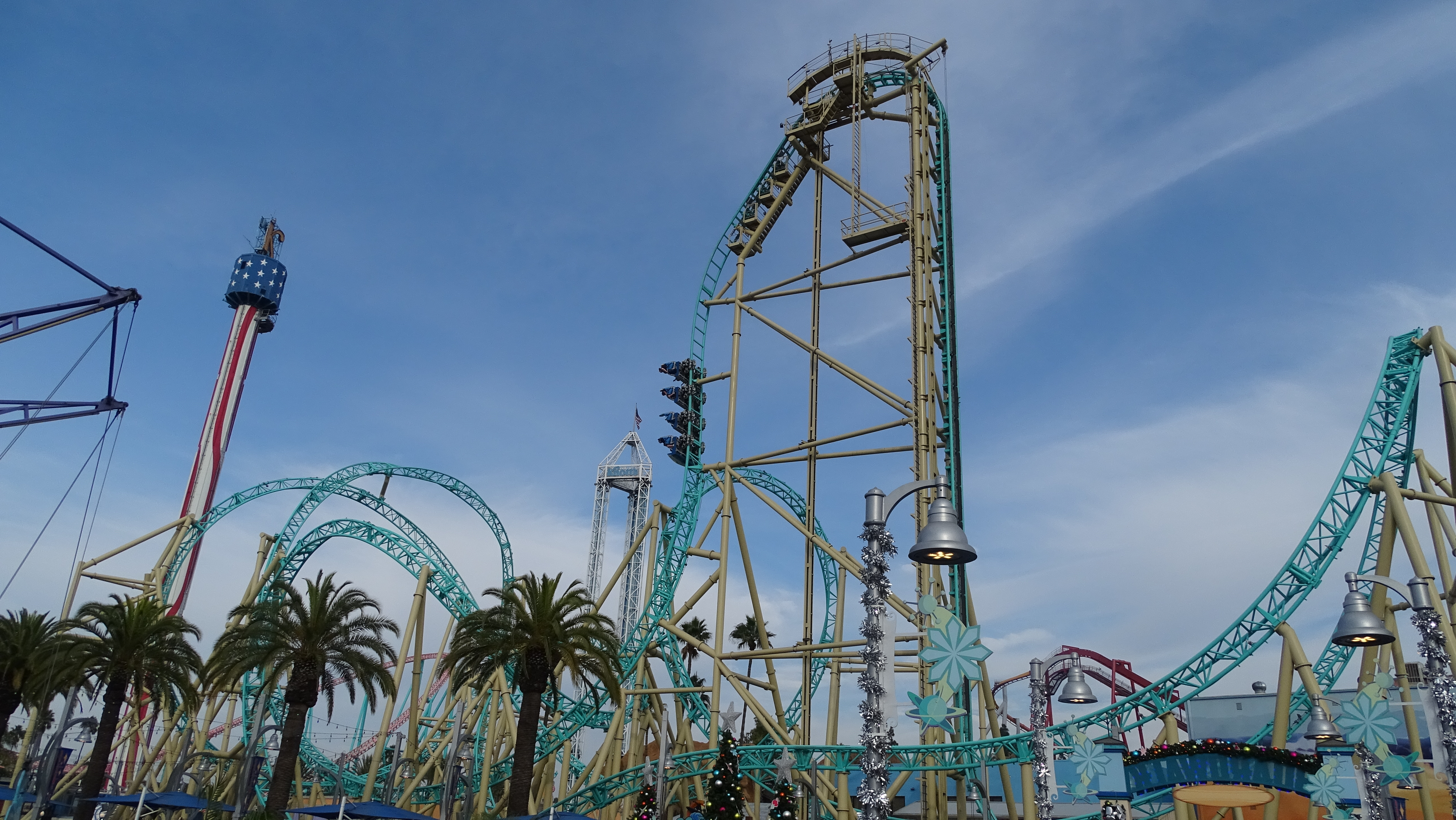
- HangTime as seen from the Boardwalk

Knott's Berry Farm
- Location: Knott's Berry Farm
- Park section: The Boardwalk
- Coordinates: 33.8448°N 118.0015°W
- Status: Operating
- Opening date: May 18, 2018
- Replaced: Boomerang, RipTide

General statistics
- Type: Steel – Infinity Coaster
- Manufacturer: Gerstlauer
- Model: Infinity Coaster
- Track layout: Custom - Infinity Coaster
- Lift/launch system: Vertical chain lift hill
- Height: 150 ft (46 m)
- Length: 2,198 ft (670 m)
- Speed: 57 mph (92 km/h)
- Inversions: 5
- Duration: 1:15
- Max vertical angle: 96°
- Capacity: 800 riders per hour
- Height restriction: 48–77 in (122–196 cm)
- Trains: 3 trains with 4 cars; riders arranged 4 across in a single row for a total of 16 riders per train
- Fast Lane available
- Wheelchair accessible
- Must transfer from wheelchair
- HangTime at RCDB

HangTime is a steel roller coaster at Knott's Berry Farm in Buena Park, California, United States. The Infinity Coaster was manufactured by Gerstlauer on the former location of attractions Boomerang and RipTide. It was announced on August 16, 2017 and opened to the public on May 18, 2018. The 2,198 feet (670 m) long roller coaster is themed after 1960s surf culture in California. It features a vertical lift hill taking riders 150 feet (46 m) high and a beyond vertical drop of 96 degrees, making it the steepest roller coaster in California.

== History ==
Knott's Berry Farm officially announced the addition of HangTime on August 16, 2017. It would be built on the former site of RipTide, a Top Spin ride that closed in 2016, and Boomerang, a shuttle roller coaster that closed on April 23, 2017. It would be the second Gerstlauer Infinity Coaster in the United States, with the first being The Monster at Adventureland in Altoona, Iowa.

Construction of HangTime began in late 2017, with the first pieces of track and supports installed in early November. The track layout was completed on January 20th, 2018. The ride conducted its first test runs two months later in March 2018.

HangTime first opened to season passholders on May 11, 2018, and to the general public a week later on May 18, 2018. Upon opening, it became the steepest roller coaster in California. The ride was also marketed by the park as the first Dive Coaster in California.

== Ride experience ==
HangTime is located in the Boardwalk section of Knott's Berry Farm, next to Coast Rider and the Sky Cabin. Guest must be between the heights of 48 inches (1.22 m) and 77 inches (1.96 m) to ride.

=== Queue ===
The outdoor queue area and HangTime itself are based on 1960s Californian surf culture. The entrance to the queue features a display of surfboards and a "surf conditions" sign indicating the ride's current wait time. The queue includes sand and plants native to coastal environments. The ride's maintenance shop, designed to resemble a surfboard shop, and a mural depicting a sunset beach are also visible from the queue.

=== Layout ===
The train leaves the station and starts climbing the 150-foot (46 m) vertical lift hill. Upon reaching the top, the train is held for five seconds before plunging at a 96-degree angle. The train reaches a max speed of 57 miles per hour (92 km/h) and heads through a negative-g stall loop, a one-of-a-kind inversion. This inversion is similar to a Norwegian loop, except the train enters a non-inverted dive loop followed by a sidewinder before exiting in the opposite direction. The train moves through a corkscrew and a cutback. Following the cutback, the train goes through a small camelback hill. The train then enters a cobra roll located in front of the negative-g stall loop. After exiting the cobra roll, the train passes the on-ride camera, which takes photos of the riders. The train slows down on the brake run, turns right and heads back into the station.

== Characteristics ==
=== Trains ===
HangTime operates with a maximum of three trains. The trains are arranged in four cars with four rows to accommodate a total of 16 riders, giving it a theoretical capacity of 800 riders per hour. Cars contain blue seats with surfboard-themed headrests. Riders are secured by lap bar restraints and an additional seatbelt.

=== Track ===
The track is 2,198 feet (670 m) long and reaches a maximum height of approximately 150 feet (46 m). Its steel structure was fabricated by OCEM Structural Steelwork. The track is colored light teal with tan supports. The track contains a lighting installation by KCL Engineering, which illuminates the track blue, pink, and purple colors at night. The color scheme is periodically adjusted to correspond with park events, such as to red and green for Knott's Merry Farm or deep purple for the Boysenberry Festival. A lighting controller lets the Knott's entertainment team manage both pre-programmed and custom lighting sequences, including live music synchronization.

== Reception ==
HangTime has been generally well-received by critics. Arthur Levine of USA Today praised the ride's stall at the top of its lift hill, stating that it "bumps up already racing pulses, increased respiration rates, and surging adrenaline". Eric Wooley of Coaster101 described the ride as thrilling, labeling the vertical lift hill "the most intense part of the ride". He noted that the last row of the train appeared to give a unique feeling of ejector airtime. Both reviewers described the ride to be relatively smooth and complimented its restraints and lighting installment.

== Gallery ==
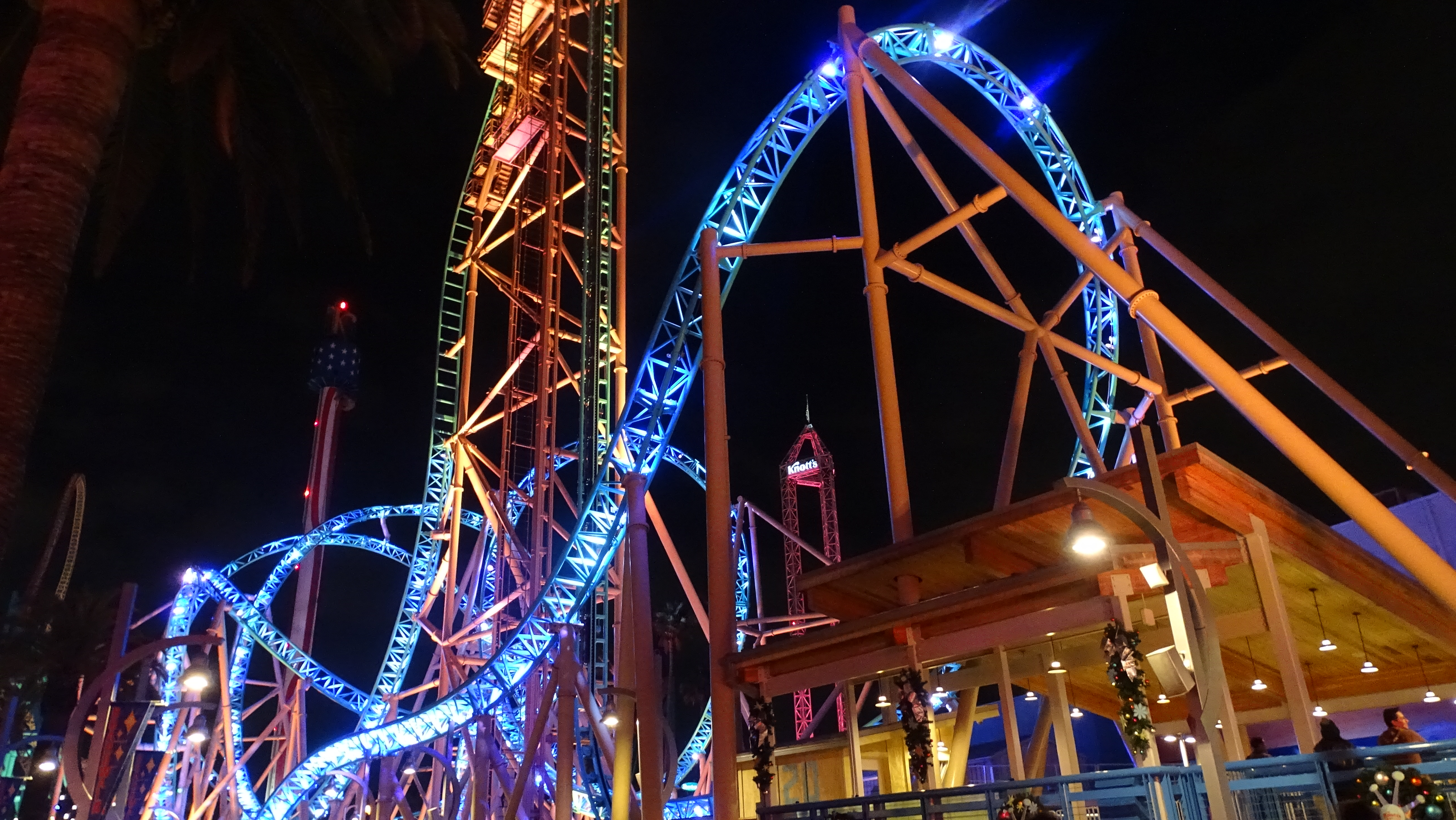
HangTime at night

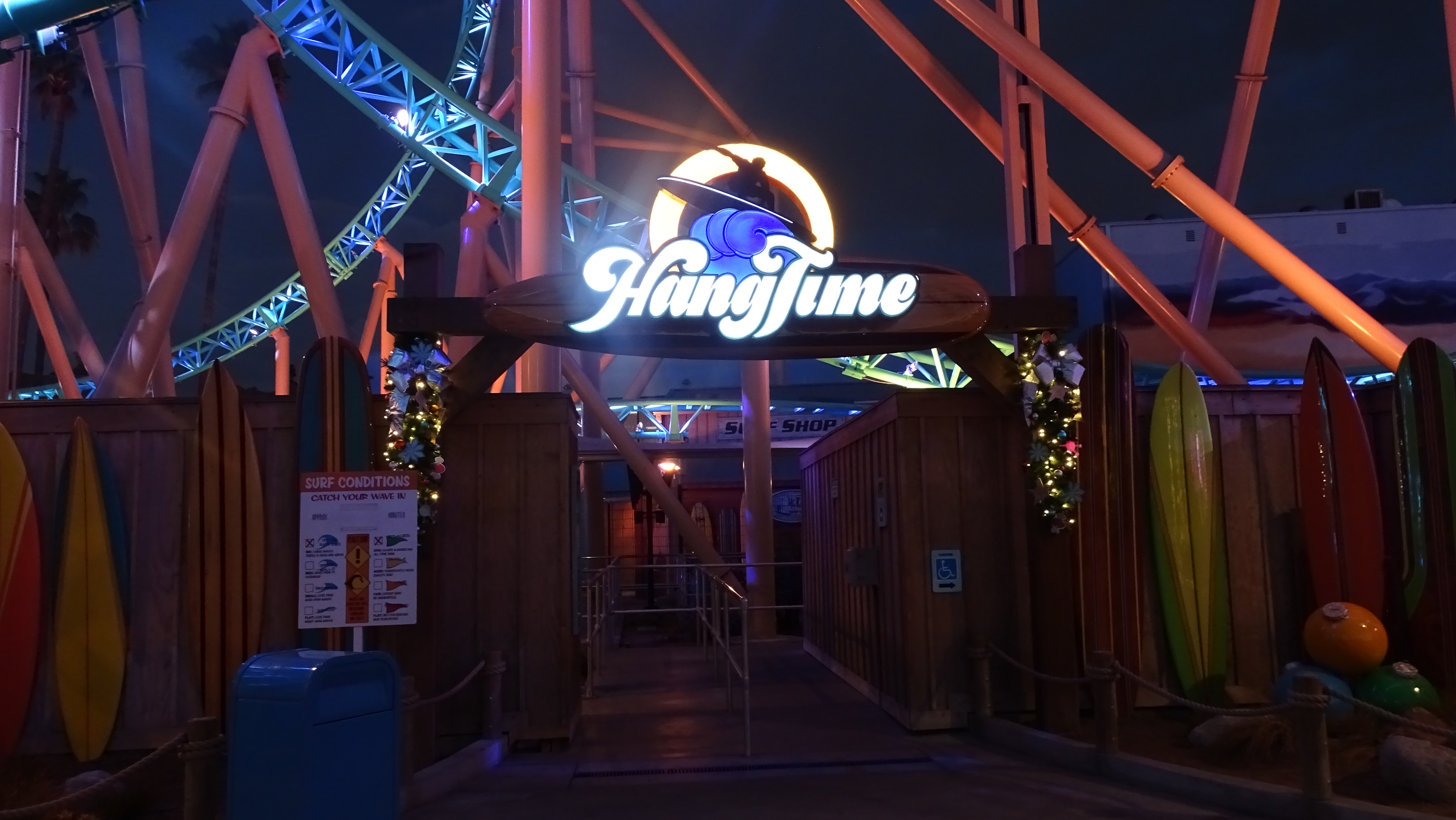
HangTime's entrance at night

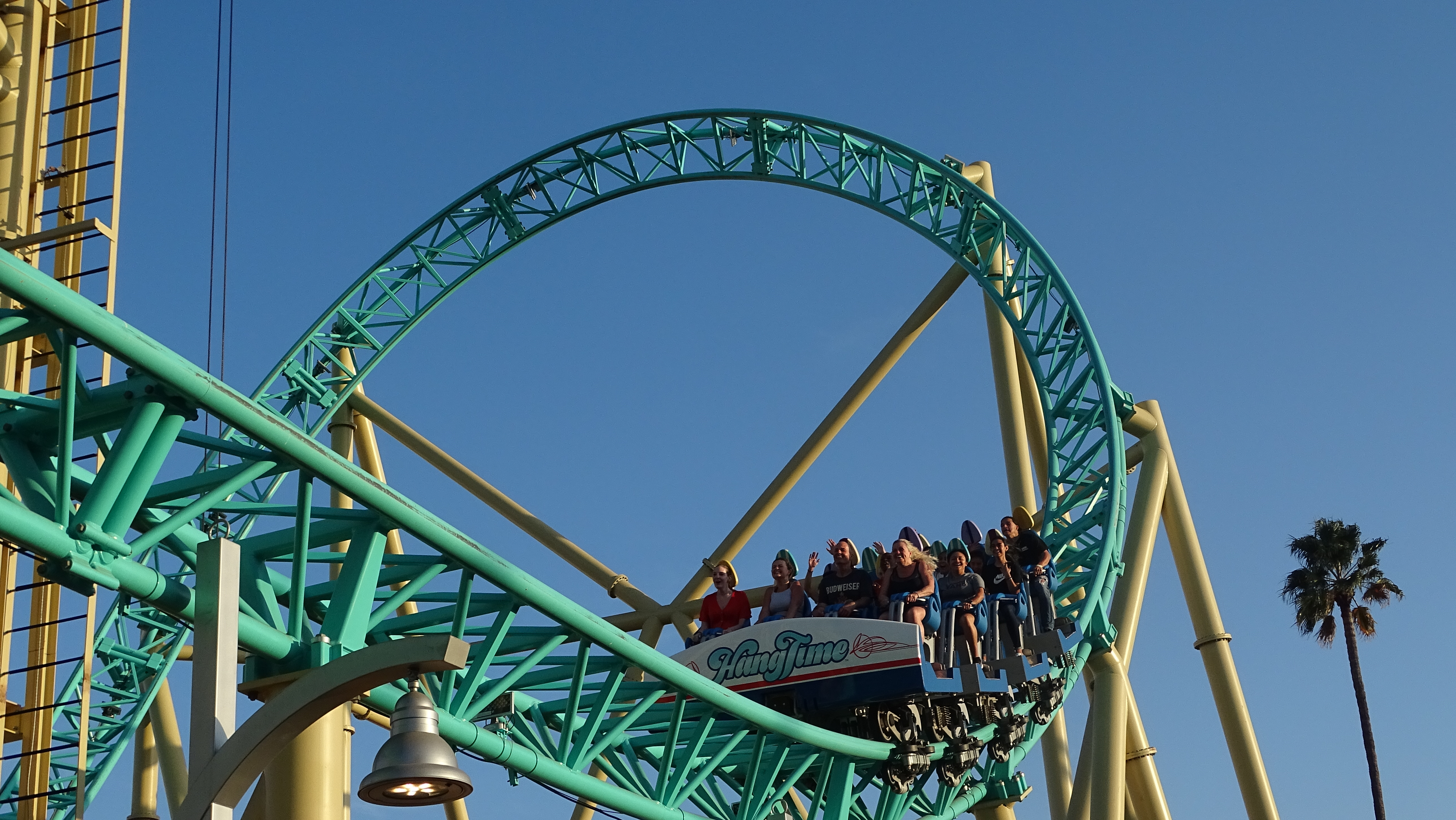
HangTime's train as it passes over the ride's entrance

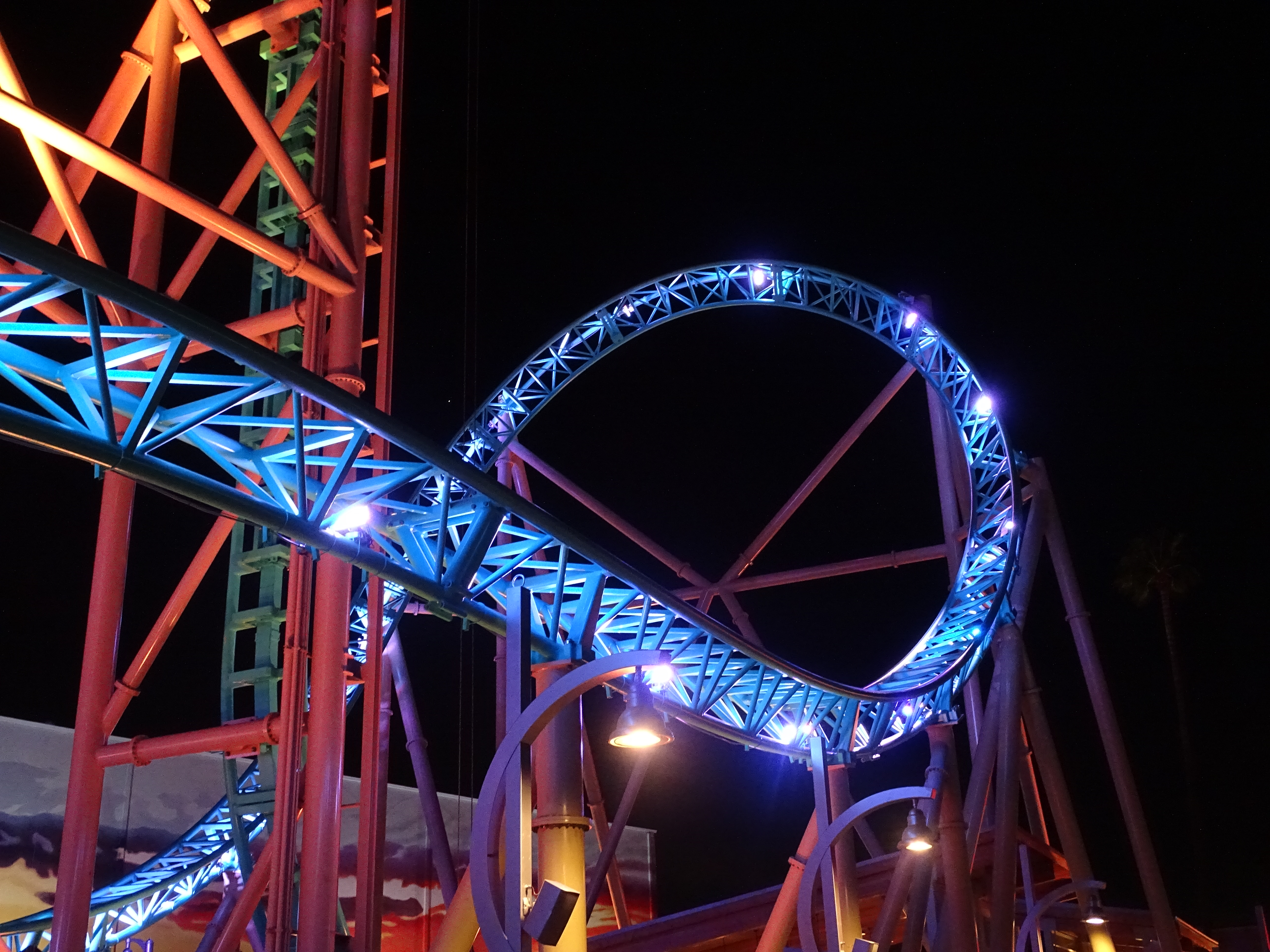
HangTime's track lights up at night

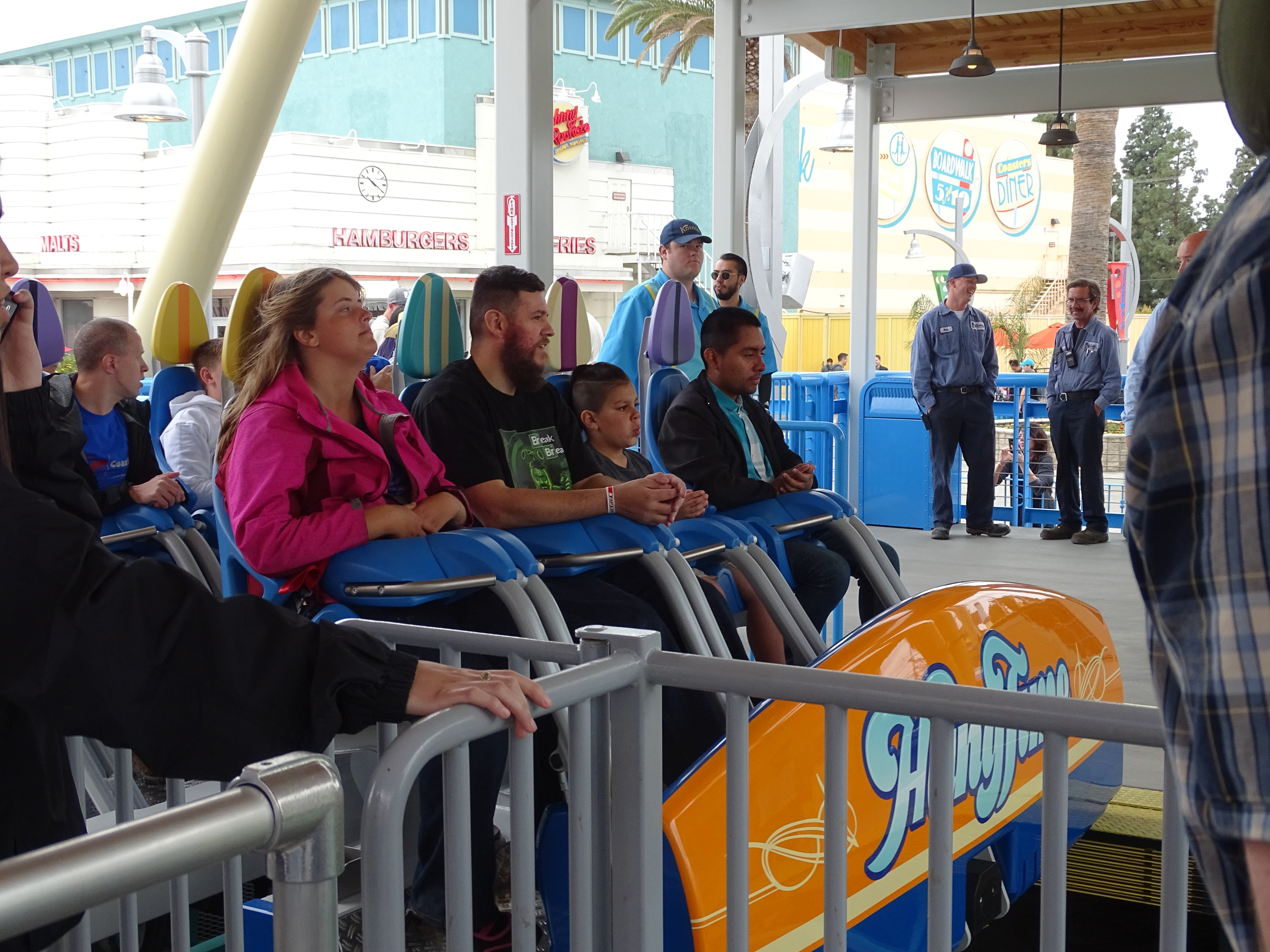
HangTime features 16 seats

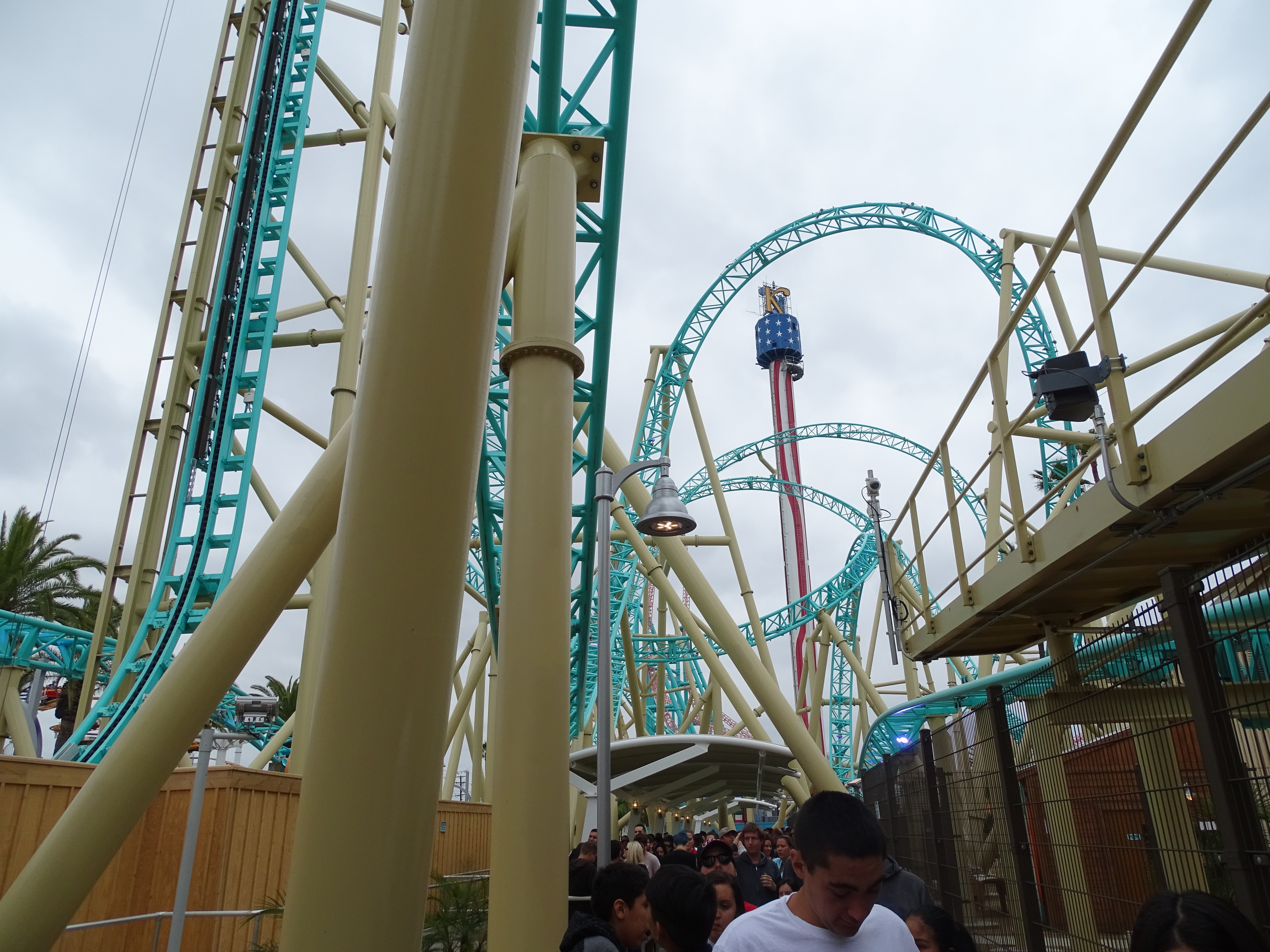
HangTime's queue on its opening day to the public

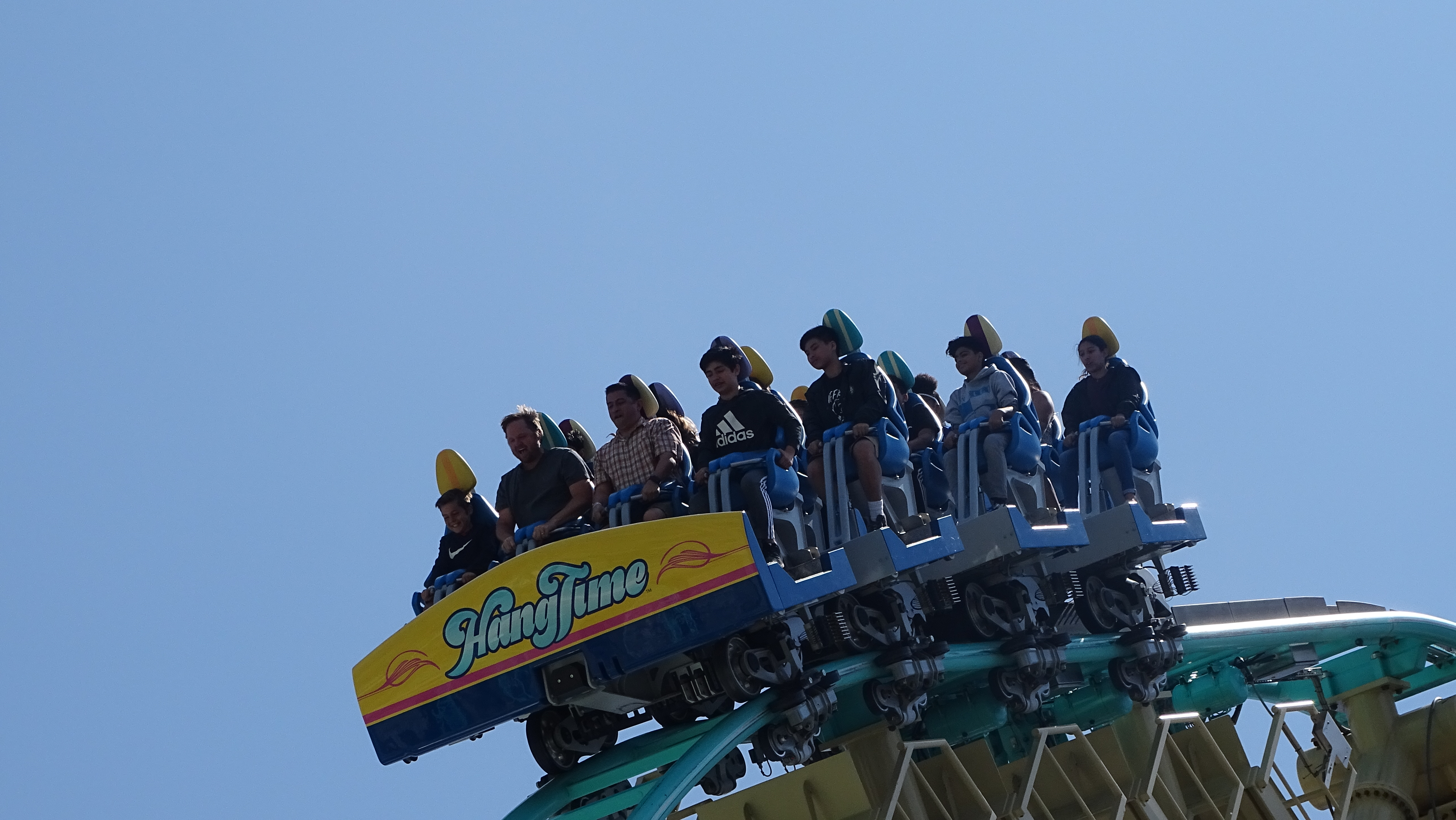
The train at the top peak: 150 ft

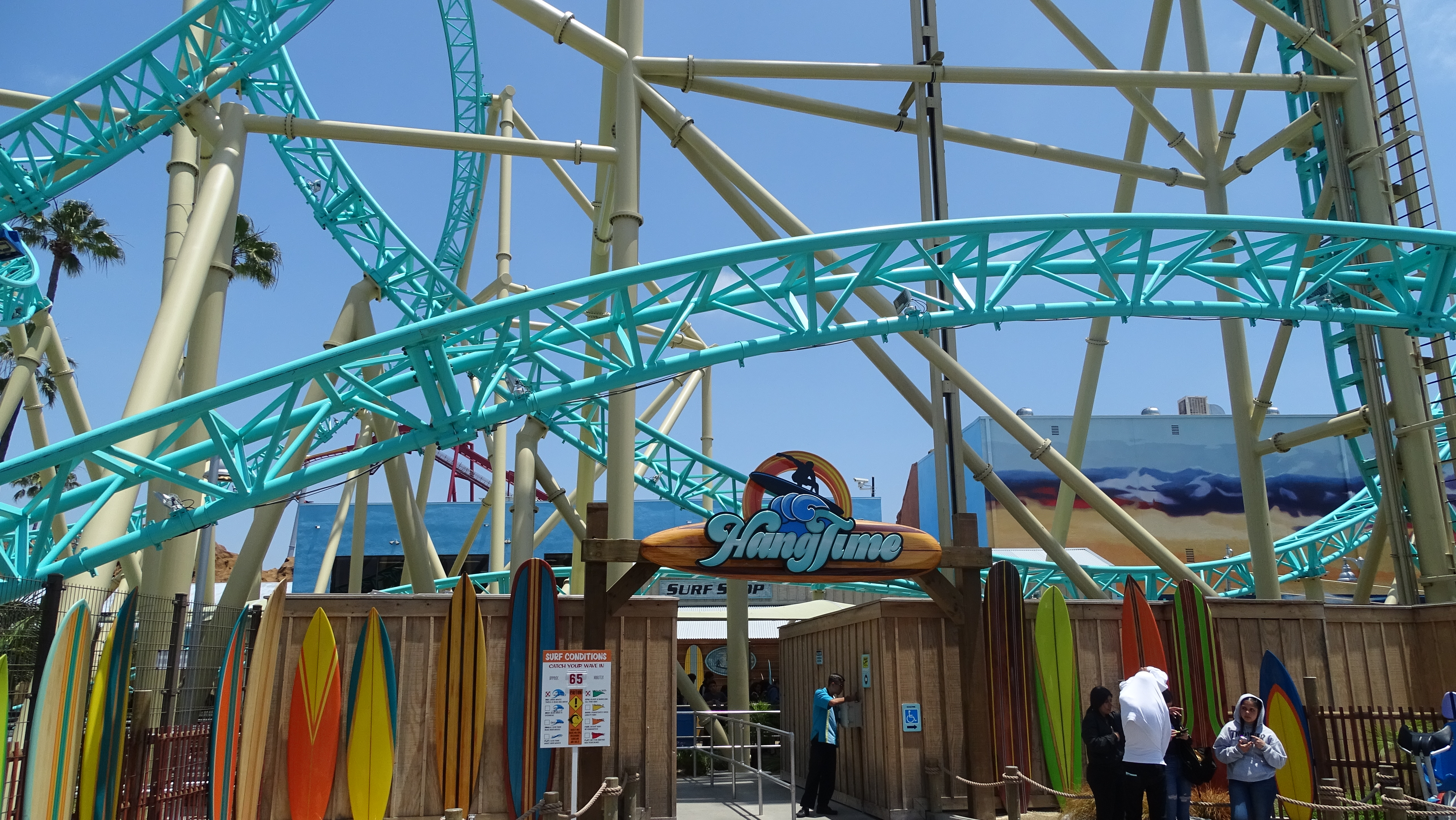
Ride's entrance

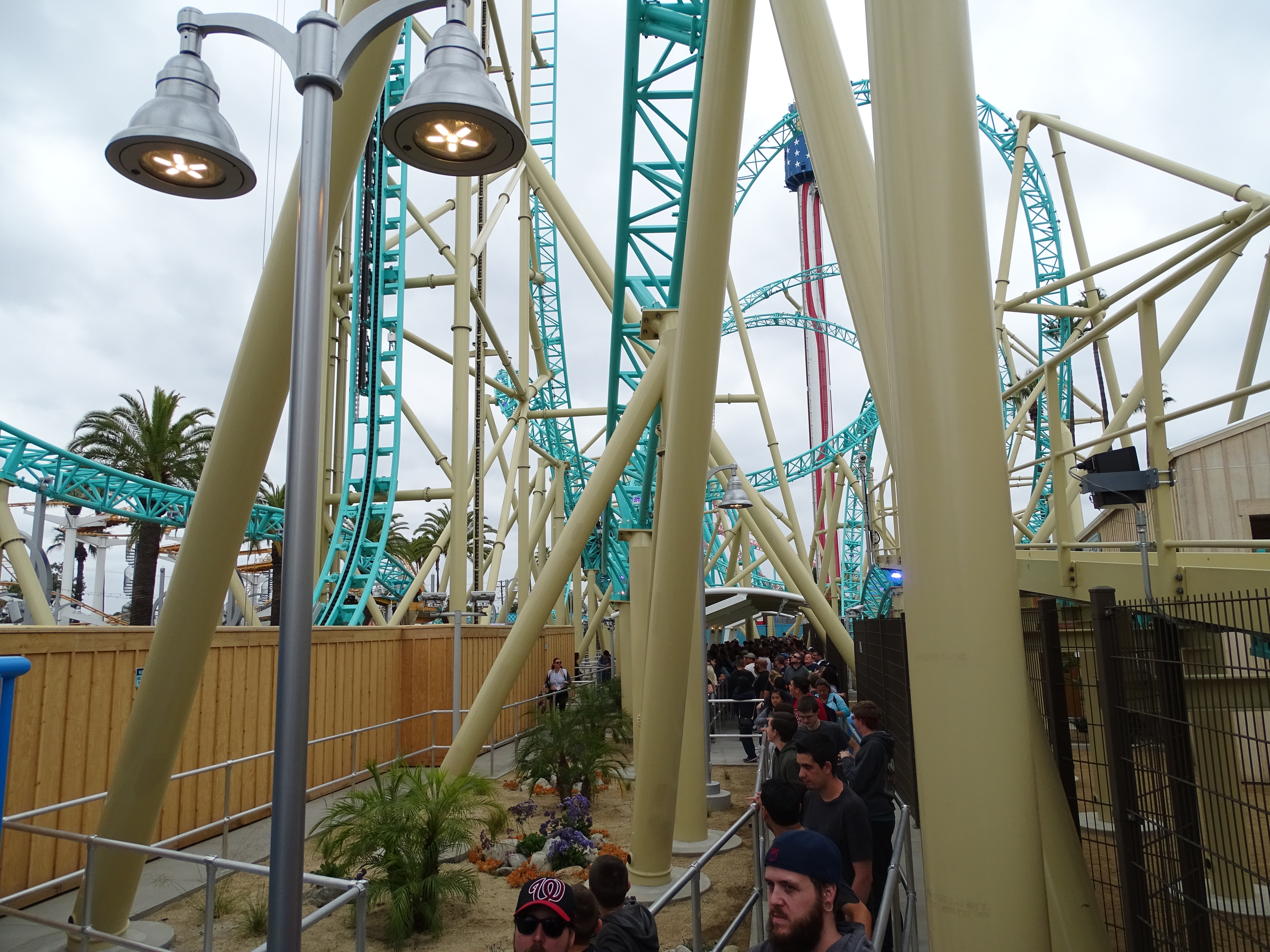
Ride queue on opening day (May 16, 2018)

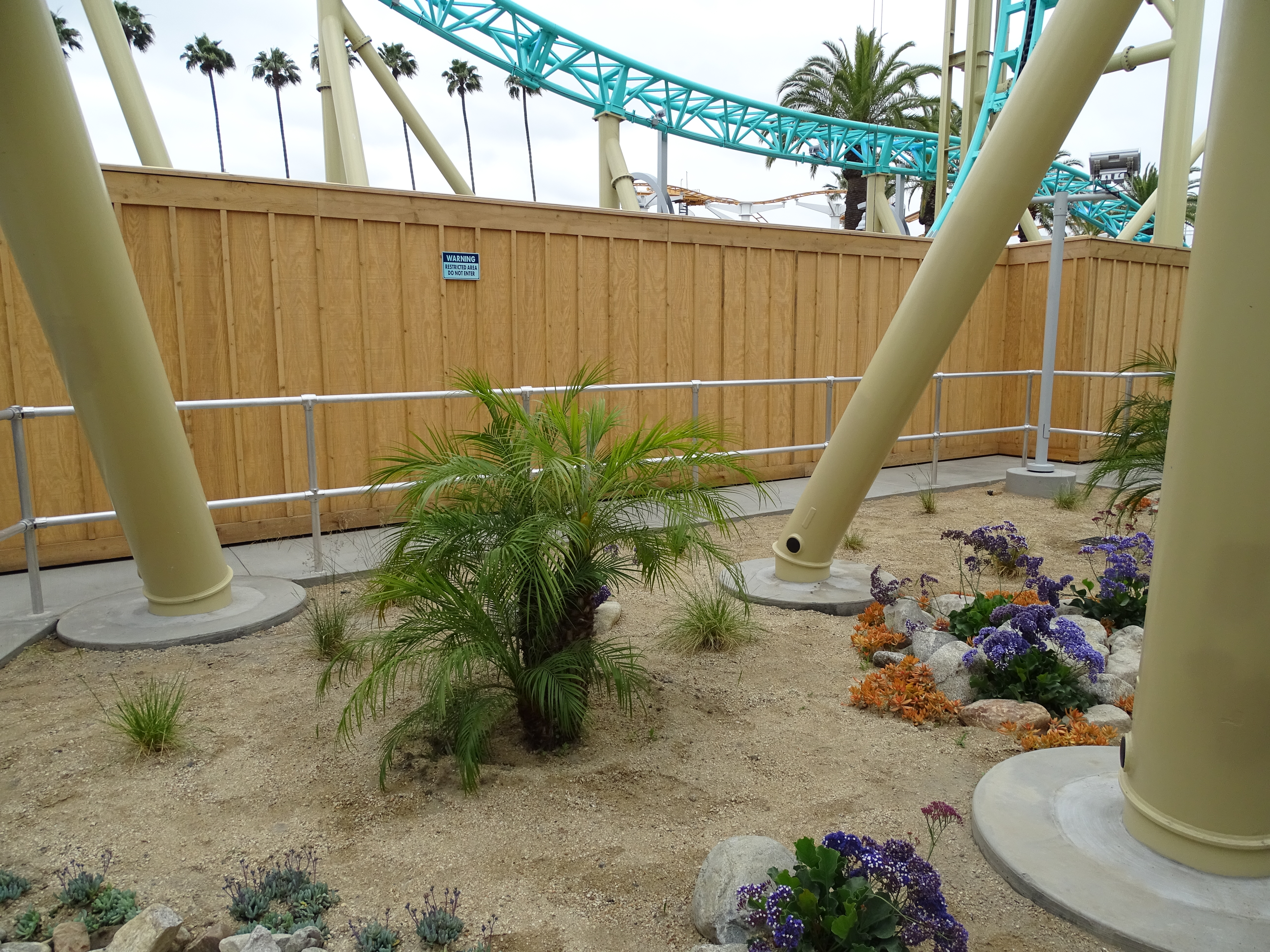
HangTime's ride queue features a beach type setting

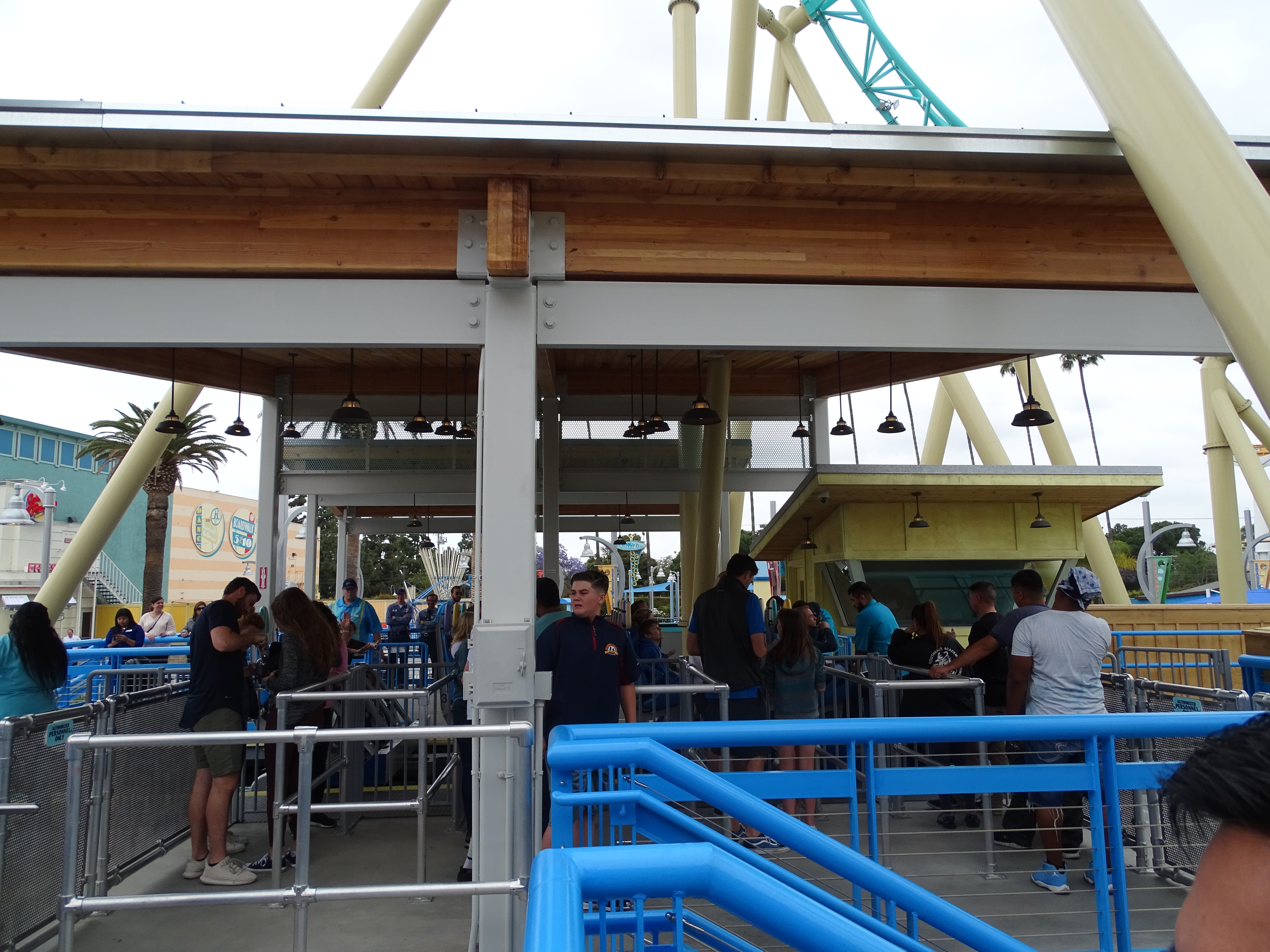
HangTime's station

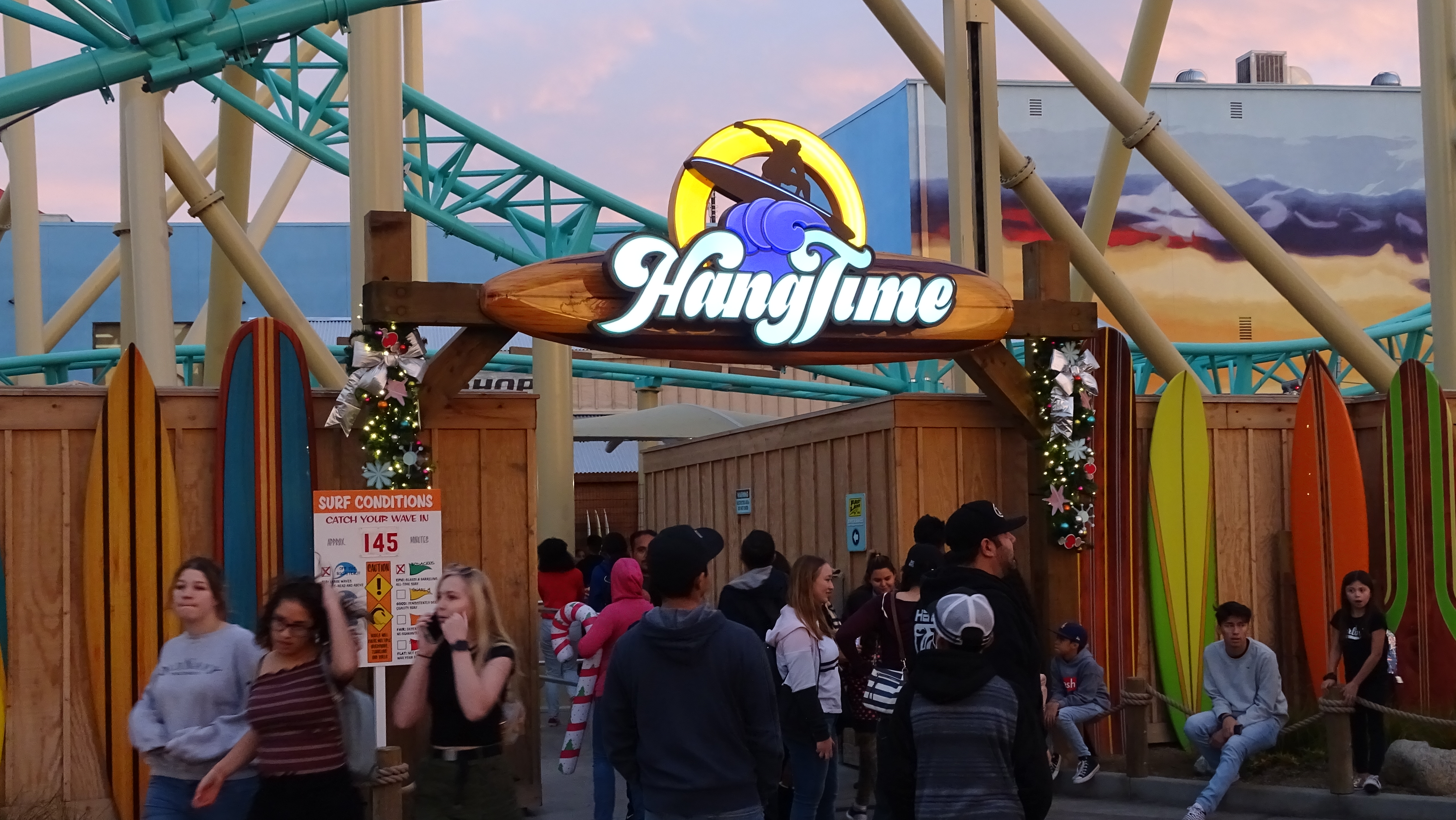
HangTime's entrance on a busy day

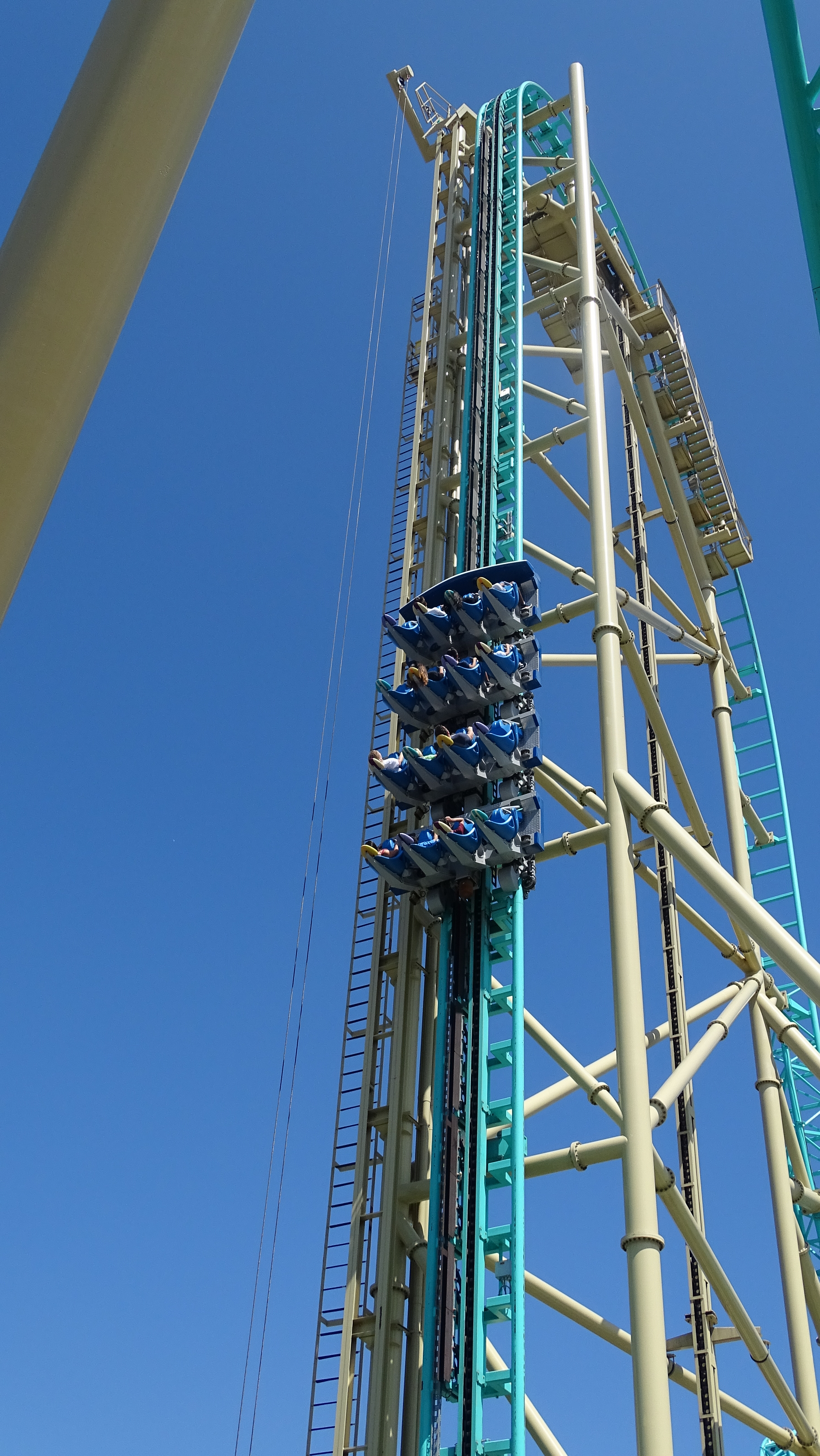
Lift hill
