= Cobra (PowerPark) =

Roller coaster at PowerPark, Finland

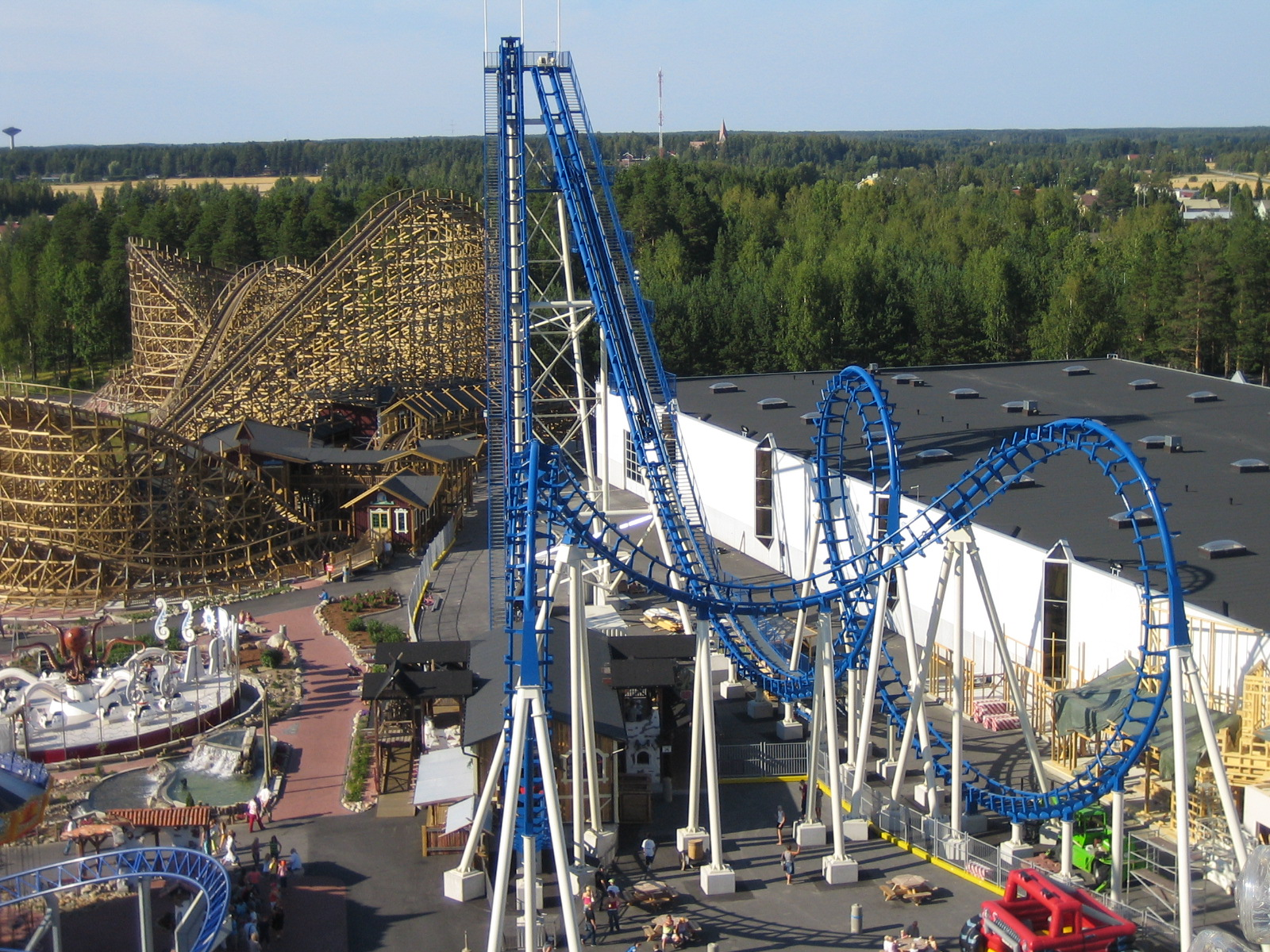
- Cobra in the PowerPark amusement park.

PowerPark, Alahärmä, Kauhava, Finland
- Location: PowerPark, Alahärmä, Kauhava, Finland
- Coordinates: 63.229846°N 22.858694°E
- Status: Operating
- Opening date: 2005

General statistics
- Type: Steel – Shuttle
- Manufacturer: Vekoma
- Model: Boomerang
- Height: 35.5 m (116 ft)
- Length: 935 ft (285 m)
- Speed: 47 mph (76 km/h)
- Inversions: 3
- Duration: 1:48
- Capacity: 760 riders per hour
- G-force: 5.2
- Height restriction: 130–195 cm (4 ft 3 in – 6 ft 5 in)
- Cobra at RCDB

Cobra is a roller coaster located at PowerPark in Kauhava, Southern Ostrobothnia, Finland. Cobra was the first Vekoma Boomerang to use the new MK1211 open sided train.

In 2018, the ride stalled after experiencing technical difficulties, forcing passengers to be evacuated.
