= Karacho =

Roller coaster

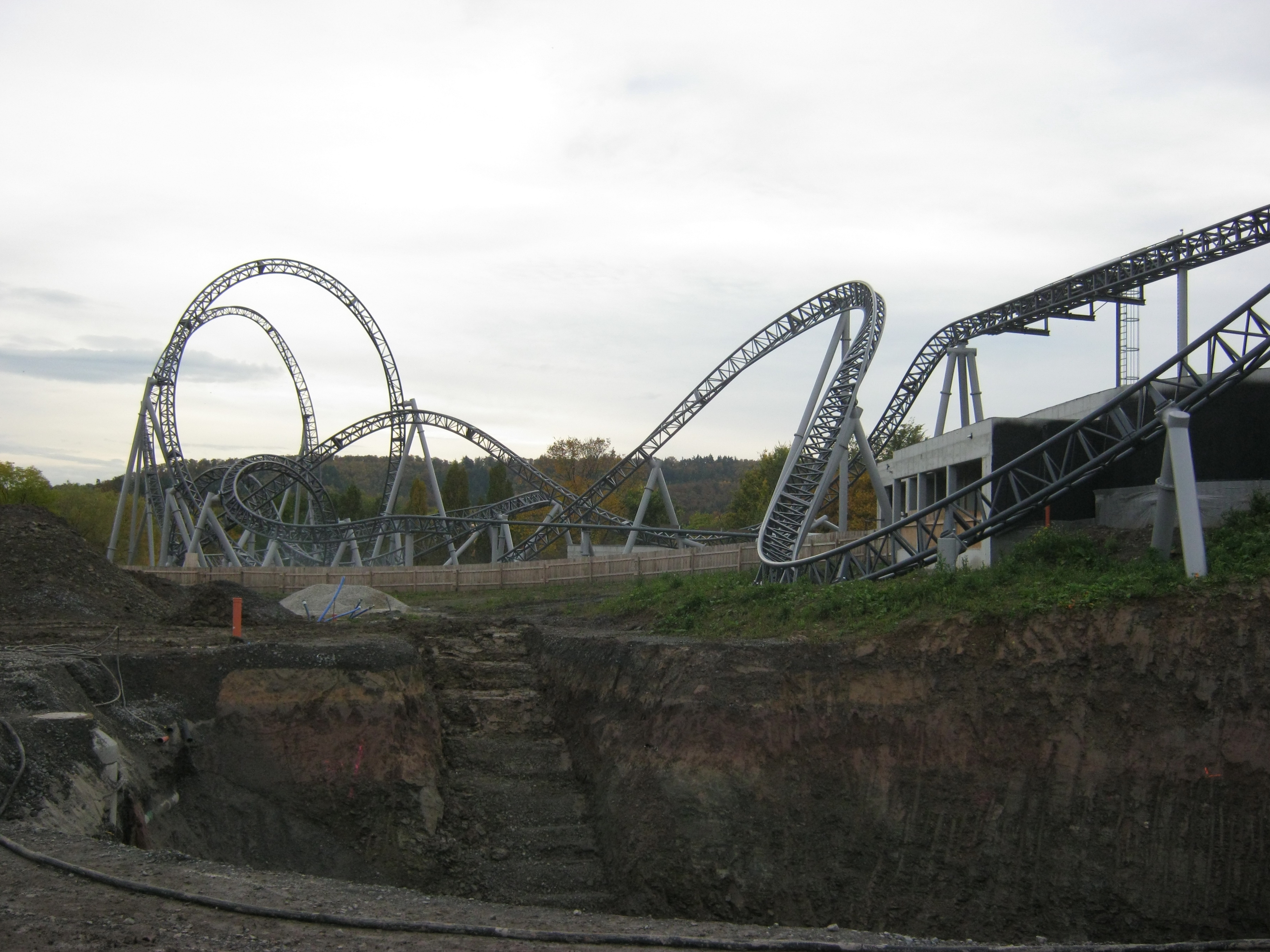

Erlebnispark Tripsdrill
- Location: Erlebnispark Tripsdrill
- Coordinates: 49.037678°N 9.054356°E
- Status: Operating
- Opening date: 10 July 2013
- Cost: €7,000,000

General statistics
- Type: Steel – Launched
- Manufacturer: Gerstlauer
- Designer: Imaginvest
- Model: Infinity Coaster
- Lift/launch system: Linear synchronous motor launch
- Height: 30 m (98 ft)
- Length: 700 m (2,300 ft)
- Speed: 100 km/h (62 mph)
- Inversions: 4
- Capacity: 960 riders per hour
- Acceleration: 0 to 100 km/h (0 to 62 mph) in 1.6 seconds
- Height restriction: 125–195 cm (4 ft 1 in – 6 ft 5 in)
- Karacho at RCDB

Karacho is a Gerstlauer steel roller coaster at Erlebnispark Tripsdrill, Germany designed by Imaginvest. It opened on 10 July 2013. It features a launch and 4 inversions, and accelerates to 100 kilometres per hour (62 mph) in 1.6 seconds.

The ride was Gerstlauer's 50th roller coaster, with Erlebnispark Tripsdrill also being the park where the company installed their first roller coaster.
