= PowerPark =

Amusement park in South Ostrobothnia, Finland

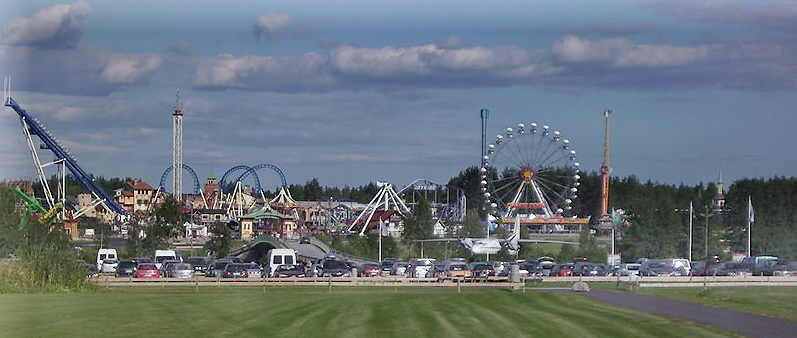
- Interactive map of PowerPark
- Location: Alahärmä, Kauhava, Finland
- Coordinates: 63°13′42″N 022°51′35″E
- Status: Operating
- Opened: 1999, rides area 2002
- Owner: Lillbacka enterprises
- Operating season: May to August (rides area) / throughout the year
- Attendance: 400,000–450,000 (2015)
- Area: 160 ha (400 acres)

Attractions
- Total: 42
- Roller coasters: 6
- Water rides: 2
- Website: www.powerpark.fi/en/

PowerPark is a large scale amusement park in Alahärmä, Finland. It is located along Highway 19, 66 kilometres (41 mi) north of Seinäjoki and 76 kilometres (47 mi) east of Vaasa. The park includes a karting track resembling an F1 circuit that has previously hosted the Karting World Championship. The resort additionally contains a restaurant, hotel, camping area with cottages and a variety of amusement rides.

PowerPark was founded by Jorma Lillbacka, an entrepreneur and financier from Alahärmä, and according to estimates by Talouselämä magazine, Lillbacka has invested 100–200 million euros in the amusement park since its establishment. In 2015, PowerPark had as many as 450,000 visitors. In a study conducted by Taloustutkimus Oy, the PowerPark experience park was rated the best leisure center in Finland in 2010, 2013, 2014, 2015 and 2016. The South Ostrobothnia Tourism Prize (Etelä-Pohjanmaan matkailupalkinto) was also awarded to PowerPark in 2010.

== PowerLand ==
=== Major rides ===
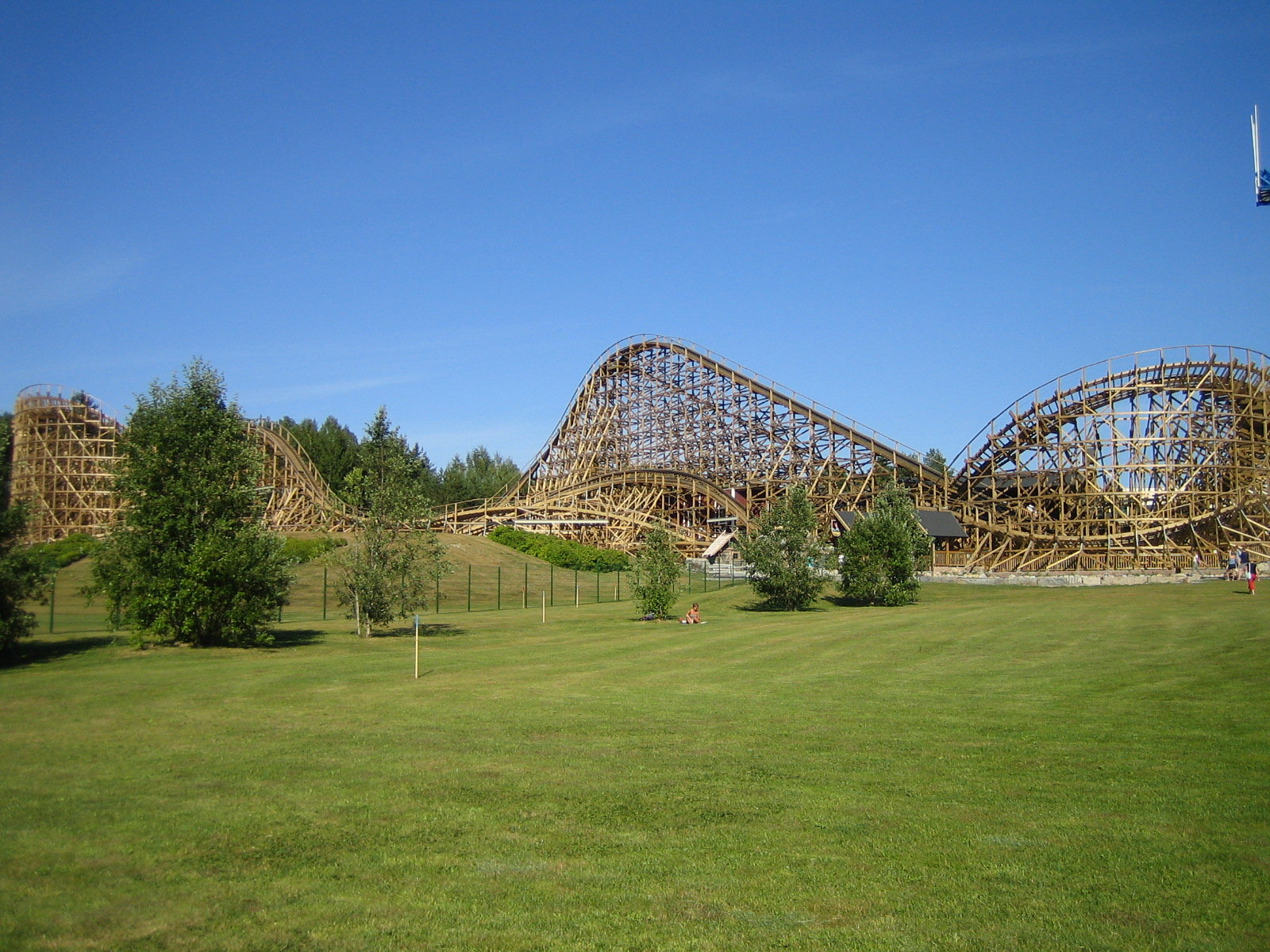
Thunderbird in PowerPark

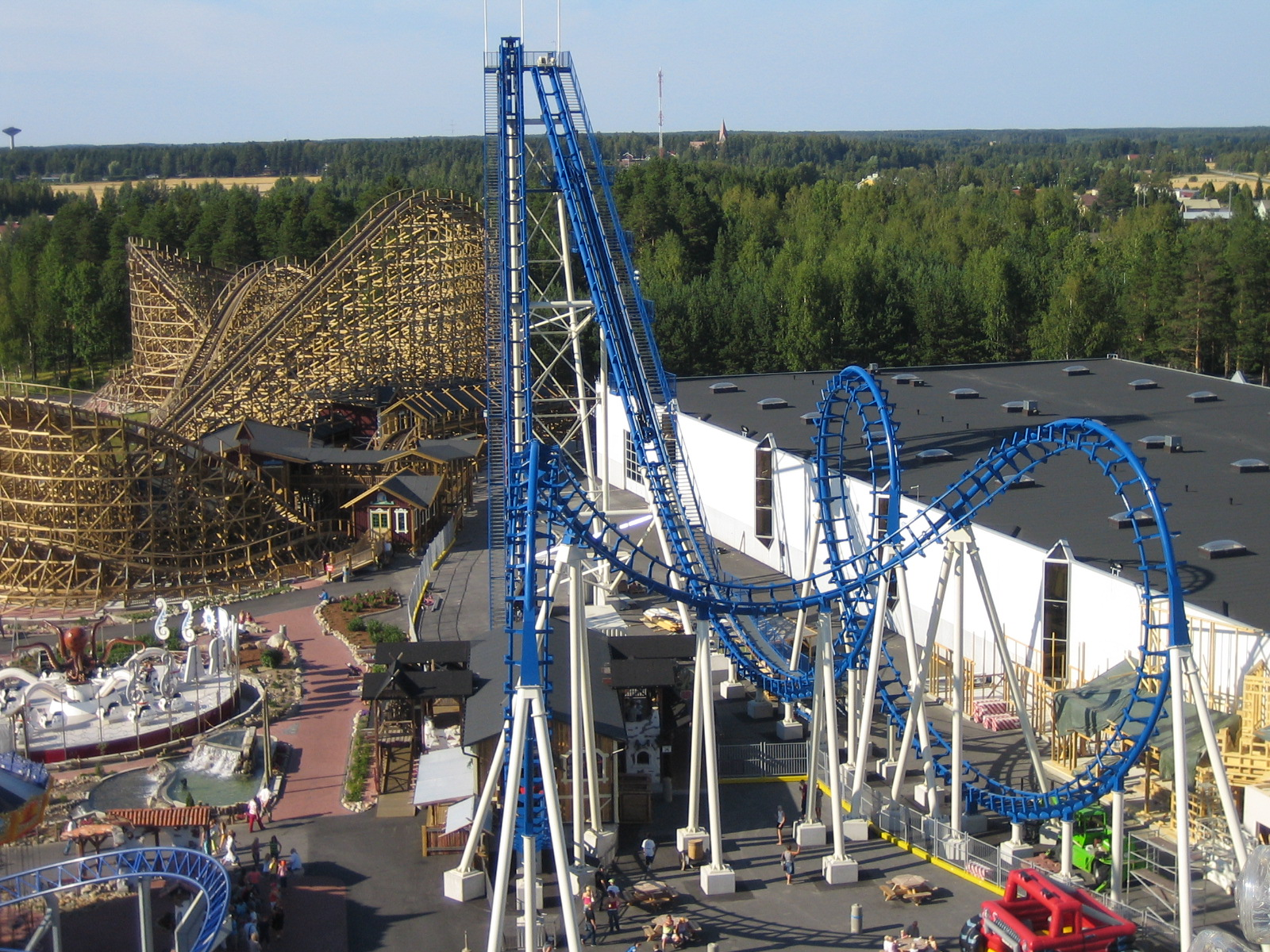
Cobra in PowerPark

Name	Manufacturer	Model	Opened	Ride type
Thunderbird	GCI	Wooden Coaster	2006	Rollercoaster, wood
Cobra	Vekoma	Boomerang	2005	Rollercoaster, looping
Junker	Gerstlauer	Infinity Coaster	2015	Rollercoaster, looping
Joyride	L&T Systems	Coaster 47x21	2003	Rollercoaster
Neo's Twister	Fabbri	Mouse 40	2011	Rollercoaster
Piovra	Moser's Rides	Polyp	2004	Thrill ride
Pitts Special	Gerstlauer	Infinity Coaster Custom	2020	Rollercoaster
Typhoon 360	Technical Park	Typhoon 360	2004	Spectacular
Booster	Fabbri	Booster	2003	Spectacular
Music Express	Barbieri	Musik Express	2002	Thrill ride
Dragon Tower	Moser's Rides	Mach Tower	2012	Drop tower
Giant Wheel	Fabbri	Giant Wheel 34	2003	
La Paloma	Zierer	Wave Swinger	2005	
Bumper Cars	Gosetto / cars IE Park	Bumper Cars	2003	
Fiesta Mexicana	Zamperla	Star Flyer	2007	Thrill ride
Pegasus	Technical Park	Pegasus	2008	Spectacular
Kwai River	Interlink LG	Log flume	2013	Water ride
Enterprise	Huss	Enterprise	2019	Thrill Ride

In 2007, a worker died after being hit by the Typhoon ride. According to the news, she was retrieving a shoe. After the incident, the park was closed earlier than usual and both workers and customers were given crisis aid.

=== Family rides ===
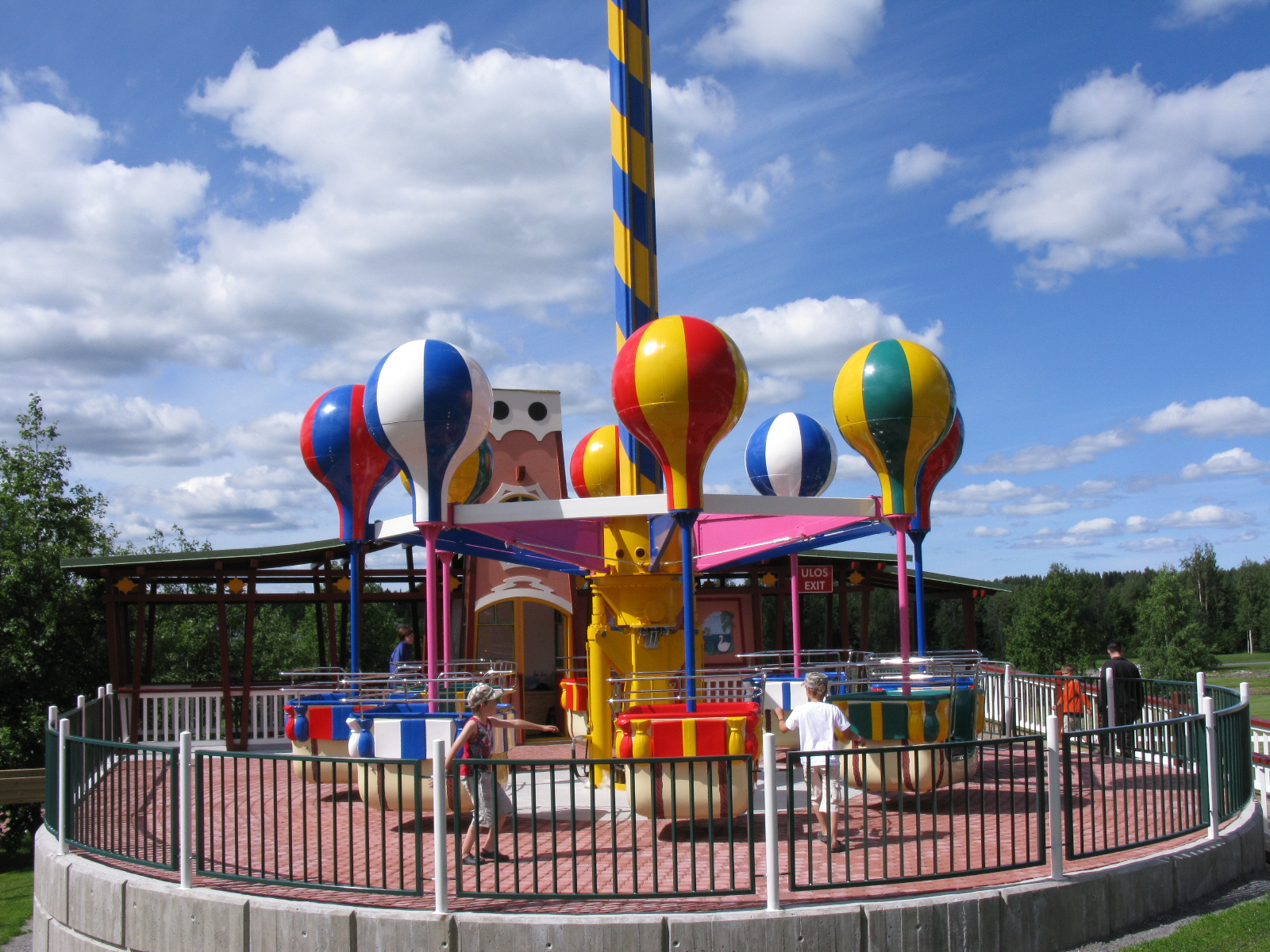
Balloon Tower in PowerPark

Name	Manufacturer	Model	Opened	Ride type
Dino Safari Jeep	Zamperla		2002	
Crazy House	Barbieri		2003	
Time Machine			2005	
Galeon	Zamperla	Rockin' Tug	2007	Thrill ride
Mine Train	Zamperla	Family Gravity Coaster 80STD	2007	Rollercoaster
Devil's Mine Hotel	Gosetto	Dark Ride	2007	
Real Snacks Jetski	Zierer	Jet Skis	2013	Thrill Ride
Balloon Tower	Technical Park	Balloon Tower	2008	

=== Kiddie rides ===
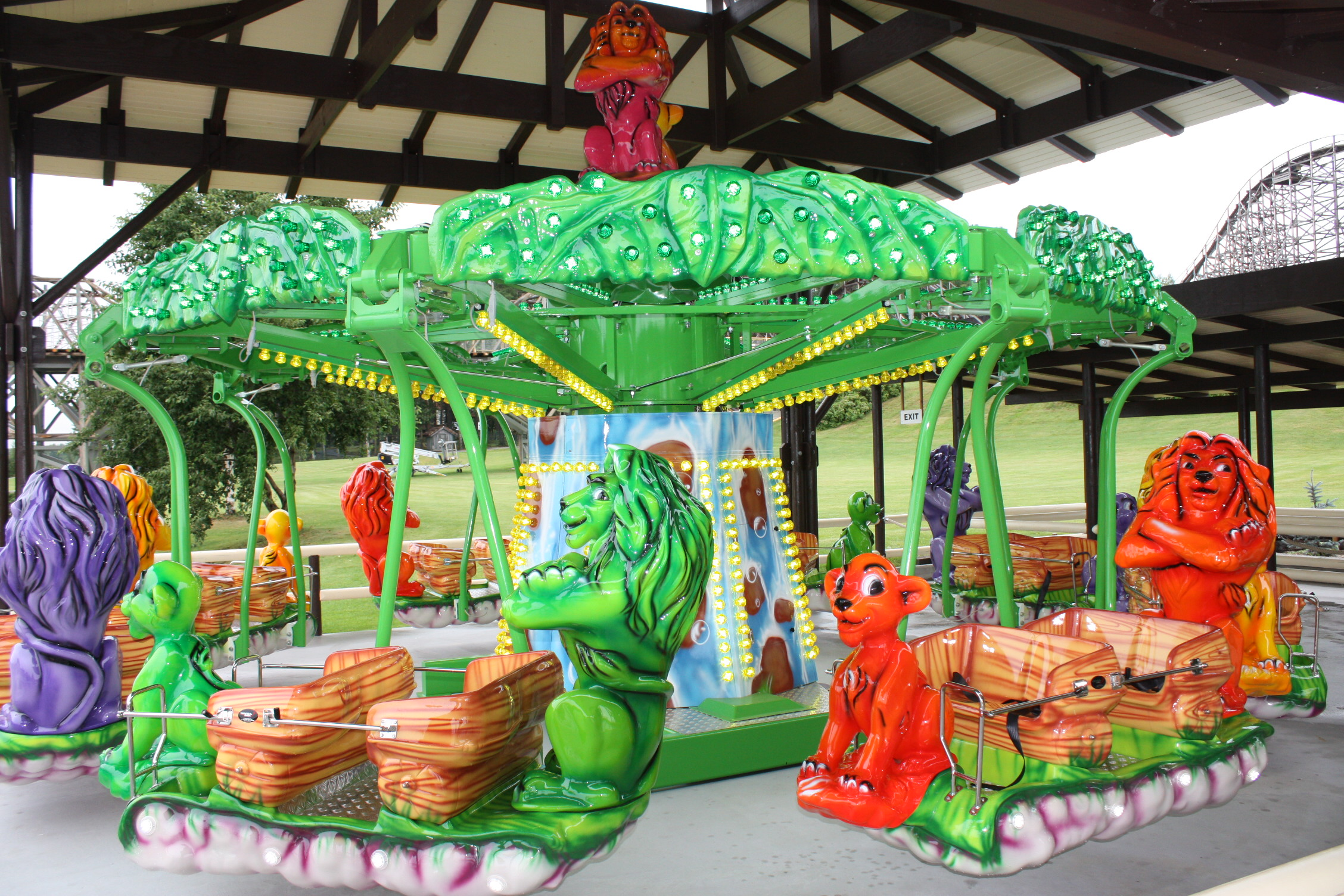
Lion King-ride

Name	Manufacturer	Model	Opened	Ride type
Jumping Star	Zamperla	Jumping Star	2002	
Rio Grande Train	Zamperla	Rio Grande	2003	
Wild Horse Carousel			2002	
Mini Jets	Zamperla		2003	
Mini Tea Cup	Zamperla	Teacup Ride	2002	
Chain Carousel	Sopark	Wave Swinger	2002	
Mill River			2005	
Chuck Wagon	Zamperla	Ferris Wheel	2005	
Jump Around	Zamperla		2007	
Pirate Ship	Lappset		2002	
Captain Hook	Zamperla		2009	
Lion King	Technical Park	Flying Twist – Aladino	2011	

=== Removed rides ===
Name	Manufacturer	Model	Opened	Ride type
Tapis Volant	Fabbri	Flying Carpet	2002–2005	Thrill ride
Dark Ride	Emiliana Luna Park	Ghost Train	2005–2006	
Mega Drop	Fabbri	Freefalll	2002–2011	

== Horse centre ==
The Riding Centre of PowerPark started its operations in 2008. The centre is located in a peaceful place, behind a small woods, in the vicinity of PowerPark. The Riding Centre will provide horse treks of different kinds in South Ostrobothnian landscapes.

== Harness racing track ==
In the spring of 2016, a harness racing track was completed at PowerPark. Its curves are gentle, there are no elevation changes, and the banking allows for fast trotting even in the corners.

In Härmä, the old harness racing track, located two kilometers from the Powerpark track, is still in use as well. PowerPark is set to host the prestigious Kuninkuusravit harness racing championship in 2028 together with the old racing track in Härmä.
