= Erlebnispark Tripsdrill =

Amusement park in Germany

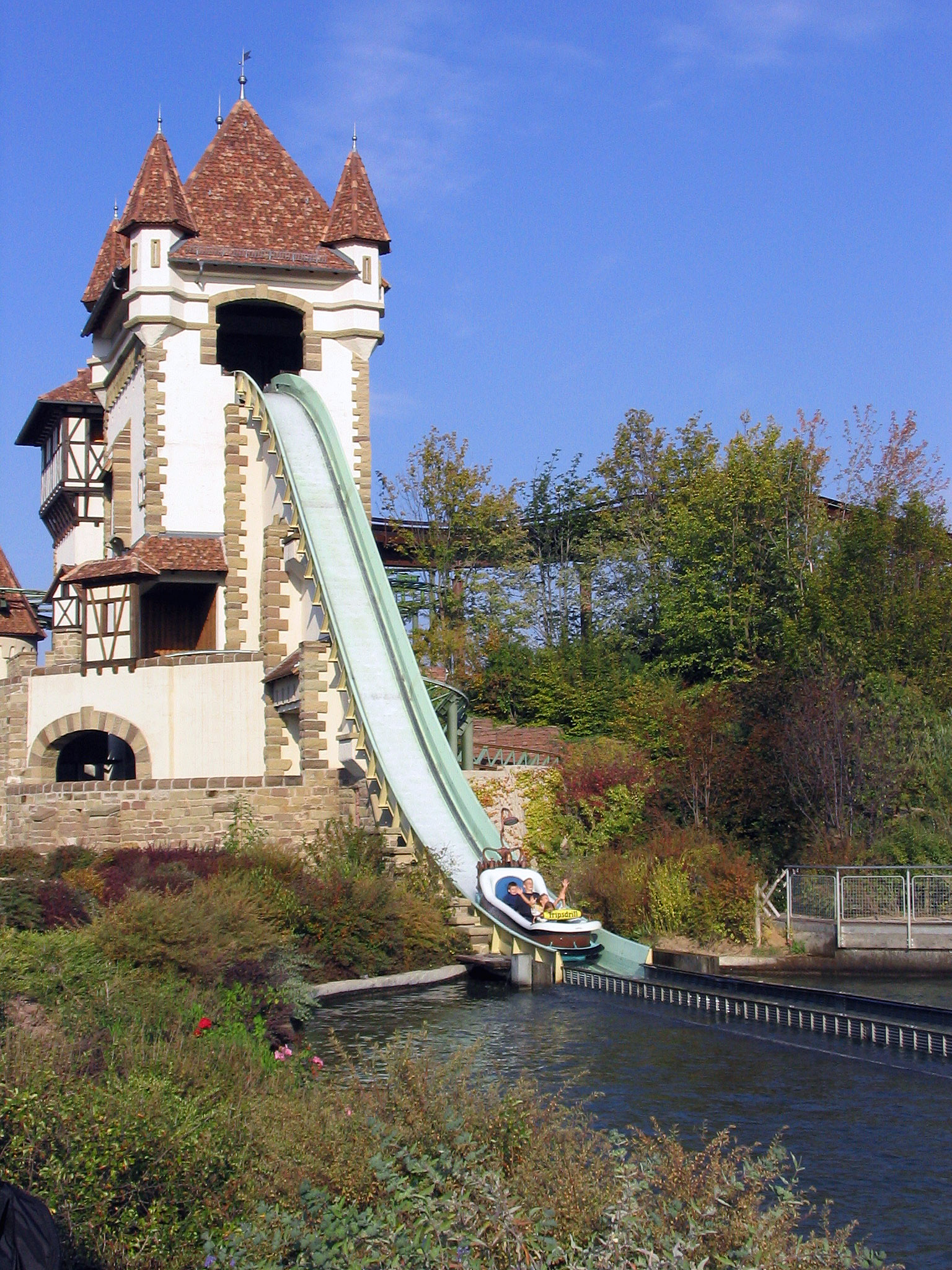
- Bathtub flume ride
- Interactive map of Erlebnispark Tripsdrill
- Location: Cleebronn, Germany
- Coordinates: 49°02′07″N 09°03′09″E
- Opened: 1929
- Owner: Fischer family
- Slogan: Mit Liebe gemacht! (Made with love)
- Operating season: theme park: 27 March—7 November; wildlife park: all year
- Attendance: 600.000
- Area: 77 ha (190 acres)
- Website: www.tripsdrill.de

Erlebnispark Tripsdrill is a wildlife and theme park near Cleebronn in Southern Germany. Covering 77 hectares (190 acres) in total, the park offers 29 attractions, including museums, animal petting and feeding, roller coasters, playgrounds, and a theatre. Opened in 1929, it is Germany's oldest amusement park and is still owned and managed by the same family.

== History ==
Eugen Fischer built a windmill on the site in 1929 and opened a restaurant there. He called the mill "Old Women's Mill" and included a slide for playing on. After Eugen's death in the Second World War, his son Kurt carried on the restaurant, expanding the catering to a park. The windmill was destroyed by fire in 1946 following a lightning strike, and rebuilt by Kurt in 1950.

Over the following years attractions were added to the park. In 1957, a zoo opened with approximately 300 animals. A mechanical attraction arrived in 1960 in the form of pedal-driven locomotives. The zoo was transformed into a wildlife park and petting zoo in 1972, which was expanded in 1976 to include over 1,000 animals. The wine museum ‘Vinarium’ contains the largest collection of wood-spindle presses in Germany.

Kurt Fischer handed on the management of the park to his sons Roland, Helmut, and Dieter in 1996, and died on 28 January 2010.

In 2013, the park opened a new launched coaster called Karacho.

For the 2020 season, the park added two new roller coasters by Vekoma. These coasters were Volldampf and Hals-über-Kopf.

== Current park management and attractions ==
Approximately 600,000 people visit Tripsdrill each year and the park employs about 150 people. The theme park area opens from late March to early November, but the wildlife park is open all year. The parking lot directly in front of the main entrance is free of charge.

Originality, attention to detail, and a preference for local building firms and materials is an important emphasis at Tripsdrill. The park was one of the first to install the now-ubiquitous "teacups" ride and its Bathtub Flume Ride is the tallest in Europe.

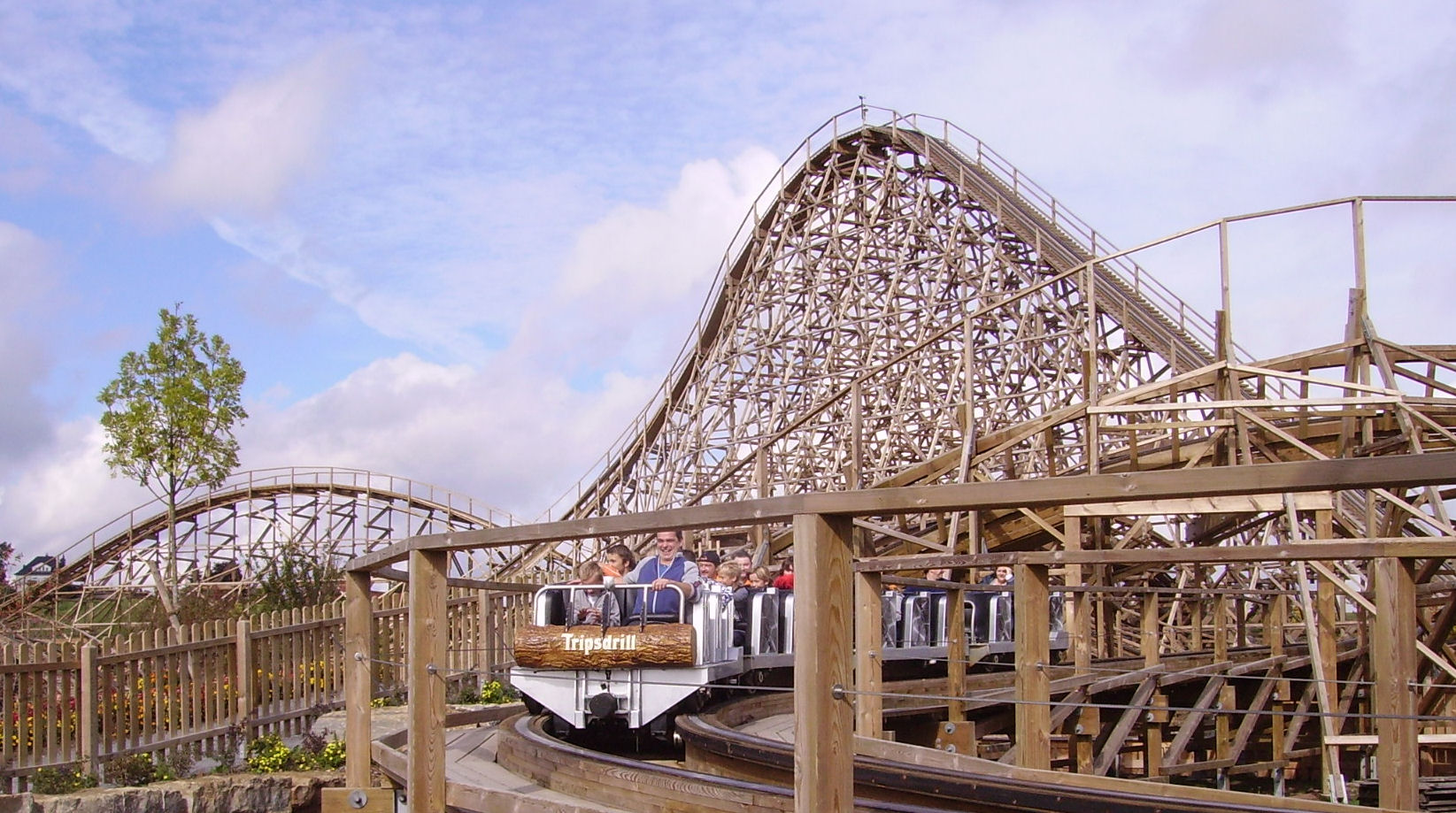
Mammut

The theme of the park is "Schwaben anno 1880" (Swabia in 1880) and many of the attraction are themed to everyday life in those times, like bathing and laundry.

Its largest installation to date, Mammut, built in 2008, is an entirely wooden roller coaster, the first of its kind in Southern Germany, and themed as a sawmill. Nearly 860 metres (2,820 ft) long and costing approximately 6 million euros, the roller coaster was designed by the renowned Ingenieur Büro Stengel GmbH, a design firm founded by Werner Stengel, and responsible for structures such as Millennium Force at Cedar Point and Kingda Ka at Six Flags Great Adventure. In July 2009, extreme in-line skater Dirk Auer travelled the rails of the coaster at speeds of up to 90 kilometres per hour (56 mph), using specially modified skates. The stunt took just over 60 seconds and set a new world record.

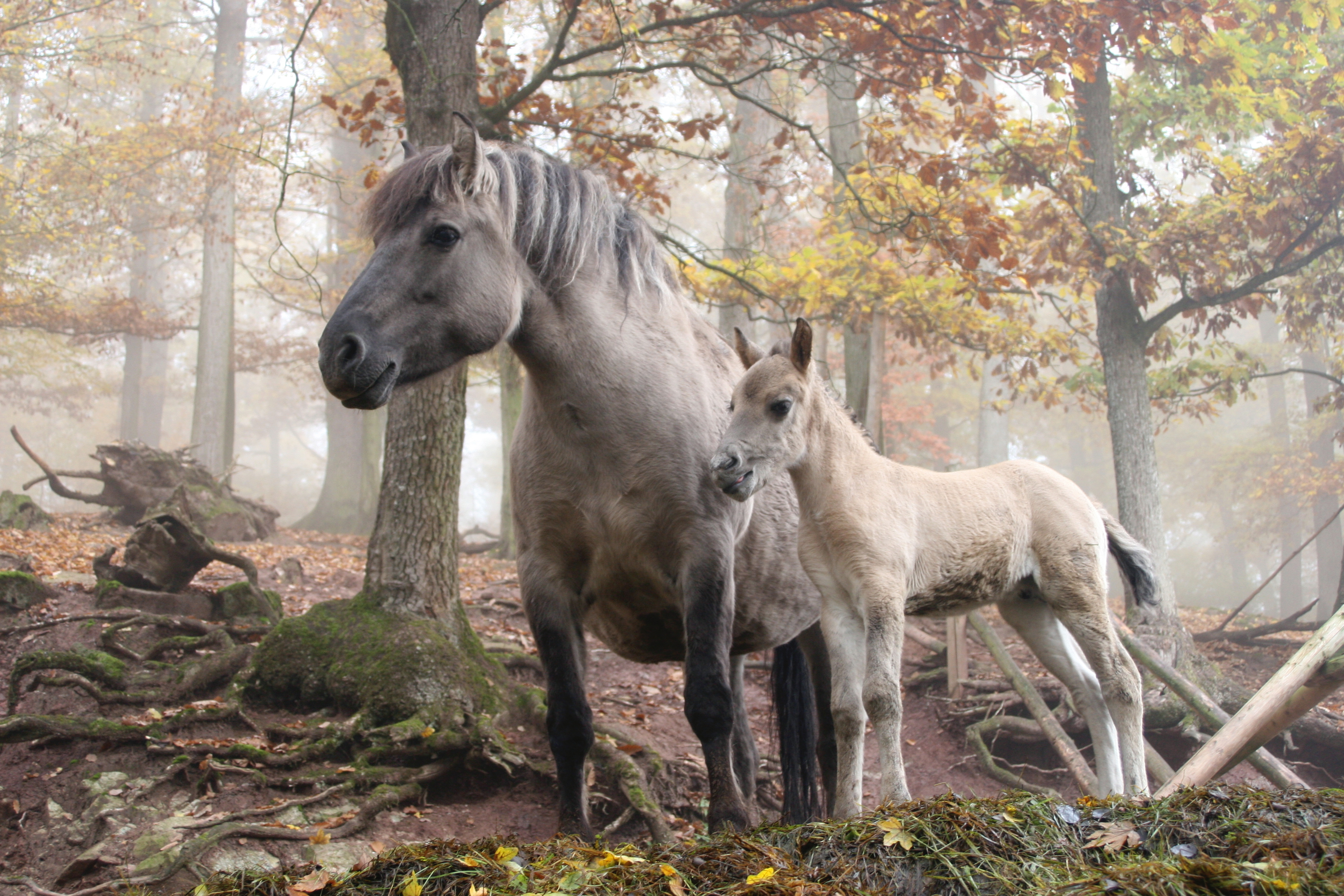
"Wild horses", one of the attractions of the wildlife park

=== Wildlife Park ===
Expanded in 1972 from a petting zoo to 47 hectares (120 acres) dedicated to nature and animals, Tripsdrill's wildlife park looks after 130 animals of various species. Most of the animals can be fed and petted by visitors year-round. As well as "wild horses", the 35 hectares (86 acres) of forests and fields of the wildlife park are home to Arctic wolves, mouflons, fallow deer, raccoons, brown bears, and others. There are falconry demonstrations and feeding viewings, several paths, and a playground area. Entry into the wildlife park is included in admission tickets for the theme park.
