= Alahärmä =

- Former municipality
- Alahärmän kunta Alahärmä kommun
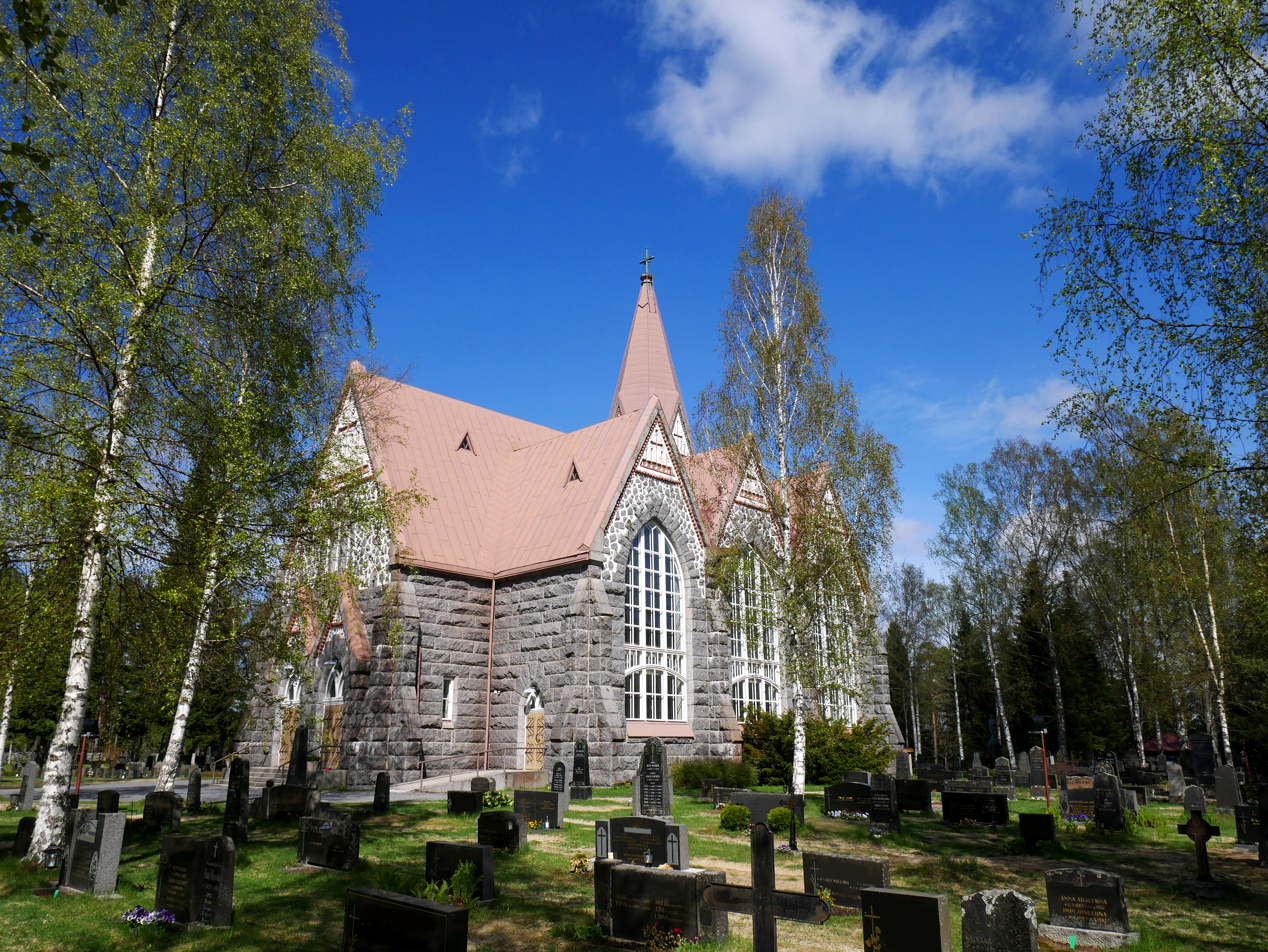
- Alahärmä Church

- Coat of arms

- Location of Alahärmä in Finland
- Interactive map of Alahärmä
- Coordinates: 63°15′N 022°51′E
- Country: Finland
- Region: South Ostrobothnia
- Sub-region: Härmänmaa sub-region
- Founded: 1867
- Consolidated: 2009

Area
  - Total: 353.65 km^{2} (136.55 sq mi)
  - Land: 351.32 km^{2} (135.65 sq mi)
  - Water: 2.33 km^{2} (0.90 sq mi)

Population (2008-12-31)
  - Total: 4,661
  - Density: 13.27/km^{2} (34.36/sq mi)

Population by age
  - 0 to 14: 17.7%
  - 15 to 64: 62.1%
  - 65 or older: 20.2%
- Time zone: UTC+2 (EET)
  - Summer (DST): UTC+3 (EEST)

Alahärmä is a former municipality of Finland. It was consolidated, together with Kortesjärvi and Ylihärmä, to Kauhava on 1 January 2009.

Alahärmä is located in the province of Western Finland and is part of the South Ostrobothnia region. The municipality had a population of 4,661 (as of 31 December 2008) and covered a land area of 351.32 square kilometres (135.65 sq mi). The population density was 13.27 inhabitants per square kilometre (34.4/sq mi).

Alahärmä stands in connection with the Gulf of Bothnia by the Lapuanjoki river. The municipality, situated 80 kilometres (50 mi) northeast of the town Vaasa, is dominated by the countryside and nature, but there are also small villages filled with activities. The companies are mainly within the metal industry, fur-farming, starch and milk production. The unemployment rate is one of the lowest in Finland.

There is also a supply of cultural activities for instance the annual folk festival "Härmälääset Häjyylyt", theatre, art exhibitions, concerts. The local greystone church was built in 1903.

Alahärmä is also the home of the northernmost wooden rollercoaster in the world, named Thunderbird at PowerPark resort and amusement park. The resort area also has hotels, camping area, restaurants, the largest indoor go-kart track in Europe and The Mika Salo Circuit outdoor go-kart track (designed by Mika Salo)

The municipality, which is unilingually Finnish, abuts areas in Ostrobothnia with mixed Swedish and Finnish speaking population.

== Villages ==
Ekola, Hakola, Hanhila, Hanhimäki, Hilli, Huhtamäki, Kennetti, Kirkonkylä, Kivihuhta, Kojola, Kuoppala, Köykkäri, Lahdenkylä, Ojala, Poromaa, Pelkkala, Perkiömäki, Pesola, Vakkuri, Voltti, Yliviitala

== Gallery ==
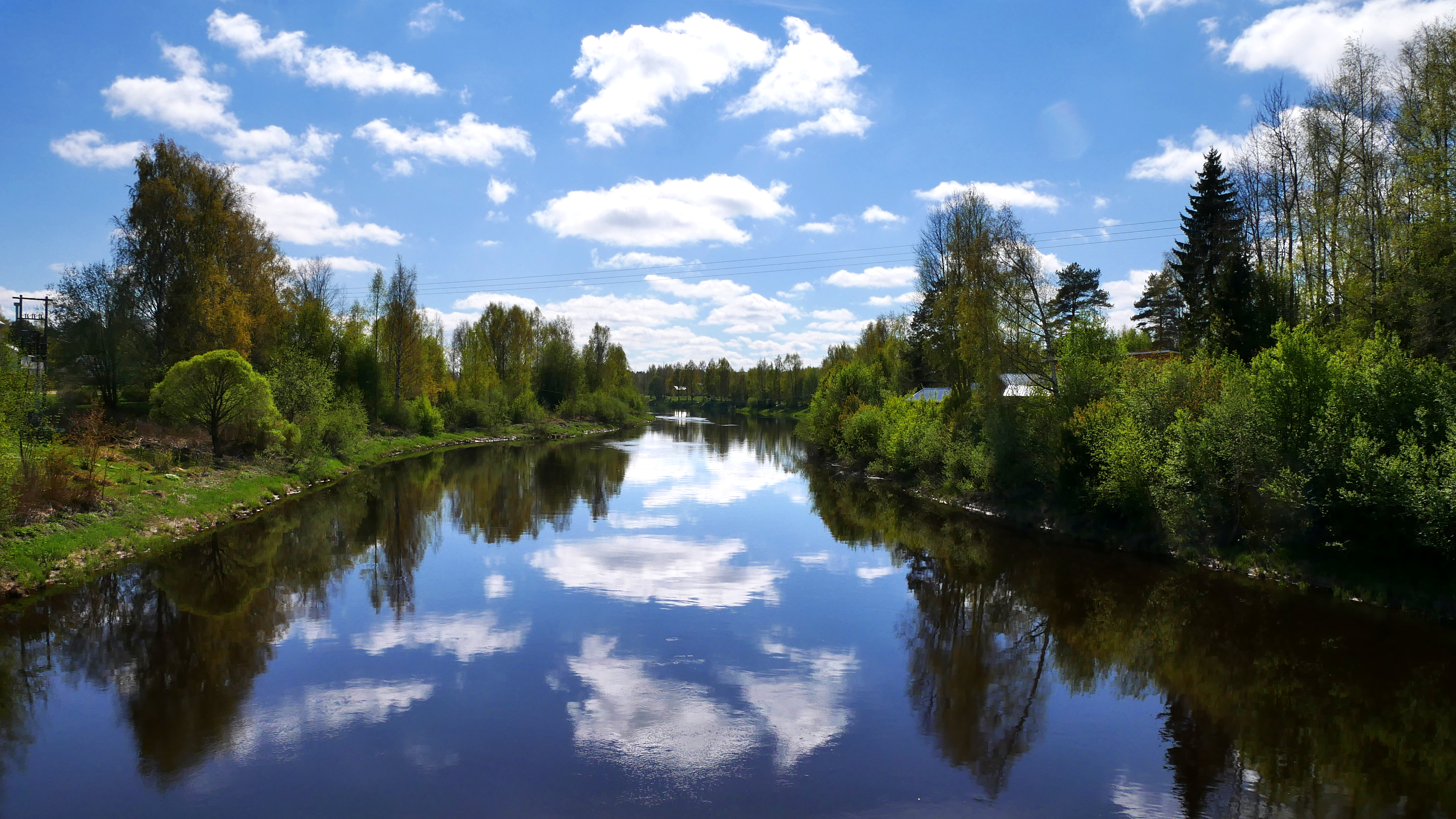
The Lapuanjoki river flows by Alahärmä

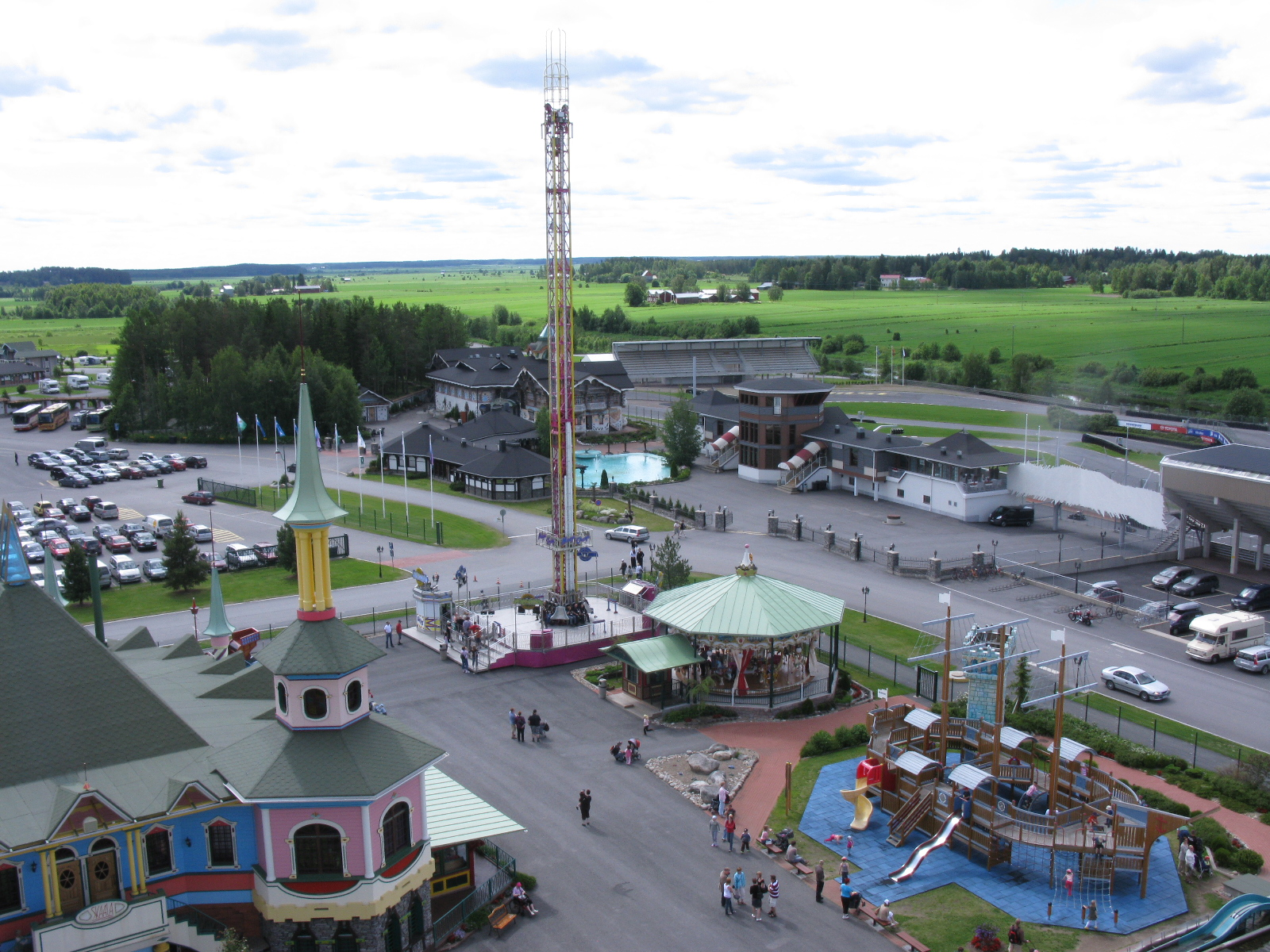
PowerPark amusement park in Alahärmä

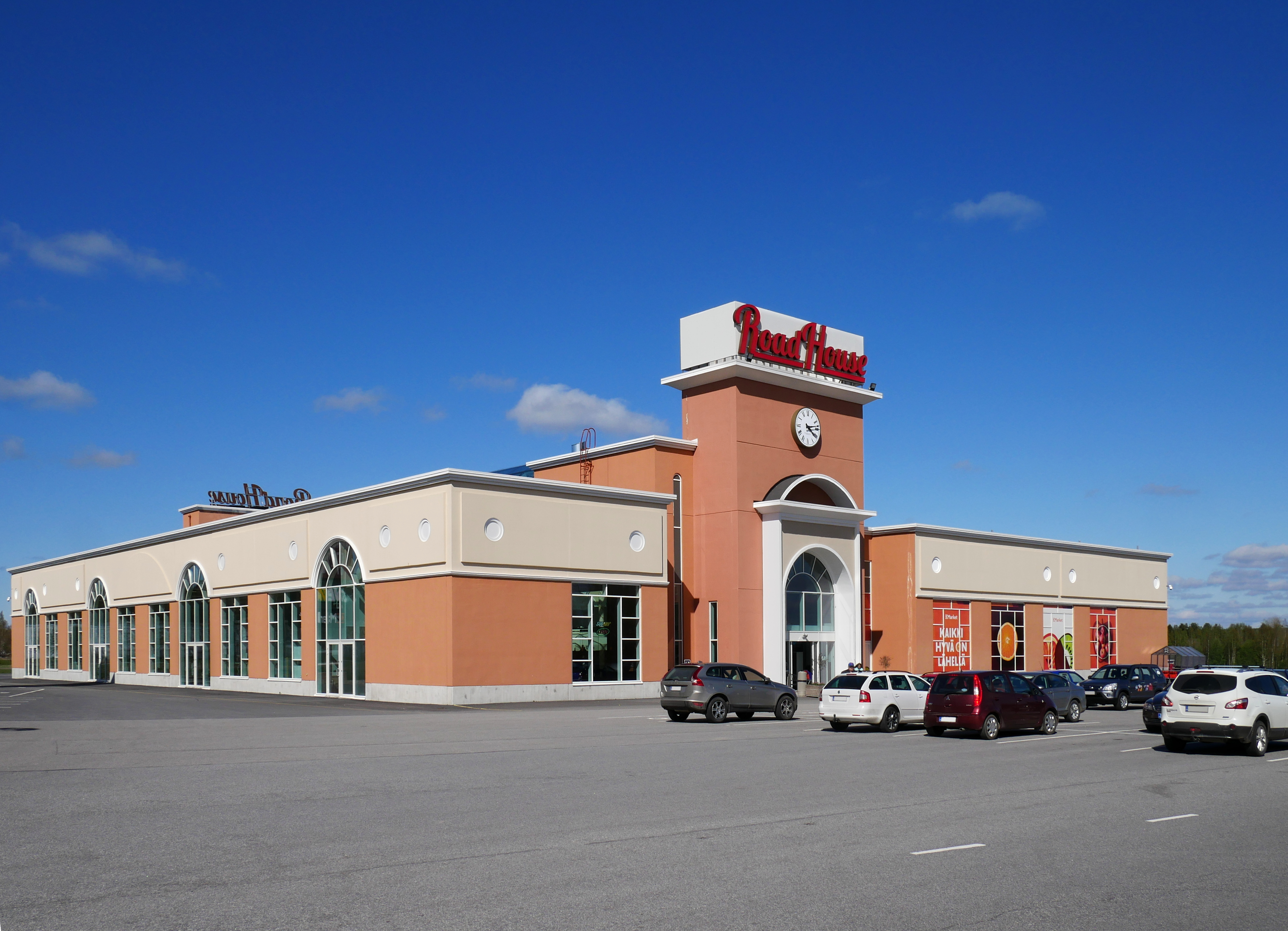
RoadHouse shopping mall near PowerPark
