= E&F Miler Industries =

Roller coaster manufacturer

- Type: Private
- Industry: Roller coaster manufacturing
- Predecessor: Miler Manufacturing; Miler Coaster, Inc.
- Founded: Portland, Oregon, United States (late 1940s)
- Founder: Carl Miler
- Headquarters: Portland, Oregon, United States
- Area served: North America
- Key people: Fred Miler, Eric Miler
- Owner: Fred Miler
- Website: www.miler-ind.com

E&F Miler Industries (formerly Miler Coaster, Inc. and Miler Manufacturing) is a family-owned roller coaster manufacturing firm based in Portland, Oregon, United States. The company specialises in smaller children's roller coasters; however, it has manufactured some larger family roller coasters in the past.

== History ==
In the late 1940s Carl Miler founded Miler Manufacturing. The company built a variety steel roller coasters aimed at children and families such as Wild Mouse roller coasters. Miler Manufacturing roller coasters were popular in the 1950s. Production of new roller coasters by Miler Manufacturing stopped in the mid 1970s.

Carl Miler's son, Fred Miler, reopened Miler Manufacturing in 1989. The company changed its name to Miler Coaster, Inc. in 1992 when its first new roller coaster was built. The company's name was later changed to E&F Miler Industries. As of 2013, Fred Miler operates the company with his son, Eric Miler.

== List of roller coasters ==
As of 2019, E&F Miler Industries have manufactured a total of 58 roller coasters which have operated at 89 different locations. Under the Miler Manufacturing name they have manufactured a total of 30 roller coasters which have operated at 38 different locations. Aside from installing new roller coasters, E&F Miler Industries has performed work on restoring some of Miler Manufacturing's original rides. The majority of the company's contracts come from the International Association of Amusement Parks and Attractions' (IAAPA) annual trade show.

=== E&F Miler Industries / Miler Coaster, Inc. ===
Name	Model	Park	Country	Opened	Status	Ref
Great Pumpkin Coaster; Formerly Little Bill's Giggle Coaster; Formerly Top Cat's Taxi Jam; Formerly Scooby Zoom	Family Coaster / Oval	Kings Island	United States	1992	Operating	
Dare Devil	Family Coaster / Single Helix Center - CW - Custom	Boomers Family Fun Center	United States	1993	Removed	
Thriller	Family Coaster / Oval	Land of Make Believe	United States	1994	Operating	
Freeway Coaster	Family Coaster / 16 ft Outside Spiral CW	Adventure City	United States	1994	Operating	
Great Chase; Formerly Rolling Thunder	Family Coaster / 16 ft Outside Spiral CCW	Six Flags New England	United States	1996	Operating	
Big Timber Log Ride	Water Coaster / Big Timber	Enchanted Forest	United States	1996	Operating	
Bear Trax	Family Coaster / 16 ft Outside Spiral CW	Seabreeze	United States	1997	Operating	
Great Pumpkin Coaster; Formerly Taxi Jam	Family Coaster / Oval	Kings Dominion	United States	1997	Operating	
Wilderness Run; Formerly Lucy's Crabbie Cabbie; Formerly Hey Arnold's Taxi Chase; Formerly Taxi Jam	Family Coaster / 16 ft Oval w/helix on left	Carowinds	United States	1998	Operating	
Taxi Jam	Family Coaster / Oval	Canada's Wonderland	Canada	1998	Operating	
Sea Serpent	Family Coaster / 16 ft Outside Spiral CW	Keansburg Amusement Park	United States	1998	Operating	
Lucy's Crabbie Cabbies; Formerly Taxi Jam	Unknown	California's Great America	United States	1999	Operating	
Zoooooom	Family Coaster / 16 ft OVal w/helix on right	Oaks Amusement Park	United States	1999	Operating	
Canyon Blaster	Family Coaster / 16 ft Oval w/helix on left	Six Flags Magic Mountain	United States	1999	Operating	
Sea Serpent	Unknown	Deno's Wonder Wheel Amusement Park	United States	1999	Operating	
Ravine Flyer 3	Family Coaster / Custom	Waldameer & Water World	United States	2000	Operating	
Little Titans	Family Coaster / 16 ft Oval w/helix on right	Mt. Olympus Water & Theme Park	United States	2000	Operating	
Sea Serpent	Unknown	Santa Cruz Beach Boardwalk	United States	2000	Operating	
Diamond Mine Run	Family Coaster / 16 ft Outside Spiral CCW	Magic Springs & Crystal Falls	United States	2000	Operating	
Boa Squeeze	Family Coaster / 11.5 ft Single Helix Center - CCW	WonderPark	Puerto Rico	2000	Removed	
Bubbles The Coaster	Family Coaster / 16 ft Oval w/helix on left	Storybook Land	United States	2000	Operating	
Boa Squeeze	Family Coaster / 11.5 ft Single Helix Center - CCW	WonderPark	Puerto Rico	2001	Removed	
Star Jet	Hi-Miler / 52 ft	Casino Pier	United States	2002	Removed	
Dive to Atlantis	Water Coaster / Dive to Atlantis	Mt. Olympus Water & Theme Park	United States	2004	Removed	
Kettle Creek Mine	Family Coaster / 16 ft Outside Spiral CCW	Playland	Canada	2004	Operating	
Funtown Family Coaster	Family Coaster / 20 ft Twin Outside Helix	Funtown Pier	United States	2004	Removed	
Python; Formerly Python Pit	Family Coaster / 11.5 ft Single Helix Center - CCW	Spring Park; Nashville Valley Amusement Park; Jeepers	United States	2005; 2003 to 2004; 1998 to 2003	Operating	
Miner Coaster	Family Coaster / 20 ft Miner Coaster	Western Playland	United States	2006	Operating	
Python Pit	Family Coaster / 11.5 ft Single Helix Center - CCW	Go-Karts Plus; Jeepers; Jeepers	United States	2007; 2004 to 2005; 1998 to 2004	Operating	
Scream'n Eagle; Formerly Wildcat	Hi-Miler / 38 ft	Fun Spot America Atlanta; Wild Island	United States	2007; 2002 to 2006	Operating	
Kozmo's Kurves	Family Coaster / 20 ft Coaster Kozmo's Kurves	Knoebels Amusement Resort	United States	2009	Operating	
Roller Coaster; Formerly Midnight Express; Formerly Haunted Roller Coaster; Formerly Python Pit	Family Coaster / 11.5 ft Single Helix Center - CW	Country Mercantile; Krazy City; Jeepers	United States	2010; 2006 to 2009; 1998 to 2006	Operating	
Pacific Fruit Express	Family Coaster / 16 ft Outside Spiral CCW	Happy Hollow Park & Zoo	United States	2010	Operating	
Loco Loco; Formerly Harvest Express Coaster	Family Coaster / 24 ft Harvest Express	Blue Bayou Dixie Landin'; Nut Tree Park	United States	2010; 2006 to 2008	Removed	
Kiddie Coaster; Formerly Boa Squeeze	Family Coaster / 11.5 ft Single Helix Center - CCW	Fun Spot America Kissimmee; Enchanted Forest; Wonderpark	United States	2012; 2010 to 2011; 2001 to 2008	Operating	
Mine-Twister; Formerly Python Pit	Family Coaster / 11.5 ft Single elix Center - CW	Remlinger Farms; Jeepers; Jeepers	United States	2012; 2007 to 2012; 1997 to 2006	Operating	
Corona Cobra Coaster; Formerly Python Pit	Family Coaster / 11.5 ft Single Helix Center - CW	Fantasy Forest at the Flushing Meadows Carousel; Jeepers	United States	2013; 1999 to 2012	Operating	
Sea Serpent	Family Coaster / Oval	Fun Spot America Orlando; Playland's Castaway Cove	United States	2013; 1997 to 2012	Operating	
Blazin' Buckaroo; Formerly Marvel Mania	Family Coaster / 16 ft Outside Spiral CCW	Elitch Gardens; Alabama Splash Adventure	United States	2013; 1998 to 2011	Operating	
Pirates Gold Rush	Unknown	Playland's Castaway Cove	United States	2013	Operating	
Python Pit	Family Coaster / 11.5 ft Single Helix Center - CCW	PowerPlay Family Entertainment Center; Jeepers	United States	2014; 1999 to 2000	Operating	
Python Pit; Formerly Haunted Roller Coaster	Family Coaster / 11.5 ft Single Helix Center - CCW	Story Book Park; Laugh Out Loud Stations	Canada	2014; 1996 to 2009	Operating	
Coaster; Formerly Dragon	Family Coaster / Oval	Blackbeard's Family Entertainment Center; Peter Piper Pizza	United States	2014; 2001 to 2009	Operating	
Verrazano Viper; Formerly Sea Serpent; Formerly Python Pit	Family Coaster / Oval	Fantasy Shore Amusement Park; That Fun Place; Jeepers	United States	2014; 2008 to 2012; 1996 to 2007	Removed	
Toronto Island Mine Coaster	Family Coaster / 16 ft Outside Spiral CCW	Centreville Amusement Park	Canada	2014	Operating	
Sparetime Express; Formerly Python Pit	Family Coaster / 11.5 ft Single Helix Center - CCW	Neb's Funworld; Jeepers	Canada	2015; 1996 to 2007	Operating	
Crazy Dane Coaster; Formerly Wild Mouse	Wild Mouse / Wild Mouse	Scandia Family Fun Center; Casino Pier	United States	2015; 1999 to 2012	Operating	
Mine Train	Unknown	Sonoma TrainTown Railroad	United States	2015	Operating	
Python Pit	Family Coaster / 11.5 ft Single Helix Center - CCW	Jeepers; Jeepers	United States	2016; 1998 to 2015	Operating	
Python Pit	Family Coaster / 11.5 ft Single Helix Center - CW	Fast Lane Entertainment; Zonkers	United States	2016; 1997 to 2015	Operating	
Wild Waves	Unknown	Playland's Castaway Cove	United States	2017	Operating	
Dragon Coaster; Formerly Python Roller Coaster; Formerly Python Pit	Family Coaster / 11.5 ft Single Helix Center - CCW	Castle Fun Center; Party Zone USA; Jeepers	United States	2018; 2011 to 2017; 1997 to 2010	Operating	
Intrépide; Formerly Gold Rush Express	Family Coaster / 20 ft Twin Outside Helix	Pays des Merveilles; Fort Jefferson Fun Park	Canada	2019; 2005 to 2015	Operating	
Kiddie Coaster; Formerly Python Pit Roller Coaster; Formerly Python Pit	Family Coaster / 11.5 ft Single Helix Center - CCW	Fun Spot America Atlanta; Heritage Amusement Park; Jeepers; Jeepers	United States	2019; 2007 to 2018; 2000 to 2006; 1999	Operating	
Hurricane; Formerly Viking Voyage; Formerly Jack Rabbit	Hi-Miler / 52 ft	Fun Spot America Kissimmee; Fun Spot America Atlanta; Wild Adventures; Celebration City	United States	2019; 2019; 2010 to 2018; 2003 to 2008	Operating	
Kersplash	Water Coaster / Kersplash	Edaville Family Theme Park; Washington State Fair	United States	Unknown; 1995 to 2012	Closed	
Serial Serpent; Formerly Python Pit	Family Coaster / 11.5 ft Single Helix Center - CCW	Funtimes Fun Park; Go Bananas	United States	2021; 1997 to 2020	Operating	
Prairie Screamer; Formerly Screamer	Hi-Miler / 88 ft Scandia Screamer	Traders Village; Scandia Amusement Park	United States	2022; 1995 to 2019	Operating	

=== Miler Manufacturing ===
Name	Model	Park	Country	Opened	Status	Ref
Rolling Thunder	Unknown	Tahoe Amusement Park	United States	Unknown	Removed	
Kiddie Coaster	Unknown	Lakeside Amusement Park	United States	Unknown	Operating	
Kiddie Coaster	Unknown	Como Town	United States	Unknown	Removed	
Little Dipper	Unknown	Castle Amusement Park	United States	Unknown	Operating	
Unknown	Unknown	Six Gun Territory	United States	Unknown	Removed	
Unknown	Unknown	Los Angeles County Fairgrounds; Cal Expo Amusement Park	United States	Unknown; 1975	Removed	
Kiddy Roller Coaster; Formerly Pocono Lightning	Unknown	Moss Hollow Creek Family Park; Pocono Play Park	United States	Unknown; 2008; 1999 to 2005	Removed	
Unknown	Unknown	Playland at the Beach	United States	Unknown	Removed	
Unknown	Unknown	Playland	Canada	Unknown	Removed	
Roller Coaster	Unknown	Fairyland Park	United States	Unknown	Removed	
Roller Coaster	Unknown	Funderland Amusement Park	United States	1940	Removed	
Unknown	Unknown	Playland Pier	United States	1942	Removed	
Kiddie Dipper	Unknown	Jantzen Beach Amusement Park	United States	1947	Removed	
Roller Coaster	Unknown	Police Benevolent Association Park	United States	1952	Removed	
Unknown	Unknown	Gayway	United States	1953	Removed	
Wild Chipmunk	Wild Mouse	Lakeside Amusement Park	United States	1955	Operating	
Mini Coaster	Unknown	Dorney Park	United States	1957	Removed	
World's Largest Portable Roller Coaster	World's Largest Portable Roller Coaster	Playland at the Beach	United States	1960	Removed	
Cyclone; Formerly Wild Mouse	Wild Mouse	Wonderland Park; Funtown; Springlake Park	United States	1968; 1961 to 1966; 1960	Operating	
Hi-Miler	Hi-Miler	Playland at the Beach	United States	1971	Removed	
Roller Coaster	Unknown	Fun Town at Micke Grove	United States	1972	Operating	
Kiddie Coaster; Formerly Roller Coaster	Unknown	Williams Grove Amusement Park; Fantasy Farm Amusement Park	United States	1992; 1963 to 1991	Removed	
Mine Twister	Unknown	Remlinger Farms	United States	1996	Removed	
Roller Coaster	Unknown	Blackbeard's Family Entertainment Center	United States	1998	Removed	
Tree Top Racers	Wild Mouse	Adventure City	United States	1999	Removed	
Rolling Thunder	Unknown	Funtrackers	United States	2000	Removed	
Montaña Rusa	Unknown	Jalisco Park	Cuba	2000	Removed	
Little Coaster	Unknown	Arnolds Park	United States	2002	Operating	
Mighty Mouse	Wild Mouse	Funtown Pier; Playland's Castaway Cove	United States	2005; 1996 to 2004	Removed	
Dipsy Doodle	Unknown	Joyland Amusement Park	United States	2005	Removed	
Gravity Roller Coaster; Formerly Peachtree Express	World's Largest Portable Roller Coaster	Schnepf Farms	United States	2007	Operating	
Santa's Runaway Sleigh	Unknown	Yesterland Farm	United States	2009	Operating	
Tumbleweed; Formerly Sea Serpent	Unknown	Adventure Park USA; Jolly Roger Amusement Park	United States	2015	Operating	
Sea Serpent	Unknown	Jolly Roger Amusement Park	United States	2015	Operating	
Unknown	Unknown	Dell'Osso Family Farm	United States	2015	Removed	
Roller Coaster	Unknown	Hovatter's Wildlife Zoo	United States	2018	Operating	
Roller Coaster	Unknown	Marleybrook Funfair	United Kingdom	2019	Operating	

== Gallery ==
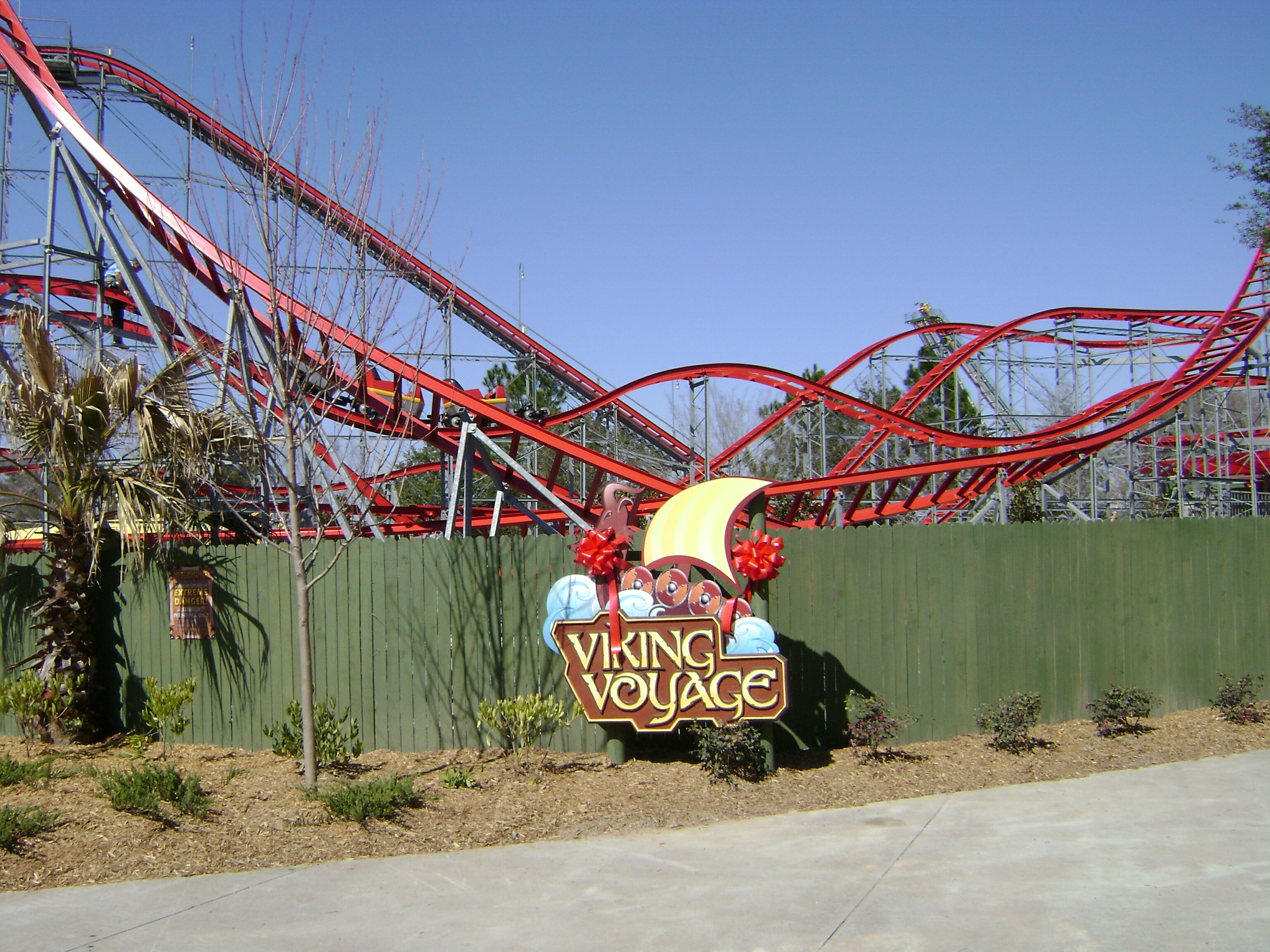
Viking Voyage at Wild Adventures

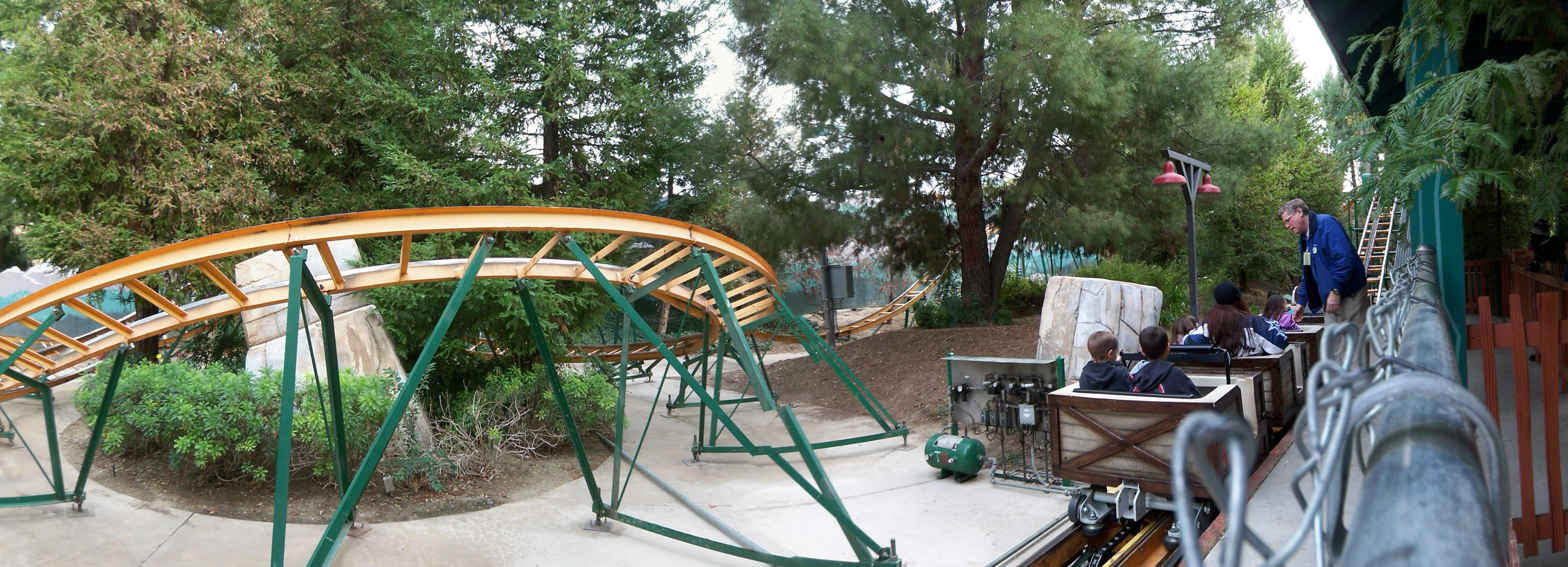
Canyon Blaster at Six Flags Magic Mountain

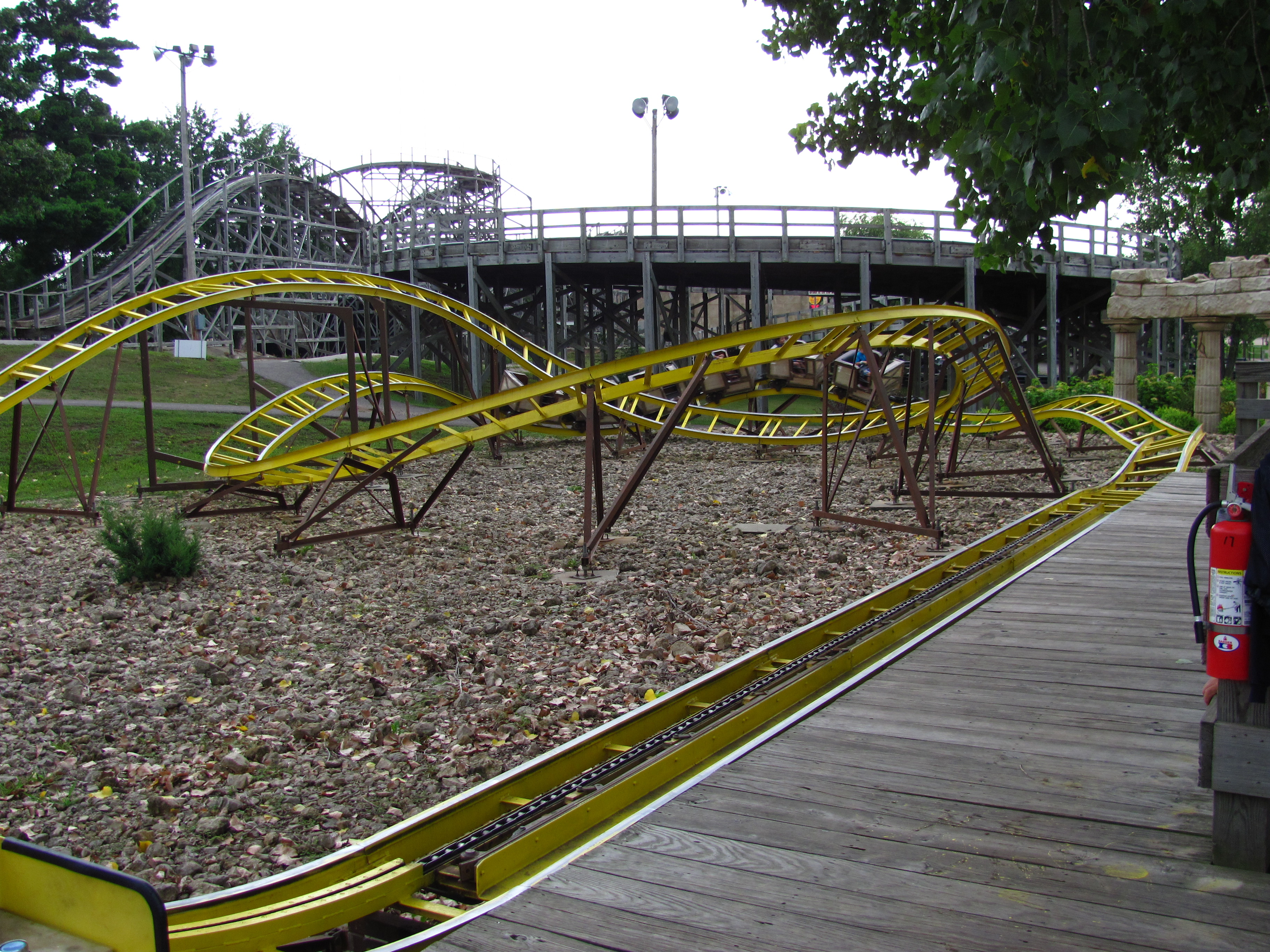
Little Titans at Mt. Olympus Water & Theme Park

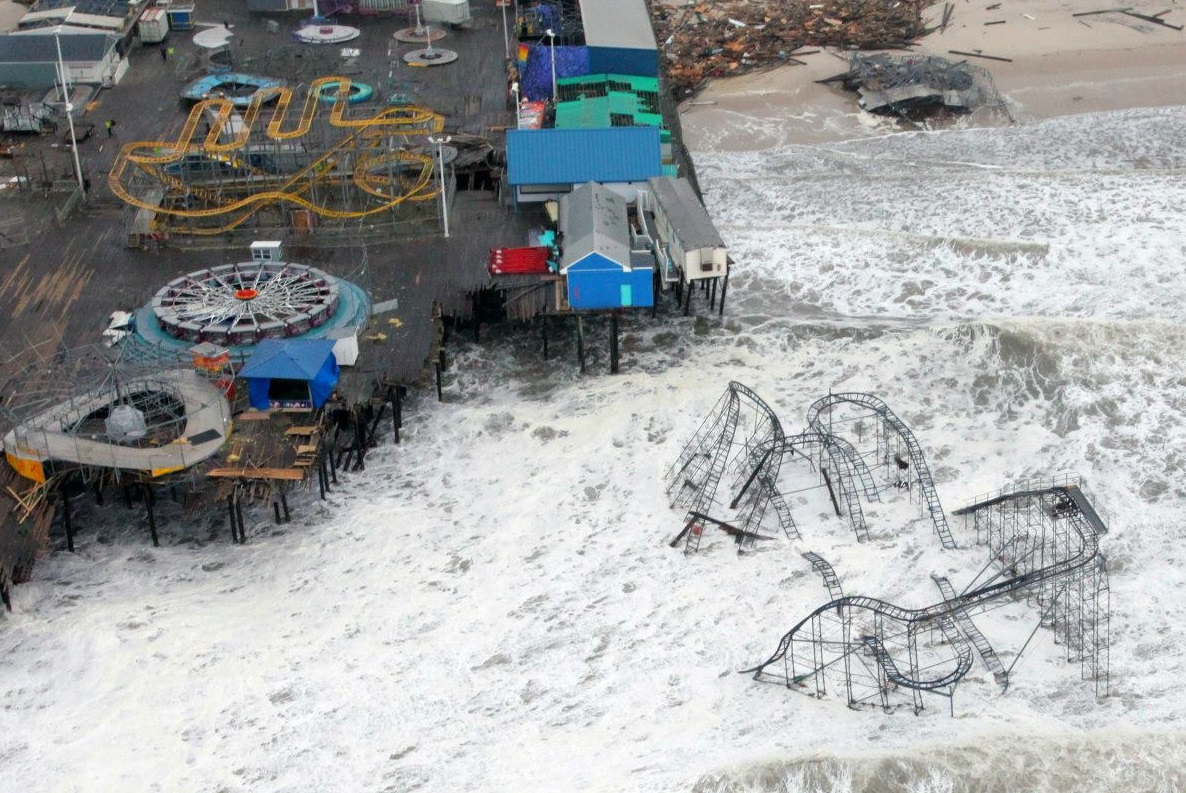
Casino Pier's Wild Mouse (left) and Star Jet (right) following part of the pier's destruction by Hurricane Sandy in 2012

== See also ==
- List of companies based in Oregon
