= Hydrus (roller coaster) =

Steel roller coaster in New Jersey

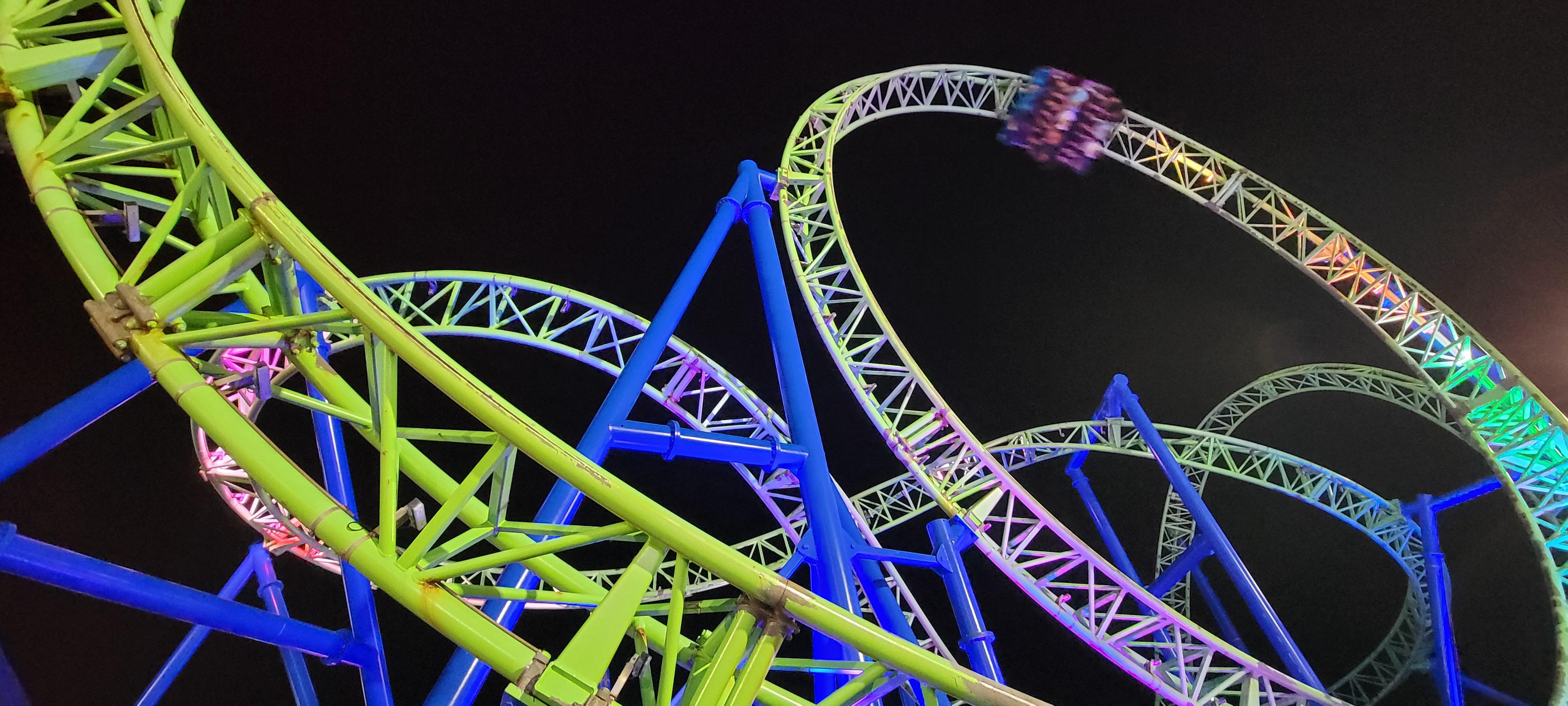
- Hydrus at night

Casino Pier
- Location: Casino Pier
- Coordinates: 39.942784°N 74.072083°W
- Status: Operating
- Soft opening date: May 6, 2017
- Opening date: May 26, 2017
- Replaced: Star Jet

General statistics
- Type: Steel – Euro-Fighter
- Manufacturer: Gerstlauer
- Designer: Werner Stengel
- Model: 320
- Height: 72 ft (22 m)
- Drop: 70 ft (21 m)
- Length: 1,050 ft (320 m)
- Speed: 45 mph (72 km/h)
- Inversions: 3
- Max vertical angle: 97°
- Trains: 2 trains with a single car. Riders are arranged 4 across in 2 rows for a total of 8 riders per train.
- Hydrus at RCDB

Video

Hydrus is a steel roller coaster at Casino Pier in Seaside Heights, New Jersey. Opened in 2017, it was the sixth Gerstlauer Euro-Fighter roller coaster to open in the United States and the first Euro-Fighter 320 model in the world. It replaced Star Jet, which was destroyed by Hurricane Sandy in 2012.

== History ==
After the Star Jet roller coaster was destroyed (along with a large portion of the Casino Pier) during Hurricane Sandy in 2012, it took almost three years until permission was granted to rebuild; this permission to rebuild included a new roller coaster. After swapping land with the city, however, it was decided that this new coaster would not be built on the pier over the water (as the 1970 Jet Star and the 2002 Star Jet had been), but it would instead be built over the beach to prevent a repeat of what had happened with the hurricane.

In late 2016, it was announced that the roller coaster replacing Star Jet would be a Euro-Fighter manufactured by Gerstlauer. The coaster was named Hydrus and opened in May 2017. New Jersey governor Chris Christie was present for a ribbon-cutting ceremony on May 26 which occurred several weeks after a soft opening of the ride.

== Layout and theme ==
Hydrus has the characteristic steeper-than-vertical (97 degree) drop of all Euro-Fighter coasters. The coaster (a Euro-Fighter 320) is similar to 320+ model Euro-Fighters, but it eliminates the final helix at the end. Elements include a loop, cutback, and heartline roll. There are two eight-person cars, each with lap-bar restraints. The owners of Casino Pier have said that the name Hydrus references the constellation of the same name, and the "Jet Star" and later "Star Jet" names of the previous Casino Pier coasters.

== Reception ==
The coaster has been included in rankings of top 2017 coasters from CNN and USA Today.
