= Zeus (roller coaster) =

Roller coaster at Mt. Olympus Water and Theme Park Resort

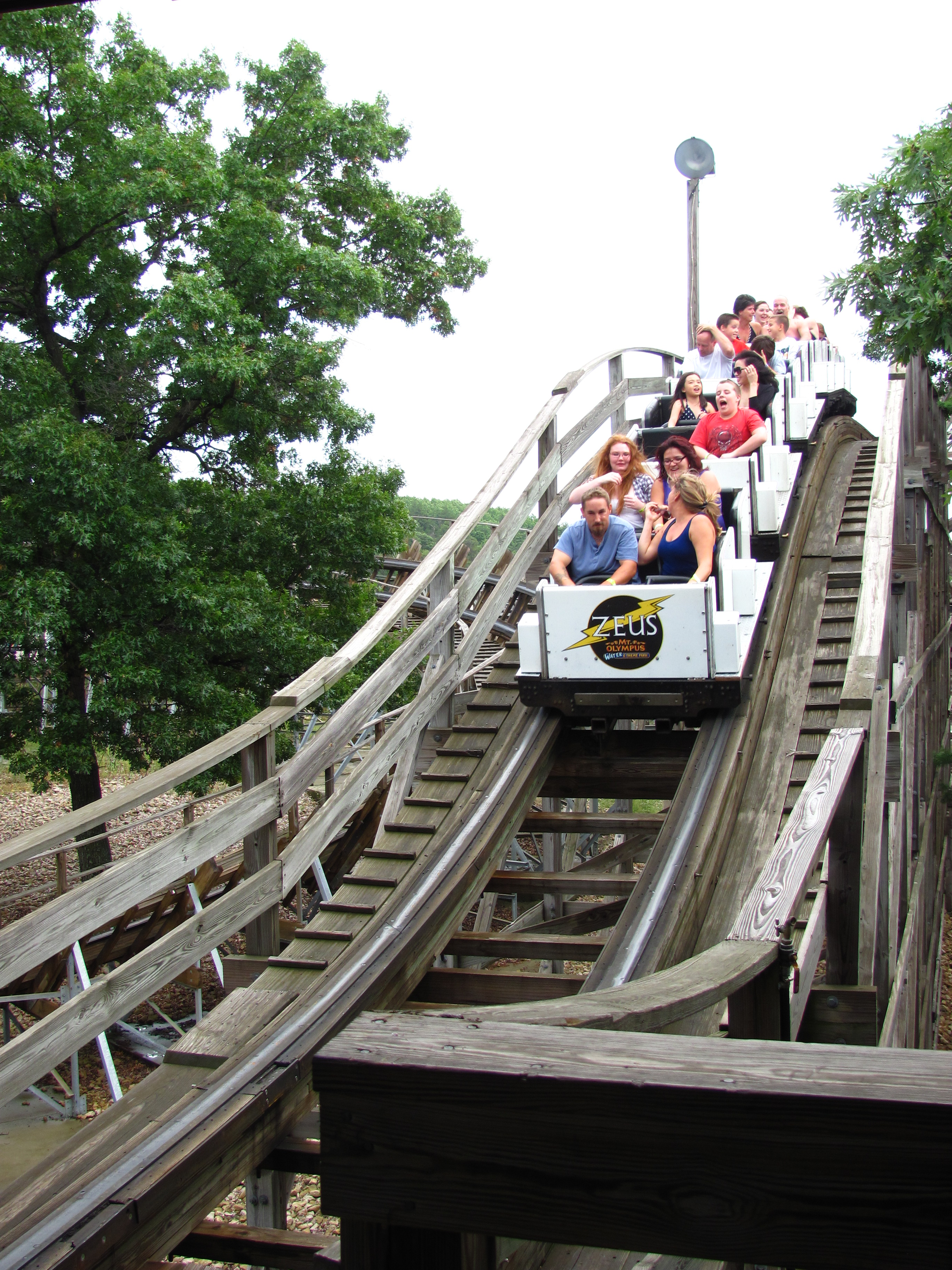
- The ride in 2011

Mt. Olympus Water & Theme Park Resort
- Location: Mt. Olympus Water & Theme Park Resort
- Coordinates: 43°37′00″N 89°47′21″W
- Status: Operating
- Opening date: June 7, 1997

General statistics
- Type: Wood
- Manufacturer: Custom Coasters International
- Lift/launch system: Chain lift hill
- Height: 90 ft (27 m)
- Drop: 85 ft (26 m)
- Length: 2,900 ft (880 m)
- Speed: 60 mph (97 km/h)
- Duration: 1:25
- Height restriction: 48 in (122 cm)
- Trains: Single train with 5 cars; riders arranged 2 across in 2 rows for a total of 20 riders per train
- Zeus at RCDB

Zeus is a wooden roller coaster located at Mt. Olympus Water & Theme Park Resort in Wisconsin Dells, Wisconsin. The ride was built by Custom Coasters International and opened in 1997, the third ride in the park to be built by the manufacturer. It is 90 feet (27 m) tall, and has top speeds of 60 mph (97 km/h). The ride operates with a single train built by Philadelphia Toboggan Coasters.

== Ride experience ==
The train turns 180 degrees out of the station and ascends the 90 foot (27 m) lift hill. At the top of the hill, the train traverses a lefthand turn and drops 85 feet (26 m). A series of close-to-the-ground airtime hills take the ride under the lift hill of the nearby Hades 360 roller coaster, and out to the back of the park. A turnaround places the track parallel to the first set of airtime hills. A final set of airtime hills and a right hand turn bring the train back to the station.
