= Pegasus (Mt. Olympus Water & Theme Park Resort) =

Roller coaster at Mt. Olympus Water & Theme Park Resort

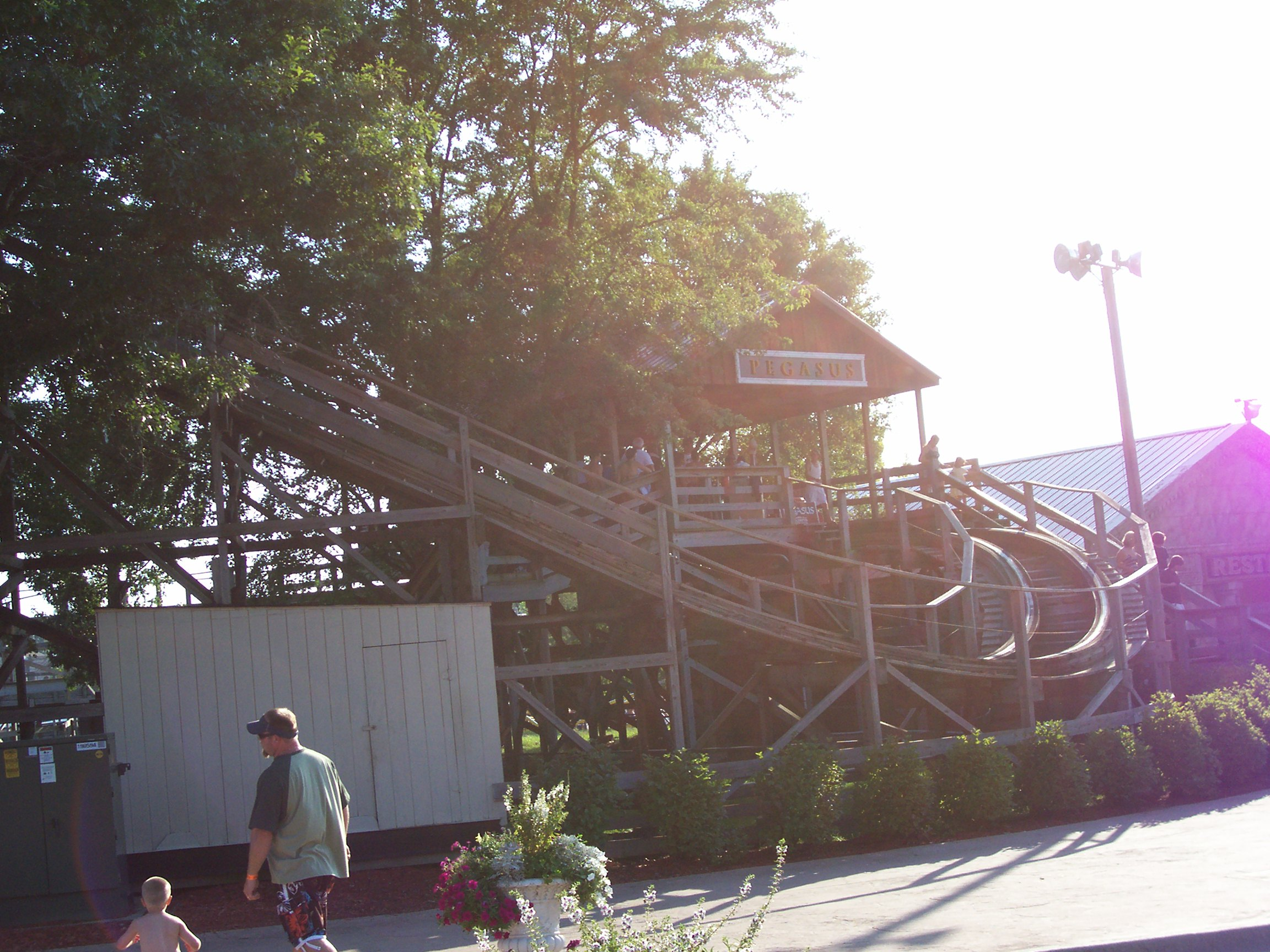

Mt. Olympus Water & Theme Park Resort
- Location: Mt. Olympus Water & Theme Park Resort
- Coordinates: 43.613979°N 89.789846°W
- Status: Operating
- Opening date: 1996

General statistics
- Type: Wood
- Manufacturer: Custom Coasters International
- Lift/launch system: Chain lift hill
- Height: 60 ft (18 m)
- Drop: 45 ft (14 m)
- Length: 1,600 ft (490 m)
- Speed: 40 mph (64 km/h)
- Max vertical angle: 50°
- Height restriction: 40 in (102 cm)
- Trains: Single train with 4 cars; riders arranged 2 across in 2 rows for a total of 16 riders per train
- Pegasus at RCDB

Pegasus is a wooden roller coaster located at Mt. Olympus Water & Theme Park Resort in Wisconsin Dells, Wisconsin. The coaster was built by Custom Coasters International, and its train was built by Philadelphia Toboggan Coasters.

The ride opened in 1996, and was the second roller coaster built by Custom Coasters International at the park. It is 60 feet (18 m) tall, with a drop of 45 feet (14 m) and top speeds of 40 mph (64 km/h).
