= Star Jet =

Roller coaster at Casino Pier in New Jersey, U.S.

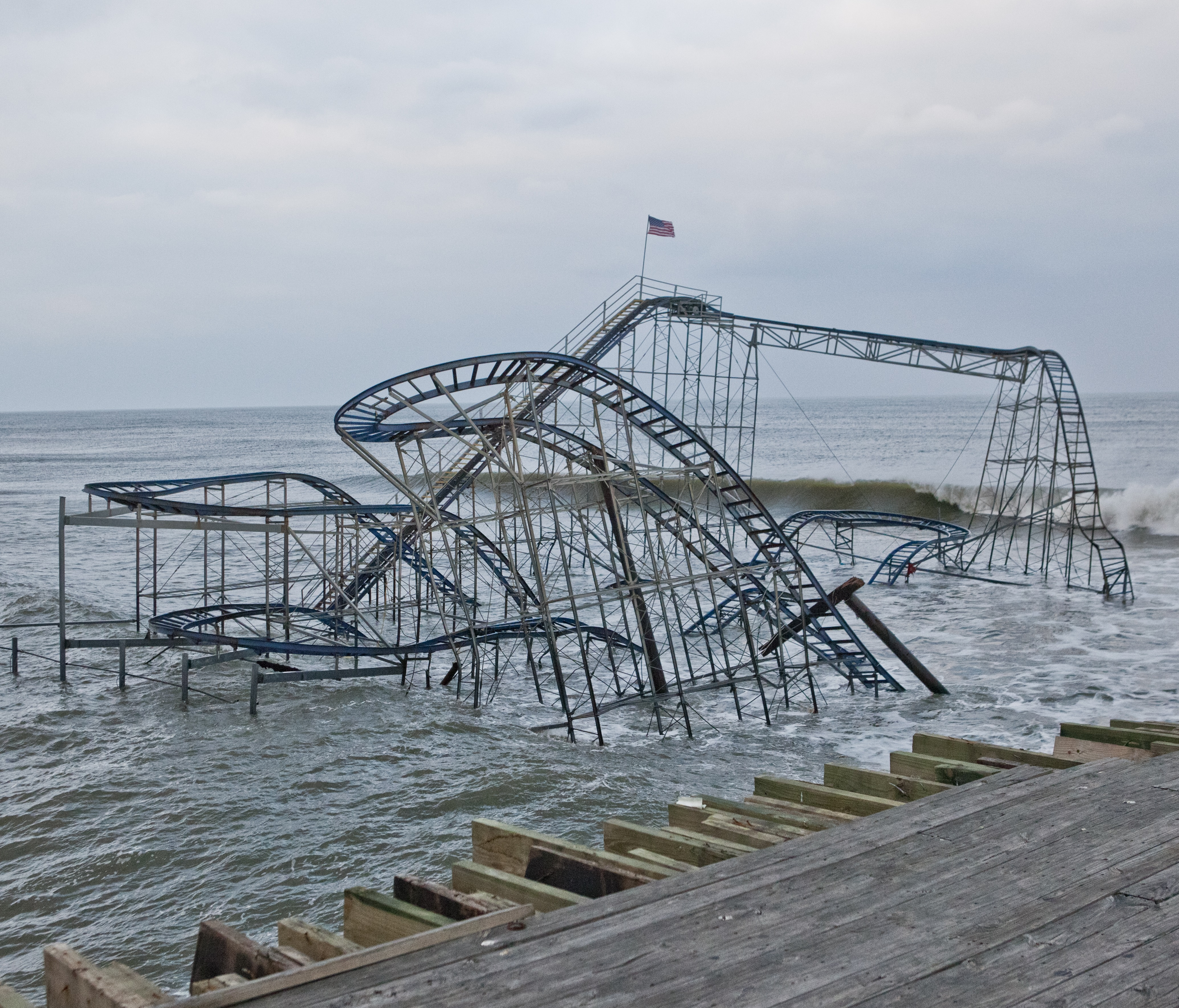
- Star Jet sitting in the Atlantic Ocean after Hurricane Sandy

Casino Pier
- Location: Casino Pier
- Coordinates: 39.9428°N 74.0683°W
- Status: Removed
- Opening date: 2002
- Closing date: October 29, 2012
- Replaced: Jet Star
- Replaced by: Hydrus

General statistics
- Type: Steel
- Manufacturer: E&F Miler Industries
- Model: Hi-Miler
- Height: 52 ft (16 m)
- Height restriction: 42 in (107 cm)
- Trains: 3 trains with 3 cars; riders arranged 2 across in a single row for a total of 6 riders per train
- Star Jet at RCDB

Star Jet was a steel roller coaster that operated at Casino Pier in Seaside Heights, New Jersey from 2002 until it was swept into the Atlantic Ocean by Hurricane Sandy in 2012.

== Construction and early operation ==
Star Jet was a replacement for the similarly-named Jet Star roller coaster, which operated on Casino Pier from 1970 until 2000. The similarity in names between the Star Jet and its predecessor has resulted in Star Jet being frequently misidentified in the media as Jet Star, and even misidentified on Casino Pier's own website following Hurricane Sandy.

=== Incidents ===
In July 2008, a Bulgarian student worker Stanislav Dragnev was struck and killed by a moving coaster train. The worker had entered a restricted area while retrieving a park patron's lost hat.

== Hurricane Sandy ==
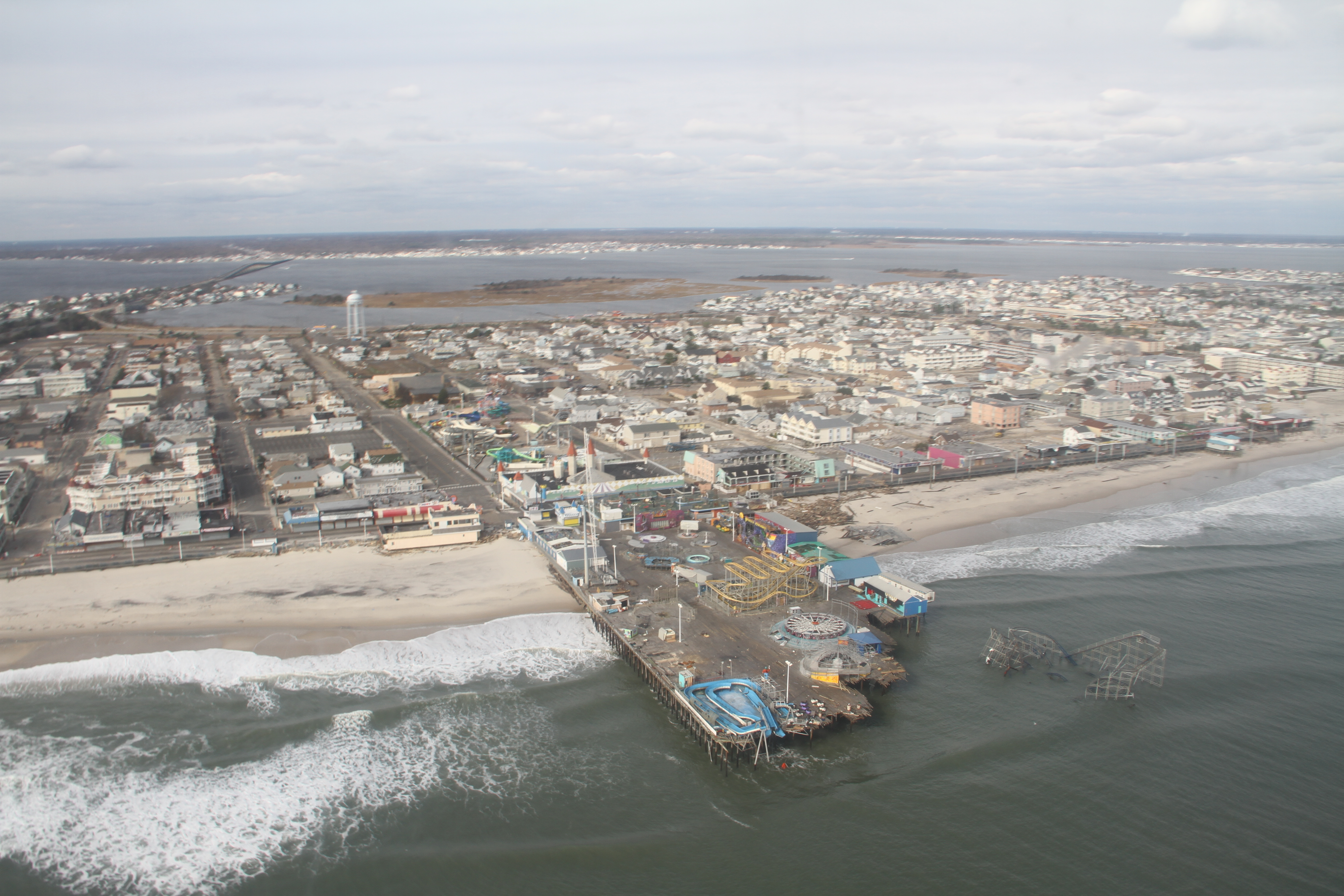
Aerial view of damage to Casino Pier following Hurricane Sandy. Star Jet is at lower right.

On October 29, 2012, Hurricane Sandy came on shore, causing considerable damage along the Atlantic Coast, particularly along the New York and New Jersey shores. The storm caused the collapse of a large section of Casino Pier, dumping Star Jet into the Atlantic Ocean and damaging several other rides.

Despite being thrown into the ocean, the structure of the Star Jet remained largely intact. Images of the coaster, now standing amid the surf, became emblematic of the immense destruction that the hurricane had dealt out along the coast. On January 8, 2013, a man, wanting to raise awareness for Hurricane Sandy recovery efforts, climbed the derelict structure of the Star Jet and placed a United States flag at the top of the coaster before being arrested by police. The coaster was torn down and removed from the ocean on May 14, 2013 starting just after noon and immediately after a brief visit by New Jersey Governor Chris Christie and Prince Harry.

Star Jet's replacement, Hydrus, opened in May 2017. However, the replacement coaster opened on the beach instead of the pier to protect it from future storms.
