= Cyclops (roller coaster) =

Roller coaster at Mt. Olympus Water & Theme Park Resort

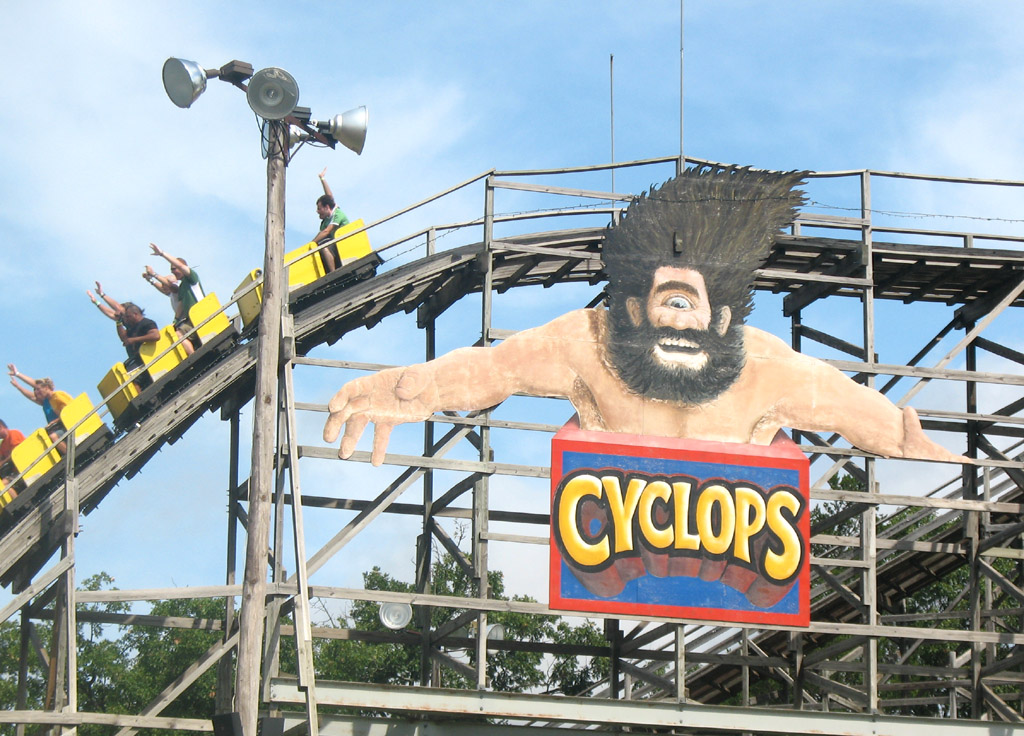
- The ride in 2007

Mt. Olympus Water & Theme Park Resort
- Location: Mt. Olympus Water & Theme Park Resort
- Coordinates: 43°36′58″N 89°47′23″W
- Status: Operating
- Opening date: 1995
- Cost: $7,000,000

General statistics
- Type: Wood
- Manufacturer: Custom Coasters International
- Designer: Dennis McNulty, Larry Bill
- Track layout: Terrain
- Lift/launch system: Chain lift hill
- Height: 70 ft (21 m)
- Drop: 75 ft (23 m)
- Length: 1,900 ft (580 m)
- Speed: 58 mph (93 km/h)
- Duration: 1:00
- Max vertical angle: 52°
- G-force: 4.2
- Height restriction: 48 in (122 cm)
- Trains: Single train with 5 cars; riders arranged 2 across in 2 rows for a total of 20 riders per train
- Cyclops at RCDB

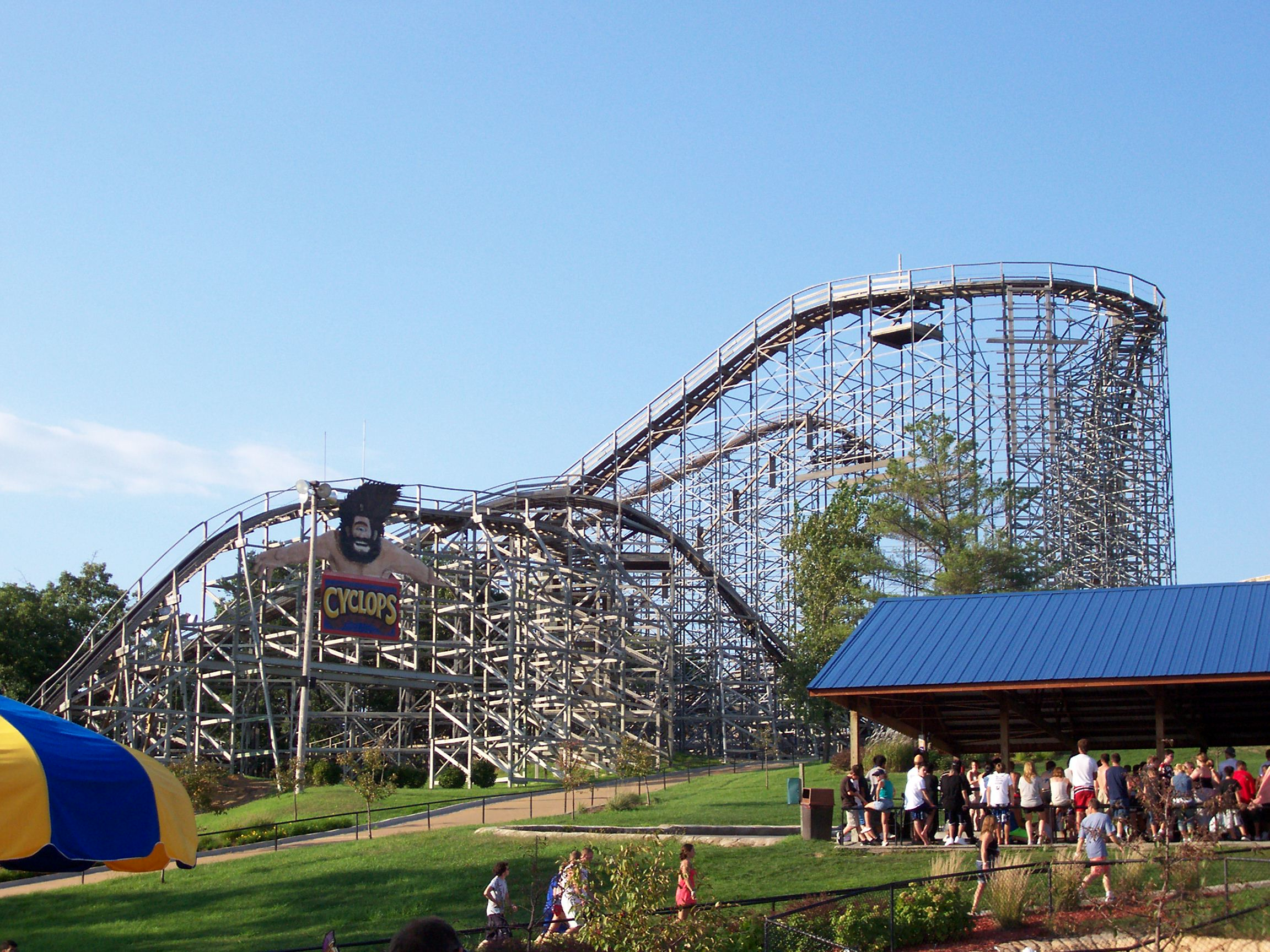
The ride's lift hill and entrance in 2007

Cyclops is a wooden roller coaster located at Mt. Olympus Water & Theme Park Resort in Wisconsin Dells, Wisconsin, United States. The ride opened in 1995 and was built by Custom Coasters International. It was designed by Dennis McNulty and Larry Bill. The ride operates with a single train built by Philadelphia Toboggan Coasters.

The ride is 70 feet (21 m) tall, and features a 75 foot (23 m) drop with top speeds of 58 mph (93 km/h).

The last car of the train previously experienced intense forces in some elements on the ride. Because of this, only riders 18 and older were allowed to ride the last car. However, in 2014, the problematic spots were reprofiled, and the park now allows riders under 18 into the last car of the train.
