= Remlinger Farms =

Coordinates: 47°38′25″N 121°54′09″W

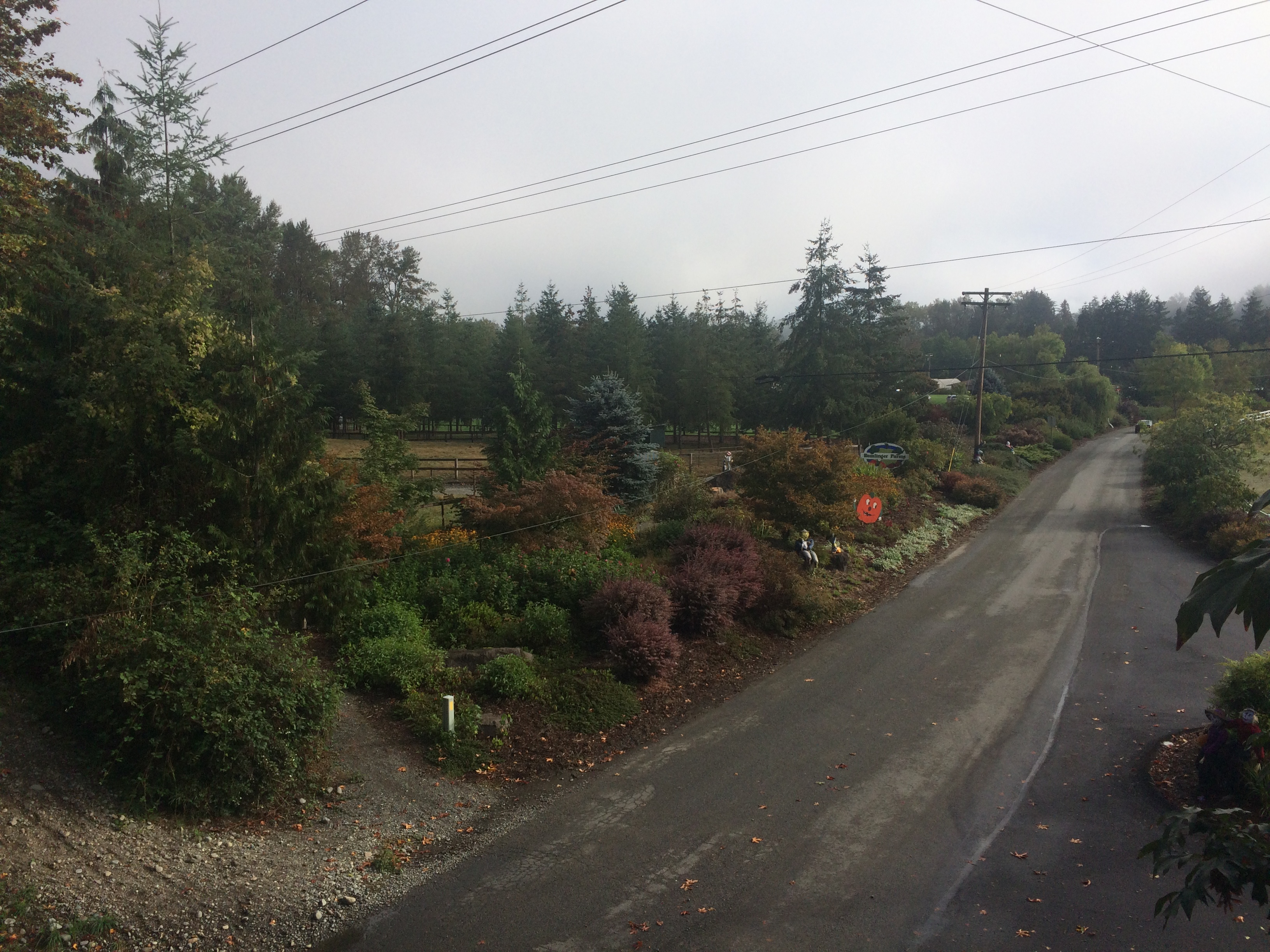
Remlinger Farms, viewed from the Snoqualmie valley trail that passes by it

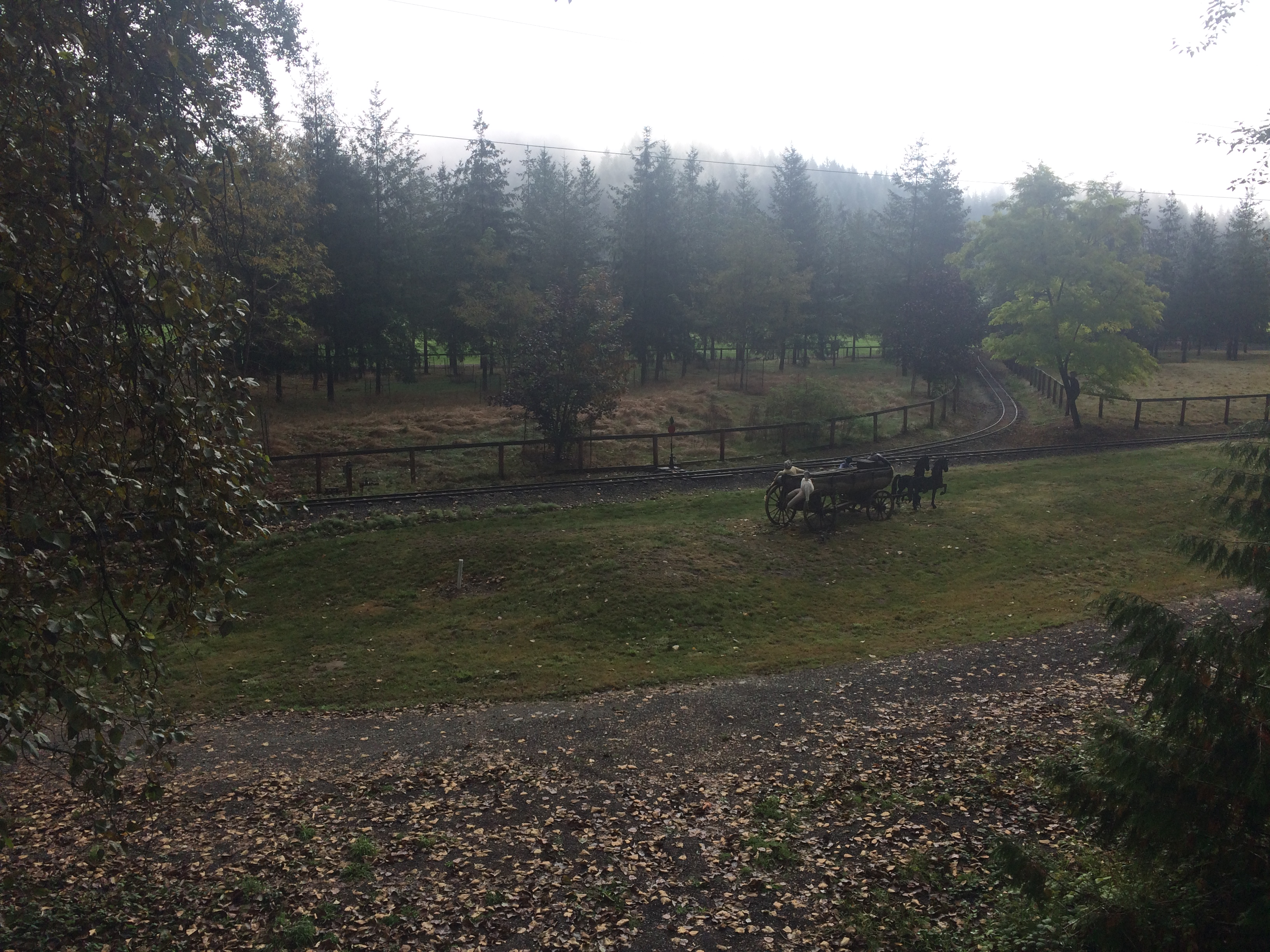
Train tracks running through Remlinger Farms

Remlinger Farms is a 350-acre (1.4 km^{2}) working farm located in Carnation, Washington, and listed in the Library of Congress Local Legacies Project. It is open to the public for six months of the year with amusement rides, entertainment, u-pick fields and corn mazes specializing in local produce. It was originally created from the Remlinger family farm, owned by Floyd Remlinger, before being taken over by his son, Gary Remlinger.

== History ==
Beginning in 1965, the farm has evolved and grown much larger, adding a farm market, amusement rides, theater, petting zoo, restaurant, and the Tolt River Railroad Steam Train Ride that travels on a figure-8 loop, 2 ft (610 mm) narrow gauge track within the farm. The train was originally pulled by one of two genuine steam engines built by Crown Metal Products, but both were later sold to the Fun Farm Pumpkin Patch in Kearney, Missouri. The train is now pulled by one of two diesel-powered steam outline locomotives.

== Activities ==
During the spring and fall, the farm hosts educational school tours, allowing schoolchildren the chance to see a working farm, ride on the amusement rides (including a small roller coaster), learn about farm animals and even get up close to them, from cows to bees, safely.

The farm hosts a month-long pumpkin patch for the entire month of October, ending its year on Halloween.
