= Hades 360 =

Roller coaster at Mt. Olympus Water & Theme Park Resort

- Previously known as Hades (2005–2013)
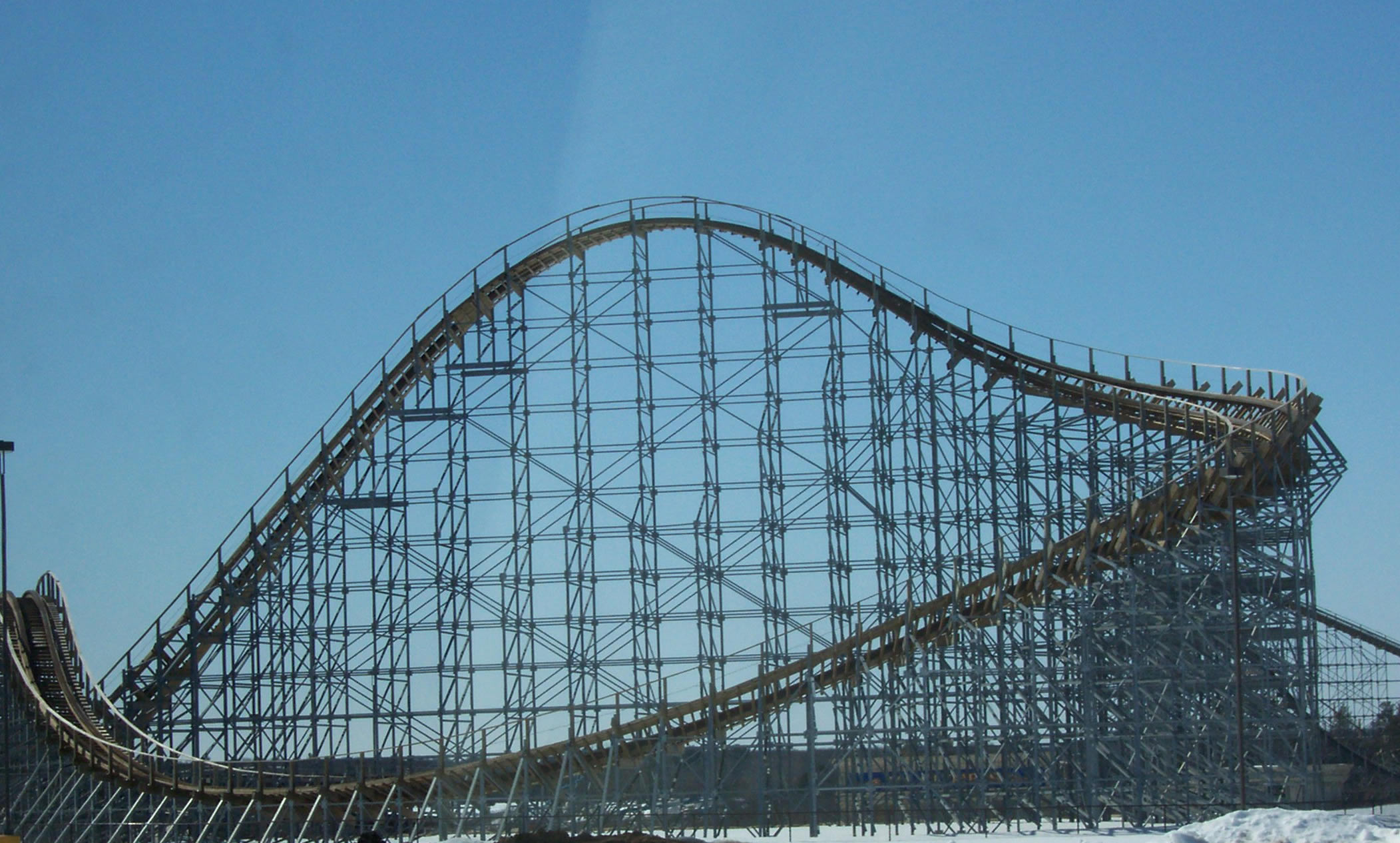
- The turnaround section prior to being reworked into an inversion

Mt. Olympus Water & Theme Park Resort
- Location: Mt. Olympus Water & Theme Park Resort
- Coordinates: 43.617004°N 89.789279°W
- Status: Operating
- Opening date: May 14, 2005

General statistics
- Type: Wood
- Manufacturer: The Gravity Group
- Lift/launch system: Chain lift hill
- Height: 136 ft (41 m)
- Drop: 140 ft (43 m)
- Length: 4,746 ft (1,447 m)
- Speed: 60 mph (97 km/h)
- Inversions: 0 (2005–2012); 1 (2013–present)
- Duration: 2:20
- Max vertical angle: 65°
- G-force: 3.5
- Height restriction: 48 in (122 cm)
- Trains: Single train with 12 cars; riders arranged 2 across in a single row for a total of 24 riders per train
- Hades 360 at RCDB

Hades 360 is a hybrid wooden roller coaster at Mt. Olympus Water & Theme Park Resort in Wisconsin Dells, Wisconsin. When it opened in 2005, the coaster was known as Hades. It was renamed in 2013 when a 360 degree roll was installed. It is the largest roller coaster in the park. Hades 360 has several elements that are uncommon on wooden roller coasters, including its inversion, a 110-degree overbanked turn, and a 90 degree banked turn. Hades was the first ride designed by The Gravity Group.

== History ==
Hades opened on May 14, 2005. In 2013, The Gravity Group added a 360-degree corkscrew at 32 feet (9.8 m) in the air in place of the second hill, as well as an overbanked turn. The ride was renamed Hades 360 to celebrate this addition, and it received a new Timberliner train from The Gravity Group as well, replacing its original train by Philadelphia Toboggan Coasters.

== Awards ==
In its debut year, Hades 360 was voted Best New Ride by Amusement Today magazine. In every year since, the ride has been ranked among the top 50 wooden roller coasters in the Golden Ticket Awards.

Golden Ticket Awards: Top wooden Roller Coasters
Year									1998	1999
Ranking									–	–
Year	2000	2001	2002	2003	2004	2005	2006	2007	2008	2009
Ranking	–	–	–	–	–	6	3	5	6	9
Year	2010	2011	2012	2013	2014	2015	2016	2017	2018	2019
Ranking	8	8	12	14	26	31	36	38	47	43
Year	2020	2021	2022	2023	2024	2025	2026			
Ranking	N/A	39	47	44	39	36	43			

== See also ==
- 2013 in amusement parks
