= Wild Island =

Water park in Sparks, Nevada, United States

Waterpark at Wild Island
- Slogan: Be a Kid. Go to Wild Island.
- Location: Sparks, Nevada, United States
- Coordinates: 39.530799°N 119.713683°W
- General manager: Scott Carothers
- Opened: 1989
- Previous names: Wild Waters 1989-1992, Wild Island Waterpark 1992-2023
- Pools: 4 pools
- Water slides: 11 water slides
- Website: Official Website

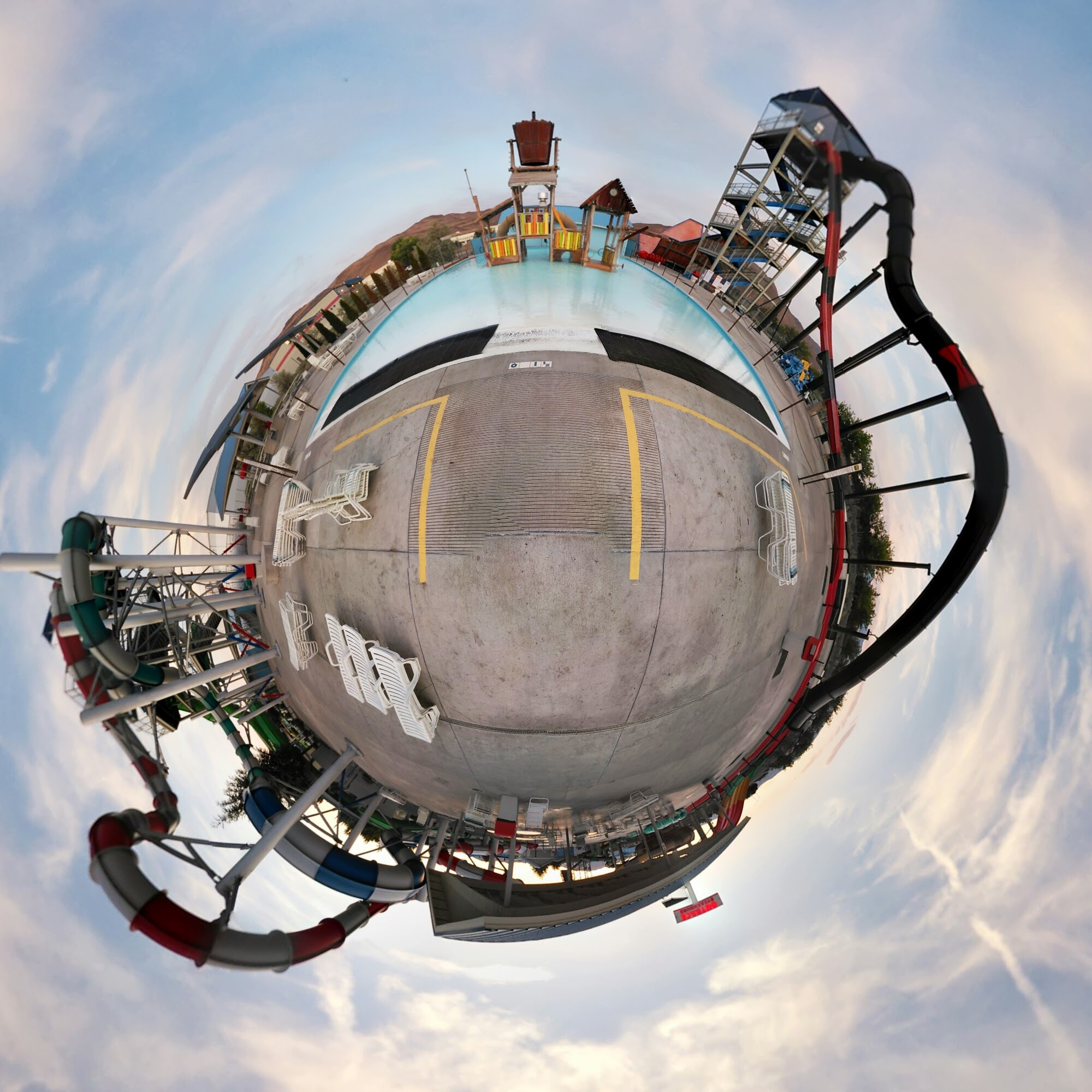
Panoramic photography of Wild Island water park

Wild Island is a water park located off I-80 in the city of Sparks, Nevada. The park is the only one in the vicinity of the double city.

Wild Island opened in June 1989 and has grown and expanded throughout its history. The park originally opened with only five attractions and two pools and has since added numerous other attractions. The park is usually open from the third weekend in May to the Fourth weekend in September giving its guests one of the longest water park seasons on the west coast.

In the summer of 2020 in the midst of the COVID-19 pandemic, the Governor of Nevada gave approval to the park to open at 50% capacity.

== Attractions ==
=== Waterpark ===
==== Current Slides ====
Wild Island includes ten different water slide attractions scattered over four slide towers. All of the park's slide towers are located on the perimeter of the park, with each tower having its own theme. All slides are accessible by stairs and each attraction includes its proper riding instrument.

Family Slide Tower

- Tortuga - A Pro-Slide EXPLOSION PIPELine & FlyingSAUCER that is the longest slide in the park. This attraction includes a duel start basin.
- Fire - A Pro-Slide TWISTER that flashes shades of red and white.
- Ice - A Pro-Slide TWISTER that is half enclosed half open.

Speed Slide Tower

- Black Widow - A Pro-Slide PIPEline that resembles a widow's leg.
- Red Viper - A Pro-Slide FREEfall that is five stories tall.
- Scorpion - A Waterfun Products Sidewinder half pipe attraction.

Dragon Slide Tower

- Eye Of the Dragon- A Cannon Bowl 40 attraction that spins guests in a bowl structure. Commonly called the “Toilet Bowl” by local visitors.
- Dragon's Tail- A Pro-slide TWISTER that is intertwined with the Eye of the Dragon attraction.

Racing Tower

- Zulu Racer - A ProRACER that includes four adjacent lanes of racing.
- G-Force - A WhiteWater West Aquadrop Capsule.

==== Former Slides ====
- Voodoo Express - A single bump free fall located next to Viper. Replace by Black Widow in 1995.
- Viper - A free fall located next to Voodoo Express replaced by Red Viper in 1995.
- Shark Bait and Stingray -Two adjacent open body slides. Replaced by Fire and Ice respectively in 2007.

==== Pools ====
Wild Island has four pools which are all filtered by UV light. Wild Island was the first outdoor water park in North America to have a UV filtration system on all of its pools.

Pool Attractions

- Montego Bay Wave Pool - A standard wave pool.
- Bahama Mama River - A lazy river with a mushroom water feature.
- Little Lagoon - A children's play area with three mini slides.
- Hurricane Cove - A treehouse structure with a dumping bucket.

=== Food and Beverage ===
- Aruba Cafe - A counter service restaurant with American food.
- Island Bistro - A counter service restaurant with bistro inspired food.
- Dippin' Dots - A kiosk that serves Dippin' Dots Ice Cream.
- The Snack Shack - A kiosk that serves snacks and refreshments.
- The Green Coconut - A counter service restaurant that serves "healthy choices."
- Kokomo's 21 Club - An island themed bar.
