= Jet Star (Casino Pier) =

Roller coaster in New Jersey, US (1970–2000)

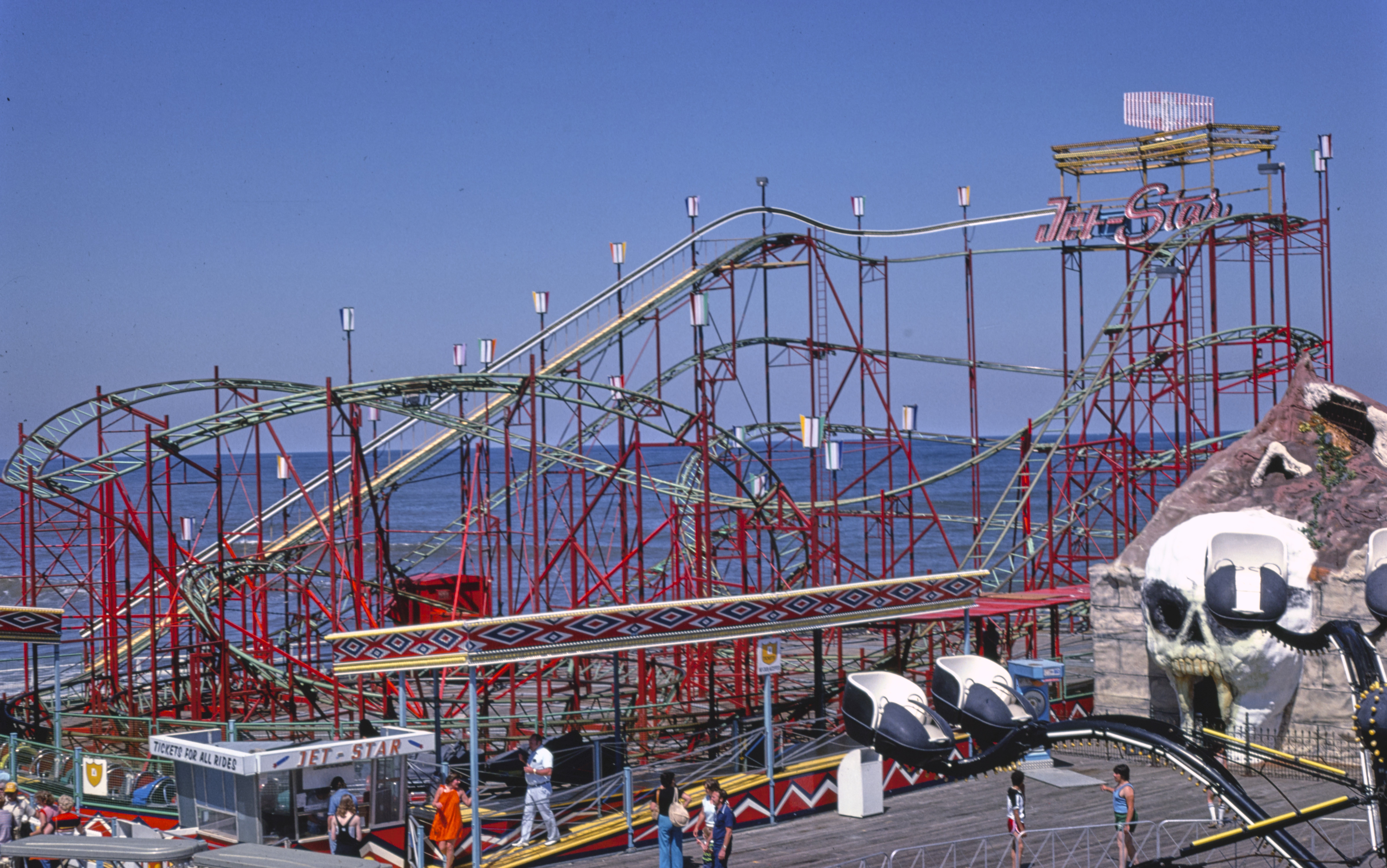
- Jet Star in 1978

Casino Pier
- Location: Casino Pier
- Coordinates: 39.9428°N 74.0683°W
- Status: Removed
- Opening date: 1970
- Closing date: 2000
- Replaced by: Star Jet

General statistics
- Type: Steel
- Manufacturer: Anton Schwarzkopf
- Model: Jet Star
- Height: 44.3 ft (13.5 m)
- Length: 1,765.1 ft (538.0 m)
- Speed: 31.1 mph (50.1 km/h)
- Inversions: 0
- Duration: 1:07
- Jet Star at RCDB

Jet Star, sometimes stylized as Jet-Star, was a steel roller coaster which operated between 1970 and 2000 at Casino Pier in Seaside Heights, New Jersey. It was replaced by—and sometimes confused with—Star Jet, the coaster that was swept into the Atlantic Ocean by Hurricane Sandy on October 29, 2012.

== History ==
For some time there was confusion about the early history of the Jet Star. It was originally thought to have been moved to Casino Pier from a brief run at Palisades Amusement Park. Instead, it seems that it was bought new from Anton Schwarzkopf's company in Germany. Casino Pier had operated Wild Mouse roller coasters in the late 1950s, but by the mid 1960s, ridership numbers were dropping. The Park's operator, Ken Wynne, was traveling in Europe when he found the coaster he thought would be the best replacement—a Jet Star coaster built by Schwarzkopf. Wynne believed that it would provide a much more exciting ride experience than the earlier Wild Mouse coasters.

During the construction of Jet Star, there was some debate on where it should be located on Casino Pier. One story tells of how Wynne told the ride dealer, Roland Koch, where on the pier the coaster should be built. When Wynne returned from lunch, he discovered that Koch had begun to build the coaster in a completely different part of the pier. After a long argument, Koch's preferred location won and the coaster was built where the dealer wanted—at the very end of the pier, overlooking the ocean. As the later Star Jet would ultimately replace the Jet Star, this placement may have proven unlucky for the later coaster, as it was only the far corner of Casino Pier which collapsed during Hurricane Sandy, sending the later coaster into the surf in 2012.

The Jet Star was removed from Casino Pier in 2000. There were some attempts to sell the coaster, but refurbishment would have been too costly. The coaster was ultimately scrapped and the cars sold off.

== Layout and ride experience ==
Having a footprint of 86.6 by 144.3 feet (26.4 by 44.0 m), the coaster was relatively compact, as was typical of the Jet Star model line. It had much steeper drops and higher-speed turns than a Wild Mouse coaster. In 1991, a single ride on the coaster cost 5 tickets (approximately $2.50). In 1997 it was rated as being the most extreme ride on Casino Pier.
