= Casino Pier =

Amusement park in Seaside Heights, New Jersey

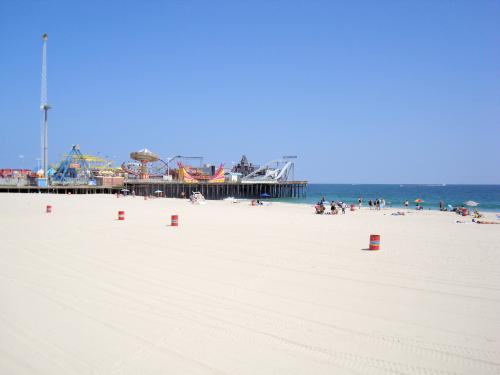
- Casino Pier as seen from the south prior to Hurricane Sandy
- Interactive map of Casino Pier
- Location: Seaside Heights, New Jersey, United States
- Coordinates: 39.9426°N 74.0692°W
- Opened: 1932
- Owner: Storino Family
- Slogan: "Rebuilding Family Memories"
- Operating season: year-round

Attractions
- Total: 31
- Roller coasters: 4
- Water rides: 10
- Website: www.casinopiernj.com

Casino Pier is an amusement park situated on a pier, in Seaside Heights, New Jersey. The pier opened in 1932 under the ownership of Linus R Gilbert, an industrialist. Gilbert acquired the property between Grant and Sherman Avenue extending east from the Boulevard to the Atlantic Ocean and oversaw the construction of the pier under his company, LR Gilbert Construction. The pier formerly extended approximately 300 ft (91 m) into the Atlantic Ocean from the narrow strip of the Barnegat Peninsula, including approximately six blocks within Seaside Heights. In 1937 Linus R. Gilbert expanded the business further with the addition of a 165‘ x 65‘ chlorinated saltwater pool.

Casino Pier was partially destroyed in October 2012 after part of the pier collapsed into the Atlantic Ocean due to the storm surge generated by Hurricane Sandy. Park management rebuilt the pier's lower deck, and a shortened version of the pier reopened with limited rides in 2013. An expansion for the pier opened in 2017, which includes Hydrus (a Euro-Fighter roller coaster) and a Ferris wheel.

== Facilities ==
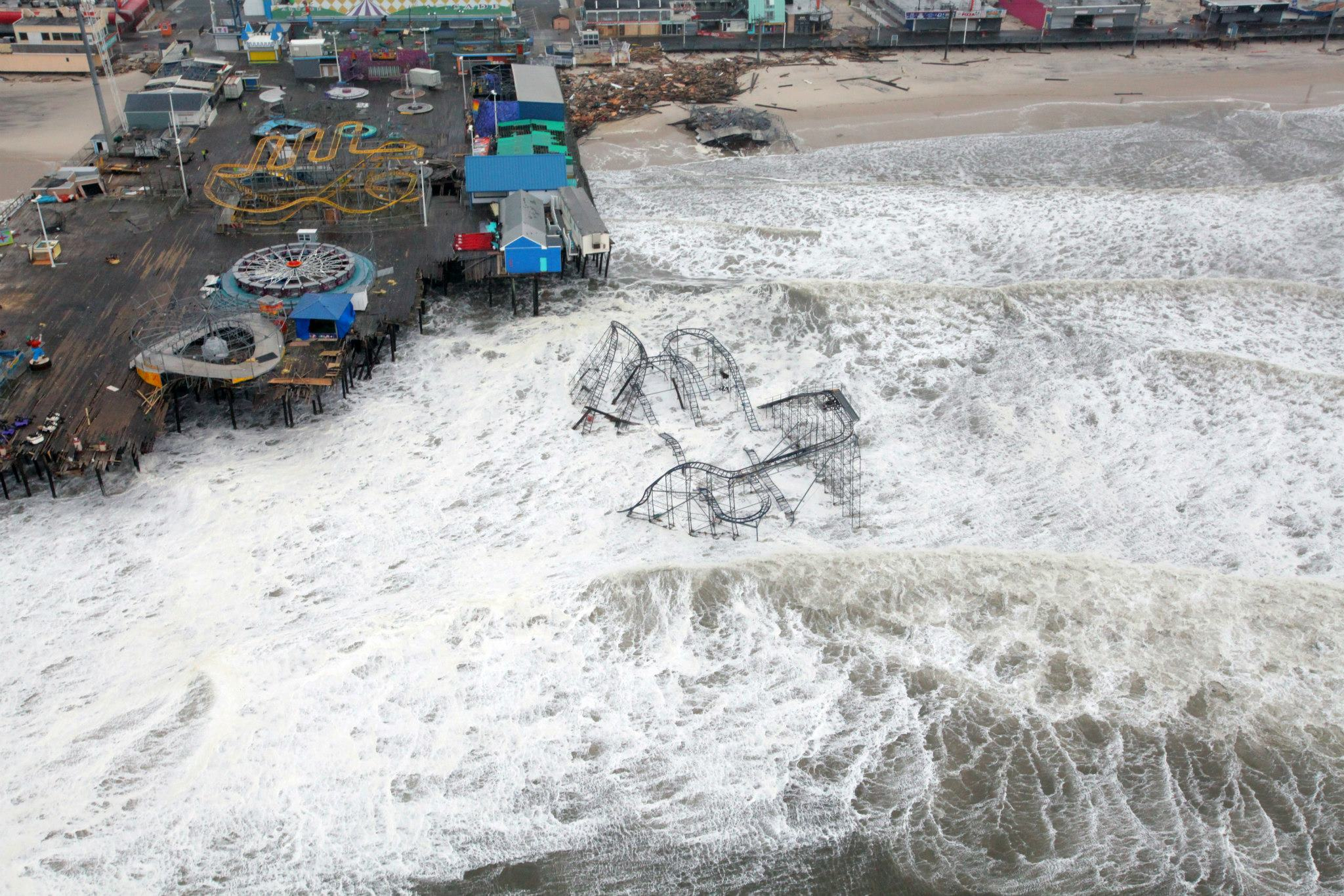
Casino Pier just after Hurricane Sandy

Casino Pier was an amusement facility center featuring numerous rides, games, and concession stands. Before Hurricane Sandy, there were 38 rides on the pier, ranging from family rides to roller coasters; other attractions include a rooftop miniature golf course, a chairlift that runs the length of the Seaside Height's boardwalk north of Casino Pier, a figure 8 Go-Kart track, and numerous concession stands which serve typical boardwalk fare (pizza, cheese steaks, sausage sandwiches, ice cream, funnel cake, and lemonade).

Located in the Casino Pier Arcade, between the boardwalk and Ocean Terrace was once the historic antique carousel built by Dentzel and Looff in 1910 named the Dr. Floyd L. Moreland Carousel. This carousel first arrived in Seaside in 1928. A Wurlitzer style #146-A Military Band Organ originally built in 1923 was also included to provide the carousel's music. The arcade currently houses the Pier Grille, a restaurant. The arcade features numerous arcade games, including claw and pusher redemption games, many popular video games, as well as classic arcade offerings such as Skee-Ball, pinball, and video poker.

The pier itself also featured several games. Some are games of chance, such as spinning wheels, but more often, the games involved a rudimentary amount of skill, such as a ring toss, basketball shoot, balloon dart and Ladder Climb. The games are inspected by New Jersey's Department of Consumer Affairs for fairness of play.

Although most of Casino Pier's offerings have been on the pier itself, additional Casino Pier recreational and concessional areas are located on the boardwalk between Grant Avenue and Sherman Avenue. Casino Pier owns a water park across the street, Breakwater Beach, which was remodeled in 2003 from the original Water Works water park that once stood on the property. Breakwater Beach incorporates numerous water slides with a heavy focus on families. Breakwater Beach has undergone several phases of reconstruction, and several slides have been rebuilt.

The antique Dentzel/Looff carousel was acquired from Casino Pier in 2017 to refurbish and relocate it. The carousel has been closed and was shut off on April 7, 2019, and the disassembly and relocation process began in November 2019. The carousel is now relocated to a new building built specifically to house it and is a carousel museum. The building is located next to the boardwalk between Carteret and Sampson avenues. The carousel was originally scheduled to reopen in its new location by 2021. However, the carousel has reopened July 3, 2024.

== Attractions ==
References:

- Park map (2010, picture)
- Park map (2017, picture)

=== Current attractions ===
==== Kiddie rides ====
- Airplanes – Classic airplane-themed carousel
- Boats – Classic boat-themed carousel
- Car Combo – Classic car-and-truck-themed carousel
- Dizzy Dragons – Dragon-themed tea-cups attraction
- Elephant Express - Classic elephant themed ride manufactured by Zamperla
- Helicopters – Classic helicopter-themed carousel
- Hot Tamales – Mexican-themed kiddie roller coaster
- Jump Around – Dune buggy themed carousel ride manufactured by Zamperla that randomly jumps and bounces as it rotates
- Mermaid Parade – Mermaid themed "North Pole" kiddie log flume ride manufactured by Zamperla
- Motorcycles – Classic motorcycle-themed carousel
- Pony Carts – A pony cart themed carousel
- Speedway – Children's version of the classic whip ride themed to NASCAR

==== Family rides ====
- Bumper Cars – Classic bumper cars attraction featuring music and special-effect lighting
- Carousel – Classic modern carousel
- Crazy Cabs – a flat ride that modernizes the tea cup ride, where you are spinning in multiple directions on a platform
- Disk'O – A circular platform ride with outward-facing seating that spins riders as the platform moves back and forth along a half-pipe track
- Fun Factory
- Go-Karts – Single and double passenger go-kart vehicles that travel up to 14 mph (23 km/h)
- Ferris Wheel – A spinning Ferris wheel that takes riders 131 feet (40 m) above the Jersey shore
- Musik Express – Caterpillar ride that features pop music, lighting, and sound effects
- Pirates Hideaway – Pirate-themed roller coaster (many people call it a junior coaster, but it's more family-built)
- Pirate's Island – Pirate-themed maze with ropes, bridges, and a slide
- Sky Ride – Chairlift transport ride
- Super Slide – A classic slide that riders use rugs to slide on
- Tilt-A-Whirl – Classic Tilt-A-Whirl platform ride
- Wave Swinger – A tilting swing ride that swings riders in a circle as they elevate and descend
- Xolo Loca – A spinning roller coaster manufactured by SBF Visa Group

==== Thrill rides ====
- Centrifuge – an indoor scrambler with lights and interior effects adding to the experience
- Hydrus – a Euro-Fighter Roller coaster manufactured by Gerstlauer with a 97 degree drop
- Shore Shot – Drop tower ride that shoots riders 125 feet (38 m) into the air at 45 mph (72 km/h) producing both positive and negative g-force
- Skycoaster – Swing-style ride that drops riders from 109 feet (33 m) reaching speeds up to 80 mph (130 km/h)
- Skyscraper – A Gravity Works, Inc. Windmill-type attraction that rapidly spins riders 170 feet (52 m) into the air at speeds up to 70 mph (110 km/h)
- Super Storm - An inverting frisbee ride.
- Zero Gravity - A spinning rotor ride manufactured by SBF Visa Group.

=== Former attractions ===
==== Rides removed after Hurricane Sandy ====
- Air Race – Airplane-themed attraction in which riders experience up to 3 G's during loops and dives that reach heights of 25 feet (7.6 m)
- Crazy Bus
- Moby Dick - Attraction was named and themed after the 1851 novel Moby-Dick, by Herman Melville. It was a horizontal platform ride that elevated and descended quickly as it rotated vertically.
- Surf Shack

==== Rides destroyed during Hurricane Sandy ====
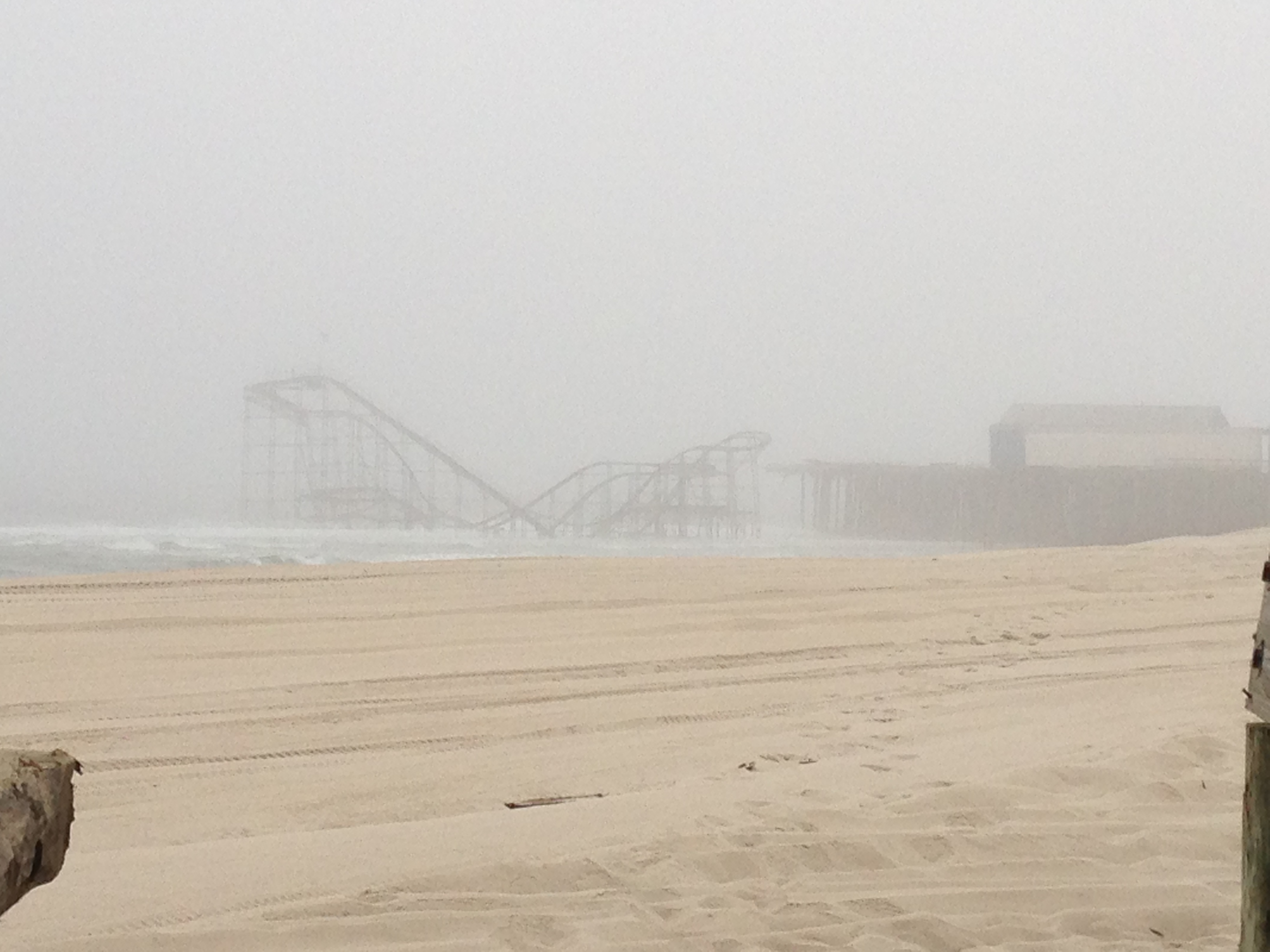
The Star Jet Roller Coaster from Casino Pier a week before demolition, Seaside Heights, New Jersey

- Star Jet – fell into the Atlantic Ocean during Hurricane Sandy in 2012 and was demolished in May 2013
- Wild Mouse - the original one was closed in 2012, and it was relocated to Scandla family fun center, and it was also renamed as Crazy Dane Coaster in 2015.
- Log Flume – destroyed after falling into the Atlantic Ocean during Hurricane Sandy in 2012
- Lady Bugs
- Kite Flyer
- Samba Balloons
- Kid Swing Ride
- Pharaoh's Fury
- Tornado
- Safari Train
- Funhouse
- Centrifuge - the original one got destroyed, and Casino Pier added a brand new one after the storm.
- Stillwalk Manor – destroyed after falling into the Atlantic Ocean during Hurricane Sandy in 2012
- Rock Wall
- Rock N' Roll
- Enterprise (ride)
- Musik Express – the original one got destroyed, and Casino Pier added a brand new one after the storm
- Tilt a Whirl – the original one got destroyed, and Casino Pier added a brand new one after the storm

==== Rides removed before Hurricane Sandy ====
- Jet Star (roller coaster operated from 1970 to 2000)
- Inverter
- Sling Shot
- Himalaya
- Power Surge
- Gravitron
- Flying Bobs
- Wizards Cavern
- Swiss-Bob
