= Mt. Olympus Water & Theme Park Resort =

Amusement park in Wisconsin Dells, Wisconsin

- Previously known as Big Chief Go-Kart World (1990–1995); Big Chief's Karts and Coasters (1995–2004); Big Chief's Mt. Olympus Theme Park (2004)
- Interactive map of Mt. Olympus Water & Theme Park Resort
- Location: Wisconsin Dells, Wisconsin, United States
- Coordinates: 43.615145°N 89.789382°W
- Status: Operating
- Opened: 1990
- Owner: The Laskaris family
- Operating season: May through October (outdoor theme and water park); Year-round (indoor theme and water park)
- Area: 102.2 acres (0.414 km^{2})

Attractions
- Total: 39
- Roller coasters: 5
- Website: Official website

Mt. Olympus Water & Theme Park Resort is a theme park and water park resort complex in Wisconsin Dells, Wisconsin. The resort is themed to Ancient Greece, particularly its mythology and gods, and is named after the mountain in Greece where those gods were said to live. Mt. Olympus features an indoor and outdoor water park, amusement rides, and dozens of mom-and-pop motel buildings that were acquired by the resort in addition to its purpose-built hotel, Hotel Rome.

== History ==
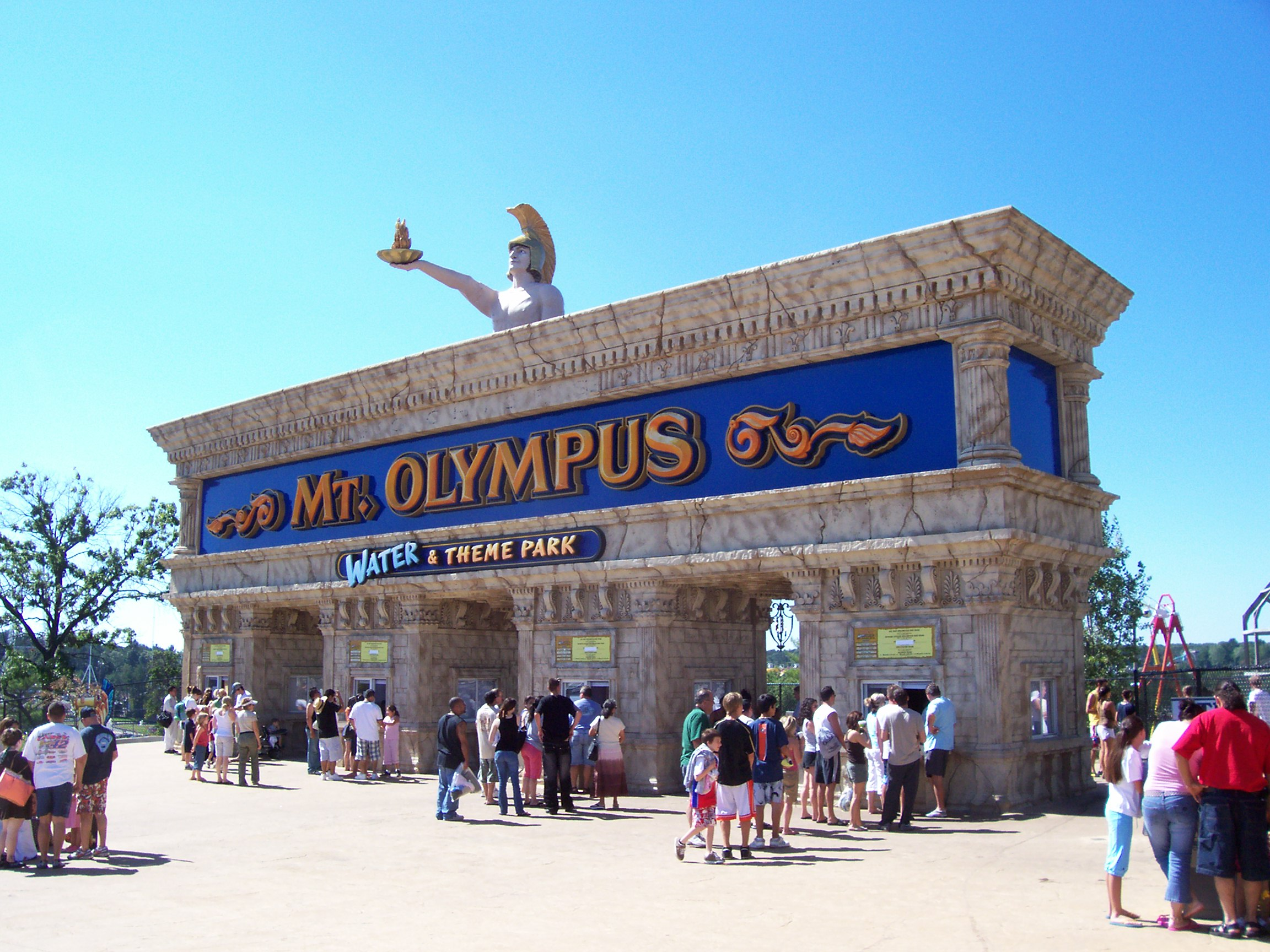
Park entrance in 2007

=== Beginnings ===
Mt. Olympus was founded by the Laskaris family. Demetrios “Jim” Laskaris was born in Katsaros, Greece and immigrated to the United States at the age of 13. He received a technical degree in Michigan, served for four years in the U.S. Navy, and later owned and operated several restaurants in Chicago, Illinois. The family moved to Wisconsin Dells in 1970, where Jim and his wife Fotoula opened a hot dog stand, which they named “Big Chief”, after a statue they purchased from a trade show. The hot dog stand was a commercial failure, and as a result the Laskaris family was nearly forced to return to Chicago. Instead, they found $700 in savings inside a sock, which they invested in a three-wheeler dirt track.

The family expanded on the property by building a seven-unit motel, and in 1975 they added a go-kart track known as Goofy Karts along the Wisconsin Dells Parkway. Nick Laskaris, Jim and Fotoula's son, became the go-karts' chief mechanic at the age of nine. From 1978 to 1982, the family's business ventures continued as they opened a campground and trailer park on the premises, and began to hold country-western and Native American ceremony shows. When the lease on Goofy Karts ended in 1980, it was removed, and a new cloverleaf track was built next to the Big Chief hot dog stand. It was also at this location that Nick Laskaris began constructing his own go-karts a few years later.

Nick became involved in the design and engineering of the various go-kart tracks in the park, which by this point was known as Big Chief Go-Kart World. The family purchased several acres along the Wisconsin Dells Parkway and continued the park's expansion. In 1995, the park added their first roller coaster, Cyclops, and the park's name was changed to Big Chief Karts and Coasters. Another roller coaster, Pegasus, was installed the following year, and Zeus opened in 1997. The park acquired Crazy King Ludwig's Adventure Park, which featured its own go-kart track, in 1999. This purchase brought the total amount of land owned by the park to an area of 107 acres (0.4 km^{2}).

=== Expansion into a theme park ===
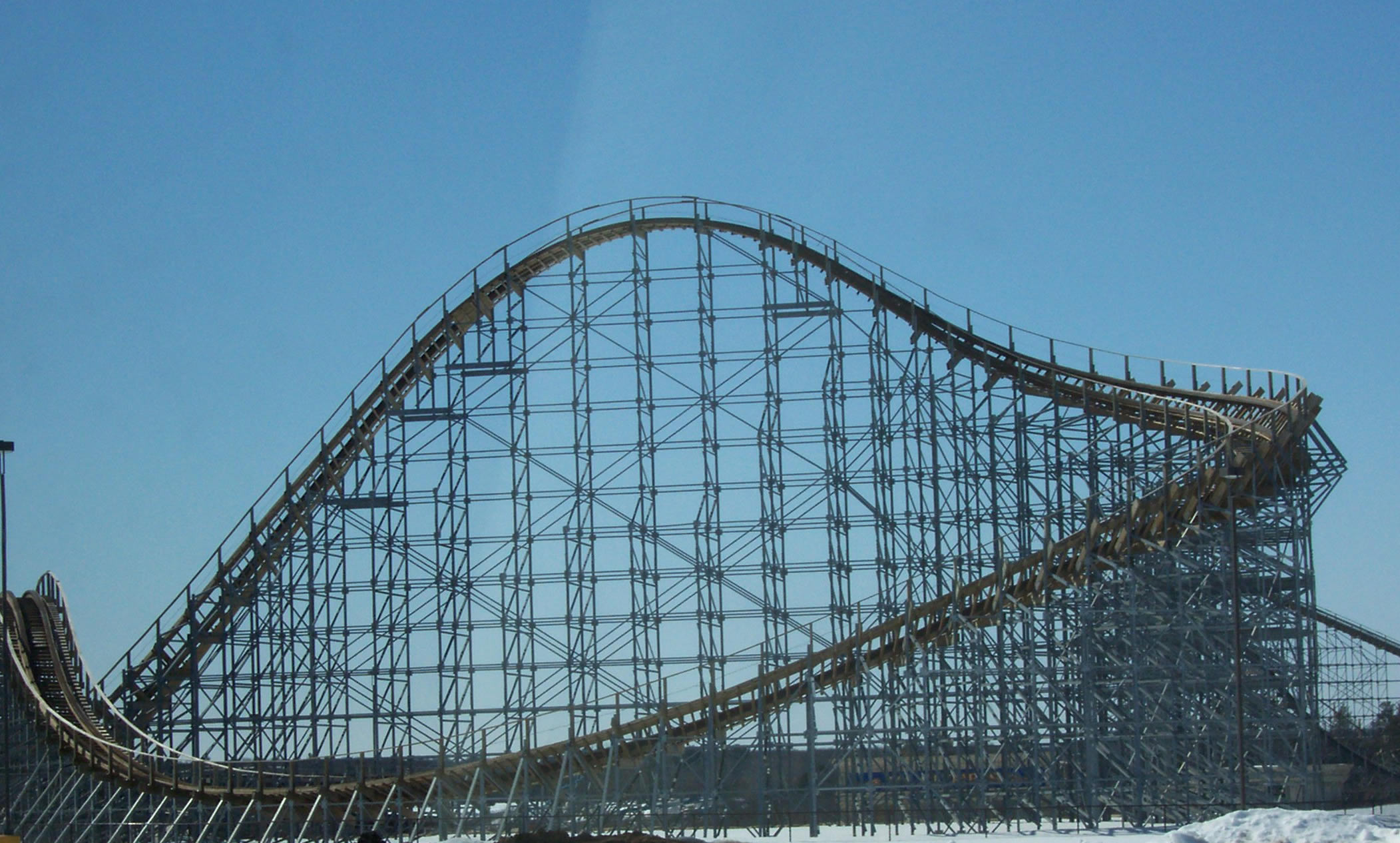
Hades 360 in 2007, when it was known simply as Hades. The pictured section of the ride has since been modified to include a barrel roll and an overbanked turn.

Big Chief Karts and Coasters was renamed to Big Chief's Mt. Olympus Theme Park in 2004 as the park expanded its Greco-Roman theming. Later that year, the park entered into a partnership with the Mattei family, owners of the nearby Treasure Island Resort. This partnership merged Treasure Island Resort's outdoor Family Land Waterpark and indoor Bay of Dreams water park with the Mt. Olympus park, creating a co-owned complex known as Mt. Olympus Water & Theme Park Resort. These two parks were not physically connected at the time of the merger because a motel separated them. Mt. Olympus eventually purchased the motel and demolished it.

The park opened their largest roller coaster, Hades, for the 2005 season. Hades is a hybrid wooden roller coaster, and it was notable for its drops and angles, which were unusually steep for wooden coasters at the time. It received the inaugural Golden Ticket Award for Best New Ride from Amusement Today. In 2006, Mt. Olympus introduced the Parthenon Indoor Theme Park, a 43,000 sq ft building containing several amusement rides, including a spinning wild mouse roller coaster called Opa. Mt. Olympus also acquired Treasure Island Resort entirely from the Mattei family. The purchase of Treasure Island Resort included Pleasant View Motel, which became Mykonos Village, and the Captain's Quarters, a family-oriented hotel which was sold to Bluegreen Resorts and now operates as Bluegreen Odyssey Dells, attached to the Treasure Island Resort, which became Hotel Rome. The acquisition of the resort added 60 acres (240,000 m^{2}) of real estate to the park's property, bringing the total area to 156 acres (0.6 km^{2}).

In 2010 and 2011, the park purchased several smaller nearby independent motels and hotels and renamed them, creating seven new lodging areas for the park. These acquisitions included Star Motel and Luna Inn & Suites (which became Poseidon's Village), Riverwalk Hotel (which became Santorini Village), American World Resort & Campground (which became Zeus's Village), and Four Seasons Motel (which became Poseidon's Village). Mt. Olympus also purchased the Raintree Resort and Conference Center.

Copa Cabana Resort Hotel & Suite was completely renovated after it was purchased by Mt. Olympus in 2011, and it reopened as the core of Mt. Olympus Village the following spring. All of the resort's acquired motels were rebranded once again to Mt. Olympus Village in 2013. This change coincided with the purchases of the Concord Inn and the Monaco Motel. The addition of these properties gave the resort a total of over 1,300 rooms.

Lost City of Atlantis, a three-acre outdoor water park, opened in 2012. Lost City of Atlantis features seven slides from WhiteWater West, a water dump bucket, and a 120 foot (36 m) artificial geyser, built at a cost of $3.5 million.

Hades received a major renovation in 2013, adding a 360-degree inversion to its parking lot turnaround section, and the coaster was renamed Hades 360. The Manticore, a vertical swing ride, was added to the park in 2015. Great Pool of Delphi, a 27,000 square foot (2,322 sq m) swimming pool containing 500,000 gallons (1,892,705 l) of water, was added in 2016. The pool was advertised as the largest swimming pool in Wisconsin Dells, and cost $4 million to install. The park also acquired Diamond Hotel in 2015 and Ambers Resort and Conference Center in 2016.

In 2019, Mt. Olympus representatives announced at the International Association of Amusement Parks and Attractions Expo their purchase of a new water slide for the 2021 season. Tentatively named Hercules, the slide would consist of a perpetually rotating wheel which rafts would be dispatched into every 30 seconds, and move through the knot of slide tunnels akin to a massive hamster wheel. However, the impact of the COVID-19 pandemic in 2020 halted plans to install the slide in time for the 2021 season. The slide, which had been renamed Medusa's Slidewheel, was re-announced on August 6, 2021, and opened for the 2022 season as the first slide of its kind in North America. Medusa's Slidewheel's addition also brought about an expansion to the indoor water park, with a smaller pool named Serpent's Pool.

In 2024, Mt. Olympus opened The Rise of Icarus water slide complex, which included Icarus Tower, consisting of 5 slides, and Icaria Splash 'N Slide, a children's water play area. At 145 feet (44 m) tall, The Rise of Icarus broke the record for North America's tallest water slide.

== Rides and attractions ==
=== Outdoor theme park ===
==== Roller coasters ====
Name	Manufacturer	Year opened	Type
Cyclops	Custom Coasters International	1995	Wooden roller coaster
Hades 360	The Gravity Group	2005	Hybrid wooden roller coaster. Contains an inversion and the longest section of underground track found on any roller coaster. Originally opened as Hades, and did not feature an inversion. The inversion was added in 2013.
Little Titans	E&F Miler Industries	2000	Steel children's roller coaster
Pegasus	Custom Coasters International	1996	Wooden roller coaster
Zeus	Custom Coasters International	1997	Wooden roller coaster

==== Go-kart tracks ====
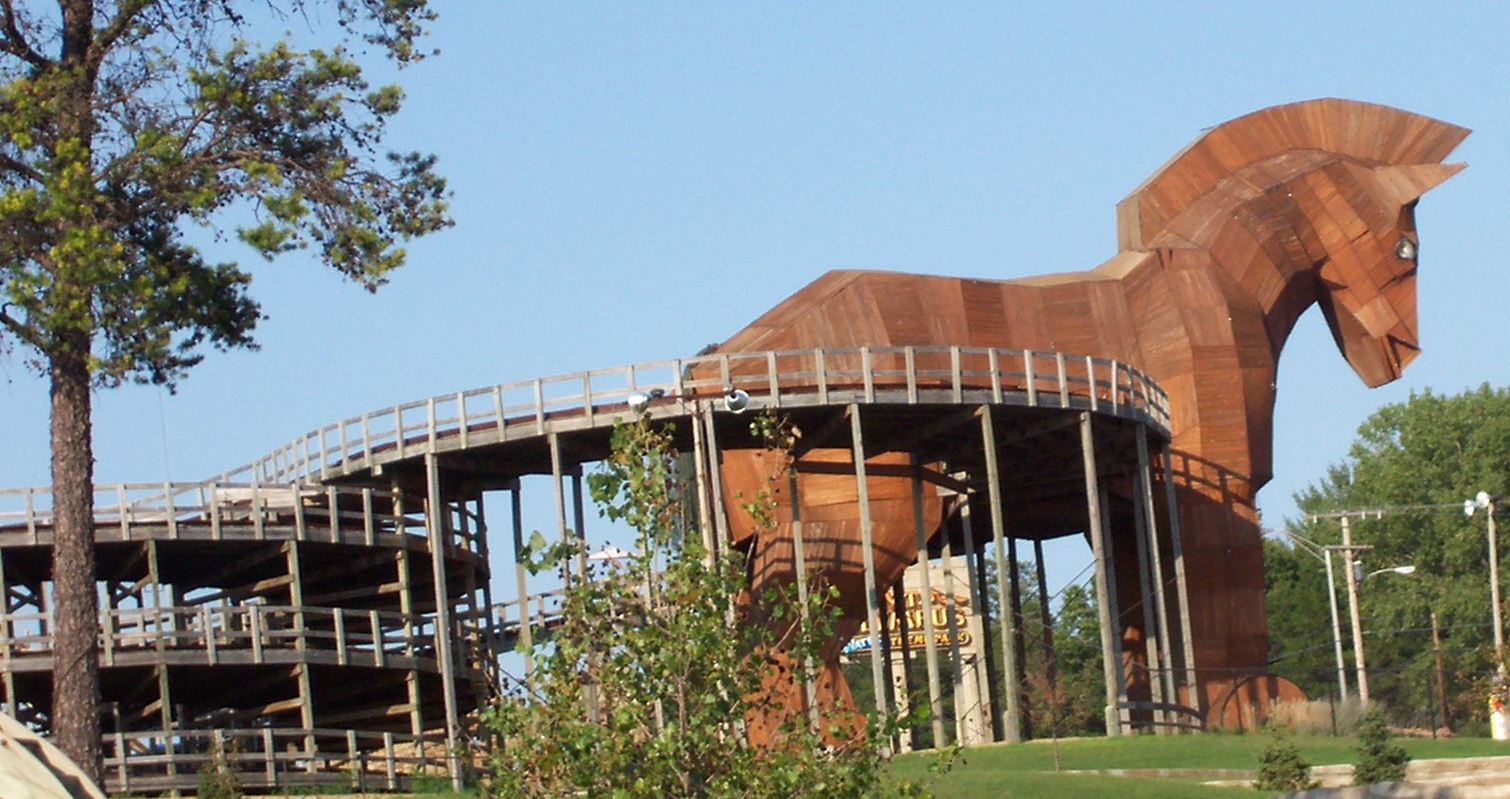
Trojan Horse Go-Kart Track in 2007

Go-kart tracks
Name	Opened	Description
Helios Go-Kart Track	Unknown	Multi-level go-kart track
Hermes Turbo Go-Kart Track	Unknown	The fastest go-kart track at the park
Orion (Juniors) Go-Kart Track	Unknown	An intermediate go-kart track intended for children
Tiny Hero Go-Kart Track	Unknown	A beginner's go-kart track for young children
Titan's Go-Kart Track	Unknown	An intermediate go-kart track
Trojan Horse Go-Kart Track	1997	Multi-level go-kart track
Underworld Go-Kart Track	Unknown	Go-kart track with underground sections. Was known as Poseidon Underwater Go-Kart Track prior to 2018.

==== Other rides ====
- Apollo's Swing – A 100-foot (30 m) S&S – Sansei Technologies Screamin' Swing upcharge attraction that reaches speeds of 70 mph (113 km/h)
- The Manticore – A 140-foot tall swing ride

==== Former rides ====
- Catapult – A reverse bungee ride. It was removed in July 2015 after one of its cables snapped.
- Dive to Atlantis – E&F Miler Industries water coaster. Opened in 2004 and closed in 2007.
- Kiddie Train – A children's miniature train
- The Almighty Hermes – A Skycoaster that reached heights of 100 feet and speeds of up to 45 miles per hour

=== Indoor theme park ===
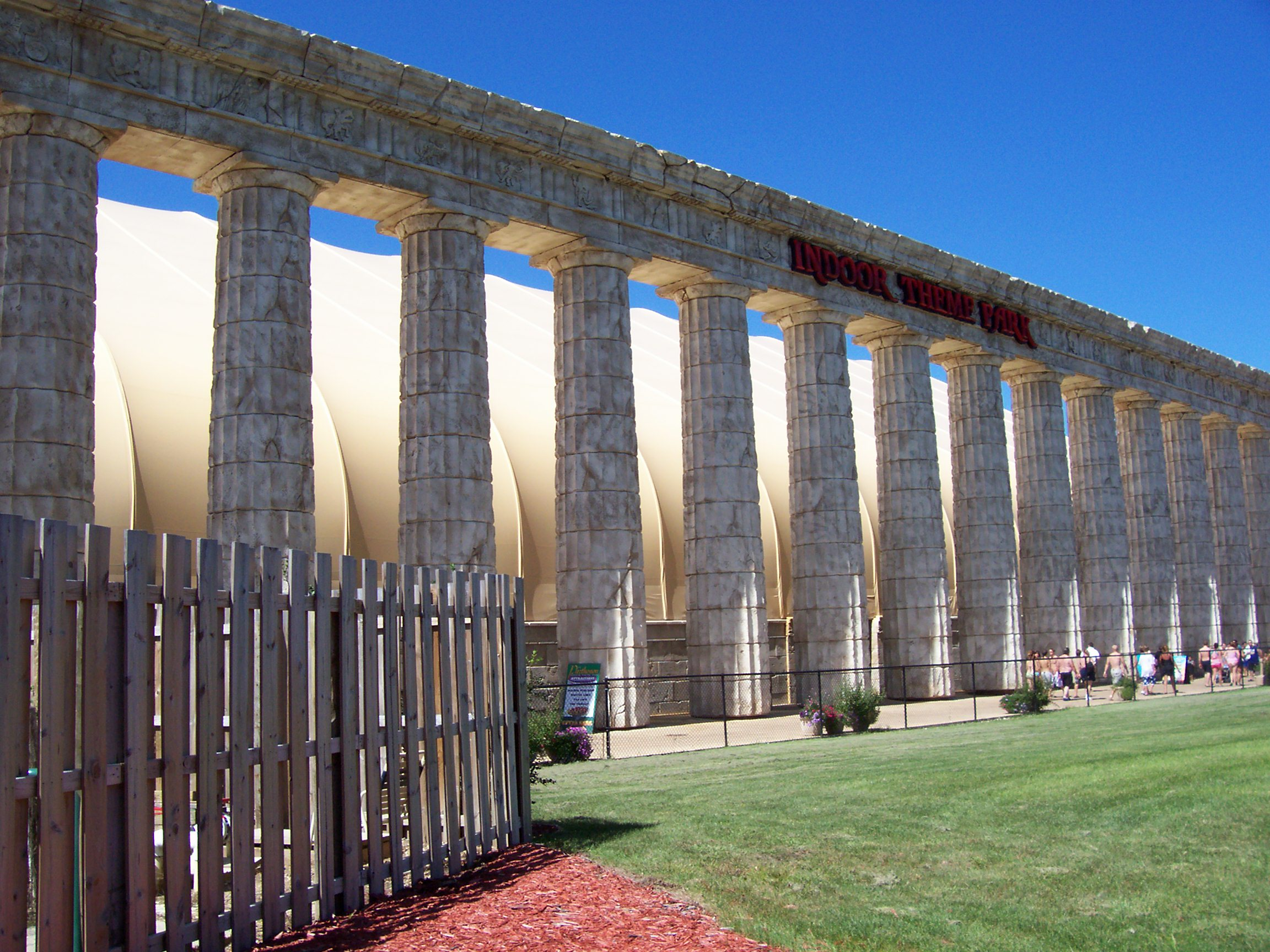
The outside exterior of the indoor theme park; the columns are made out of styrofoam.

==== Current rides ====
- Balloon Ride – A Zamperla Balloon Race ride
- Bi Plane Ride – A small spinning children's ride
- Bumper Cars – Bumper cars
- Crazy Trolley – A Crazy Bus ride
- Kiddie Swing – A children's swing ride
- Rock Climbing Wall – An upcharge climbing wall
- Tea Cups – A Zamperla teacups ride

==== Former rides ====
- Disk'o – A Zamperla Disk'O ride
- Free Fall
- Go-Karts – A go-kart track
- Opa – A steel spinning wild mouse roller coaster. Opened in 2006 and closed in 2014 after an incident which resulted in the serious injury of a rider.
- Spring Ride

=== Outdoor water park ===
==== Water slides ====
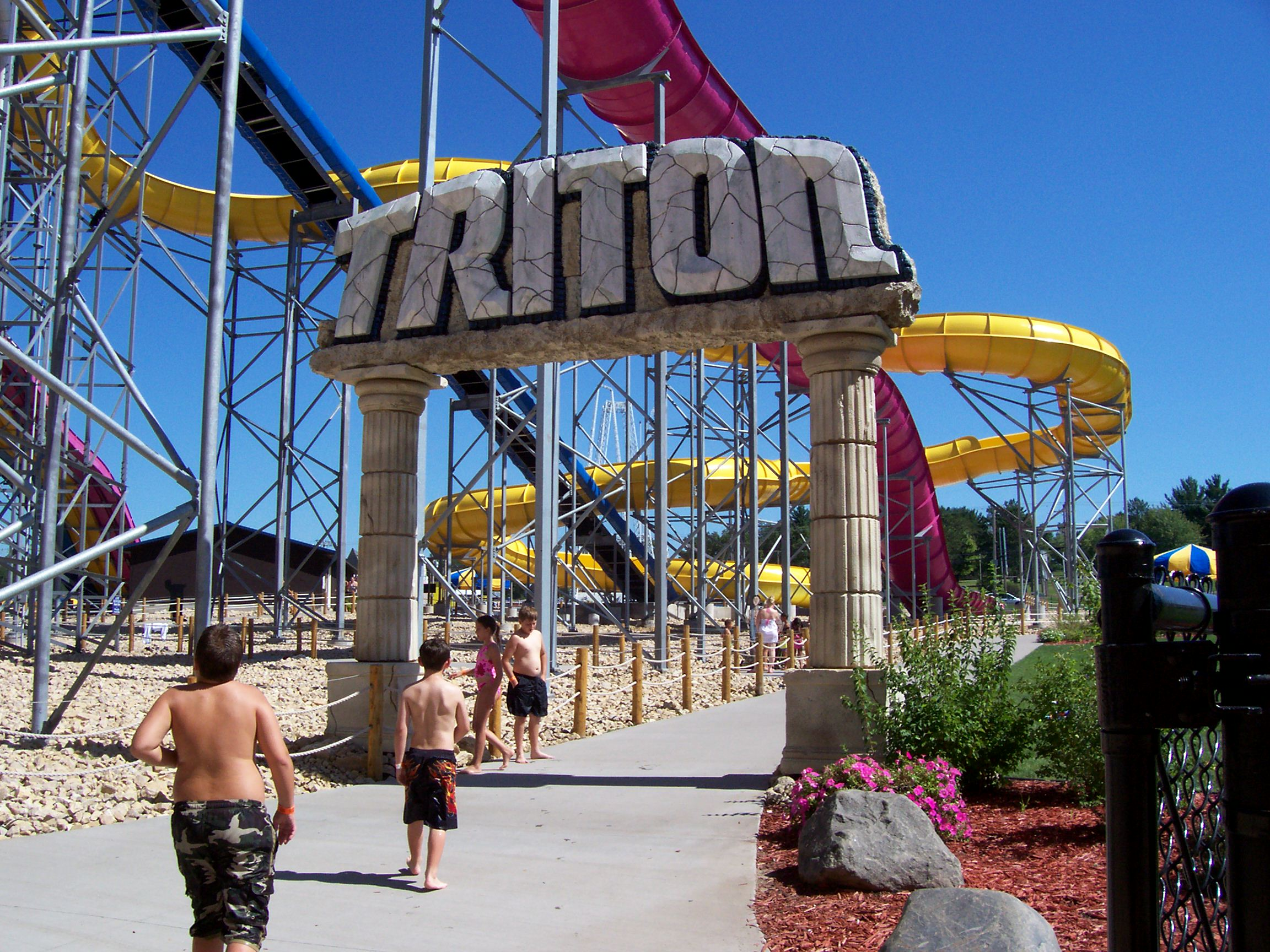
Triton slide complex entrance in 2007

- The Rise of Icarus – Water slide complex. Opened in 2024. Features five slides: The Journey, The Drop, The Voyage, The Flight, and The Fall.
- Triton – Water slide complex. Features three slides: Triton's Fury (a raft slide), Triton's Rage (a raft slide), and Triton's Challenge (a six-lane mat racer slide).

==== Other attractions ====
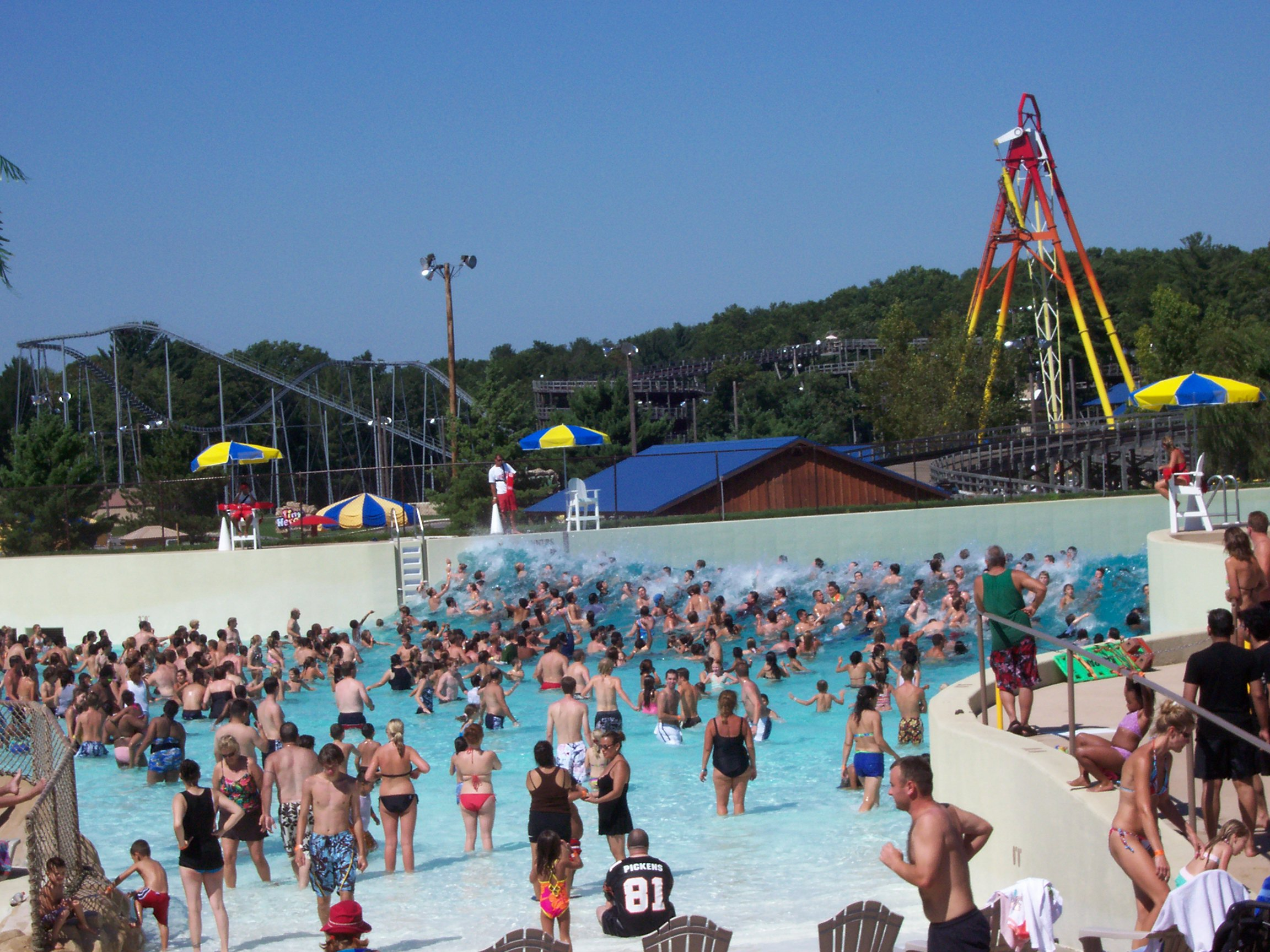
Poseidon's Rage wave pool in 2007

- Icaria Splash 'N Slide – A collection of water play features and eight children's water slides. Opened in 2024.
- Poseidon's Rage – A wave pool
- Lost City Of Atlantis – A water play area
- Great Pool of Delphi – A swimming pool with water features
- The River Troy – A lazy river
- Tidal Wave – A wave pool

==== Former attractions ====
- Blue Magnum Mat Slides – Mat water slides (formerly body slides named Wipeout, Kamikaze, Corkscrew, and Twister)
- Comet – A children's water slide
- Deuces Wild – A tube water slide
- Double Barrel – An enclosed tube water slide
- Double Trouble – A tube water slide
- Lightning – An enclosed speed water slide
- Little Dipper – A children's water slide
- Thunder – A speed water slide
- Bumper Boats – A bumper boats ride
- Demon's Drop – A body water slide
- Dragon's Tail – A water slide
- Huck's Lagoon – An interactive children's water play area featuring six water slides and multi-level structures. It was demolished in 2021 to make way for Medusa's Slidewheel.

=== Indoor water park ===
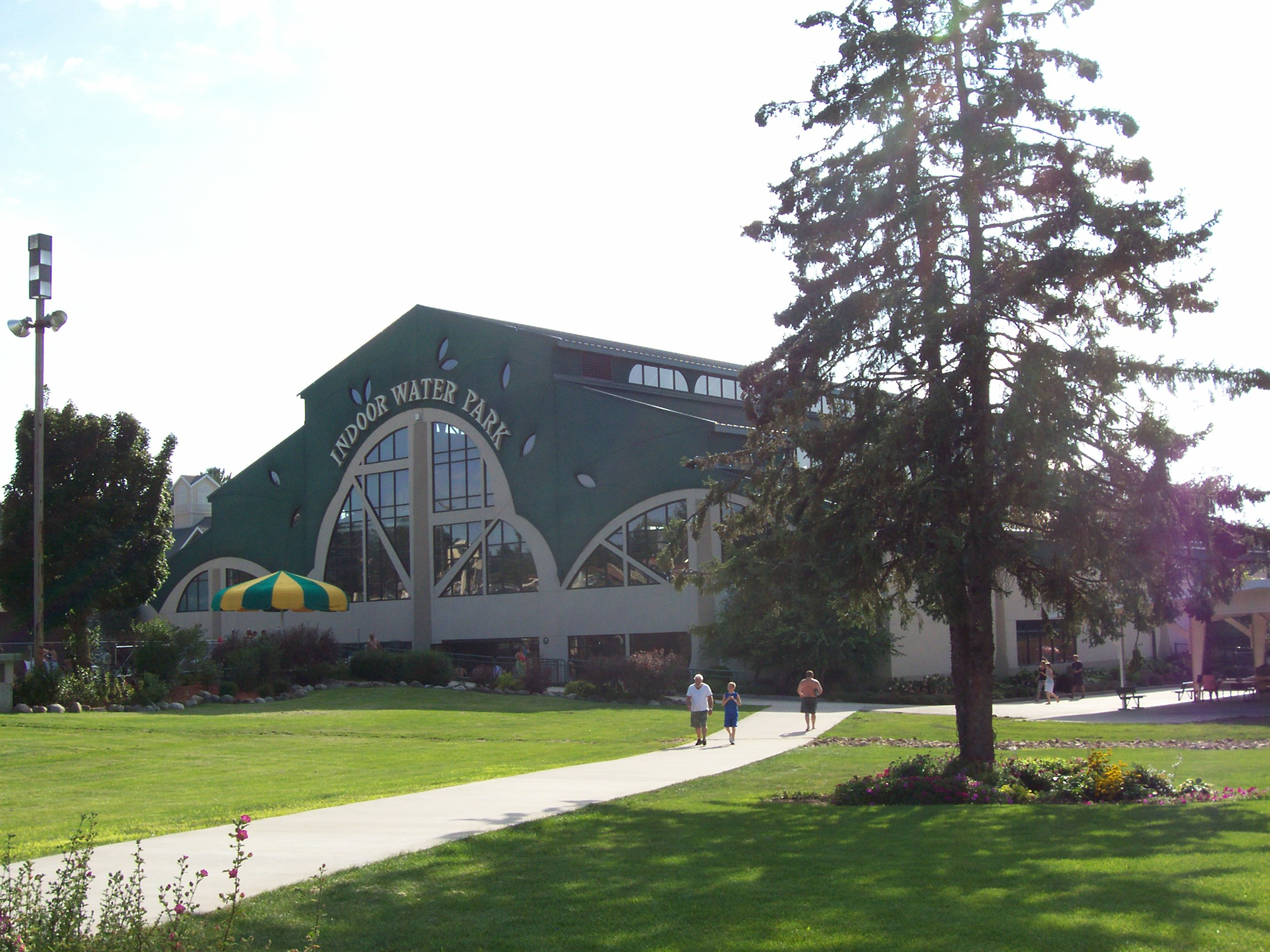
The indoor water park building in 2007

==== Water slides ====
- Cerberus Tube Slide – A tube water slide
- Hydra Body Slide – A body water slide
- Medusa's Shipwreck – A children's water play area with five water slides
- Medusa's Slidewheel – A WhiteWater West SlideWheel water slide. Opened in 2022.

==== Other attractions ====
- Hydra's Pool – A swimming pool
- River Styx – A lazy river
- Scylla's Pool – A swimming pool
- Serpent's Pool – A children's water play area
- The Fire Pool – A hot tub
- The Divine Warming Pool – A hot tub

==== Former attractions ====
- Cobra – An enclosed body water slide. Removed to make way for Medusa's Slidewheel.
- Diamondback – A body water slide. Removed to make way for Medusa's Slidewheel.

== Incidents ==
- On March 6, 2014, a lap bar malfunction caused by inadequate maintenance occurred on the Opa roller coaster in the indoor theme park, causing a 63-year-old man from Fremont, Wisconsin, to fall 17 feet from the ride, sustaining serious injuries that left him in a coma for three weeks. The ride was removed following the incident.
- On January 23, 2015, a four-year-old nearly drowned in the indoor water park. Emergency services responded and took the child to nearby St. Clair Hospital. Three months after the incident, the Dells-Delton EMS team presented Mt. Olympus and the lifeguards involved in rescuing the child with certificates for life-saving efforts.
- On July 9, 2015, an elastic cable snapped on the Catapult reverse bungee ride located in the outdoor theme park. A video of the incident was uploaded to Facebook and was widely circulated. Mt. Olympus removed the ride from the park two days later.
