= National Archaeological Museum of Taranto =

- Museo archeologico nazionale di Taranto
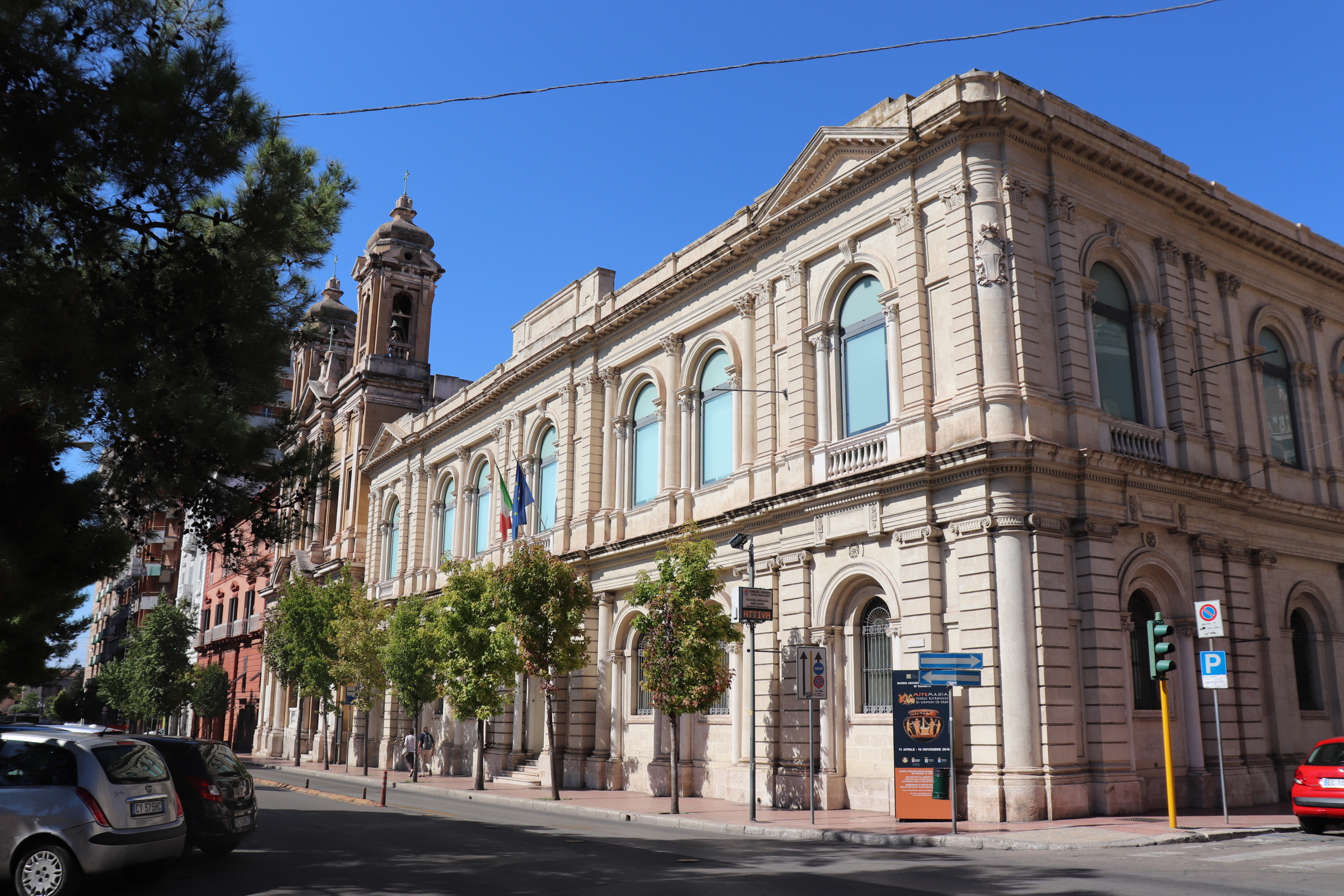
- Location: Taranto, Italy
- Coordinates: 40.4735°N 17.2386°E
- Type: museum

The National Archaeological Museum of Taranto (MArTA) is an Italian museum in Taranto, Italy. It exhibits one of the largest collections of artifacts from the Magna Graecia, including the Gold of Taranto. The museum is operated by the Ministry for Cultural Heritage and Activities of Italy.

== Some excavated items ==
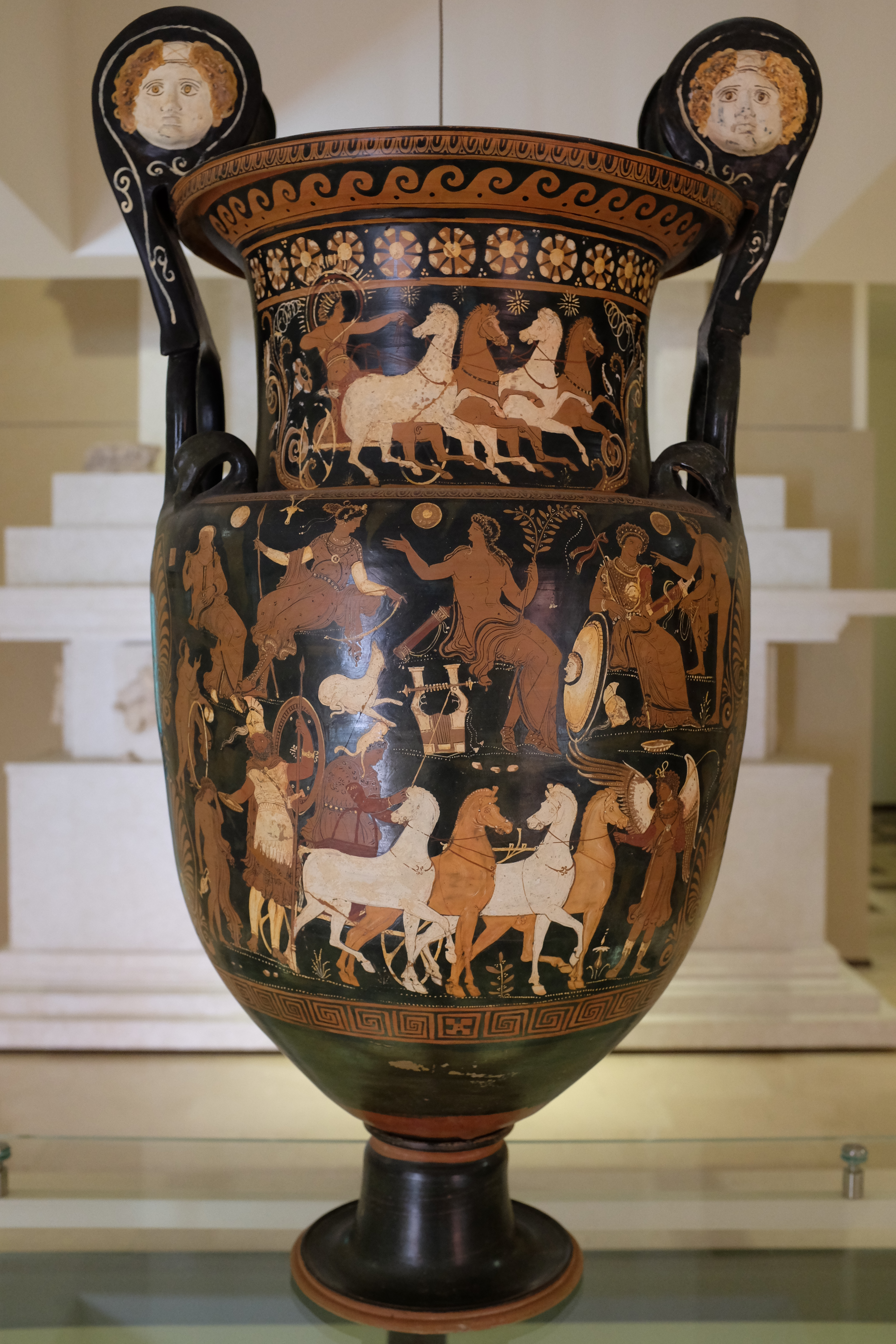
A Greek vase

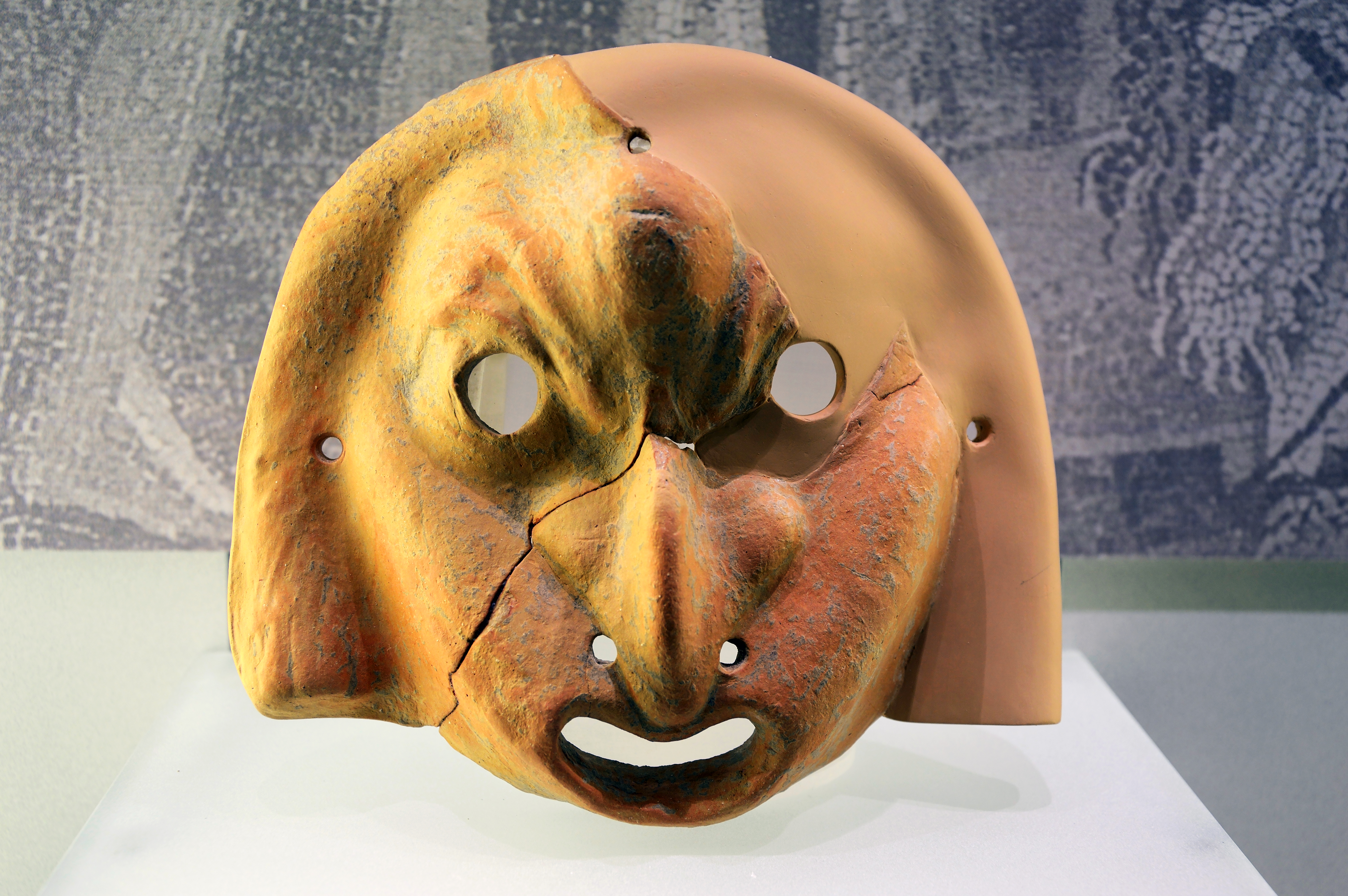
A greek mask in terracotta

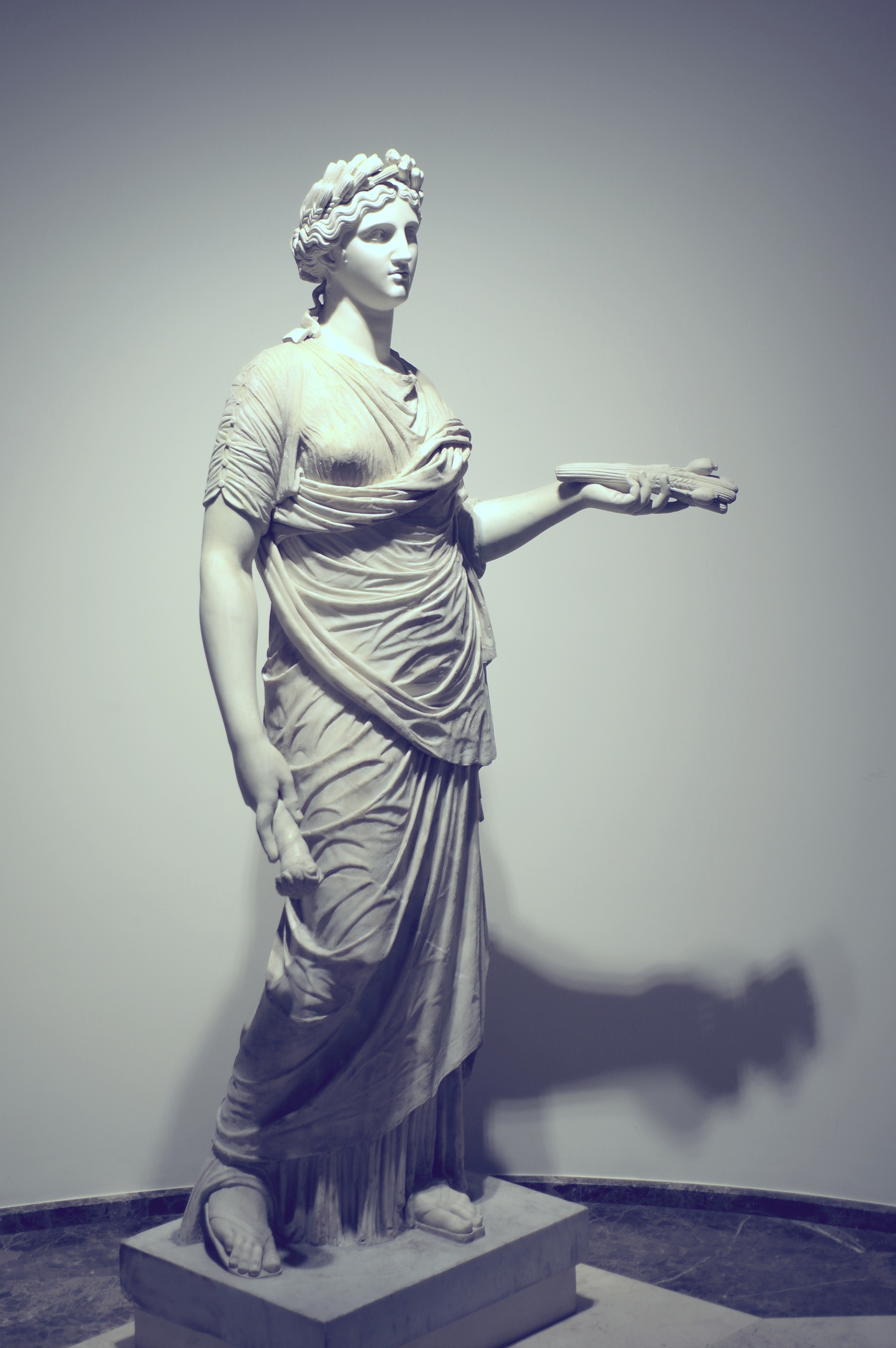
A Roman statue

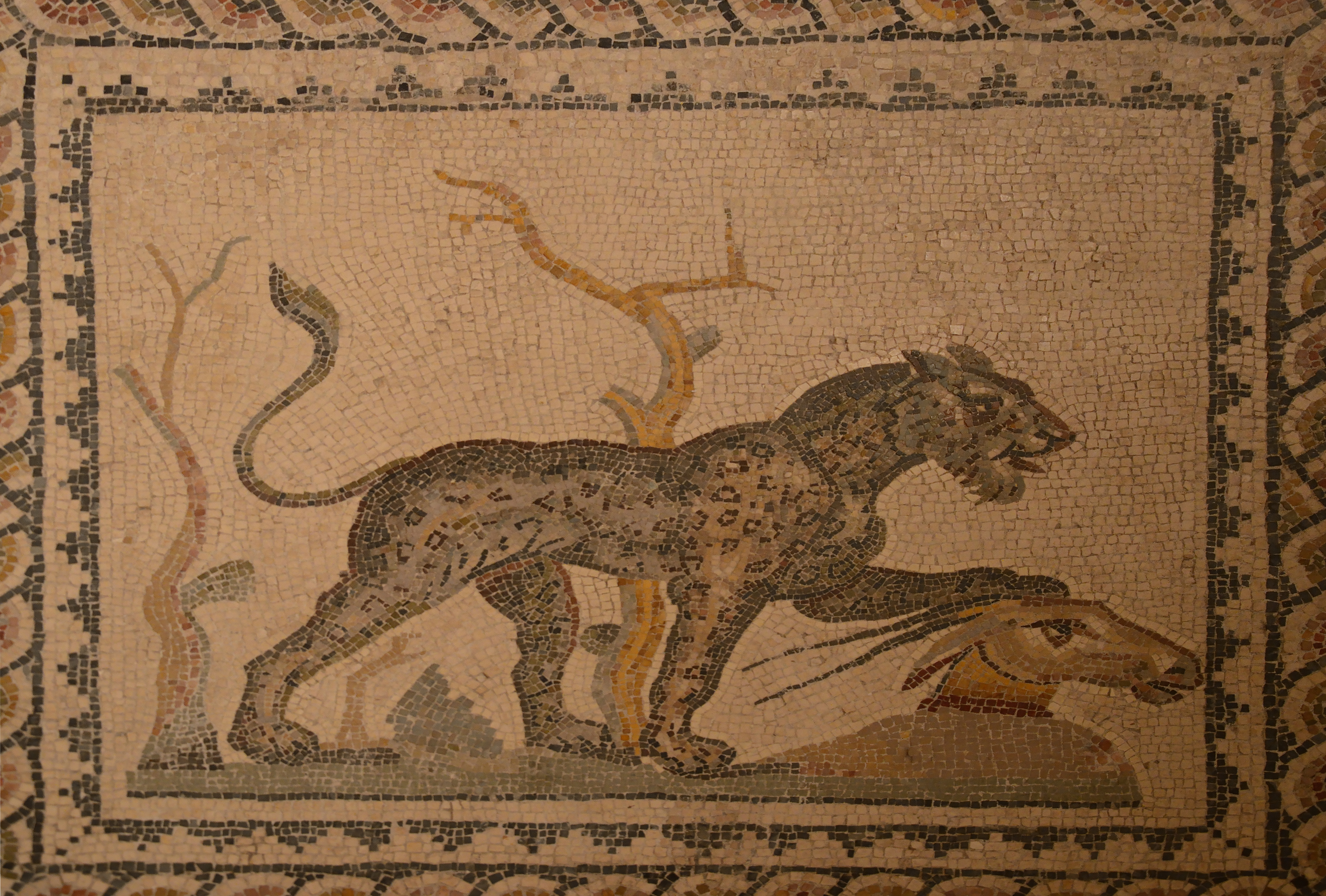
A Roman mosaic

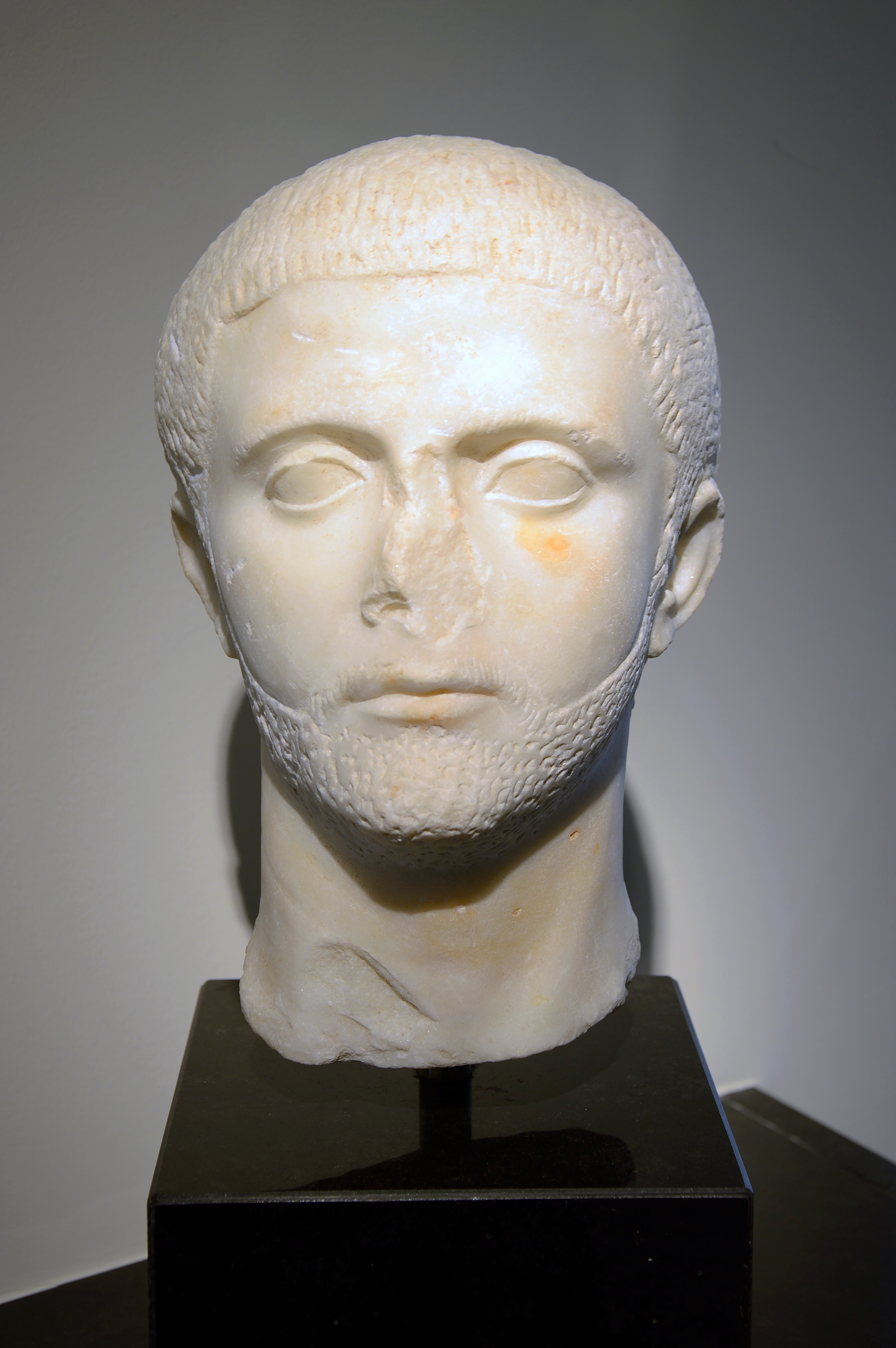
Head of a man

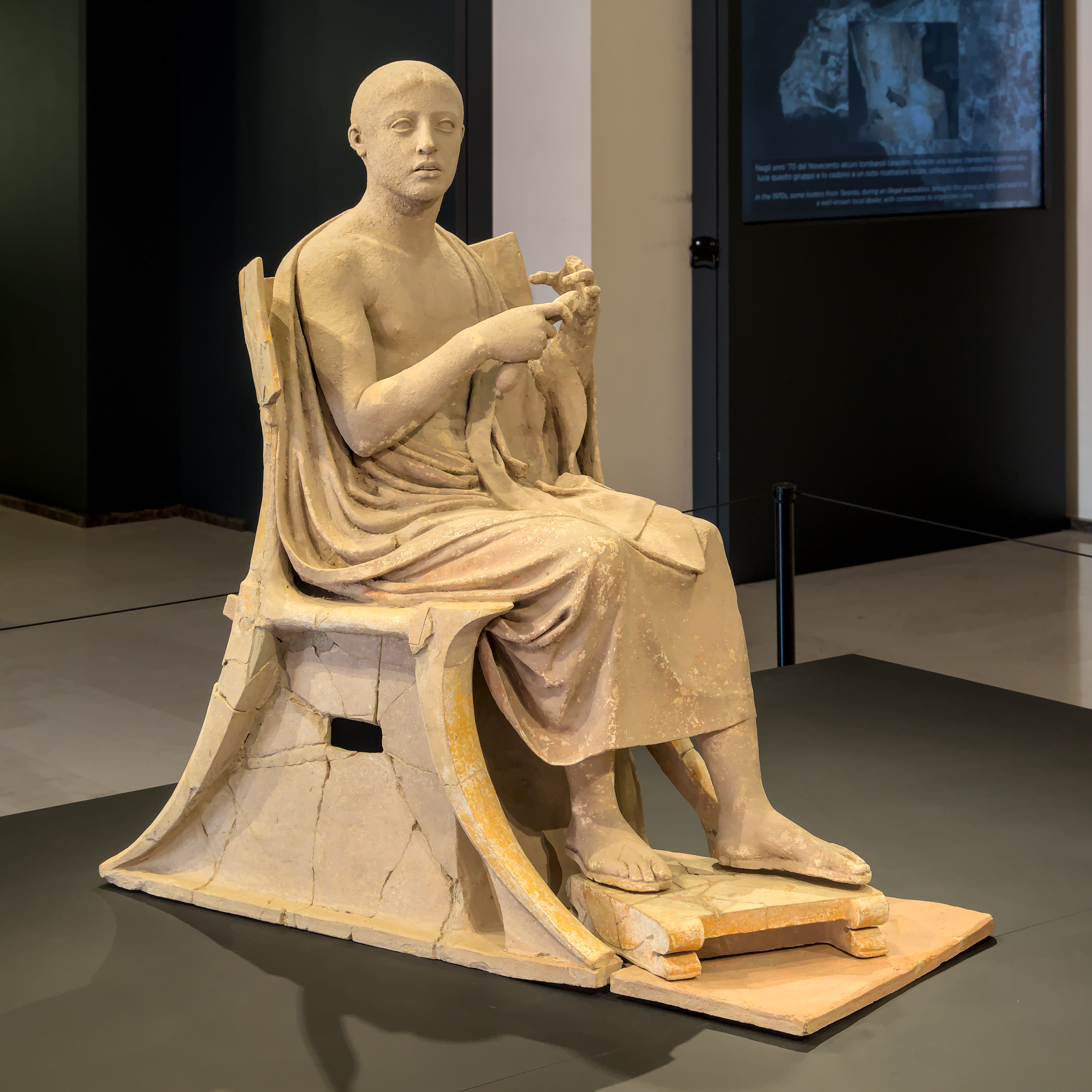
Statue of Orpheus, part of the sculptural group of Orpheus and the sirens, 4th c. BC

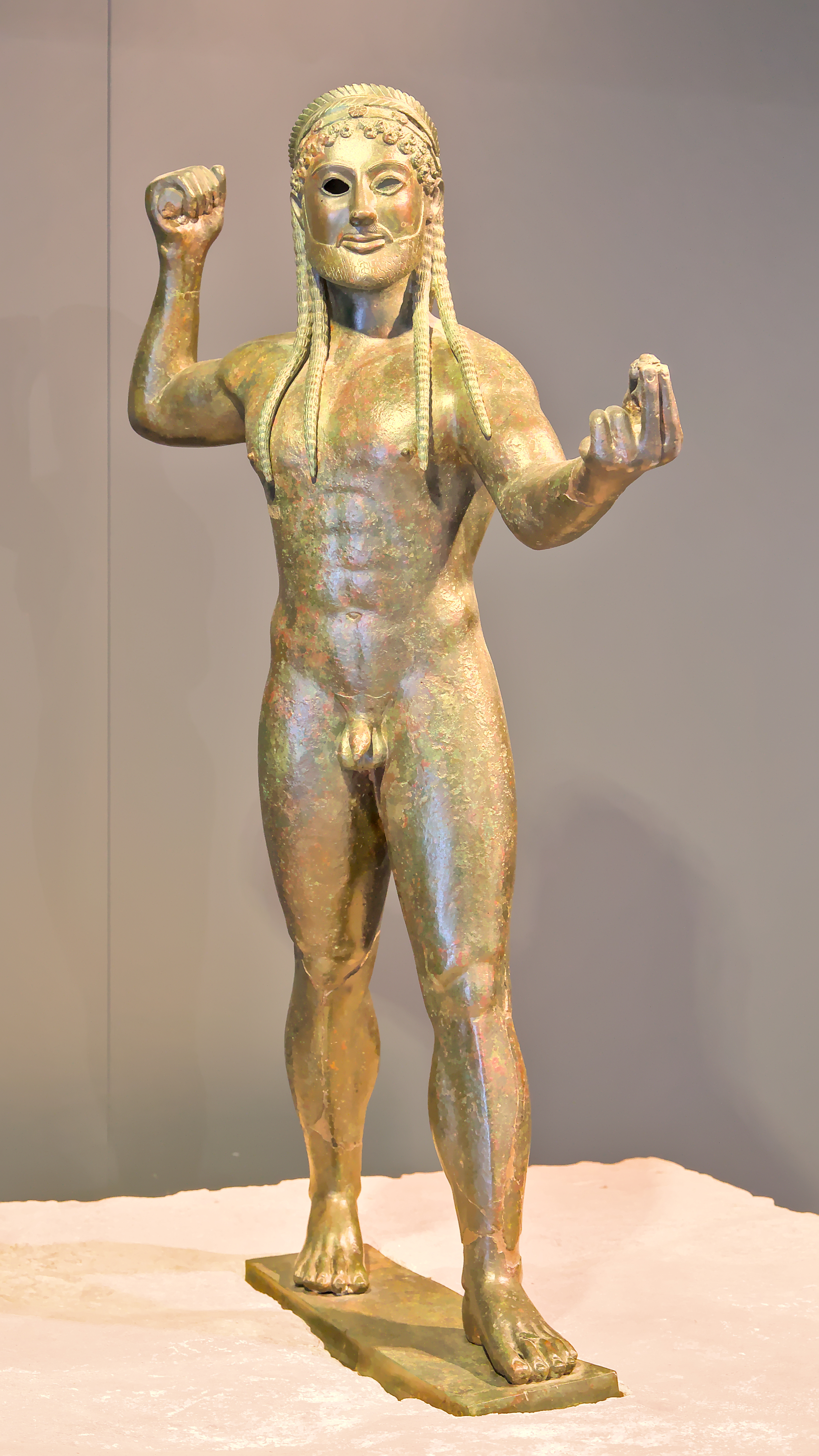
Bronze statue of Zeus, known as "Zeus of Ugento", around 530 BC

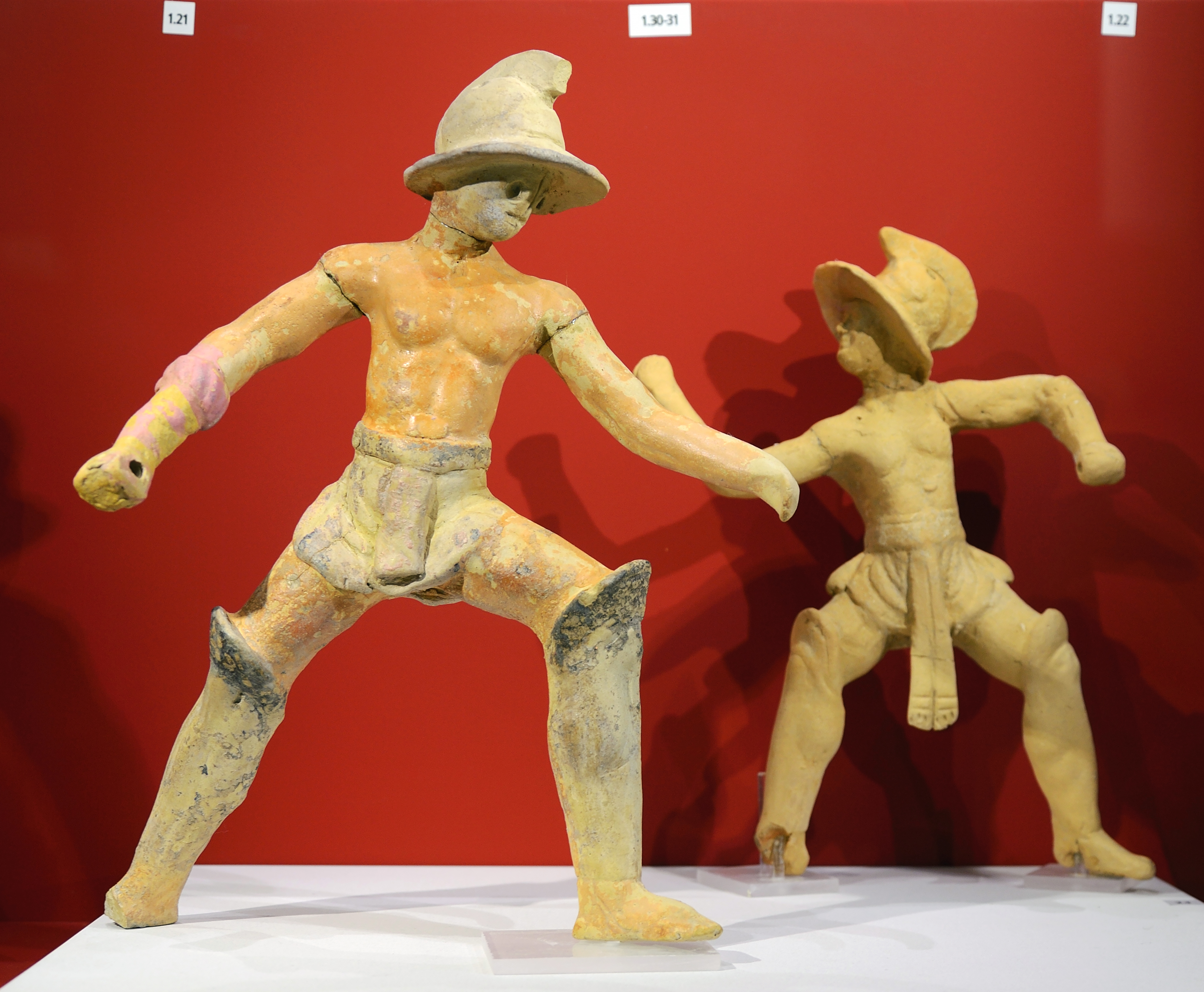
Terracotta statues of gladiators

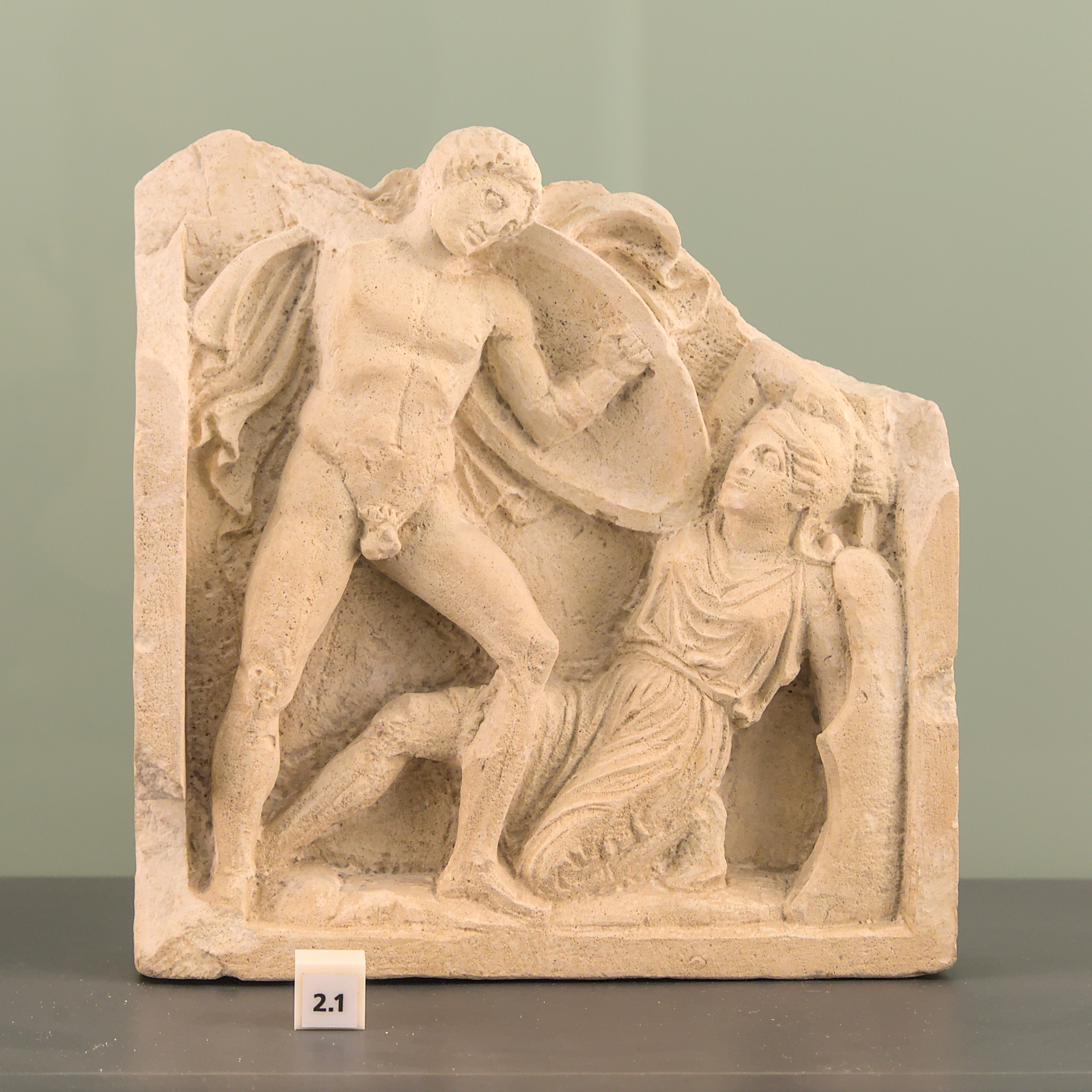
Metope depicting a battle scene between a Greek warrior and an amazon, 3rd c. BC

== See also ==
- The New Archaeological Museum of Ugento
- Gnatia

== Sources ==
- Quintino Quagliati. Il Museo Nazionale di Taranto. Istituto Poligrafico dello Stato.
