= Speziale =

- Frazione
- Location of Speziale in Italy
- Coordinates: 40°47′29″N 17°27′34.99″E
- Country: Italy
- Region: Apulia
- Province: Brindisi (BR)
- Comune: Fasano

Population (2011)
  - Total: 423
- Demonym: Spezialesi
- Time zone: UTC+1 (CET)
  - Summer (DST): UTC+2 (CEST)
- Postal code: 72015
- Dialing code: (+39) 080
- Patron saint: Our Lady of the Rosary
- Saint day: 7 October

Speziale is an Italian village and hamlet (frazione) of the municipality of Fasano in the Province of Brindisi, Apulia. As of 2011 its population was 423.

== History ==
The village takes its name from an apothecary (it: speziale) who once lived there.

== Geography ==
Located in upper Salento, Speziale lies a few kilometres from the sea and the hills of the Itria Valley. The surrounding area is notable for large plantations of secular (i.e. long-lived) olive trees.

== Architecture ==
The village has farmhouses and typical Apulian white-painted buildings. Its church, dedicated to Santa Maria del Rosario, was built in the early twentieth century.

== Events ==
Every year, on the first Sunday of August, the town holds a festival, the Sagra della focaccia.

== See also ==
- Egnatia
- Torre Canne
