= Torre Canne =

- Frazione
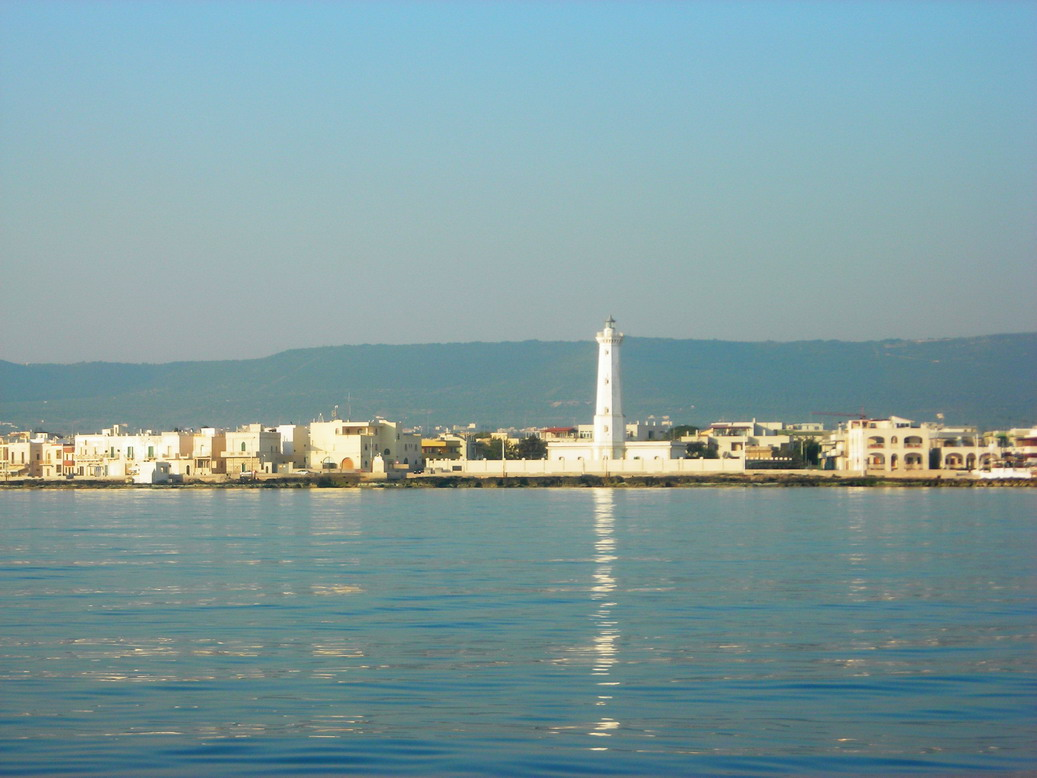
- Punta Torre Canne Lighthouse

- Location of Torre Canne in Italy
- Coordinates: 40°50′30.8″N 17°28′8″E
- Country: Italy
- Region: Apulia
- Province: Brindisi (BR)
- Comune: Fasano
- Elevation: 4 m (13 ft)

Population (2011)
  - Total: 448
- Demonym: Torresi
- Time zone: UTC+1 (CET)
  - Summer (DST): UTC+2 (CEST)
- Postal code: 72015
- Dialing code: (+39) 080
- Patron saint: Sacred Heart
- Website: www.torrecannedifasano.it

Torre Canne is a southeastern Italian coastal village and hamlet (frazione) of the municipality of Fasano in the Province of Brindisi, Apulia. As of 2011 its population was 448.

== History ==
The village received some attention from the German media on October 23 1985, when serial killer Norbert Poehlke, and his son Gabriel, were found dead of bullet wounds in what appeared to be a murder-suicide. Poehlke was a police officer in the German state of Baden-Württemberg, who murdered three motorists and used their cars in bank robberies across the state. He was dubbed 'Der Hammermörder' (The Hammer-Killer) because of his use of sledgehammers during the robberies, although his identity would not be revealed until after his suicide. Poehlke had also shot dead his wife and another son, Adrian, before fleeing with Gabriel to Italy; police found their bodies at the family home in Backnang three days prior to Poehlke's suicide.

== Geography ==
Torre Canne is located on the Adriatic Coast, between Savelletri and Rosa Marina, 11 km east of Fasano. It is 20 km far from Ostuni, 24 from Monopoli, 26 from Martina Franca, 54 from Brindisi, 62 from Taranto and 67 from Bari.

== Economy ==
The biggest industry of the village is fishing. Tourism, related to the sea and to the local spa, increased in the second half of the 20th century.

== Main sights ==
=== Other ===
In the village is located a spa, named "Terme di Torre Canne", opened in latest 19th century.

== Transport ==
Cisternino station, on the Adriatic railway, is few km from the village. The SS 16 highway "Adriatica" Padova-Otranto serves it with the exit "Torre Canne".

== People ==
- Norbert Poehlke (1951–1985), a German serial killer, committed suicide in Torre Canne

== See also ==
- Egnatia
- Speziale
