= Norbert Poehlke =

German robber and murderer (1951–1985)

- Born: Norbert Hans Poehlke; 15 September 1951; Stuttgart, West Germany
- Died: 22 October 1985 (aged 34); Torre Canne, Brindisi, Italy
- Cause of death: Suicide by gunshot
- Other name: "The Hammer-Killer"
- Motive: Robbery

Details
- Victims: 6
- Span of crimes: 1984–1985
- Country: West Germany, Italy
- State: Baden-Württemberg
- Weapon: Walther P5 pistol

Norbert Hans Poehlke (15 September 1951 – 22 October 1985), also known as The Hammer-Killer (Der Hammermörder), was a German police officer and serial killer who committed four bank robberies and six murders between 1984 and 1985. His nickname was derived from his modus operandi of using a sledgehammer in bank robberies in which he would use his victims' cars as getaway vehicles.

Wrongly believing that he was about to be exposed as a criminal, Poehlke killed his wife and eldest son before fleeing the country with his younger son. He stayed on the run for three days before killing his child and himself while hiding in Italy.

== Early life ==
Poehlke was a police officer in Baden-Württemberg, employed from 1982 as a high-ranking sergeant of Mühlhausen am Neckar's canine division. After winning 36,000 Deutsche Mark from the lottery, he built a house for his family (consisting of his wife, two sons and a daughter) in the village of Strümpfelbach in Backnang, where he took care of the finances. After the construction of the family home, the family became heavily indebted. In March 1984, his daughter Cordula died from a brain tumour at the age of three.

== Crimes ==
After Cordula's death, Poehlke began a series of murders and bank robberies, three of which proceeded in the same pattern: First, he lured a random victim in a remote rest area to get into his vehicle. He killed his victims with his service weapon, a Walther P5, by shooting them in the head. After the crime, he would drive with the stolen vehicle to a bank to rob them. Masked, he smashed the windows of the ticket counter with a sledgehammer, robbed cash, and then escaped with the victim’s vehicle.

The series of murders displaced the residents of Heilbronn-Ludwigsburg for more than a year. The unknown perpetrator was soon dubbed in the media as the "Hammer-Killer", although the sledgehammer was not the actual murder weapon.

On 3 May 1984, 47-year-old engineer and commercial traveller Siegfried Pfitzer from Aschaffenburg was found dead, shot in the head, at a highway rest stop in Marbach. His car, found a quarter-mile from his body, was linked to a bank robbery the same day in Erbstetten. The assailant had smashed the teller window with a sledgehammer, and taken the money on the other side. Despite extensive police investigations, the initial search for the perpetrator was unsuccessful.

On 21 December, 37-year-old Eugene Wethey, an English expatriate living in Nuremberg, was found shot dead in a rest stop near Grossbottwar. A week later, Wethey's car was used in a bank robbery in Cleebronn by a man wielding a sledgehammer.

On 22 July 1985, 26-year-old Wilfried Scheider was found shot dead in a parking lot in Beilstein-Schmidhausen. He was shot with a Walther P5 pistol, a common police-issue pistol. The victim's car was found at the scene of a bank robbery in Spiegelberg.

== Investigation ==
The subsequently formed SOKO "Hammer", whose headquarters were in the Bottwar school centre, led the largest operation in West Germany's post-war period. In the next four months, 540 clues were investigated and 1,400 people were questioned.

On 5 July 1985, the lead police station in Stuttgart publicly announced on the Aktenzeichen XY… ungelöst program that they requested help from viewers. After the show, in which a movie was used to reconstruct the previous murders and raids, the criminal police did not receive any decisive information from the public. It is believed that Poehlke's wife had seen the broadcast.

On 29 September 1985, while searching a Ludwigsburg railway station for bombs, anti-terrorist officers found a police uniform in one of the lockers. The uniform was traced to detective chief superintendent Norbert Poehlke, a veteran officer of 14 years in Stuttgart. Poehlke said it had been left there after a quick change for a family member's funeral. Police became suspicious when they discovered no recent family deaths, but that his daughter had died of cancer in 1984.

The investigation was picking up when, on 14 October, Poehlke requested, and got, some sick leave. Several days later police went to his home to ask him some questions regarding the murders and robberies. With no one answering, and fearing Poelhke had fled, the police entered the house. What they found was Poelhke's wife shot twice in the head in the bathroom and in one of the bedrooms was his son Adrian, also shot dead.

Three days later, on 23 October, Poehlke and his other son, Gabriel, were found shot dead, a clear murder-suicide, in his car at Torre Canne, a village near Brindisi, Italy. Poehlke's pistol was confirmed as the murder weapon in the murders, and the case was closed.

== In the media ==
Prominent German screenwriter Fred Breinersdorfer, together with Elke R. Evert, wrote a book titled The Hammer Murderer in 1986. A documentary novel was also written, and a play based on the case was made in 1989. A feature film Der Hammermörder, starring Christian Redl and Ulrike Kriener in the lead roles, was broadcast on ZDF in 1990 and won the Grimme-Preis Award the following year.

In 1999, the German TV series Die Cleveren broadcast an episode titled "Greed", leaning on details from the Poehlke case; these include, for example, the killer's modus operandi being stealing vehicles and the main suspect being an investigating officer.

In 2001, the ARD broadcast a documentary about the Poehlke case under the title The Hammer-Killer - blood trail of a police officer in the 'Die großen Kriminalfälle series, which reconstructed the case based on investigation files and numerous witness accounts.

== See also ==
- List of German serial killers

== Bibliography ==
- Fuchs, Christian [1996] (2002). Bad Blood: An Illustrated Guide to Psycho Cinema. Creation Books. ISBN 1-84068-025-3
- Wetsch, Elisabeth. POEHLKE, Norbert Hans Serial Killers True Crime Library. Retrieved on 2007-10-03
- Fred Breinersdorfer, Elke R. Evert: The Hammer Killer. A documentary novel. Factor publishing house, Stuttgart 1986, ISBN 3-925860-00-2
- Martin Jung: "The Hammer Killer" - Police master Norbert Poehlke. In: Klaus Schönberger (ed.): Vabanque. Bank robbery, theory, practice, history. Berlin/Göttingen 2000, ISBN 3-922611-83-4
