= The New Archaeological Museum of Ugento =

New Archaeological Museum of Ugento
- Museo civico archeologico di Ugento
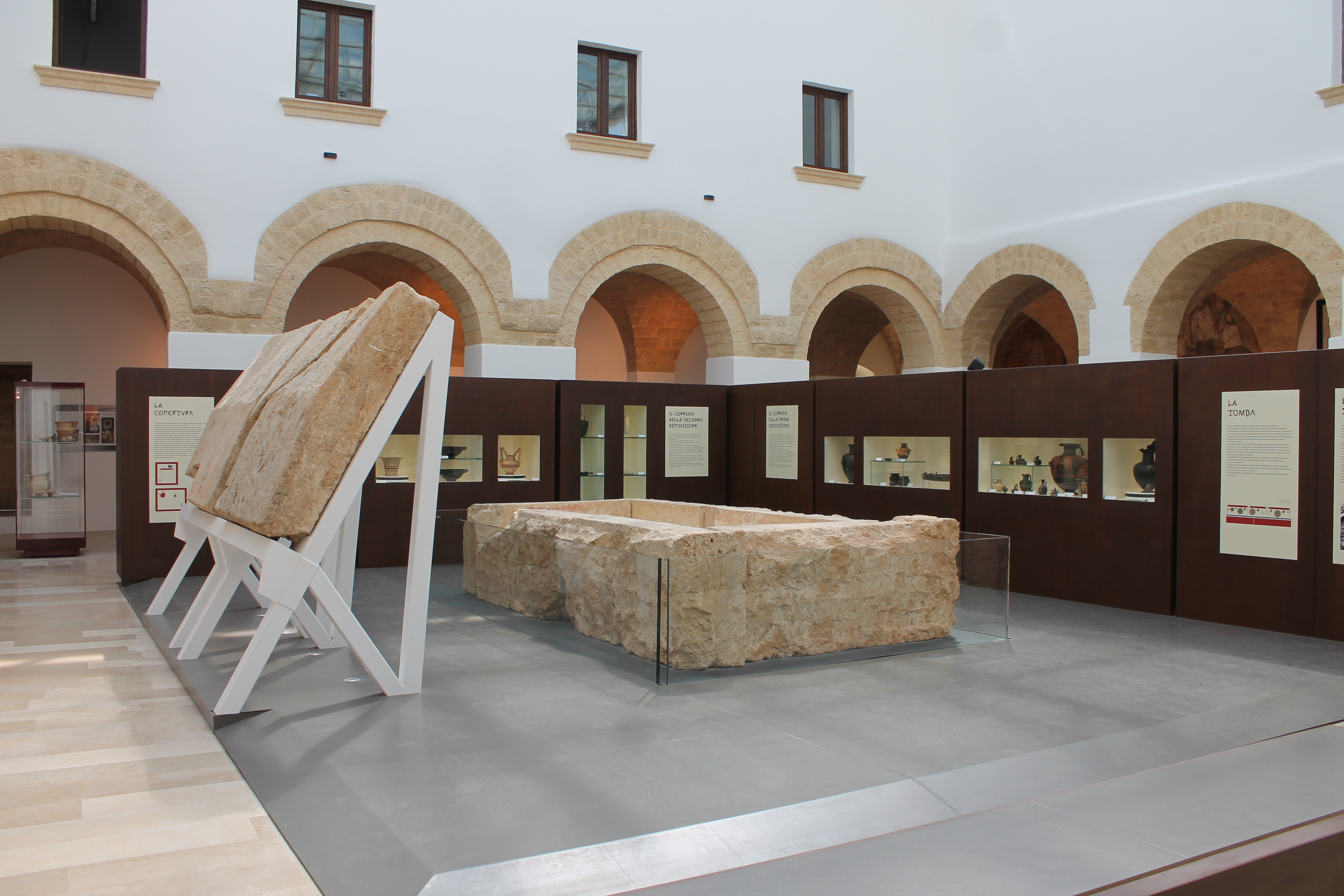
- Location: Ugento, Italy
- Coordinates: 39°55′44″N 18°09′39″E
- Type: museum

The New Archaeological Museum is an Italian civic museum set up in the former convent of Santa Maria della Pietà of the Observant Friars Minor, in Ugento in the province of Lecce.

== History ==
The convent was built in the 15th century probably by the architect Francesco Colaci da Surbo. The structure remained a place of prayer and worship until 1866 when, following the unification of Italy and by virtue of the law on the suppression of religious congregations (royal decree 3036), the monastery was devolved to the State property and used as a barracks for real Carabinieri. Later, the premises of the former monastery were transformed into classrooms and municipal offices. The intended use of the convent changed again when, in 1961, the bronze statue of Zeus was found, completely by chance. Thus, in 1968, the Civic Museum of Archeology and Paleontology was founded, which, following the long restoration work, completed in 2009, took on the name of "New Archaeological Museum".

== Architectural Description ==
The architectural structure is austere, in accordance with the model of Franciscan life. An essential convent, with the central cloister surrounded by the refectory and service rooms, small cells and a library on the first floor, which was decorated in the eighteenth century and called the Sala del Priore. Attached to the convent is the church of Santa Maria della Pietà, which once donated to the Congregation of Our Lady of Sorrows was dedicated to Saint Anthony of Padua. In the first half of the 17th century, this one underwent some alterations. To resize the cult building a side wall was built which created a cavity between the cloister and the church itself. This remodeling completely erased the pictorial cycle of the side chapels of the church, which came to light following the latest restoration work. The walled chapels open today to the right of the old main entrance, near the church, and can be visited.

=== The chapels of the sixteenth century ===
The first chapel depicts the Madonna of Constantinople seated on the throne between San Bonaventura and San Francesco da Paola, dated 1598. In the lower part there is a fake balustrade with small columns from which a spiral design runs along the entire arch. In the centre, the medical saints Cosma and Damiano are depicted, separated by a quadrangular niche in which two sacred ampoules are depicted. In the second Chapel stands the Madonna del Latte: below the same Marian iconography there is a part of the fresco that bears a fleet of galleys, a clear reference to the Naval Battle of Lepanto in 1571. Under the tondo depicting the Coronation of the Virgin is there is an inscription bearing the name of the client Donna Aurelia Perreca. The fresco cycle is completed by a sixteenth-century iconography of the Virgin of the Rosary and by a part of the fresco depicting the Medici Saints Cosma and Damiano. The third is dedicated to the Annunciation, with frescoes depicting the Virgin Mary, St. Nicholas and St. Anthony of Padua. The fourth chapel is dedicated to the Crucifixion, with frescoes depicting the Desolate Virgin, St. John the Evangelist, the Cyrenean who takes the Cross of Christ on his shoulders and other representations relating to the passion and death of Jesus Christ.

=== Frescoes of the eighteenth century ===
During the last restoration interventions, in the portico belonging to the Cloister of the former Convent of Santa Maria della Pietà, three frescoes also came to light which bear suppers of some prodigies performed by Sant'Antonio da Padova, in particular: the Miracle of the Mula and the Meeting between the Saint and Ezzelino III da Romano and the "conversion" of the latter. Lastly, this iconography belongs to the last decorative phase of the Convent of Santa Maria della Pietà, which today houses the museum collections, and is dated 1775. The author is unknown, while the reference to the client and the devoted Saverio Pisanello.

=== The refectory ===
The large hall of the refectory has a majestic eighteenth-century fresco depicting the Last Supper above which, inside an oval, the Immaculate Conception appears. the decoration of this room also includes a sixteenth-century monochromatic cycle that runs along the walls with scenes from Genesis: the separation from darkness, the creation of Adam and Eve, original sin, the expulsion from paradise, Adam at work, the construction of the 'Ark, the Great Flood and Noah's Sacrifice. Below, continuous decoration with vines, scrolls and allegorical figures executed between the end of the 1500s and the beginning of the 1600s.

=== Hall of the Prior ===
Originally the convent had a library, which in the early eighteenth century was frescoed and called the "prior's room". The coat of arms of the Franciscan bishop Lazaro y Terrez dominates the ceiling, supported by putti who return between the lunettes of the vault in which the Immaculate Conception and the saints of the Franciscan order alternate: Saint Bonaventure, Saint Francis of Assisi, Saint Anthony of Padua, St. Bernardine of Siena, St. Peter of Alcantara, St. John of Capestrano, St. Louis of Toulouse, St. Clare, St. Elizabeth of Hungary and St. Elizabeth of Portugal.

== Current exhibition criterion ==
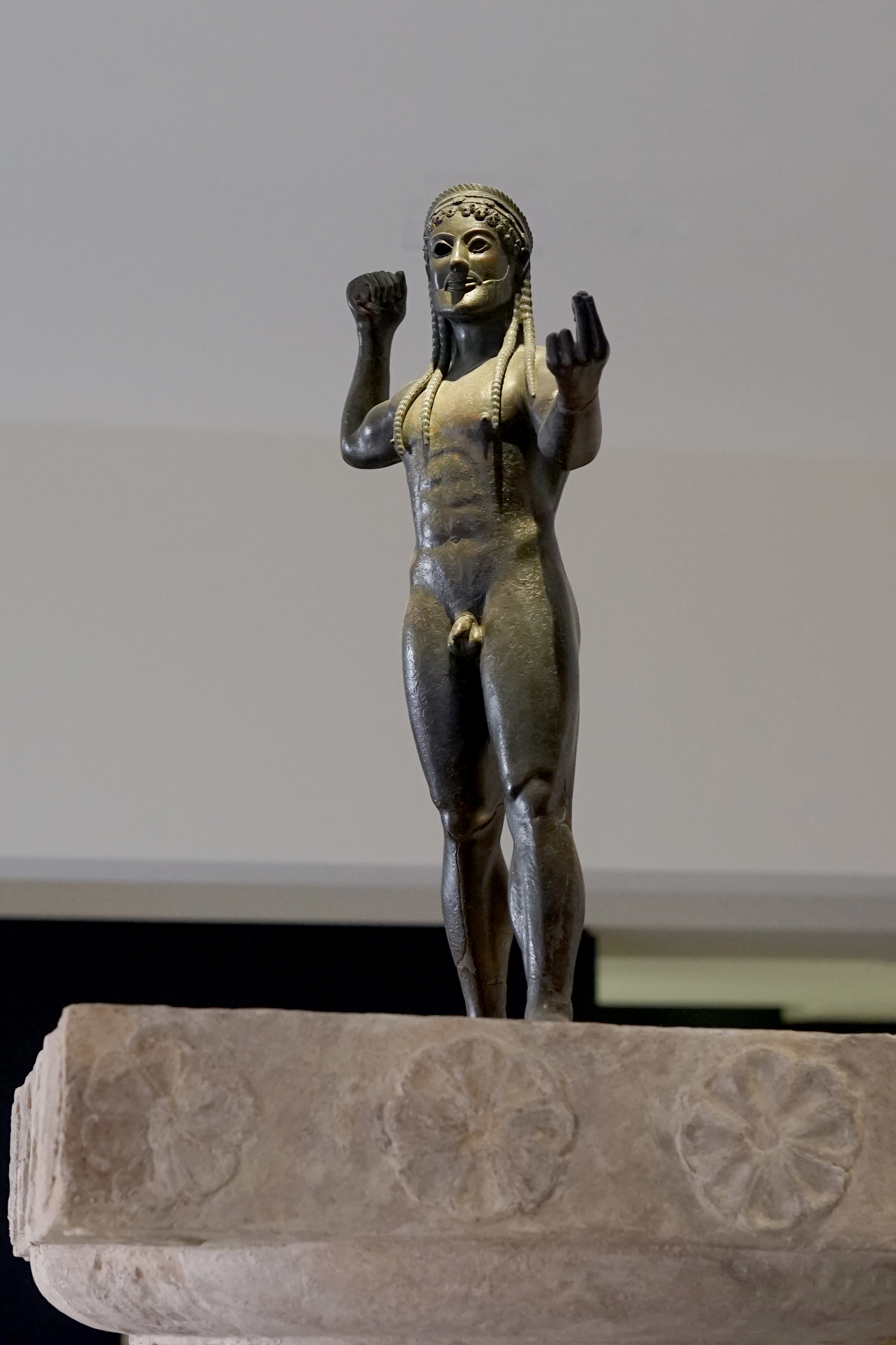
Zeus of Ugento

Currently the New Archaeological Museum is spread over two floors and houses finds ranging from Prehistory to the Middle Ages flanked by educational panels. The ground floor houses two of the most exceptional discoveries that have occurred since the sixties: the Tomb of the Athlete, discovered in 1970 in via Salentina and the reproduction of Zeus, a masterpiece of Magna Graecia bronzes, found in Ugento, in via Fabio Pittore in 1961 and kept in the National Archaeological Museum of Taranto. The first floor, in addition to the Antiquarium where all the finds from the old exhibition are kept, houses rooms dedicated to the necropolis of Ugento and the walls of the ancient city; other rooms are instead dedicated to the indigenous cults of Messapia. In fact, votive objects and terracotta statuettes dated to the Hellenistic Age from the ancient Ugentine port of Torre S. Giovanni, artifacts found in the archaic sanctuary of Monte Papalucio in Oria, casts of terracotta statuettes depicting archaic divinities are on display. Finally, on the upper floor, medieval ceramic objects of Ugento production, and coins are displayed, with particular attention to those belonging to the Ugento mint, and to the local prehistory and protohistory.

== See also ==
- National Archaeological Museum of Taranto
- Gnatia
