= Punta Torre Canne Lighthouse =

Lighthouse in Italy

Punta Torre Canne
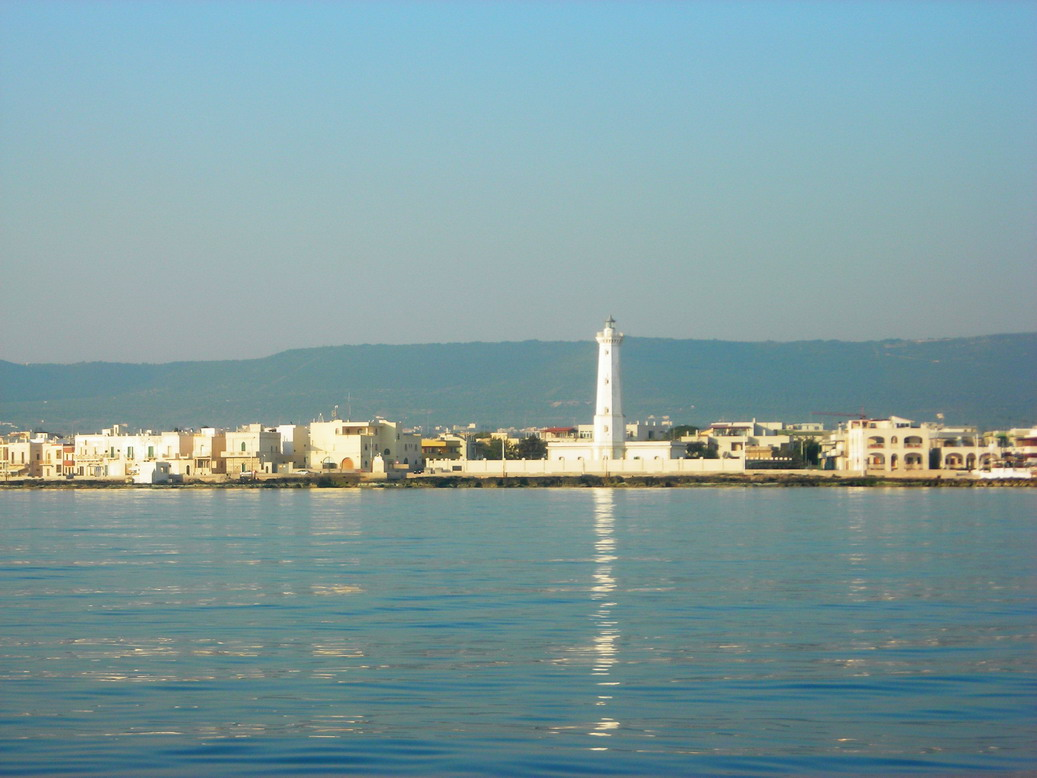
- Location: Punta Torre Canne; Fasano; Apulia
- Coordinates: 40°50′31″N 17°28′08″E

Tower
- Constructed: 1929
- Foundation: Concrete base
- Construction: Concrete tower
- Height: 32 metres (105 ft)
- Shape: Tapered octagonal prism tower with balcony and lantern attached to 1-storey keeper’s house
- Markings: white tower, metallic grey lantern dome
- Power source: mains electricity
- Operator: Marina Militare
- Heritage: Italian national heritage

Light
- Focal height: 35 metres (115 ft)
- Lens: type OR 500 focal length: 250 mm
- Intensity: AL 1000 W
- Range: main: 16 nautical miles (30 km; 18 mi) reserve: 12 nautical miles (22 km; 14 mi)
- Characteristic: Fl (2) W 10s.
- Italy no.: 3688 E.F.

Punta Torre Canne Lighthouse (Italian: Faro di Punta Torre Canne) is an active lighthouse in the homonymous village in the municipality of Fasano. The place takes the name from an ancient coastal tower built in the 16th century to protect the coast from the Turks, and from the presence of giant cane.

== Description ==
The lighthouse was built in 1929 in concrete and has a tapered octagonal prism with balcony and lantern attached to 1-storey keeper's house; the tower and the building are white painted. The tower is 32 metres (105 ft) high and the lantern is positioned at a height of 35 metres (115 ft) above sea level. The lantern emits two white flashes in a ten seconds period visible up to 16 nautical miles (30 km; 18 mi). The light is fully automated and managed by Marina Militare identified by the Country code number 3688 E.F.

== See also ==
- List of lighthouses in Italy
- Fasano
