= Eurofighter (Zoosafari Fasanolandia) =

Roller coaster

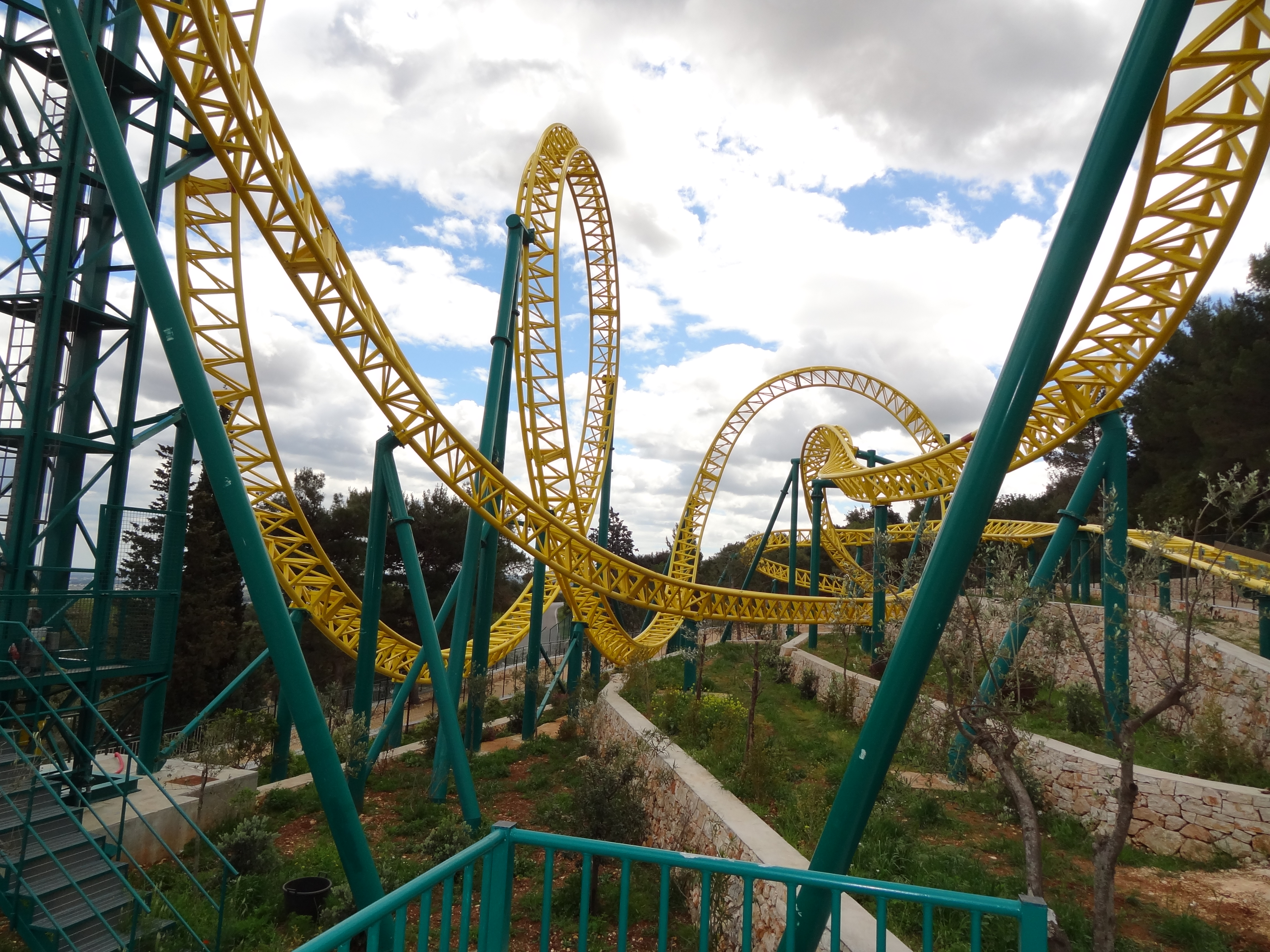

Zoosafari Fasanolandia
- Location: Zoosafari Fasanolandia
- Coordinates: 40.8303°N 17.3398°E
- Status: Operating
- Opening date: 6 August 2011
- Cost: €2,187,000

General statistics
- Type: Steel – Euro-Fighter
- Manufacturer: Gerstlauer
- Height: 23 m (75 ft)
- Length: 395 m (1,296 ft)
- Speed: 70 km/h (43 mph)
- Inversions: 2
- Max vertical angle: 97°
- Trains: a single car. Riders are arranged 4 across in 2 rows for a total of 8 riders per train.
- Eurofighter at RCDB

Eurofighter is a steel roller coaster at Zoosafari Fasanolandia in Fasano, Italy. Eurofighter is the only Gerstlauer Euro-Fighter model roller coaster that bears the name of the coaster model. At 97 degrees, the coaster is also the steepest roller coaster in Italy.

== History ==
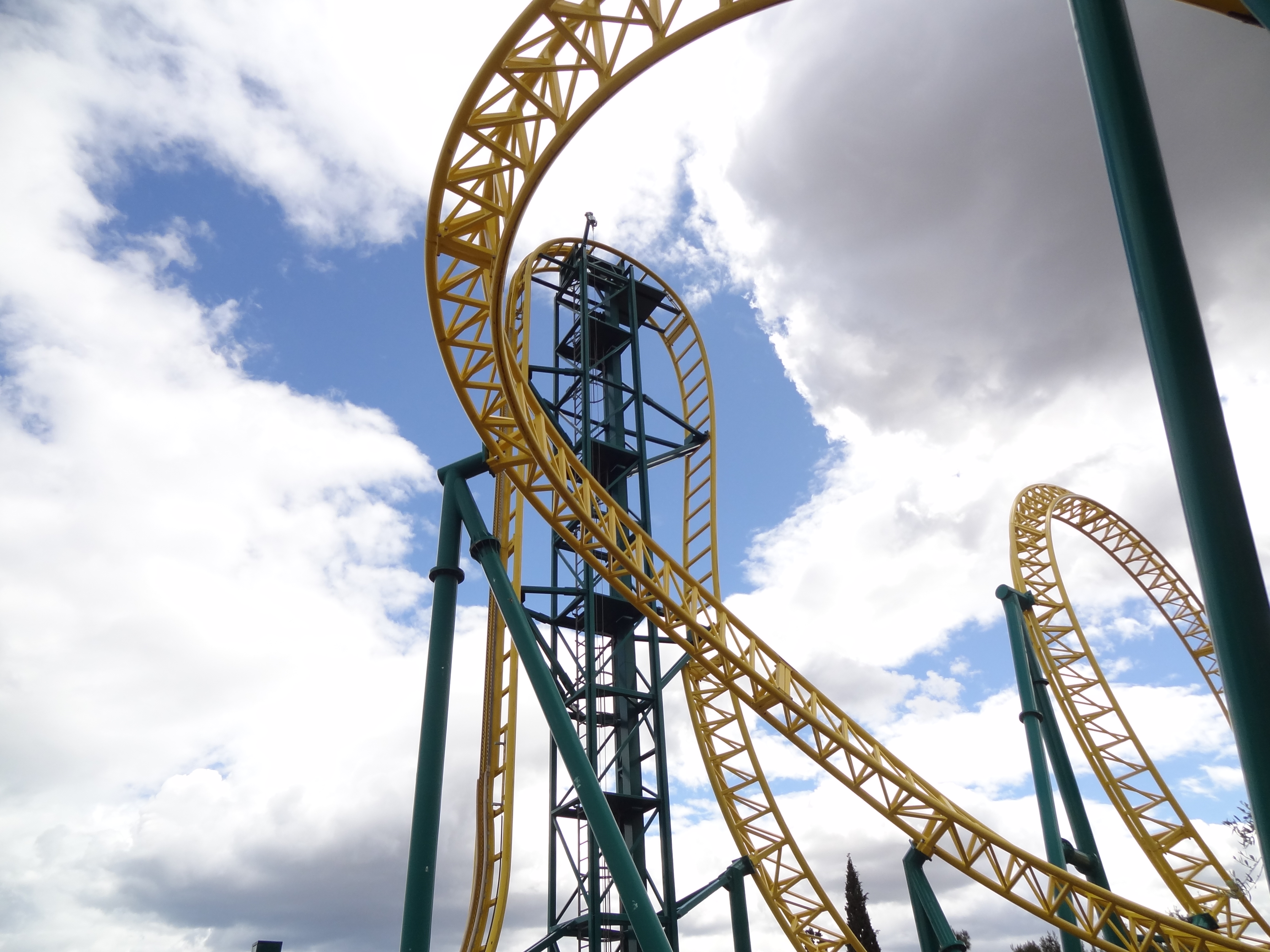
First drop on Eurofighter

Built by Gerstlauer, the installation of Eurofighter was delayed several years because of conflict between Zoosafari Fasanolandia and the city of Fasano. The coaster was purchased in 2007 for a total of €2,187,000, but when construction was about to begin, the local police intervened and blocked construction on 5 March 2007, claiming that there were issues with the building permits. Permits were eventually granted on 28 September 2009, and construction began on 15 December 2010. The coaster finally opened on 6 August 2011.

The delay in the construction led the park owners to seek compensation for the revenue that they claimed was lost as a result of the delay in coaster installation. The park owners demanded €3,000,000 from the city of Fasano, and threatened to remove the entire park and move its operations to Ravenna if its demands were not met. In addition, the park terminated more favorable admission rates for residents of Fasano.

The sign at the entrance of the attraction is misspelled, being written as 'Eurofigther' rather than the correct 'Eurofighter' from the Gerstlauer model the attraction derives its name from.

== Layout ==
Eurofighter has a similar layout to Rage, another Gerstlauer Euro-Fighter roller coaster at Adventure Island in Southend-On-Sea, Essex, UK, and has the steeper-than-vertical 97-degree drop characteristic of all Gerstlauer Euro-Fighters. The coaster is reported in some sources as having 2 inversions and in other sources as having 3 inversions. All sources describe the coaster as having a vertical loop and a roll (alternatively described as the often misidentified heartline roll or an inline twist), but some sources report that an overbanked curve in the coaster qualifies as an "inline loop".
