= Gold of Taranto =

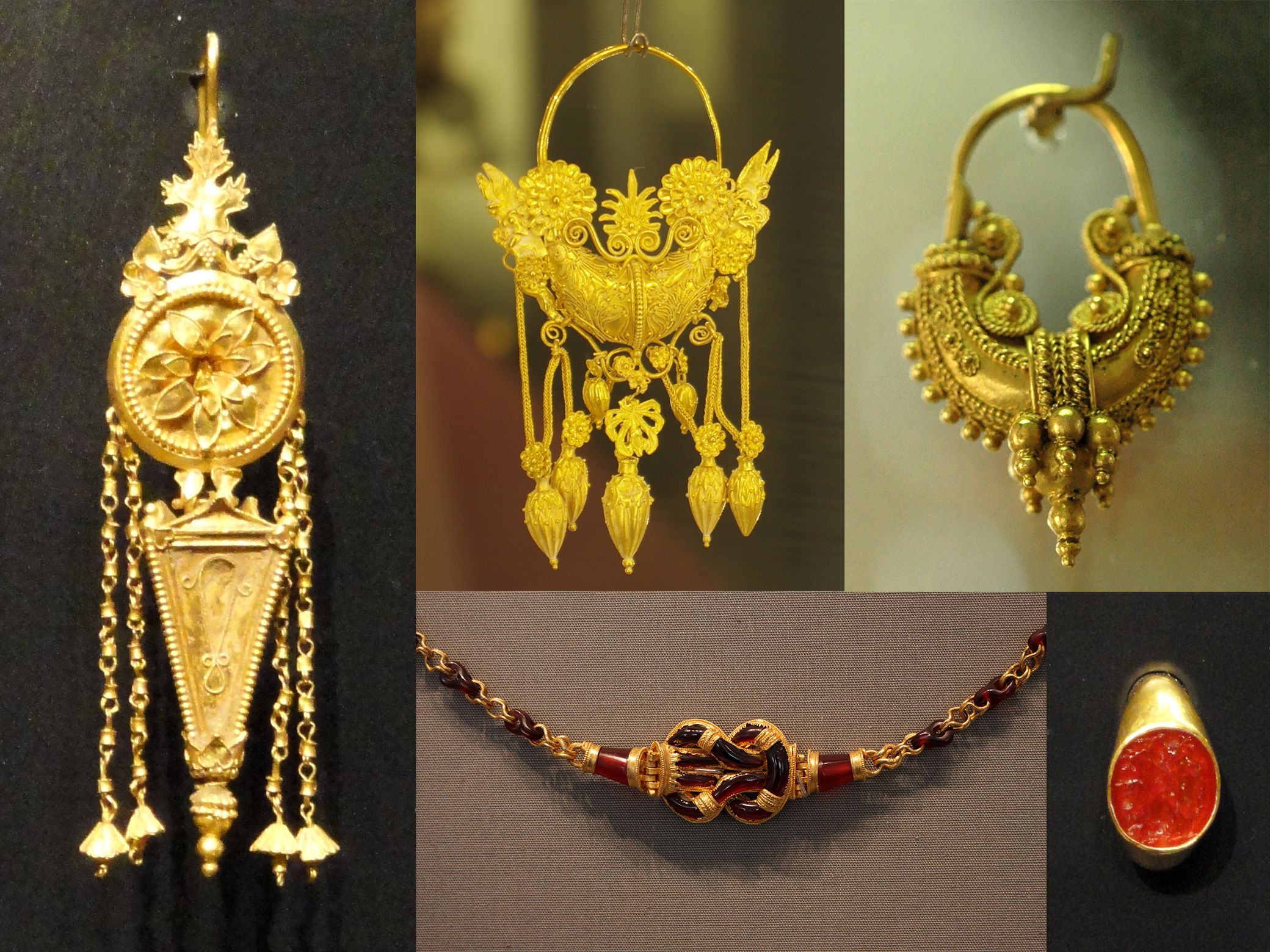
Golden jewellery, 4th-3rd century BC

The Gold of Taranto (Ori di Taranto) refers to a collection of jewellery from the Hellenistic and Roman periods. The jewels include gold rings, earrings, and bracelets. The collection is not from a single site or excavation, but several separate finds in the region. It is now in the National Archaeological Museum of Taranto in Italy. The collection has been displayed in various parts of the world.

The collection includes:

- Diadem from Canosa di Puglia in gold and semi-precious stones with floral motifs decoration;
- Lion head earrings;
- Boat shaped earrings;
- Nutcracker;
- Silver case from Canosa shaped like a shell.

The pieces represent the historical craftsmanship and the techniques used in Magna Graecia, the coastal areas of Southern Italy, between the 4th and 1st centuries BC.

== Sources ==
- Ettore M. De Juliis (1984). Gli ori di Taranto in età ellenistica. Milano: Arnoldo Mondadori Editore.
- Cosimo D'Angela (1989). Gli ori bizantini del Museo archeologico di Taranto. Taranto: Scorpione Editrice.
- Amelia D'Amicis, Laura Masiello "Ori del Museo nazionale archeologico di Taranto" Scorpione 2007
