= Zoosafari Fasanolandia =

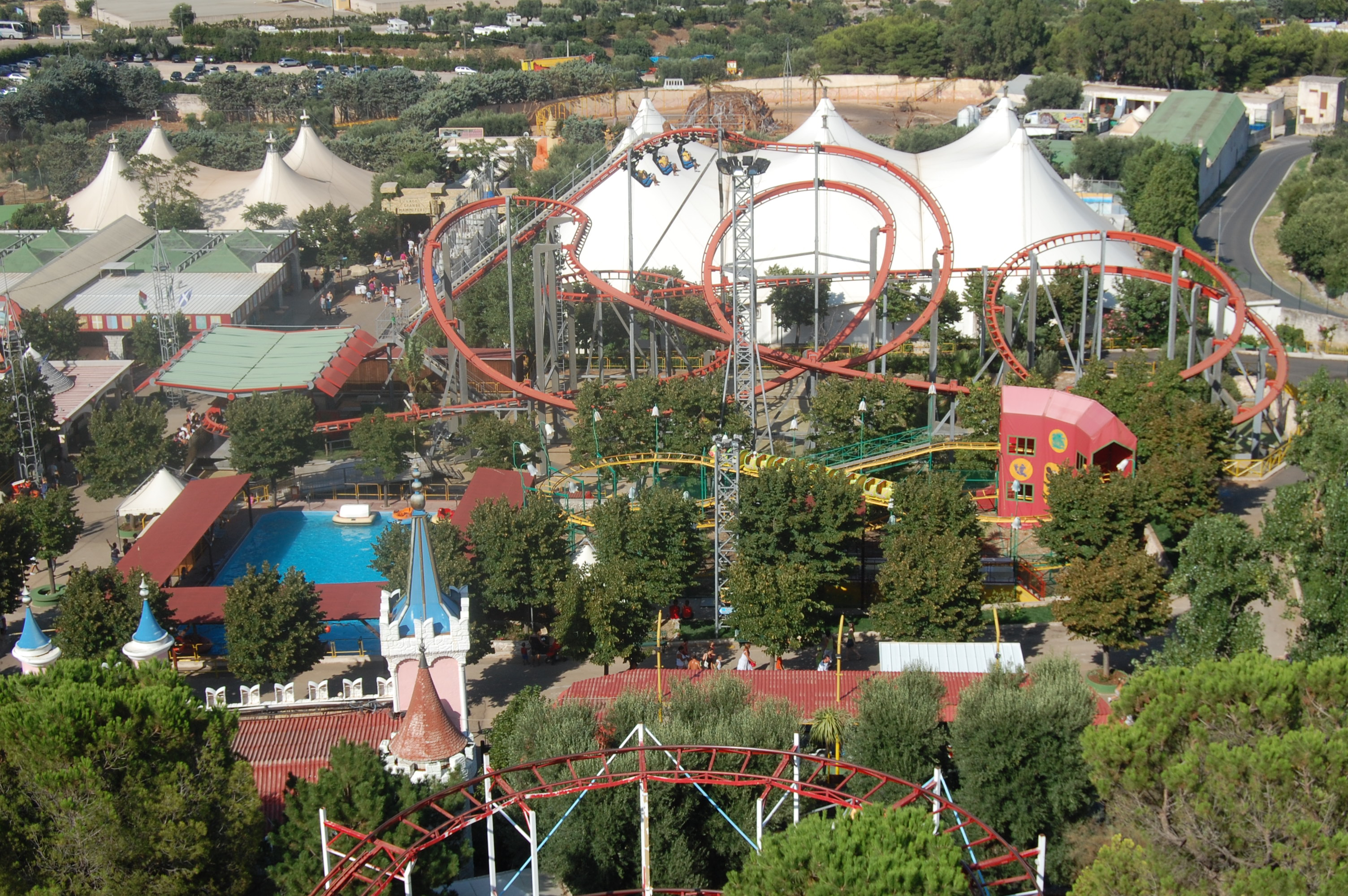
- View of the park
- Interactive map of Zoosafari Fasanolandia
- 40.8335°N 17.3386°E
- Date opened: 1973
- Location: Fasano, Italy
- Land area: 150 acres (61 ha)
- Website: www.zoosafari.it

Zoosafari Fasanolandia is an animal attraction and theme park in Fasano in Southern Italy. The park includes a drive-through safari park in the visitor's vehicle as well as walk around animal areas, animal shows, and several rides.

== History ==
The park opened in 1973 and includes the only male African elephant and polar bears in Italy. It's the second largest wildlife park in Europe. The park is located in the town of Fasano in the province of Brindisi, Apulia, in Southern Italy. It is on a Mediterranean hillside overlooking the sea. The park covers more than 150 acres (61 ha).

In December 2013, the zoo flooded, requiring the rescue of a number of the park's residents when their enclosures came under water.

In 2017, animal rights activists targeted Zoosafari about conditions of keeping polar bears at the park during a heatwave. Concerns about the ethics of housing polar bears at Zoosafari in the Italian summer heat have remained over the years. In 2024, five petitions reportedly raised more than 65,000 signatures.

In 2022, eight deer escaped from the park when an opening was made in their enclosure by suspected hunters.

In 2023, Zoosafari Fasanolandia offered to take in a brown bear from the Dolomites who had killed a tourist and was destined for euthanasia. The bear ultimately moved to Romania.

== Exhibits ==
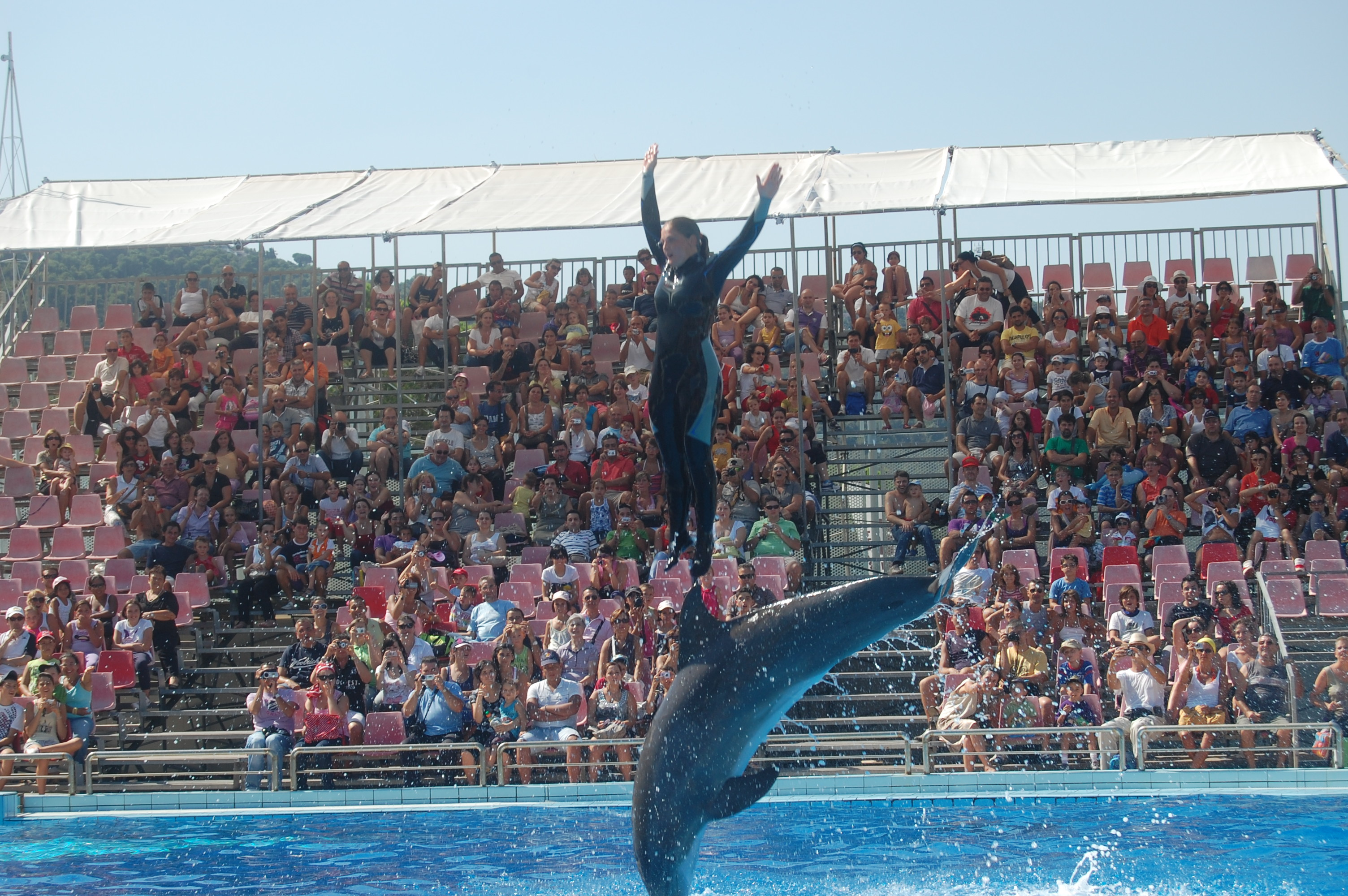
Dolphin show

- Safari Park – This is the main animal reserve at the park. Visitors drive through in their vehicles and observe wildlife from all over the globe roaming freely. When first entering the park, mouflon, fallow deer, red deer, barbary sheep, bongo, sitatunga, and water buffalo can be seen. After passing through the gates, a large pride of African lions can be viewed by visitors. Tigers and Asiatic black bears are also present. After leaving the large carnivores, macaques can be seen playing and climbing in trees. African and Asian elephants are seen later on, along with giraffes, American bison, elands, Arabian oryx, donkeys, waterbuck, wildebeest, zebras, llamas, ostriches, emus, horses and ponies, Ankole cattle, yaks and camels. The safari reserves end with the large lake of pink flamingos, cranes, storks, ibises and peacocks.
- Tropical Room – After exiting the reserves, a number of reserves can be viewed on foot, the first of which is the tropical room. Alligators and terrapins can be seen in a large tank, and many snakes, lizards, and tortoises can be seen as well. Several amphibians can also be seen along with many fish.
- Pedonal Zoological Trail – A special train can be ridden around this reserve, giving visitors the chance to see the animals more clearly. Gorillas, chimpanzees, gibbons, and lemurs are some of the primate species present, while leopards and black panthers also make themselves at home. Capybaras, raccoons, and African hunting dogs are also seen occasionally.
- Lake of the Large Mammals – A number of species can be observed here. Seals and sea lions swim in the lake, while on land, brown bears, polar bears, hippopotamuses, and a pair of white rhinos can be seen.
- Ornithological Exhibit – A number of tropical birds can be seen here including macaws, several birds of prey, and parrots.
- Penguin House – A large group of penguins can be seen swimming and playing in their pool.
- Dolphinarium – Several bottle-nosed dolphins can be seen here.

== Theme park ==
As well as animals, the park has several rides: a log flume, roller coasters, ghost trains, and dodgem cars. One of the roller coasters, named Eurofighter, has a 97 degree drop.

== See also ==
- Eurofighter (Zoosafari Fasanolandia)
