= Fasano =

- Comune
- Comune di Fasano
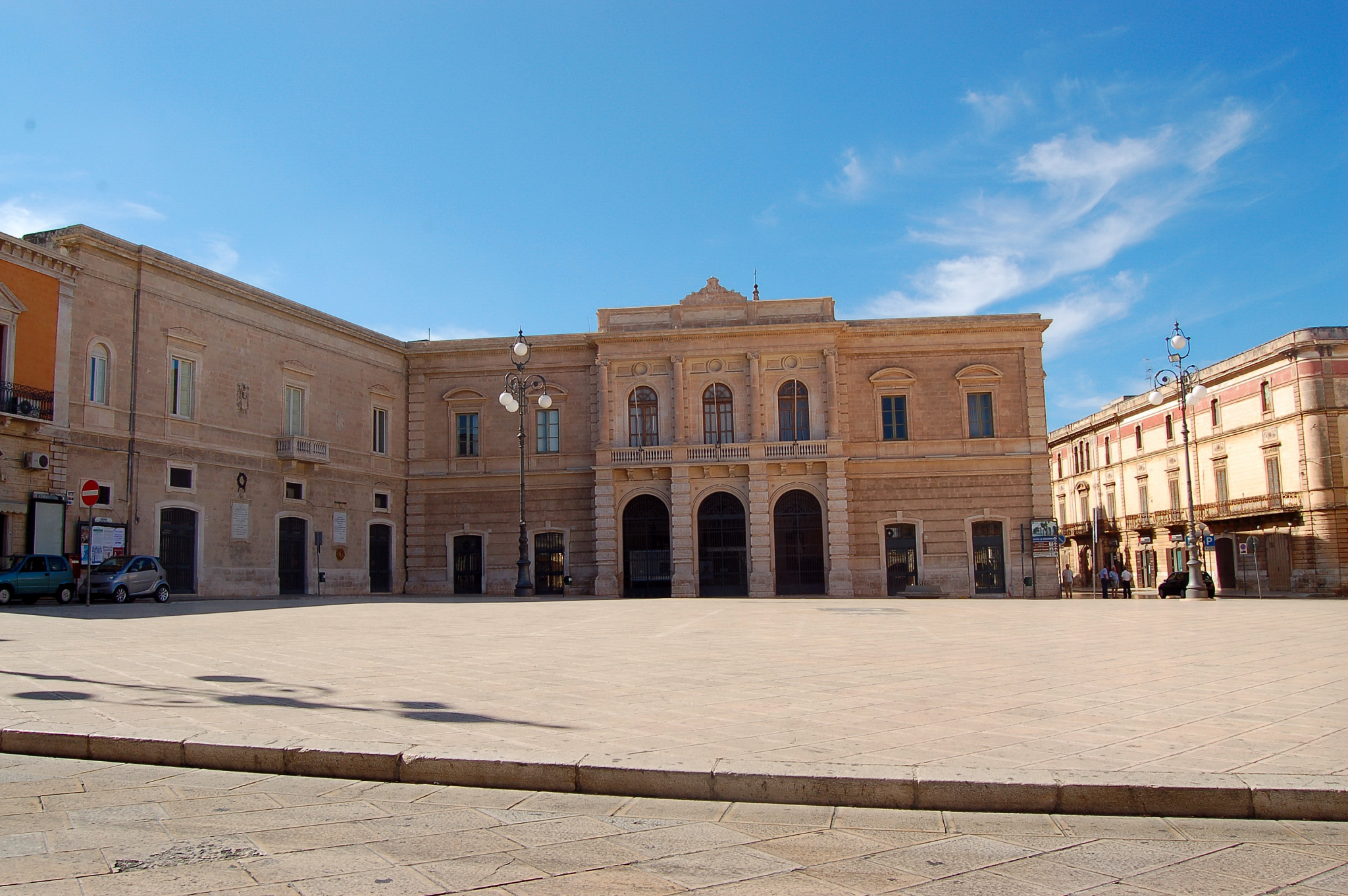
- Balì Palace in Fasano

- Fasano within the Province of Brindisi

- Location within Italy Location within Apulia
- Coordinates: 40°50′N 17°22′E
- Country: Italy
- Region: Apulia
- Province: Brindisi (BR)
- Frazioni: Canale di Pirro, Laureto, Montalbano, Pezze di Greco, Pozzo Faceto, Savelletri, Selva di Fasano, Speziale, Torre Canne, Torre Spaccata

Government
  - Mayor: Francesco Zaccaria (PD)

Area
  - Total: 128 km^{2} (49 sq mi)
- Elevation: 111 m (364 ft)

Population (31 March 2018)
  - Total: 39,711
  - Density: 310/km^{2} (804/sq mi)
- Demonym: Fasanesi
- Time zone: UTC+1 (CET)
  - Summer (DST): UTC+2 (CEST)
- Postal code: 72015, 72010
- Dialing code: 080
- Patron saint: Madonna del Pozzo and Saint John the Baptist
- Saint day: Third Sunday in June
- Website: Official website

Fasano (Italian pronunciation: [faˈzaːno]; Barese: Fasciànë) is a town and comune in the Province of Brindisi, in the region of Apulia, southern Italy. With a population of 39,026 as of 2021, it is the second most populous municipality in the province, after Brindisi.

== History ==
According to a local folk etymology, the name "Fasano" derives from the Faso, a large wild columbus dove that, according to tradition, used to drink from a natural pool or swamp known as the fogge. This body of water formed from runoff flowing down from the nearby hills. The image of the dove is also featured on the city's coat of arms. The area where the pool once existed is now a public garden.

Fasano lies along the route of the ancient Appian Way (Via Appia), the Roman road that connected Brindisi to Rome. The road traverses the town’s coastal frazione of Savelletri, and sections of the ancient route remain visible to this day.

== Geography ==
Fasano marks the border between the Salento and the Metropolitan City of Bari. It is about 50 kilometres (31 mi) from all three of the provincial capitals in Apulia, namely Bari, Taranto and Brindisi.

The municipality borders Alberobello (BA), Cisternino, Locorotondo (BA), Monopoli (BA) and Ostuni. It counts the hamlets (frazioni) of Canale di Pirro, Laureto, Montalbano, Pezze di Greco, Pozzo Faceto, Savelletri, Selva di Fasano, Speziale, Torre Canne and Torre Spaccata.

Fasano is situated in an area with olive trees and its territory extends from hills to the sea with rich Mediterranean vegetation.

Coming down from hills the town of Fasano occupies a dominant position in the valley which then leads down to the sea: coastal resorts include Savelletri with its beaches, the archaeological digs at Gnatia and a golf course and the fishing town of Torre Canne. Around Fasano are Pezze di Greco, Montalbano, Speziale and Pozzo Faceto, centres of secular olive cultivation; and a range of medieval fortified masserie, or farmhouses, aimed at agricultural tourism.

== Main sights ==
=== Religious ===
- Archaeological Park of Egnatia – The remains of an Ancient Italic city, later a Roman settlement, which also served as the seat of the now-suppressed bishopric of Egnazia Appula. The site includes ruins of ancient walls, roads, and early Christian buildings.
- Church of San Giovanni Battista (Chiesa Matrice) – Built in the 17th century, it serves as the main parish church of Fasano and is dedicated to John the Baptist.
- Tempietto di Seppannibale – A small early Christian rural church, dating back to the 9th–10th centuries, notable for its simple stone architecture and religious frescoes.
- Minaret of Fasano – An unusual Islamic-style minaret constructed in 1918 by a local intellectual and traveler as a private residence and cultural monument. Though not connected to a mosque, it stands as an architectural curiosity.

=== Other ===
- Dolmen of Montalbano – A megalithic burial monument believed to date from the Bronze Age, located in the frazione of Montalbano.
- Torrione delle Fogge – The last surviving of the original eleven defensive towers that once protected the city, offering a glimpse into its medieval fortifications.
- Selva di Fasano – A wooded hill area northeast of the town, today home to villas, gardens, and panoramic viewpoints over the Adriatic coast.
- Original trulli houses – Traditional dry-stone conical dwellings typical of the region, found scattered in the rural areas of Fasano.
- Fasanolandia – The first safari-style zoo park established in Europe, combining wildlife exhibits with amusement park attractions. It hosts a wide range of exotic animals and draws visitors from across Italy.

== Transport ==
Fasano station is an important stop, both for regional and long-distance trains, on the Adriatic railway. Cotrap buses provide public transport connections between the airport and the city centre.

The SS 16 highway "Adriatica" Padua-Otranto serves the town with two exits, "Fasano" and "Savelletri".

Fasano is served by the following nearby airports:

- Bari Airport
- Brindisi Airport

Fasano is also served by Cotrap and FS Sud Est buses.

== Sport ==
A.S. Fasano is the town's main football club. It plays its home matches at the Vito Curlo Stadium, which has a capacity of around 2,000 spectators.

Fasano is also known for its handball tradition. The local clubs include Junior Fasano, which has competed at the national level and won several Italian championships, and Roberto Serra Fasano, a club known for youth development and community involvement.

== Notable people ==
- Vittorio Ghirelli (born 1994) – Professional racing driver who has competed in series such as GP3, Auto GP, and Euroformula Open.
- Giambattista Giannoccaro (born 1960) – Former racing driver and team owner, active in GT and endurance racing.
- Renato Olive (born 1971) – Former professional footballer who played as a midfielder for clubs in Serie A and Serie B, including Lecce and Bologna FC.
- Said Ahmed (born 1972) – Kickboxer and three-time world champion in various international competitions.

== Gallery ==
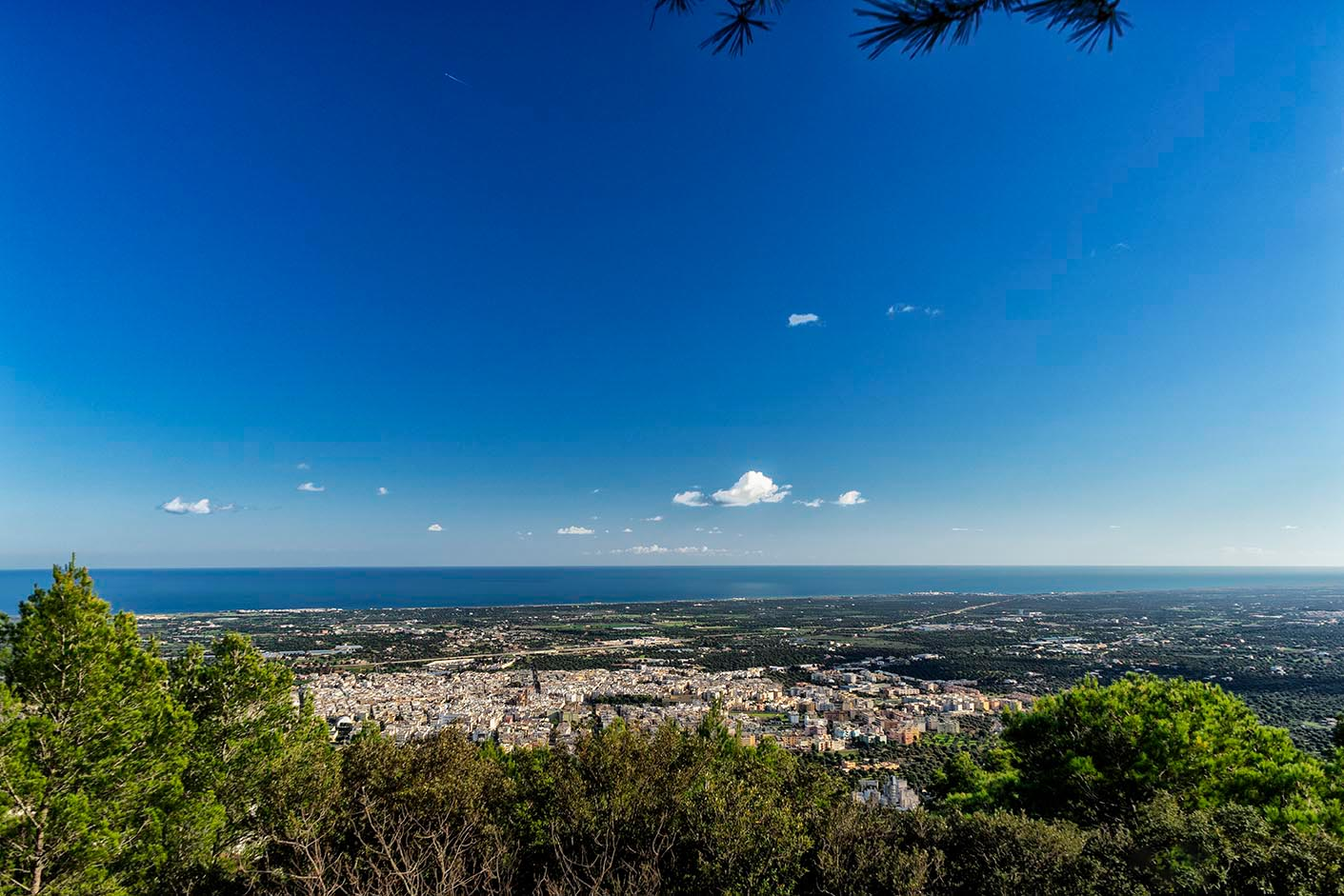

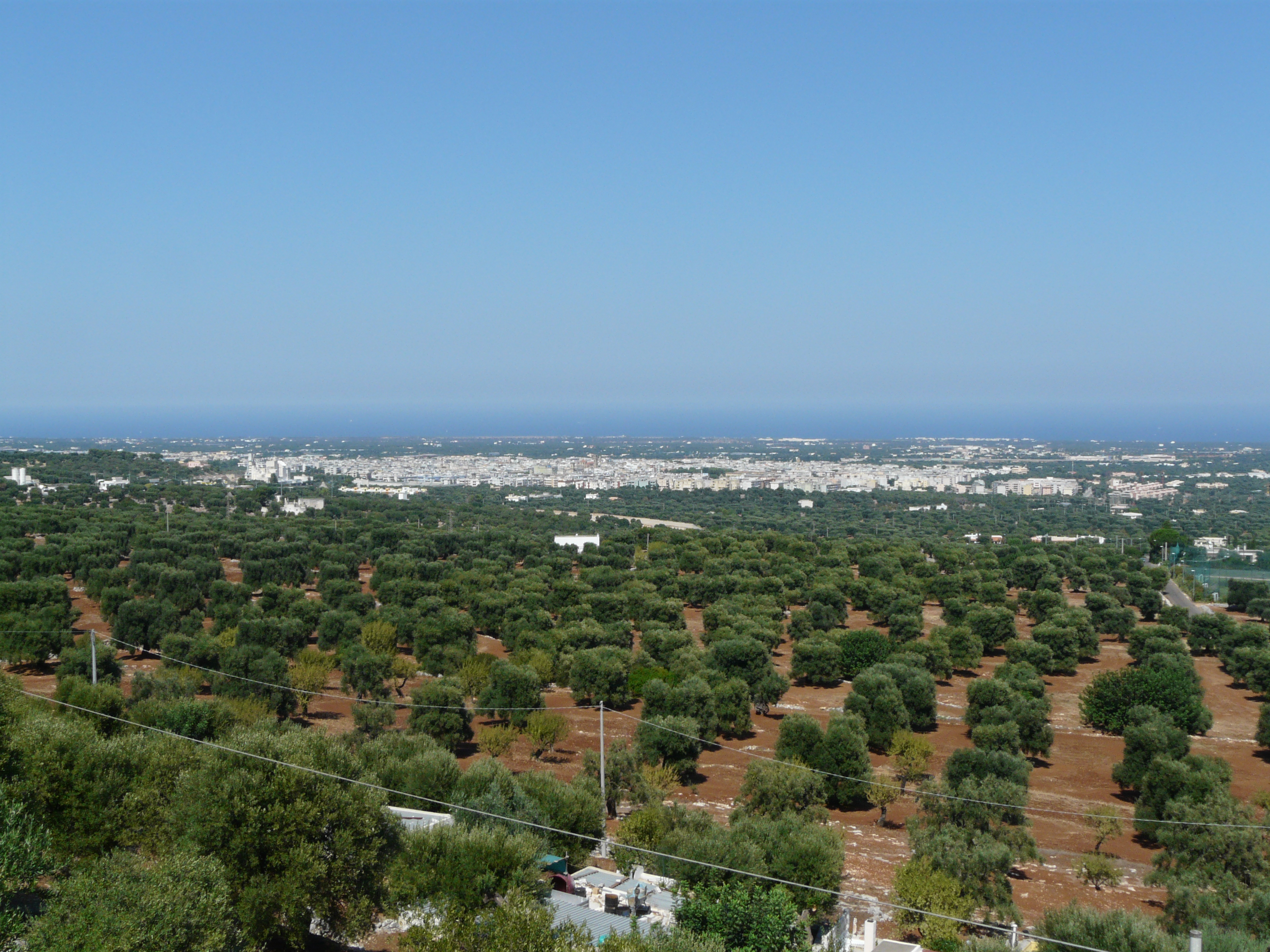

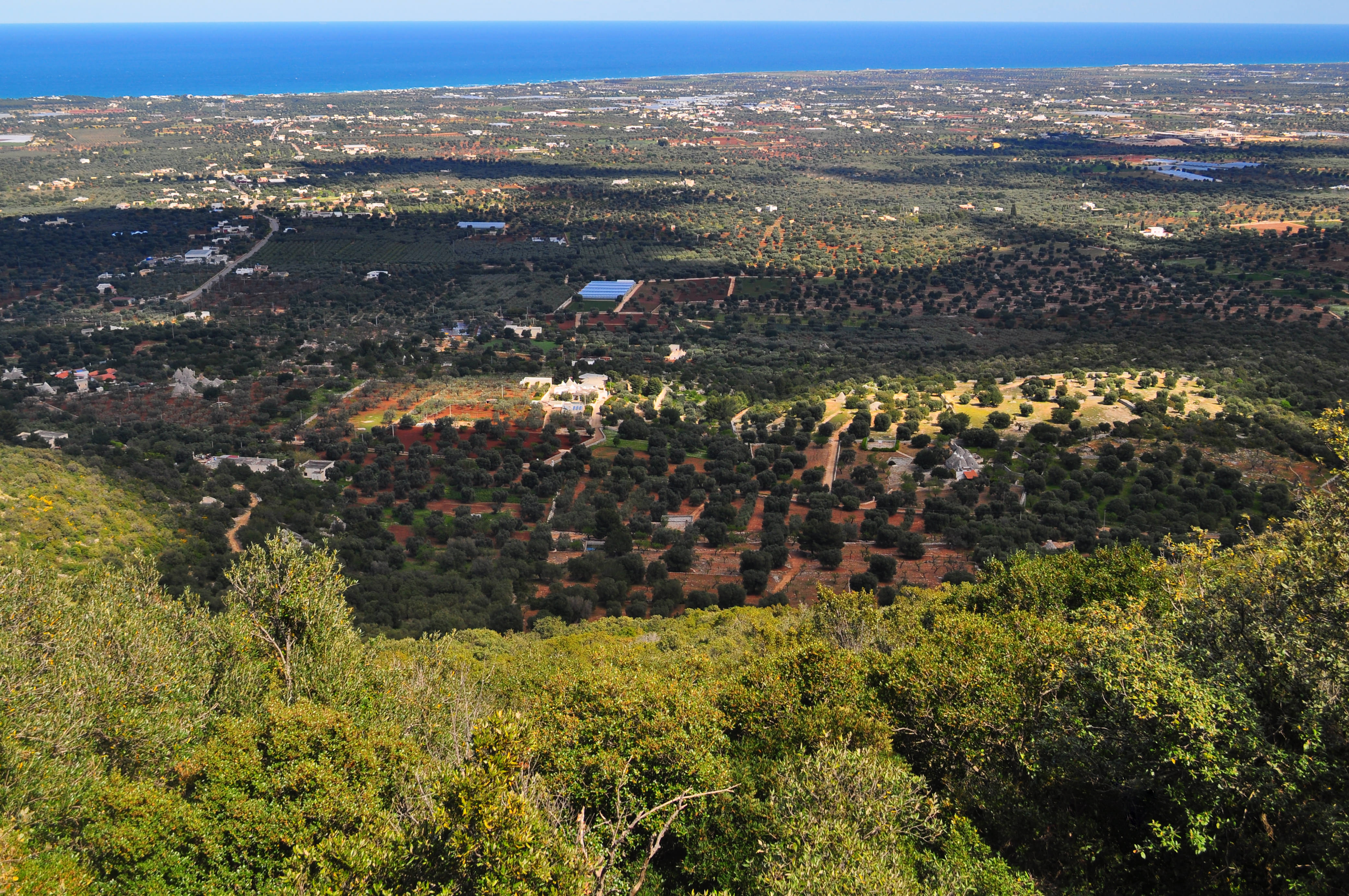

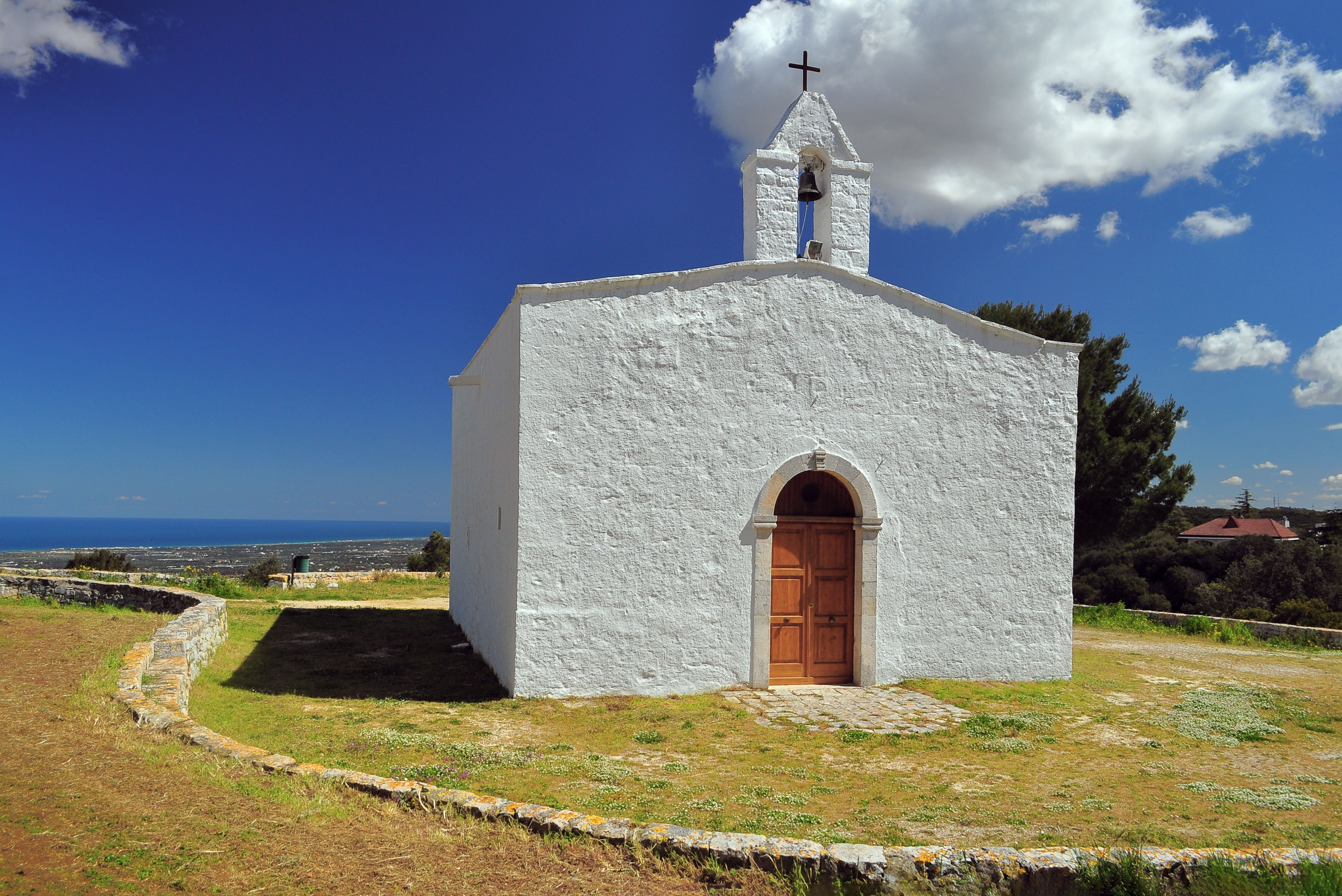

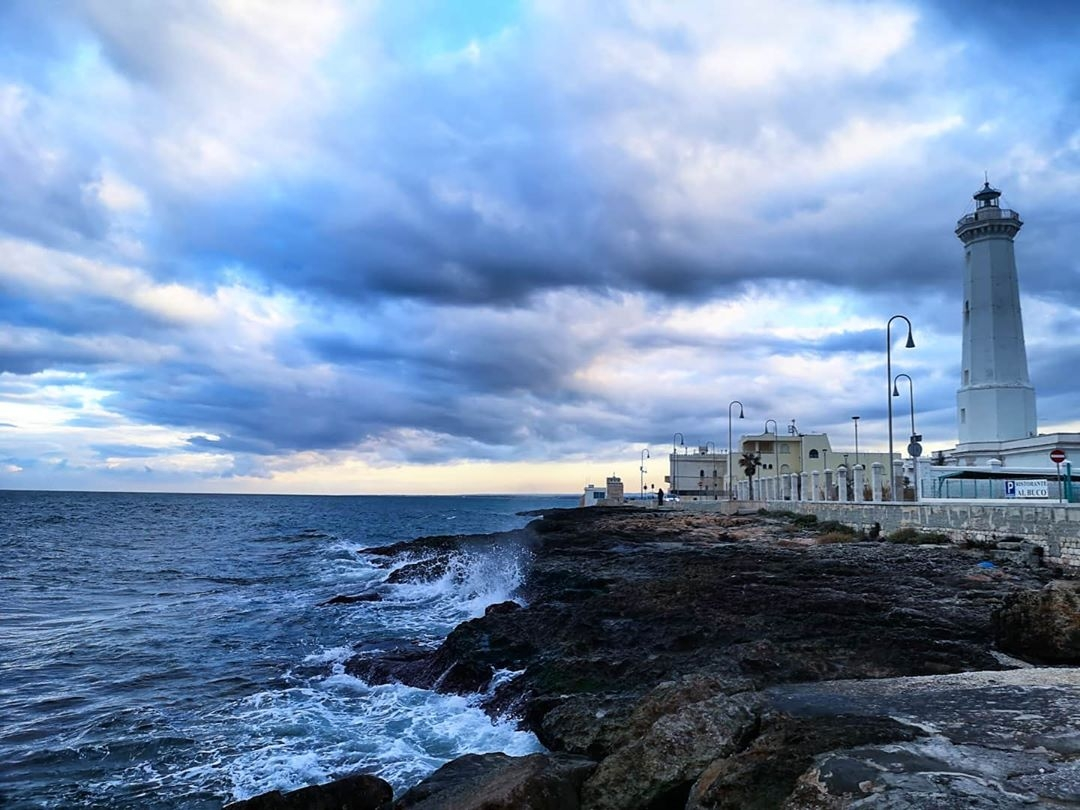

== See also ==
- Eurofighter
- Punta Torre Canne Lighthouse
