= Gnatia =

Coordinates: 40.887799°N 17.391103°E

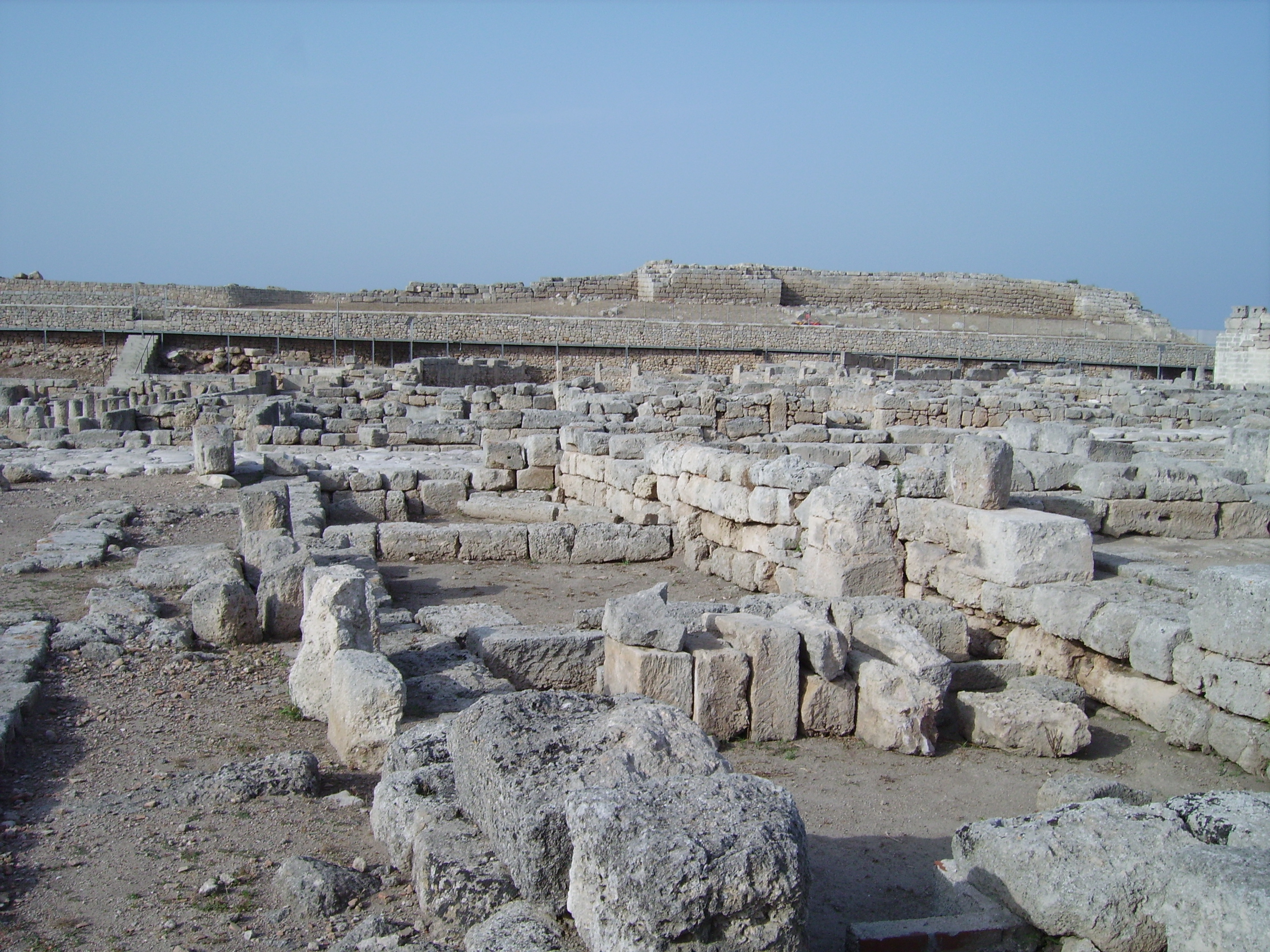
- View of Gnatia and acropolis behind

- Location within Italy
- Type: Settlement
- Location: Fasano, Province of Brindisi, Apulia, Italy

Site notes
- Website: www.egnazia.eu

UNESCO World Heritage Site
- Part of: Via Appia. Regina Viarum
- Criteria: Cultural: iii, iv, vi
- Reference: 1708-019
- Inscription: 2024 (46th Session)

Gnatia, Egnatia or Ignatia (Ancient Greek: Egnatia) was an ancient city of the Messapii, and their frontier town towards the Salentini. As Egnazia Appula, it was a medieval bishopric, which remains a Latin Catholic titular see.

It is located near the modern Fasano, in Salento, the southern part of Puglia (Apulia) region in southern Italy.

== History ==
The first settlement known in the place dates from the Bronze Age (15th century BC). In the 11th century BC it was invaded by the Iapyges, while the Messapic (another Iapyyg tribe) era of the town (as well as for the whole Salento) began in the 8th century BC, to end in the 3rd century BC, with the Roman conquest.

Under the Romans, it was of importance for its trade, lying as it did on the sea, at the point where the Via Traiana joined the coast road, 50 kilometers (31 mi) southeast of Barium (Bari). It was famed for its solar and fire cult, which was described by Pliny (Note: —in Sallentino oppido Gnatia inposito ligno in saxum quoddam ibi sacrum protinus flammam existere— (Note: "In Egnatia, a town of Salentinum, there is a sacred stone, upon which, when wood is placed, flame immediately bursts forth.")) and ridiculed by Horace. (Note: —Dehinc Gnatia lymphis Iratis extructa dedit risusque jocosque, Dum flammâ sine thura liquescere limine Sacro Persuadere cupit: credat Judaeus apella Non ego— (Note: "And then Fasano, built beneath the ban of fountain nymphs, (Note: "I.e., it had no pure water".) gave food for laughter and for jest, by its mad wish to make us think that frankincense without the aid of flame will melt upon the threshold of some fane. Let any superstitious Jew think so, but I could not, for I know now from Epicurus that the gods pass their time free from care, and that it is no threatening rage of theirs that sends down from the heavens' lofty dome whatever natural phenomenon we see."))

The city, an early bishopric (see below), was abandoned in the Middle Ages due to the spread of malaria in the area, or to Vandal and Saracen attacks, or even given the last blow by Holy Roman Emperor Louis II of Italy (who also conquered Bari on Byzantium in 871).

It is last explicitly mentioned by a Ravenna author about 700, and Benedictine historian Paul the Deacon mentions successor see Monopoli as eagerly contested between Byzantines and Longobards as late as 763.

=== Ruins ===
The ancient city walls were almost entirely destroyed over a century ago to provide building material. The walls have been described as being 8 yards (7.3 m) thick and 16 courses high. The place is famous for the discoveries made in its tombs. A considerable collection of antiquities from Gnatia is preserved at Fasano, though the best are in the museum at Bari.

== Ecclesiastical history ==
Tradition claims it was evangelized by the Prince of Apostles Saint Peter himself.

An episcopal see named Egnazia Appula was established probably before 400, a suffragan of the Archdiocese of Bari, but suppressed in 545, its territory being reassigned to establish the Diocese of Monopoli, possibly before the city itself was abandoned.

A bishop of (E)Gnatia, Rufentius, participated in the three-part Council of Rome, convened in the 501, 502 and 504 by Pope Symmachus I, and in the council called by Italy's Ostrogoth king Theoderic the Great to judge that Pope but which fully reinstated him.

Apparently the see was restored or the title retained, as three later bishops of Egnazia Appula were recorded, but other documents suggest these may be spurious; even if not, the see was (possibly again) suppressed later :

- Basilius, allegedly attending the Lateran Council of 649, which condemned as heresy Monothelitism
- Eucherius, allegedly elected in 701 and consecrated in 702 by the Metropolitan of the Archdiocese of Benevento-Siponto
- Selperius, allegedly consecrated in 720 the church of San Giovanni de portu aspero in Monopoli, where tradition says (without documented proof) its episcopal see was transferred as Diocese of Monopoli, which may however have been founded as late as the ninth century.

The city and bishopric were in decay since the sixth century Longobards (Lombard) invasion, but the time of its demise remains unclear.

=== Titular see ===
The diocese was nominally restored only in June 2004, as a Latin titular bishopric, under the name Egnazia Appula (Italian), corresponding to Latin Egnatia (in Apulia) / Egnatin(us) in Apulia (Latin adjective).

So far it has had one incumbent, not of the fitting Episcopal (lowest) rank but of Archiepiscopal rank:

- Titular Archbishop Nicola Girasoli (Italian) (2006.01.24 – ...)

== See also ==
- Gnathia vases
- List of Catholic dioceses in Italy
- The New Archaeological Museum of Ugento

== Sources ==
=== Bibliography ===
- Horace (Q. Horatius Flaccus) (1869), A Rhythmical Translation of the First Book of the Satires of Horace, translated from the Latin by R.M. Millington for Longmans, Green, Reader, & Dyer.
- Pliny the Elder (G. Plinius Secundus) (1855), The Natural History of Pliny, London: translated from the Latin by John Bostock & Henry Thomas Riley for H.G. Bohn.

Ecclesiastical history

- Ferdinando Ughelli - Nicolò Coleti, Italia sacra, vol. X, 1722, coll. 74-75
- Francesco Lanzoni, Le diocesi d'Italia dalle origini al principio del secolo VII (an. 604), vol. I, Faenza 1927, p. 302
