= Tonnerre 2 Zeus =

Wooden roller coaster at Parc Astérix in France

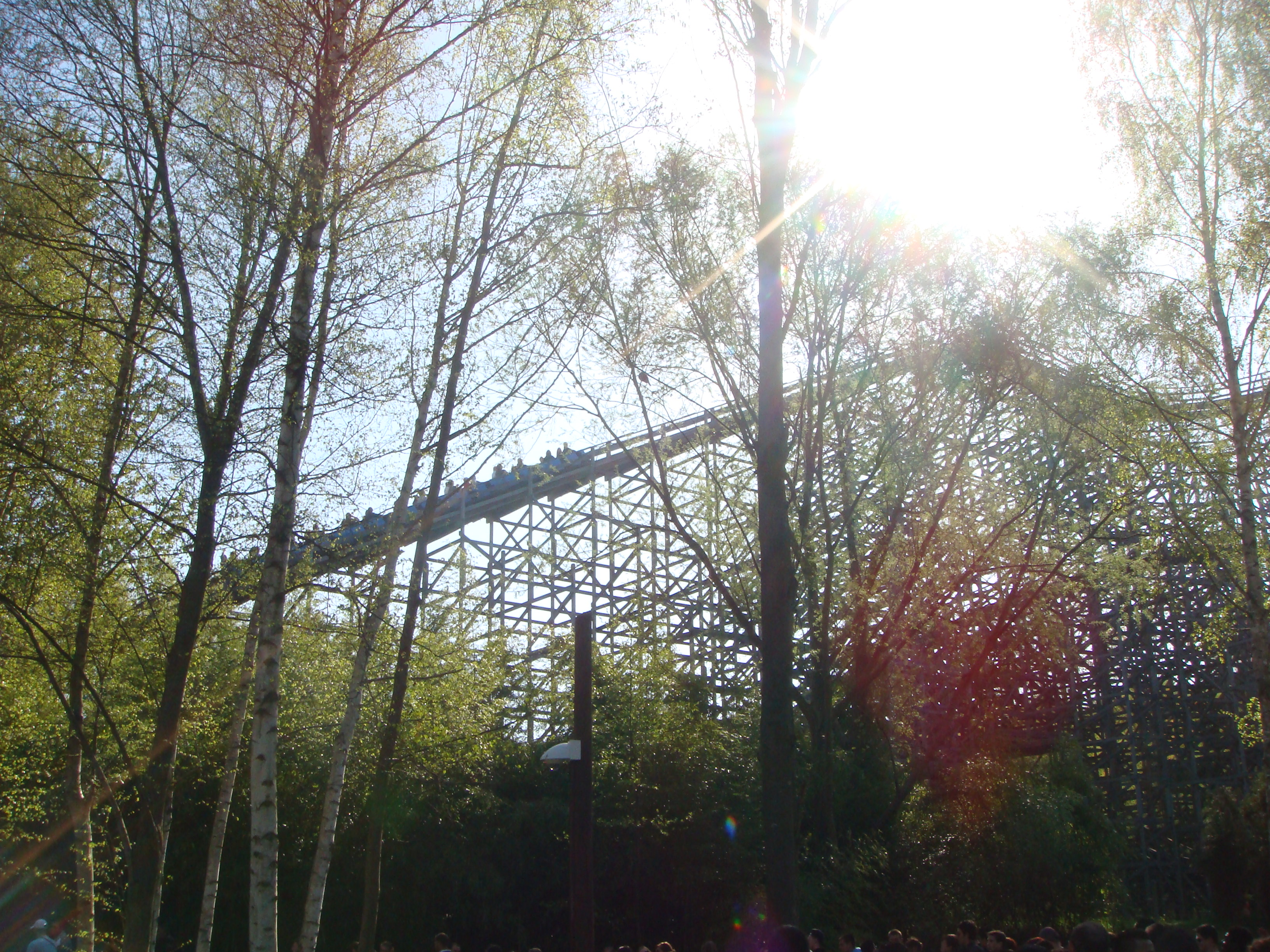

Parc Astérix
- Location: Parc Astérix
- Park section: Antique Greece
- Coordinates: 49°07′53″N 2°34′26″E
- Status: Operating
- Opening date: April 5, 1997
- Cost: €7,000,000 (1997)

General statistics
- Type: Wood
- Manufacturer: Custom Coasters International
- Designer: Dennis McNulty, Larry Bill
- Lift/launch system: Chain lift hill
- Height: 98 ft (30 m)
- Length: 4,044 ft (1,233 m)
- Speed: 52 mph (84 km/h)
- Duration: 2:05
- Height restriction: 130 cm (4 ft 3 in)
- Trains: 2 trains with 14 cars. Riders are arranged 2 across in a single row for a total of 28 riders per train.
- Website: Official site
- Tonnerre 2 Zeus at RCDB

Tonnerre Deux Zeus (formerly known as Tonnerre de Zeus, commonly stylized as Tonnerre 2 Zeus) is a wooden roller coaster located at Parc Astérix in Plailly, France. Opened in 1997 and built by Custom Coasters International, it is currently the 3rd longest wooden coaster in Europe, after Colossos and Coaster Express (Parque Warner Madrid). Between 2019 and 2022, the coaster underwent a three-year renovation from The Gravity Group, eventually re-emerging as the Tonnerre 2 Zeus in 2022.

"Tonnerre de Zeus" is French for "Thunder of Zeus." In Greek mythology, Zeus was regarded as the king of gods. He also is often associated as being a weather god, hurling a thunderbolt at those who displeased him.

A large statue of Zeus is featured at the entrance to the ride's queue line, which extends through a neighboring wooded area, then follows the ride's final helix and the brake run before heading towards the station itself: a massive Greek temple allowing for a quick passenger load and unload.

== History ==
The original Tonnerre de Zeus opened in April 1997 as the second wooden roller coaster built in France after Walygator Parc's Anaconda, and the park's second large-scale coaster after Goudurix in 1989. No other wooden coasters were built in France until Walibi Rhône-Alpes – also owned by Parc Astérix operator Compagnie des Alpes – debuted Timber in 2016. Built by the Gravity Group, Timber was constructed at a cost of €4.2 million and was well received by the public.

In 2019, the park began a three-phase renovation project on the coaster in which 85% of the track and structure would be replaced. In conduction with the Gravity Group, Phase's 1 and 2 took place during the 2018–19 and 2019-20 park offseason's, respectively. The third and final phase was originally planned to take place in the autumn of 2020, but was put on hold for a year due to the COVID-19 pandemic.

Tonnerre 2 Zeus was officially announced by Parc Astérix on June 24, 2021, which would revitalize the coaster's image and conclude the renovations. The lead car of the new Timberliner trains was unveiled at the IAAPA Expo Europe in Barcelona on September 28, 2021. Tonnerre de Zeus officially held its last day of operation prior to the final stage of its transformation on November 7. The new Timberliners were delivered in late March 2022, and Tonnerre 2 Zeus held its grand re-opening on April 9.

Parc Astérix announced yet another two-year renovation effort for Tonnerre 2 Zeus on November 29, 2025, this time in partnership with Rocky Mountain Construction. Approximately 60% of the layout will be replaced with the company's steel 208 ReTrak during the 2026 and 2027 winter seasons.

== Ride Experience ==
Riders exit the station and make a right-hand turn, proceeding into the 98-foot (30 m) tall chain lift hill. Upon reaching the top, yet another right hand turn sends the train down its initial drop and into a below ground tunnel, reaching a top speed of 55.9 mph (90.0 km/h). Following a turnaround, the coaster proceeds into a signature 90-degree banked airtime hill. A speed bump underneath the lift hill sends the train through a banked turnaround (previously a 540 degree clockwise helix prior to 2022) and then through a series of straight hills spanning the coaster site, before being greeted by yet another lower-ground turnaround. Crossing the layout yet again, riders navigate a left-hand turnaround into a darkened tunnel with smoke and strobe effects. A few more banked airtime moments lead to a final 270° counterclockwise helix, thus sending the train into the brake run. One ride on Tonnerre de Zeus lasts about 2 minutes and 5 seconds.

== Characteristics ==
=== Statistics ===
Prior to the retrack, Tonnerre 2 Zeus was 98 feet (30 m) tall, 4,044 feet (1,233 m) long, and reached a top speed of 52 mph (84 km/h) throughout the ride. Following the refurbishment, the peak speed was increased to 55.9 mph (90.0 km/h) and a total of 14 airtime moments were accounted for, although the track has been shortened due to the elimination of the double helix. Much of the original structure was built out of American Yellow Pine.

=== Trains ===
When Tonnerre de Zeus originally opened, it ran with two blue trains from Philadelphia Toboggan Coasters, each of which consisted of seven cars that sat riders in two rows of two for a total of 28 passengers per train. Another pair of trains – red and blue – were purchased for the 2004 season, although the latter was repainted blue in 2014. Following the 2021-22 offseason renovation, Tonnerre 2 Zeus currently runs with a pair of Timberliner trains from Gravitykraft, each consisting of 14 single row cars that seat a pair of riders across for a total of 28 riders per train. A third train is kept to the side as a spare. During the 2022 and 2023 seasons each train consisted of a single backwards row, which could initially be accessed at an €12 extra cost. The up-charge was later reduced to €8 before being scrapped altogether. The rows were replaced with two forwards-facing cars for the 2024 season.
