= Pégase Express =

Steel roller coaster at Parc Astérix

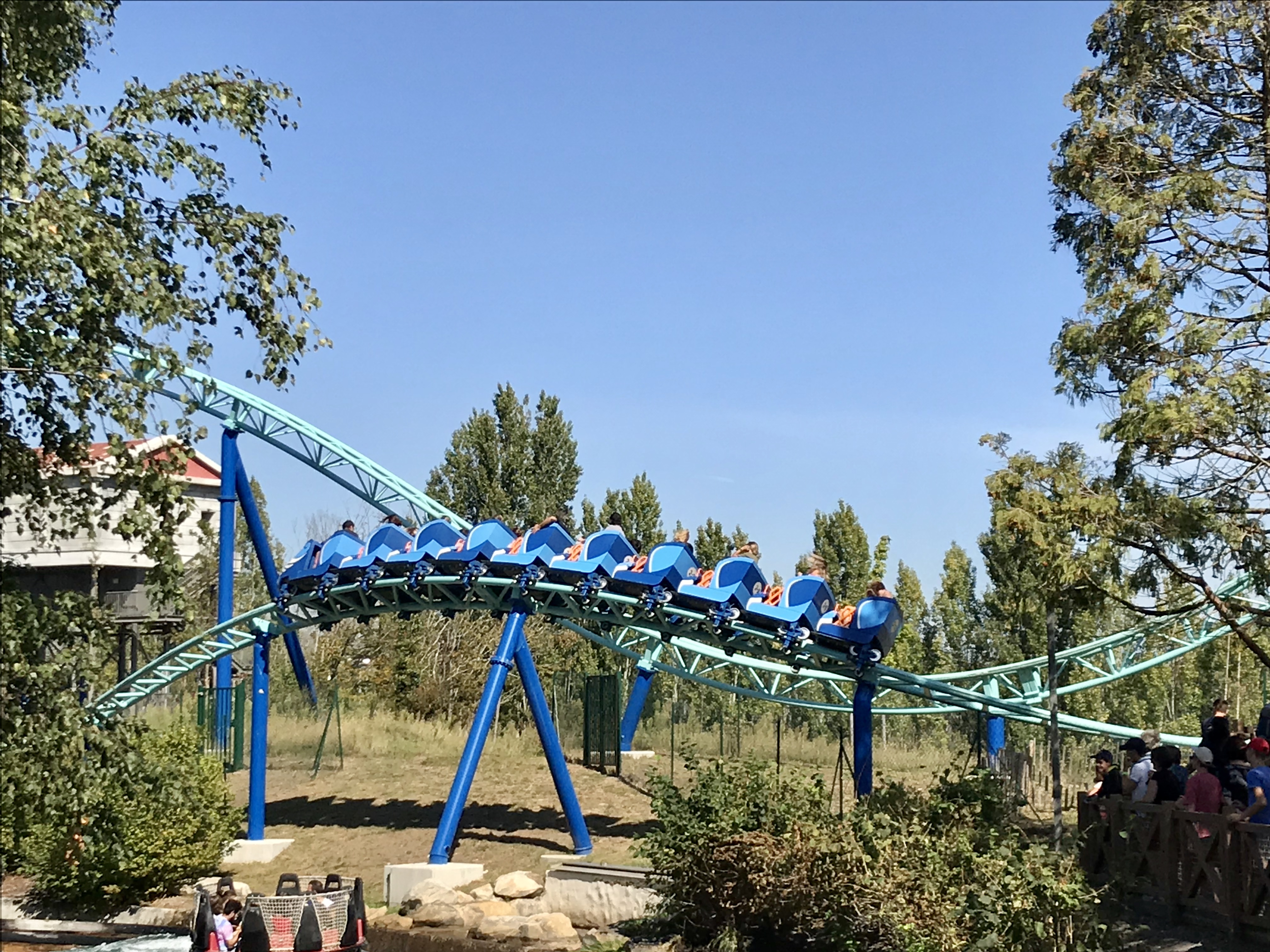

Parc Astérix
- Location: Parc Astérix
- Park section: La Grèce Antique
- Coordinates: 49.133595°N 2.573729°E
- Status: Operating
- Opening date: June 11, 2017; 8 years ago
- Cost: €16,000,000

General statistics
- Type: Steel – Family – Launched
- Manufacturer: Gerstlauer
- Designer: Jora Vision
- Model: Family Coaster
- Track layout: Out and Back
- Height: 68.8 ft (21.0 m)
- Length: 3,044.6 ft (928.0 m)
- Speed: 32.3 mph (52.0 km/h)
- Inversions: 0
- Duration: 3:00
- Capacity: 1200 riders per hour
- Height restriction: 100 cm (3 ft 3 in)
- Trains: 4 trains with 10 cars. Riders are arranged 2 across in a single row for a total of 20 riders per train.
- Official Website: Official website
- Pégase Express at RCDB

Pégase Express is a steel, family launched roller coaster at Parc Astérix in Plailly, France. The coaster opened to the public on June 11, 2017. It travels both forwards and backwards throughout the layout.

== History ==
During a televised interview in December 2014, park director Pascal Fliche revealed the park's intent to open a large-scale roller coaster in the 2017 season. In December 2015, a public survey was launched by park operator Compagnie des Alpes on the website Loisirs Lab. They asked for a preference of one of three options being considered as a future project. The three projects listed were: Crocos, an Egyptian-themed Zamperla top spin; Le Vol de Thor, a Norse-themed Bolliger & Mabillard Flying roller coaster and Pégase Express, a large Ancient Greece-themed Gerstlauer family coaster with similarities to the smash hit FireChaser Express at Dollywood. Ultimately, the latter project was the most favored and plans moved ahead as such.

Site preparation began in March 2016 in the Grèce Antique (Ancient Greece) section of the park, all but confirming that the Pégase Express concept was moving forwards. The track intended for the project was spotted at the Gerstlauer manufacturing plant in April. The coaster was officially confirmed by the park on July 4, 2016, and further details were released. Construction carried on through the fall and winter of 2016 - 2017 and the layout was completed around February–March 2017. Testing commenced in April 2017, while landscaping and station work wrapped up. More than 20 companies and firms worked to design, develop and construct the attraction.

A media preview event was held for the Pégase Express on June 10, 2017, and the attraction officially opened to the public the following day, on June 11, 2017.

== Characteristics ==
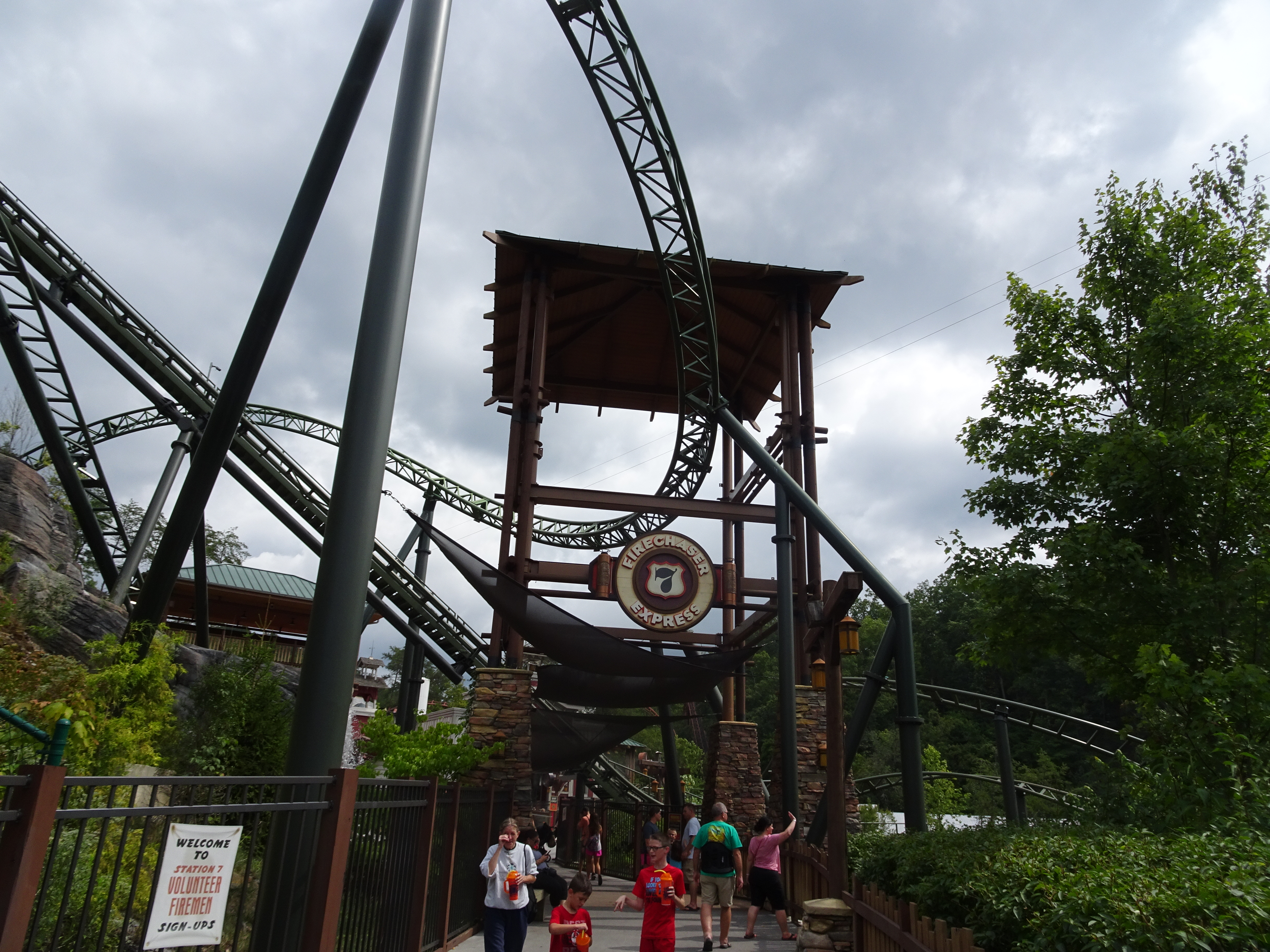
FireChaser Express was cited by the park as a major reference point for the coaster

=== Statistics ===
Pégase Express is 3,044.6 feet (928.0 m) in length, stands 68.8 feet (21.0 m) tall, has more than 200 track supports and reaches a top speed of 32.3 mph (52.0 km/h) during the ride. Around one third (1/3) of the listed length is traveled backwards. The coaster has two lift hills, each of which stand 68.8-foot (21.0 m) and 42.5 feet (13.0 m), respectively. The ride also has a pair of drive tire launches. The first launches the train forwards and the other backwards, although these do not gain significant speed and are not seen as the primary ride lift mechanisms.

Pégase Express runs 4 trains, each consisting of 10 cars that seat a pair of riders in a single row, accounting for an estimated total capacity of 1,200 riders per hour. The coaster's station building is approximately 17 metres (56 ft) tall and 24-metre (79 ft) long.

=== Model ===
Pégase Express was manufactured by German firm Gerstlauer and is one of their Family Coaster models. The ride's main source of reference was the FireChaser Express coaster at Dollywood in Pigeon Forge, Tennessee. Another Gerstlauer coaster that opened in 2014 with considerable theming features and several similarities to the Pégase Express.

=== Theme ===
The theme, like the rest of the park, draws heavily from the Asterix universe and references to such can be found throughout the queue. The attraction is themed as a transportation service, where the trains are pulled at high speeds thanks by the winged horse Pegasus. The queue and station are located in the fictional Gare Montparnassos train station. The station's name is a reference to both the actual Parisian train station as well as the Mount Parnassus mountain in Greece. The queue is filled with various posters and station elements mimicking those of modern-day travel. Headlines and ticket booths refer to real life situations such as common commuter struggles, a railway worker's strike and an upcoming tunnel to Londinium. A 5-metre (16 ft) statue of Pegasus also adorns the entrance to the ride.

Pégase Express's theme and architecture was designed by Dutch design firm Jora Vision in close collaboration with the park. The ride's Projection mapping scene in Medusa's temple mid-ride was created by Belgian creative studio b71.

== Ride experience ==
Once passengers have boarded, the coaster train is propelled out of the station by a drive tire launch and into a downwards 270° right-hand helix. A sharp left hand turn leads to the transfer track area and the coaster's main 68.8-foot (21.0 m) tall chain lift hill. At the top, riders make a slight left turn before descending the coaster's main drop, proceeding to crest a flat camelback hill that crosses over the Romus et Rapidus rapids ride and a pair of twisted airtime hills with a tunnel in between. Another airtime hill leads into a shallow double up and into a turnaround, passing through a faux billboard in the process. The coaster maneuvers over and under itself in a series of twists and then ascends its second lift.

The train is propelled up to a height of 42.5 feet (13.0 m) via a drive tire lift. A switch track hastily diverts the train into an indoor show scene, depicting the temple of Medusa. A projection mapping sequence appears where Medusa is evidently displeased at trespassers in her temple and prepares to turn the riders to stone. The train is suddenly launched backwards and blow past the lift hill. It then descends a curved drop and speed along a series of low-ground twists over the Romus et Rapidus before hitting the final brake run. The coaster train backs up and a switch track enables riders to travel forwards once again where a final 180° left hand turn leads to the final holding brake before the station. The ride experience lasts approximately 3 minutes.
