= Tiki-Waka (roller coaster) =

Steel roller coaster at Walibi Belgium

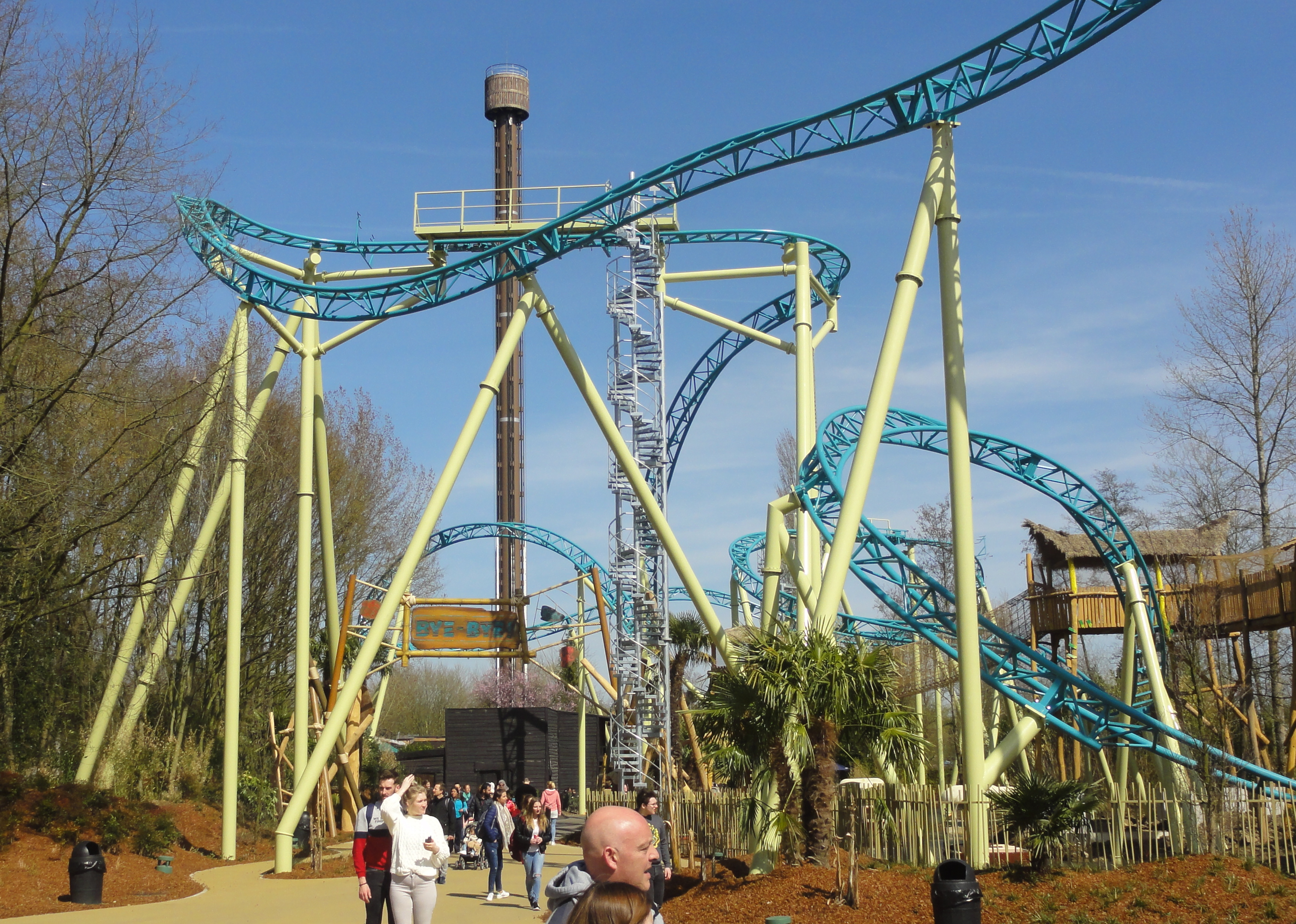

Walibi Belgium
- Location: Walibi Belgium
- Park section: Exotic World
- Coordinates: 50.697062°N 4.587116°E
- Status: Operating
- Opening date: April 7, 2018; 8 years ago
- Cost: €7,800,000
- Replaced: Coccinelle

General statistics
- Type: Steel
- Manufacturer: Gerstlauer
- Model: Bobsled Coaster
- Lift/launch system: Chain lift hill
- Height: 68.9 ft (21.0 m)
- Length: 1,850.4 ft (564.0 m)
- Speed: 34.2 mph (55.0 km/h)
- Inversions: 0
- Duration: 1:50
- Capacity: 600 riders per hour
- Height restriction: 100 cm (3 ft 3 in)
- Trains: 5 trains with a single car; riders arranged 2 across in 2 rows for a total of 4 riders per train
- Website: Official website
- Tiki-Waka at RCDB

Tiki-Waka is a steel family roller coaster located at Walibi Belgium in Wavre, Belgium. The Polynesian-themed coaster opened for the 2018 season as the headlining attraction in the newly re-themed Exotic World area, and was the beginning of a multi-year, €100 million expansion plan.

== History ==
In June 2017, Walibi announced a major multi-year plan to redesign and transform the park, with an accumulated total of €100,000,000 to be invested on new rides and parkwide theming. This began with the addition of a new family coaster, to be built near the Challenge of Tutankhamon Dark ride at the south end of the park and include an exotic theme. Construction of the new coaster and revitalization of the surrounding area would require the removal of the existing Coccinelle children's coaster, which would be refurbished and rebuilt on the site of the former Ferris wheel, beside the Loup-Garou wooden coaster, for the 2022 season and receive a New Orleans theme.

Coccinelle had its final day of operations on September 11, 2017, before being dismantled, with the station being razed and site preparation beginning shortly after. During the park's annual Walibi Belgium Fan Day event, on October 21, 2017, an animation of the ride's draft layout was screened for attendees, confirming the coaster to be a Gerstlauer custom Bobsled Coaster. Construction continued throughout the winter, and on February 15, 2018, park officials announced the ride's name to be Tiki-Waka at a press conference by the ride's construction site, where concept artwork for the ride trains were also revealed. The 2018 investments, which included an expansion of the Aqualibi Waterpark, cost the park roughly €12,000,000 of their planned €100 million master plan, with the Exotic World tallying around 7.8 million euros of that figure.

Construction on Tiki-Waka was completed on March 1, 2018. Despite the park's desire have the ride ready to begin public operations by a target date of March 31, 2018, a Facebook announcement from the park confirmed on March 21 that such would not be the case. The coaster began public operations on April 7, 2018, in the form of a soft opening.

== Characteristics ==
=== Statistics ===
Tiki-Waka is 68.9 feet (21.0 m) tall, 1,850.4 feet (564.0 m) long, and reaches a top speed of 34.2 mph (55.0 km/h) throughout the ride. The coaster runs up to 5 cars of 4 riders each, who are arranged in two rows of two, resulting in a maximum capacity of 600 riders per hour. The ride layout interacts heavily with the surrounding pathways and Tiki Trail attraction, as well as with the former Gold River Adventure boat ride.

=== Model ===
Tiki-Waka was designed and manufactured by Bavaria-based manufacturer Gerstlauer, who had worked on the refurbishment of the park's Psyké Underground coaster for the 2013 season and designed the Pégase Express coaster at Parc Astérix, another park owned by Walibi operator Compagnie des Alpes. The coaster is a part of Gerstlauer's family of Bobsled Coasters, which are widely seen as highly customizable wild mouse roller coasters.

=== Draft Layout ===
Animated footage of the ride first screened by Walibi and ride manufacturer Gerstlauer consisted of a similar coaster layout that has been said to be a draft of the attraction during its design stage, prior to the confirmation of its final layout. This draft layout featured the same set of elements, albeit arranged in a different order, with multiple helixes being present.

=== Theme ===
The ride is part of the new-for-2018 Exotic World park area, which features a distinct Polynesian theme. Tiki-Waka spoofs a tropical race car theme, and the surrounding area is decorated with lush vegetation and carved wooden textures. The station was built with Robinia wood from the Robinieae family of trees. Walibi Belgium hired Dutch design firm Jora Vision to design the area's theme. The company had previously worked on projects such as Psyké Underground's new theme overhaul in 2013 and the park's Pulsar water coaster in 2016.

=== Soundtrack ===
The official Tiki-Waka soundtrack was produced by German music composition company IMAscore, who had first worked on a soundtrack for Pulsar in 2016, and would write hour-long compositions for the park's rebranded Karma World and Fun World areas in 2019.

== Ride experience ==
The coaster exits the station into a left-hand turn before ascending the 68.9-foot (21.0 m) tall lift hill. Upon cresting the top, the car traverses an initial short drop and a trick-track over the pathway, and makes an uphill right hand turn into the first block brake section. A hairpin turn leads into another drop over the pathways, followed by a twisted airtime hill and a gradual right-hand turnaround composing of a brief outwards banked twist before hitting the second block brake. A twisting descent takes riders close to the ground and under the Tiki Trail treehouse attraction. The train then rises into another twisted airtime hill and dives under the Tiki Trail once more before popping up into the third block brake. Riders make a right-hand turn before entering three camelback hills and a 270 degree helix over the nearby pond. Trains then enter the final brake run, and a left-hand turn leads them back into the station where riders disembark the ride vehicles. The ride lasts approximately 1 minute and 50 seconds.
