= Mystic (roller coaster) =

Steel roller coaster at Walibi Rhône-Alpes

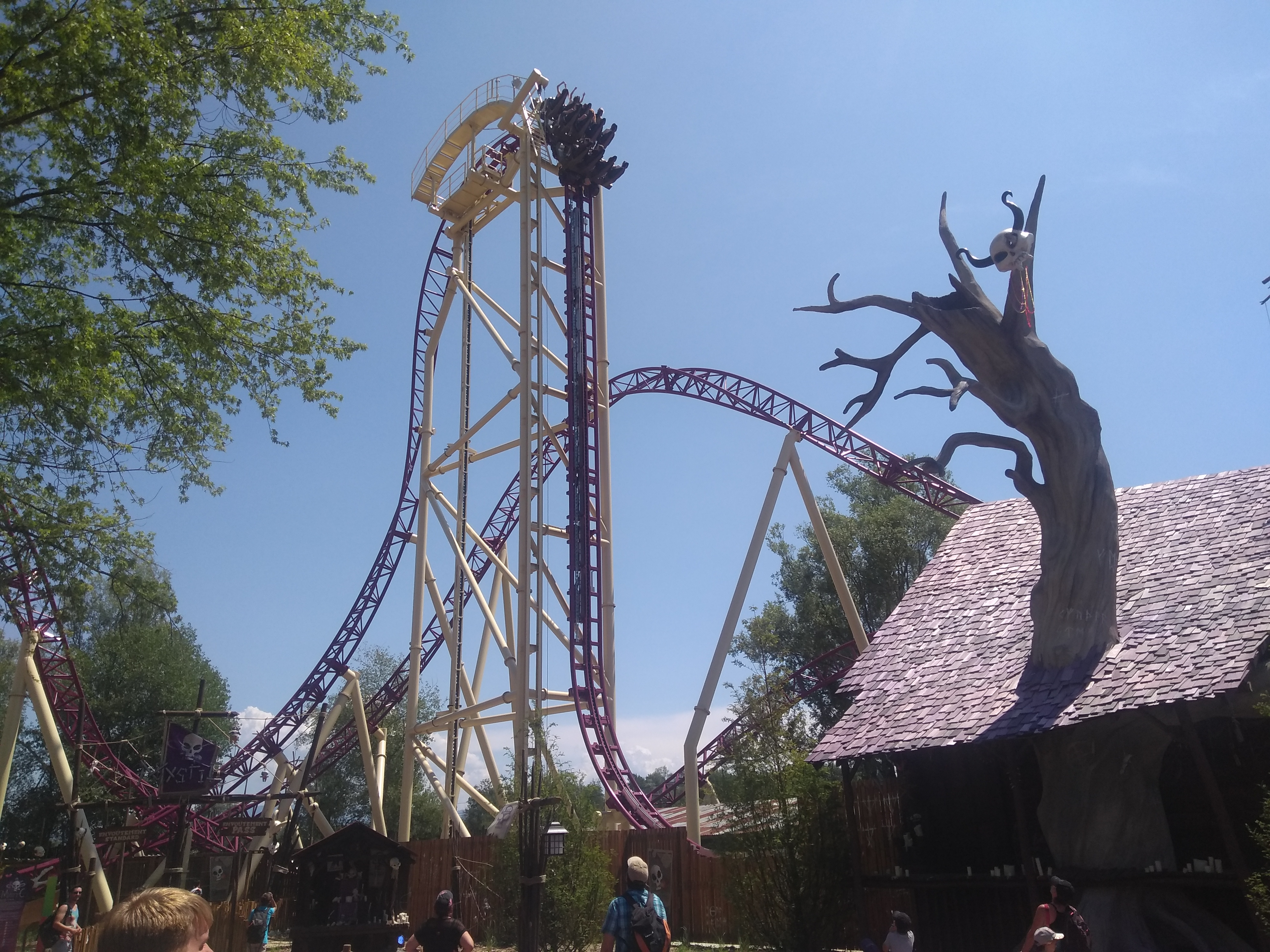

Walibi Rhône-Alpes
- Location: Walibi Rhône-Alpes
- Park section: Festival City
- Coordinates: 45.619997°N 5.571537°E
- Status: Operating
- Soft opening date: May 25, 2019; 5 years ago
- Opening date: May 30, 2019; 5 years ago
- Cost: €6,000,000
- Replaced: Bamba; QWADS

General statistics
- Type: Steel – Shuttle
- Manufacturer: Gerstlauer
- Model: Infinity Coaster
- Lift/launch system: Chain lift hill
- Height: 101.7 ft (31.0 m)
- Speed: 52.8 mph (85.0 km/h)
- Inversions: 3
- Duration: 1:45
- Capacity: 600 riders per hour
- Height restriction: 51 in (130 cm)
- Trains: 2 trains with 3 cars. Riders are arranged 4 across in a single row for a total of 12 riders per train.
- Physical Length: 1,509.2 feet (460.0 m)
- Total length Traversed: 1,886.5 feet (575.0 m)
- Website: Official website
- Single rider line Available
- Mystic at RCDB

Mystic is a steel roller coaster located at Walibi Rhône-Alpes in Les Avenières, France. The coaster marked the park's 40th anniversary as well as a headlining part of a decade-long, €25 million investment plan. The coaster was manufactured by Gerstlauer and traverses a total 1,886.5 feet (575.0 m) of track both forwards and backwards, at a top speed of 52.8 mph (85.0 km/h).

== History ==
During the IAAPA Expo 2017 in November 2017, Walibi owner Compagnie des Alpes and German manufacturer Gerstlauer signed off on a new upcoming coaster project. On December 8, 2017, Compaigne des Alpes and Walibi announced the addition of a yet-to-be-named coaster to celebrate the park's 40th anniversary in 2019, with an animated rendering showing off the full layout of the attraction. The coaster would be incorporated into a new area, Festival City, being built in the southwest corner of the park, where three new Zamperla rides were scheduled to debut in 2018. It would also contribute towards a 10-year, €25 million investment plan into the park, which had been kicked off in 2016 with the Gravity Group wooden coaster Timber.

Construction and development work started in and around September 3, 2018, and the park's Bamba (Mack Rides Calypso) and QWUADS (electric go kart ride) were removed to accommodate such. In December 2018, the park began drilling footers, and following consistent releases of concept artwork and ride animations, the name was confirmed to be Mystic on December 24, 2018.

Track and supports began arriving in January 2019, and the coaster was built at a speedy pace throughout the winter and spring. The ride's pair of trains arrived at the park on April 12, 2019, and testing began later that month. After soft-opening on May 25, Mystic had its official grand opening on May 30, 2019.

== Characteristics ==
=== Statistics ===
Mystic has a physical track length of 1,509.2 feet (460.0 m), a max height of 101.7 feet (31.0 m), and a top speed of 52.8 mph (85.0 km/h). Due to the backwards section of the ride, which is traversed twice, riders will travel through an advertised 1,886.5 feet (575.0 m) of track. Mystic features a vertical Lift hill and three inversions; a Zero-G Roll, a Dive Loop, and a twisted rollback spike. The latter became one of the world's first and only spike elements on a shuttle coaster to end upside-down; it was first performed on Cobra at Conny-Land in Switzerland with its "scorpion tail" element.

Mystic is serviced by two trains. Each one is made up of three cars with a single four-person row each, allowing for 12 riders per train. One will load in the station while the other traverses the layout. They re-enter the station via a turntable on the switch-track/brake run.

=== Model ===
Mystic was manufactured by German manufacturer Gerstlauer and is one of their Infinity Coaster models. In this case, the hardware and track elements is similar to the company's Euro-Fighter coaster brand, albeit they utilize longer trains, contain sometimes larger elements, and are considered to be a more evolved model. Gerstlauer stated in a press release that the unique ride layout came from the revolutionary and well received Switchback wooden coaster at ZDT's Amusement Park in Seguin, Texas, which was the first and only modern shuttle wooden coaster upon opening in 2015. The Flash: Vertical Velocity at Six Flags Discovery Kingdom in Vallejo, California, was also credited as the inspiration for the twisted rollback spike.

=== Theme ===
Mystic is part of the park's new-for-2018 Festival City, themed closely to New Orleans and its culture. However, Mystic is heavily themed around Louisiana Voodoo, and riders will tangle with the sinister Dr. Mystic and his practices. The theming and art direction of the attraction was designed by concept designer Fabien Manuel.

=== Soundtrack ===
The coaster's background soundtrack was produced by the German music producers IMAscore, who had worked on soundtrack projects for dozens of parks and coasters across Europe, such as Walibi Belgium's Tiki-Waka.

== Ride experience ==
Upon departing the station, the train climbs a 101.7-foot (31.0 m) tall vertical Lift hill before plunging down a 73° curved drop. Riders barrel over a Top hat and through a Zero-g roll in the direction of the ride station. Navigating a tight dive loop, the train breezes past the station and through the switch-track into the coaster's endgame portion; a 90° banked airtime hill similar to the wall stall elements on various RMC coasters, and a twisted rollback spike. This particular element twists riders upside down over park pathways and ends in a dead end of mangled track, forcing the train to roll backwards through the banked airtime hill once again. The train is stopped on the switch-track traversed just moments beforehand, and a turntable leads the train back into the station.
