= Mahuka =

Roller coaster at Walibi Rhône-Alpes

- Mahuka's train in the ride's inverted top hat

Walibi Rhône-Alpes
- Location: Walibi Rhône-Alpes
- Park section: Exotic Island
- Coordinates: 45.621893°N 5.571820°E
- Status: Operating
- Soft opening date: June 8, 2024; 2 years ago
- Opening date: June 15, 2024; 2 years ago
- Replaced: Aqualibi

General statistics
- Type: Steel – Launched
- Manufacturer: Intamin
- Model: Hot Racer
- Lift/launch system: Tire launch
- Height: 59.1 ft (18.0 m)
- Length: 1,968.5 ft (600.0 m)
- Speed: 41.6 mph (66.9 km/h)
- Inversions: 3
- Capacity: 600 riders per hour
- Height restriction: 120 cm (3 ft 11 in)
- Trains: 2 trains with 9 cars; riders arranged 1 across in a single row for a total of 9 riders per train
- Website: Official website
- Mahuka at RCDB

Mahuka is a single rail roller coaster located at Walibi Rhône-Alpes in Les Avenières, France. The coaster marked the park's 45th anniversary in 2024 as well as the second phase of their Polynesian Exotic Island area, allowing guests to escape from an ancient temple.

Intamin designed and manufactured the attraction, which features two launches and a signature double top hat element, connecting both an inverting and non-inverting element to the same structure.

== History ==
=== Background ===
Walibi Rhône-Alpes's Exotic Island area had its roots in a gradual reworking of the park's themes in 2014, laying a foundation for what could eventually be developed. Sister park Walibi Belgium concurrently began implementing their new Polynesian-themed Exotic World area with the opening Tiki Waka in 2018 and Kondaa in 2020. Splitting the two-phase precinct into lighter and more sombre themes, a similar model was pursued for Walibi Rhône-Alpes. Officials initially considered instead revamping the existing Aqualibi waterpark into a standalone year-round destination; it however remained closed in 2020 during the COVID-19 pandemic before management instead decided to remove it in favor of a dry park expansion. The attraction was first proposed by Compagnie des Alpes creative Julien Simon – given that Intamin was already a familiar collaborator of the chain – and developed over the course of four years.

The park first announced Exotic Island in May 2021, which would see three new rides spread out between 2022 and 2025 at a total investment of €15 million. Compagnie des Alpes and Intamin later publicly signed a contract on November 17, 2021 at the IAAPA Expo in Orlando, Florida, agreeing to produce a new coaster for Walibi Rhône-Alpes' 45th anniversary in 2024. The first phase of Exotic Island would open on June 25, 2022 with Tiki Academy, a spinning water ride from Zamperla.

=== Construction ===
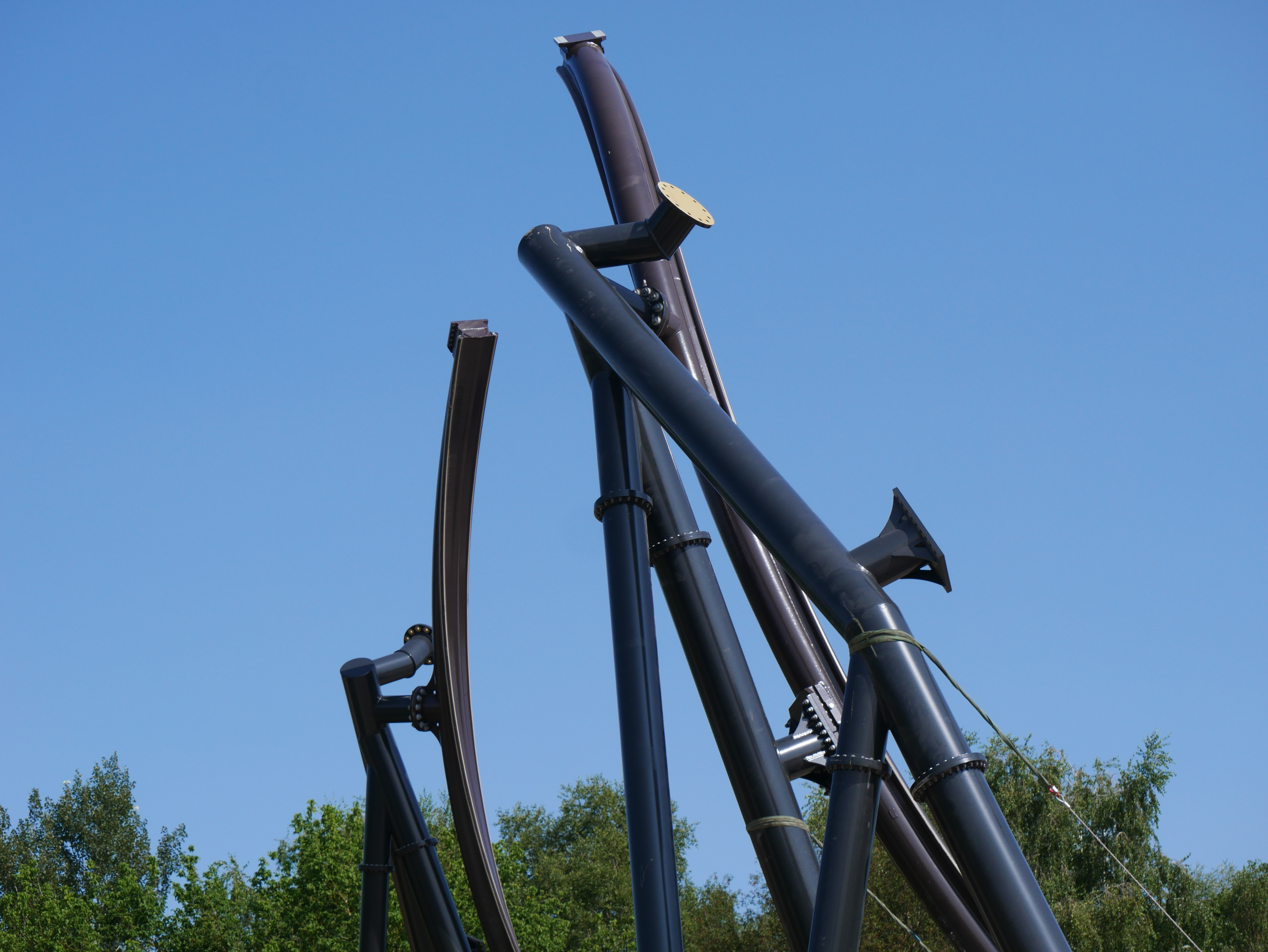
Mahuka under construction

Demolition of the former Aqualibi waterpark began during the summer of 2021 and continued into the winter, allowing for the first portions of the new area to be built. Foundations and rebar for the coaster itself didn't begin going into the ground until March 2023. Intamin coaster parts began arriving and were first installed in June. Assembly moved quickly throughout the summer, with the highest piece of track installed on the top hat on July 25, 2023. The final few rails were installed in October, with building construction and thematic work taking place over the following months. The coaster began commissioning with test laps in April 2024.

=== Promotion and Opening ===
Mahuka was officially announced as the name of the coaster on September 7, 2023. An animated onride point-of-view video was released by the park in January 2024, and a showreel of the train in the station was posted in April. A six-part miniseries was released through YouTube during the spring documenting Mahuka's development and construction. Following a soft-opening the weekend prior, Mahuka officially opened to the public on June 15, 2024.

== Ride experience ==
Exiting the station, riders turn to the left into the first of two launches, immediately being propelled into an inverted top hat. Riders quickly traverse a small speed hill, twisted airtime hill, and triple-down element before barreling through a corkscrew over the queue and station. This leads into the second launch, accelerating the train to its top speed of 41.6 mph (66.9 km/h) and re-entering the top hat, this time using a track section above the first element. The train traverses two airtime hills – a camelback and off-axis twist – before navigating a couple of low-to-the-ground twists and a wave turn to the right. A final heartline roll takes place over a pond before the train hits the brake run. Mahuka's entire duration lasts less than a minute.

== Characteristics ==
=== Statistics ===
Mahuka is 59.1 feet (18.0 m) tall, 1,968.5 feet (600.0 m) long, and reaches a top speed of 41.6 mph (66.9 km/h). Its layout includes two tire-propelled launches, three inversions, and 13 airtime moments. The coaster runs with two nine-passenger trains, each of which seats passengers inline for one rider per car.

=== Theme ===
Exotic Island as a whole is themed to a remote Polynesian island in the South Pacific Ocean, with the coaster set around an archaeological excavation. Riders disturb the God of Fire's temple, necessitating an exit lest they're taken prisoner; "Mahuka" is a translation of "escape" in Hawaiian. Previous to its final name, park officials had instead considered Lava Expedition, citing its volcanic setting.

Creative director Fabien Manuel designed Mahuka's scenographic base at the end of the first COVID-19 lockdown in 2020, also taking inspiration from the Musée du Quai Branly's Oceania exhibits. Sculpted concrete rock work around the attraction was provided by Petro Art Production while Themics Philippines Inc was responsible for its thematic accessories and set pieces. A custom soundtrack was also composed for the park by Audiogazer.

=== Model ===
Intamin had by September 2019 developed the Hot Racer, a single rail coaster model that utilizes motorized tire launches to propel the train. The first installation – Big Dipper at Luna Park Sydney – opened in December 2021. Mahuka's trains boast several upgrades over its predecessor, such as a revised chassis to better fit the track and new carbon fibre restraints that contribute to both a reduced weight and lower center of gravity. Walibi has posted a 120 centimetres (47 in) height requirement for Mahuka, deliberately accessible to guests as young as six or seven years old.
