= Toutatis (roller coaster) =

Launched roller coaster at Parc Astérix

Parc Astérix
- Location: Parc Astérix
- Park section: Festival Toutatis
- Coordinates: 49°8′10.6″N 2°34′10.8″E
- Status: Operating
- Opening date: April 8, 2023; 3 years ago
- Cost: €28,000,000

General statistics
- Type: Steel – Launched
- Manufacturer: Intamin
- Model: LSM Launch Coaster
- Lift/launch system: LSM
- Height: 51 m (167 ft)
- Speed: 110 km/h (68 mph)
- Inversions: 3
- Duration: 2:03
- Max vertical angle: 101°
- Capacity: 1,260 riders per hour
- Height restriction: 120–200 cm (3 ft 11 in – 6 ft 7 in)
- Trains: 3 trains with 5 cars; riders arranged 2 across in 2 rows for a total of 20 riders per train
- Website: Official site
- Physical Length: 1,075 metres (3,527 ft)
- Total length Traversed: 1,361 metres (4,465 ft)
- Toutatis at RCDB

Toutatis is a steel launched roller coaster located at Parc Astérix in Plailly, France. Toutatis was first announced at the IAAPA Orlando Expo in 2018 and upon opening became France's tallest and fastest coaster. It features four launches with a top speed of 107 km/h (66 mph) and a 51-metre (167 ft) top hat. It is named after Toutatis, a Celtic god who features in the Asterix books.

== History ==
=== Announcement ===
During a documentary helmed by TF1 on May 20, 2018, Frédéric Dubosc, head of construction at Parc Astérix, revealed that a magnetic-launched coaster, inspired by Taron at Phantasialand, was being developed for the park. On November 15, 2018, Intamin and park operator Compagnie des Alpes officially unveiled the unnamed launch coaster at the IAAPA Expo in Orlando, Florida. This was announced alongside Kondaa, another Intamin project that would debut at Walibi Belgium in 2021. The roller coaster would feature four launches – three of which would be achieved on a single multi-pass launch track – 23 airtime moments, and a 51-metre (167 ft) tall top hat with a 101° drop. The coaster would be built within a new 20,813 m^{2} area behind Trace du Hourra and was planned to open for the 2021 season.

=== Construction ===
In July 2019, reports surfaced that the coaster had been pushed back to 2022 by a lengthy process to secure first demolition permits, as much of the woods was under protection. The attraction development was further delayed to an opening date of 2023 by the impact of the COVID-19 pandemic. The full environmental impact assessment became publicly available in September 2020, detailing the construction schematics, budgets, and timeline of the coaster, set to be named Toutatis.

Land clearing and foundation work took place during later summer and the fall of 2021. The first coaster rails began to arrive at the park in early 2022, and construction quietly began while Gravity Group crews were onsite conducting a renovation of Tonnerre 2 Zeus. Track was placed at the highest point and topped off the coaster in June 2022.

In July 2022, project manager Damien Thibault revealed in an interview that the coaster would be accompanied by the addition of Chez Gyrofolix, a Nebulaz attraction from Italian manufacturer Zamperla. Toutatis began testing in January 2023, and a first official onride POV video was released in March. Toutatis officially opened to the public on April 8, 2023.

== Ride experience ==
Toutatis dispatches the station and immediately dips into the low speed first launch section, immediately bouncing up into a low-to-the-ground overbanked curve and right hand turnaround. A pair of off-axis bunny hills and switch track lead into the main swing launch, where the train builds up most of its speed through three launches – the first isn't powerful enough to help the train clear the ride's signature top hat, the second propels the train backwards and up a spike, and the third launch (and fourth overall) fully sends riders over the hill. Plunging down the top hat's 101° drop, riders make a quick turn into a large zero-g stall, exiting through a left hand turnaround. Riders complete the return trip through a trio of airtime hills – one straight, one twisted, and one fully banked to the side – before leading to a figure-8 turn overhead of the queue and underneath the top hat, which chiefly contains a heartline roll inversion. Riders make a right hand turn and traverse a final pair of airtime moments into the brake run. One full cycle on Toutatis lasts about 90 seconds.

== Characteristics ==
=== Statistics ===
Toutatis stands 51 metres (167 ft) tall, 1,075 metres (3,527 ft) long, and reaches a maximum speed of 107 km/h (66 mph) throughout the ride. The layout includes four launches – three of which occur on a swing launch between a vertical spike and top hat. Given this, riders travel a total length of 1,361 metres (4,465 ft). The coaster runs three trains of five cars, each of which seats two rows of two riders for a total of 20 passengers per train.

=== Theme ===
Toutatis (pronounced [towˈtaːtis] in Gaulish) is a Celtic god who was worshipped in ancient Gaul and Britain, and widely interpreted to be a tribal protector. In the Asterix comics, the name is commonly used within the catchphrase "By Toutatis!" to parody religious swearing. Toutatis' thematic set pieces were designed and produced by Bordeaux-based KAERU Theme Park Design, a firm that had also worked on OzIris. The music was composed by Benjamin Ribolet.

=== Budget ===
Throughout the development, manufacturing, and construction of Toutatis, Parc Astérix spent a total of €28 million (US$29.7 million). The recorded expenditure is as seen below;

Toutatis Construction Expenditures
Work	€25,000,000
Ride hardware	€13,000,000
Road construction	€2,350,000
Structural work	€3,950,000
Decoration/thematic work	€1,350,000
Other work (landscaping, equipment rentals)	€3,450,000
Studies	€1,800,000
Hazards	€1,200,000
Total	€28,000,000

== Rankings ==
Golden Ticket Awards: Top steel Roller Coasters
Year									1998	1999
Ranking									–	–
Year	2000	2001	2002	2003	2004	2005	2006	2007	2008	2009
Ranking	–	–	–	–	–	–	–	–	–	–
Year	2010	2011	2012	2013	2014	2015	2016	2017	2018	2019
Ranking	–	–	–	–	–	–	–	–	–	–
Year	2020	2021	2022	2023	2024	2025	2026			
Ranking	N/A	–	–	–	48	44	34			
