= Pantheon (roller coaster) =

Launched roller coaster at Busch Gardens Williamsburg

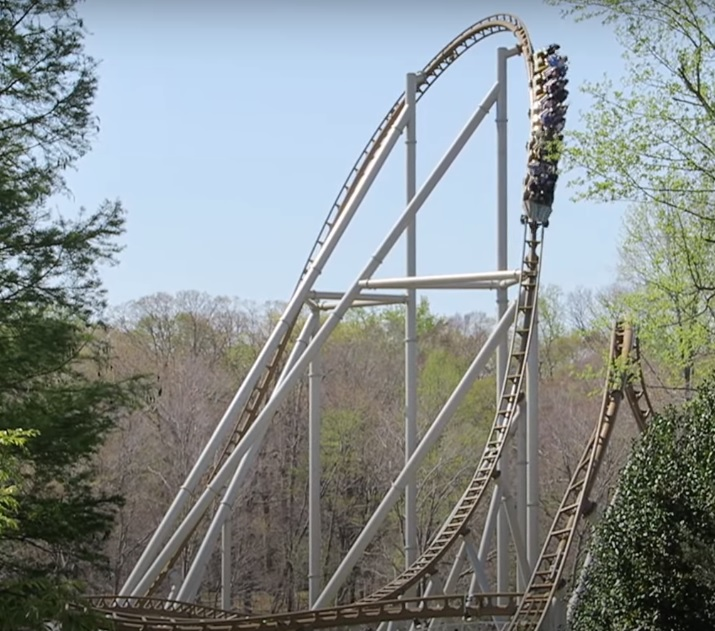

Busch Gardens Williamsburg
- Location: Busch Gardens Williamsburg
- Park section: Festa Italia
- Coordinates: 37.2339°N 76.6426°W
- Status: Operating
- Soft opening date: March 4, 2022
- Opening date: March 25, 2022

General statistics
- Type: Steel – Launched
- Manufacturer: Intamin
- Model: LSM Coaster
- Track layout: Steel
- Lift/launch system: LSM
- Height: 178 ft (54 m)
- Drop: 180 ft (55 m)
- Length: 3,328 ft (1,014 m)
- Speed: 73 mph (117 km/h)
- Inversions: 2
- Max vertical angle: 95°
- Capacity: 800 riders per hour
- Height restriction: 52–76 in (132–193 cm)
- Trains: 2 trains with 5 cars; riders arranged 2 across in 2 rows for a total of 20 riders per train
- Quick Queue available
- Pantheon at RCDB

Video

Pantheon is a steel roller coaster at Busch Gardens Williamsburg theme park in Williamsburg, Virginia, United States. Manufactured by Intamin, the roller coaster opened to park members on March 4, 2022 and features four launches, five airtime hills, and a 95-degree beyond vertical drop. The 178-foot-tall ride (54 m) inverts riders twice and reaches a maximum speed of 73 mph (117 km/h). Its theme is set to ancient Rome with a focus on the ancient culture's deities Jupiter, Mercury, Minerva, Neptune and Pluto.

Despite marketing for the ride claiming otherwise, Pantheon has never held the fastest multi-launch coaster record. Soaring With Dragon at Hefei Sunac Land held this record with top speeds of 77.7 mph (125.0 km/h) from its 2016 opening until 2024, when Top Thrill 2 opened at Cedar Point with top speeds of 120 mph (190 km/h).

== History ==
This ride was referred to as Project MMXX during the early construction stages and replaced an earlier project named Project Madrid, where Busch Gardens filed a 315 feet height waiver for a cancelled attraction.

The initial planning application for the ride was filed in February 2019, and it was eventually announced to be Pantheon on July 30, 2019. The announcement was held in the globe theater at the park and streamed live on the park's Facebook page. Leading up to the announcements there was a series of teasers posted on social media. By October 2019, photos indicated that construction of the track had begun. Pantheon's opening was ultimately delayed by two years due to the COVID-19 pandemic in Virginia. Busch Gardens announced in September 2021 that the ride would open the following March. The ride opened to the public on March 25, 2022, following a soft opening on March 4.

== Characteristics ==
Pantheon is 178 feet (54 m) tall, 3,328 feet (1,014 m) long, and reaches a maximum speed of 73 mph (117 km/h) throughout the ride. The ride's layout includes four launches – three of which take place on a swing launch between the vertical spike and top hat. This swing launch feature can also be found on Toutatis at Parc Astérix in France. Pantheon also has two inversions, which are a zero-g winder and a zero-g stall. It runs two trains of five cars, each of which seat two rows of two riders for a total of 20 passengers per train.

== Theme ==
Pantheon's theming around the Roman gods is subtle. Plaques throughout the ride's queue explain how different sections of the coaster relate to specific gods from the Roman pantheon. According to the plaques, the first launch of coaster is related to Minerva, Goddess of Wisdom, because the rider requires her to keep them safe on the coming journey. In the second section, Mercury, God of Speed relates to the swiftness of the ride's beginning. Next, a high peak relates to the God of the Sea, Neptune, as a representation of his sharp trident. Then another peak relates to Jupiter, King of the Gods and God of Weather, because it ascends to the sky. Finally, the end of the ride relates to Pluto, God of the Underworld, because the rider's journey is at a close.

== Rankings ==
Golden Ticket Awards: Top Steel Roller Coasters
Year									1998	1999
Ranking									–	–
Year	2000	2001	2002	2003	2004	2005	2006	2007	2008	2009
Ranking	–	–	–	–	–	–	–	–	–	–
Year	2010	2011	2012	2013	2014	2015	2016	2017	2018	2019
Ranking	–	–	–	–	–	–	–	–	–	–
Year	2020	2021	2022	2023	2024	2025	2026			
Ranking	N/A	–	43	49	–	41 (tie)	48			
