= Goudurix =

Amusement ride

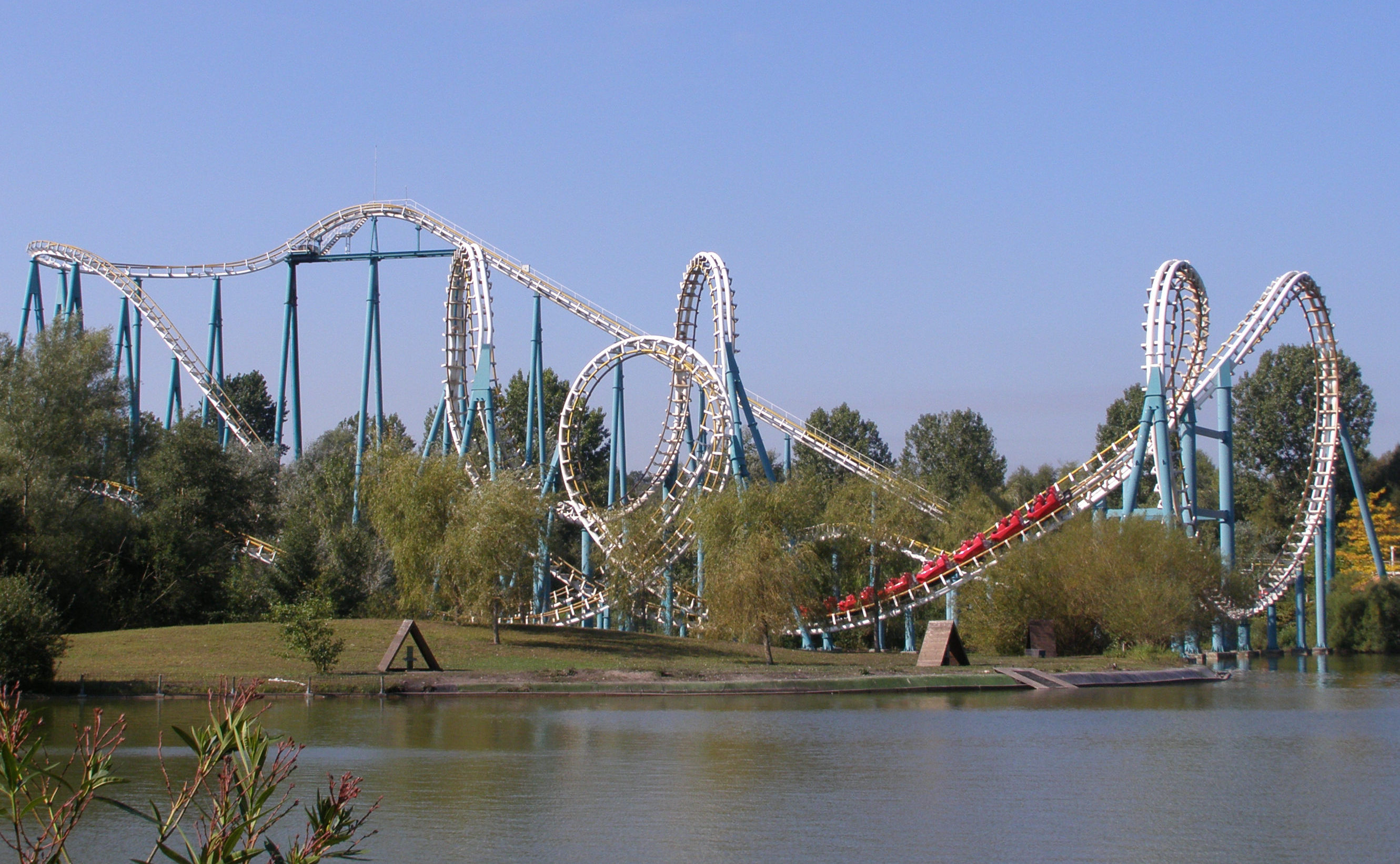
- The ride viewed from the lake, as seen before its change in colour scheme.

Parc Astérix
- Location: Parc Astérix
- Coordinates: 49°7′53″N 2°34′17″E
- Status: Operating
- Opening date: April 30, 1989

General statistics
- Type: Steel
- Manufacturer: Vekoma
- Designer: Vekoma
- Lift/launch system: Chain lift hill
- Height: 36 m (118 ft)
- Drop: 32.9 m (108 ft)
- Length: 950 m (3,120 ft)
- Speed: 90 km/h (56 mph)
- Inversions: 7
- Duration: 1:20
- Max vertical angle: 64°
- G-force: 3.9
- Height restriction: 140 cm (4 ft 7 in)
- Trains: 2 trains with 7 cars; riders arranged 2 across in 2 rows for a total of 28 riders per train
- Goudurix at RCDB

Goudurix is a steel roller coaster located in Parc Astérix in France. The Vekoma-built ride jointly held the European record for the greatest number of inversions upon its opening in 1989. The record was lost in 1995 to Dragon Khan in Spain. It is one of only two coasters in the world to feature a butterfly element (the other being Blue Hawk at Six Flags Over Georgia). In 2007, following the release of the animated movie Asterix and the Vikings, Viking theming was added to the station and nearby rides, in the form of a wooden Viking longboat. Goudurix is located in the back-west of the park (southeast geographically, since park entrance faces south), near Tonnerre 2 Zeus. The ride was repainted with a yellow and red track with grey supports, in a change from its previous white and yellow track with blue supports. It is one of the park's main attractions, along with the Tonnerre 2 Zeus, OzIris, Trace du Hourra, and Toutatis roller coasters.

It has seen multiple modifications, including new cars/trains and a complete re-tracking to improve the smoothness of the ride. For the 2025 season, the coaster received new trains from Vekoma.

== Ride elements ==
Goudurix has seven inversions in total:

- Batwing (2 inversions 1 element)
- Butterfly (2 inversions 1 element)
- Vertical Loop
- Double Corkscrew

== History ==
Goudurix has seen many changes of its track, electrical systems and theme since its creation.

- 1988: Goudurix built by Vekoma
- 2000: Trains are changed and a few different wheels are tested in order to improve the ride comfort
- 2007: Total recovery of electrical device
- 2007: Theming added to the station
- 2009: The whole track is entirely repainted in red and yellow (instead of white and blue)
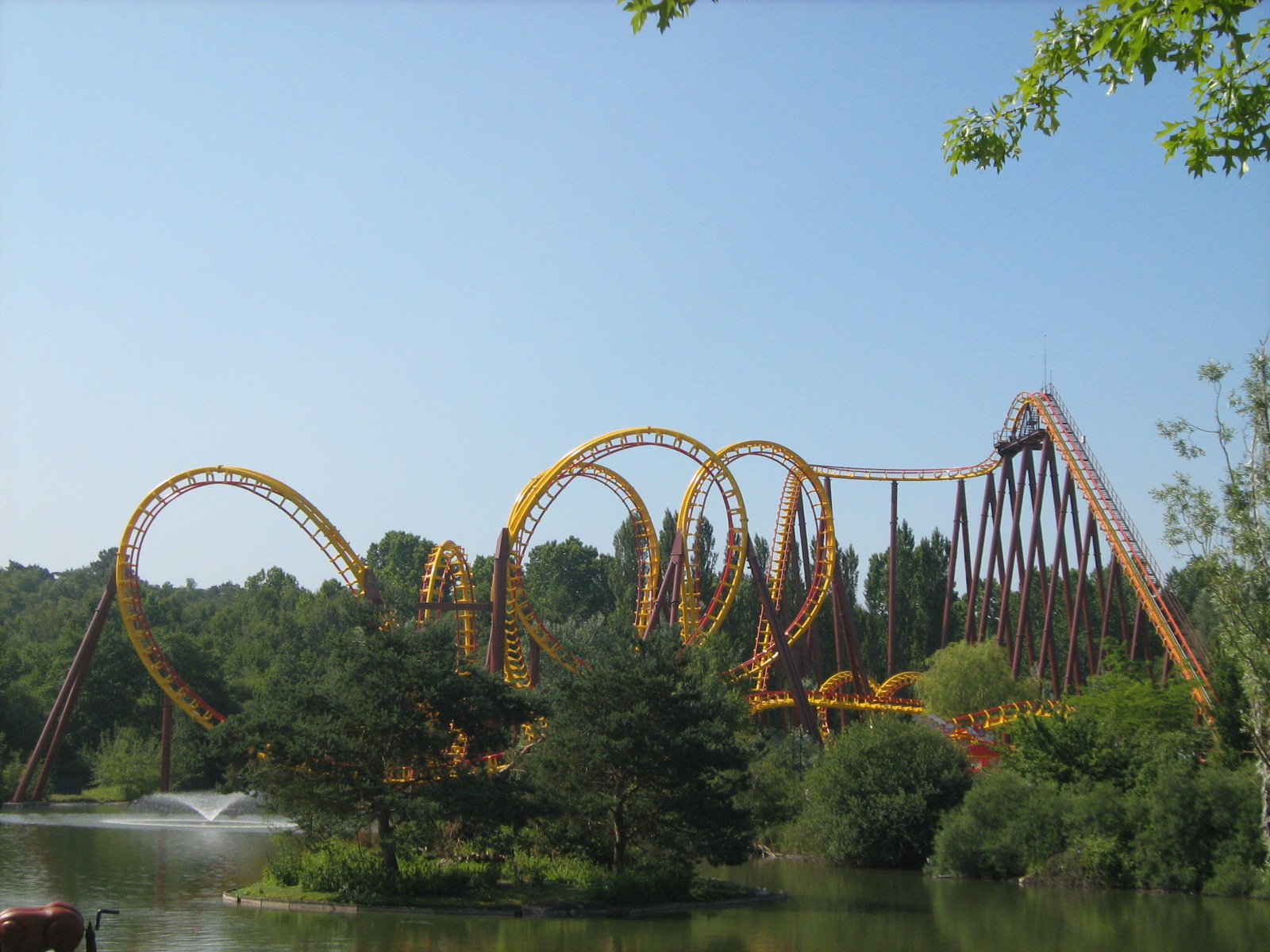
- 2010: A part of the trains are changed, making them heavier
- 2011: Test with new wheels to reduce vibrations
- 2013: Retracking
- 2025: New trains from Vekoma
