= Walygator Grand-Est =

Amusement park in Lorraine, France

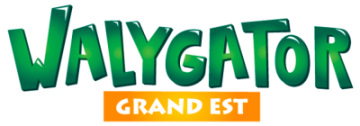

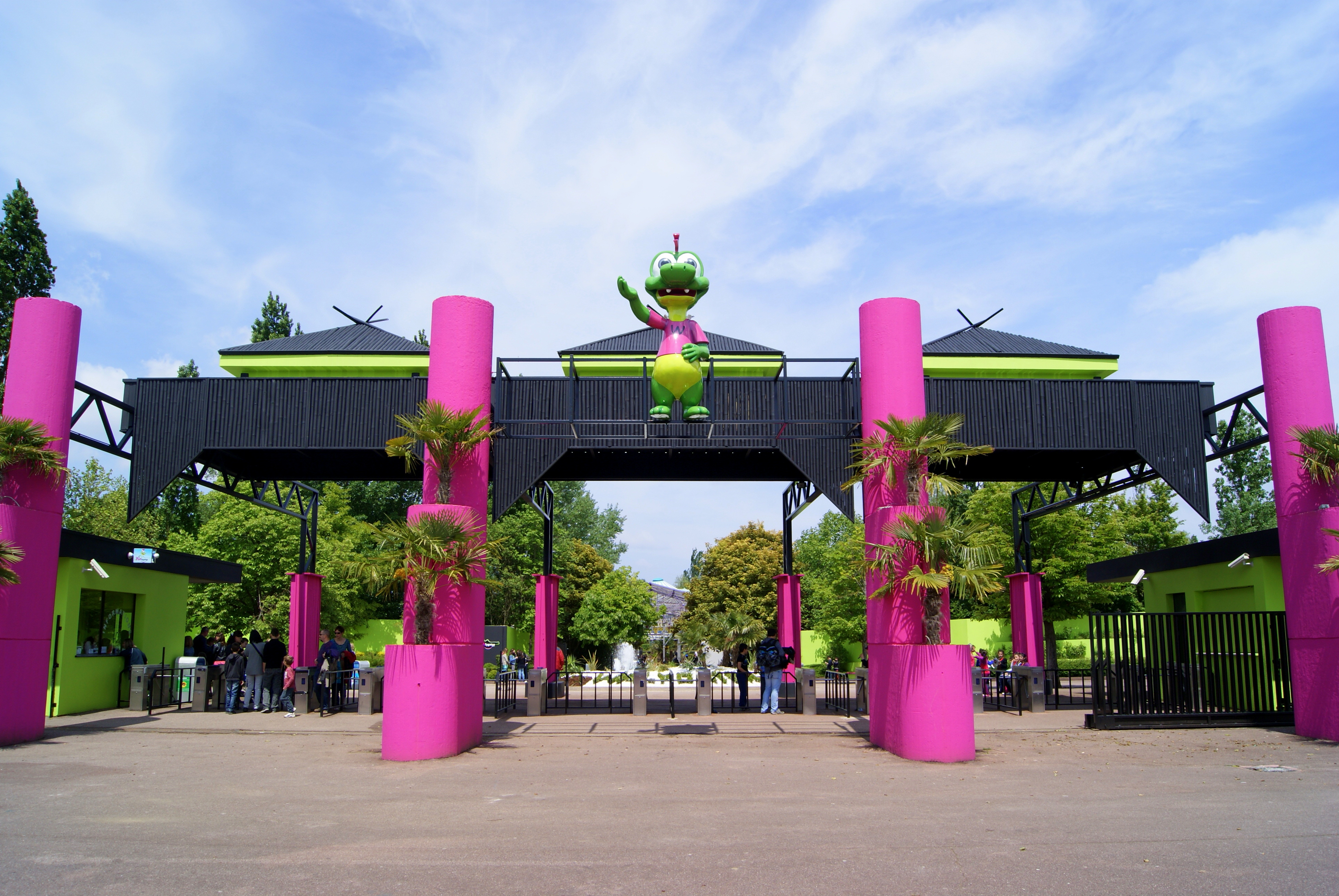
- Interactive map of Walygator Grand-Est
- Location: Maizières-les-Metz, France
- Coordinates: 49.2253°N 6.15611°E
- Status: Operating
- Opened: 1989
- Owner: Aspro Parks
- Operating season: April–October
- Area: 42 ha

Attractions
- Total: 39
- Roller coasters: 4
- Water rides: 5
- Website: www.walygatorparc.com

Walygator Grand-Est is an amusement park located in Maizières-les-Metz, Lorraine, France. Since its opening in 1989, the park has had a succession of different names: Big Bang Schtroumpf (Smurf), Walibi Schtroumpf, Walibi Lorraine and now Walygator Parc.

== History ==
First designed within the extant halls of Sacilor's Laminoir by the Leisure division HHCP Architects in Maitland, Florida, the theme park was named The New World of the Smurfs, or Le Nouveau Monde des Schtroumpfs. After a decision was made to abandon the mill, the park was re-designed by Grady Larkins and eventually opened up on May 9, 1989, as Big Bang Schtroumpf. Built on the site of the former steel mills of Sacilor, the park was then managed by Sorépark, a company headed by Pierre Jullien. Construction costs topped €110 million.

- In 1991, the park, on the verge of bankruptcy, is taken over by Walibi Group. Walibi's orange kangaroo mascot is brought alongside Peyo's little blue men: Walibi Schtroumpf was born.
- In 1998, parent Walibi Group is bought out by Premier Parks. At this point, the land on which Walibi Schtroumpf sits, totals 162 hectares (400 acres) of which only 42 hectares (100 acres) are in use.
- In 2003, Walibi Schtroumpf becomes Walibi Lorraine and the Smurfs characters are removed from the park.
- In 2004 Six Flags (Premier Parks' successor), which had ownership of the park since 1998, divests itself of its European operations (apart from Warner Bros. Movie World Madrid, which was sold back to Time Warner and renamed Parque Warner Madrid in 2006). The park changes hands to Star Parks, of London-based Palamon Partners.
- In 2006 Star Parks, in turn, sells the park to brothers Claude and Didier Le Douarin. Around the same time, the Walibi brand is sold to French leisure giant Compagnie des Alpes. The new management team is left with no option but to adopt a new name.
- In 2007, the park opens its doors under a new name: Walygator Parc.
- In 2010, the park opens a new roller coaster, "The Monster", an inverted roller coaster by Swiss manufacturer Bolliger & Mabillard. The ride had previously anchored Expoland in Japan, and is a clone of Raptor at Cedar Point.
- In 2013, the park, once again on the verge of bankruptcy, is sold to a group of investors made of Jacqueline Lejeune, Franck Déglin and Francois-Jérôme Parent.
- In 2016, Jacqueline Lejeune and Franck Déglin sell Walygator Parc to Aspro Parks.
- In 2020, the park was renamed Walygator Grand-Est following the purchase of Walibi Sud-Ouest and renaming as Walygator Sud-Ouest.

== Attractions ==
=== Present attractions ===
==== Roller coasters ====
Name	Opened	Image	Type	Manufacturer	Restrictions	Maximum height	Length	Maximum speed	Duration
Anaconda	1989		Wooden roller coaster	Bill Cobb	> 120 cm	36 m	1200 m	90 km/h	2:30
Comet	1989		Hurricane	Vekoma	> 120 cm.	590 m		65 km/h	1:25
Family Coaster	2007		Kids' roller coaster	Pinfari	> 85 cm when accompanied by an adult	4 m	132 m	15 km/h	1:30
The Monster	2010		Inverted roller coaster	Bolliger & Mabillard	> 140 cm.	40 m	1200 m	90 km/h	2:28

==== Water attractions ====
Name	Opened	Image	Type	Manufacturer
Dino-Raft	1989		River rapids ride	Alsthom and Soquet
Splash Kids	1989		Junior Log Flume	Zamperla
Waly Boat Tour & Co	1989		Tow boat ride	Mack Rides
Grizzly Falls	1991		Water slides	Van Egdom
Rivière Sauvage	1992		Log flume	Soquet

==== Thrill attractions ====
Name	Opened	Image	Type	Manufacturer	Notes
Caribbean Boat	1992		Pirate ship	HUSS Rides	
G-Lock	2014		Air Race	Zamperla	
Mistral	1992		Wave Swinger	Zierer	
Space Shoot	1998		Space Shot	S&S Worldwide	Closed from 2010 to 2012.
Terror House	2007		Haunted house	Walygator Grand Est	Closed from 2013 to 2016 due to a lack of fire protection and emergency exits.

==== Family rides ====
Name	Opened	Image	Type	Manufacturer
Canyon City Express	1989		Train ride	Zamperla
Carrousel	2013		Merry-go-round	Concept 1900
Dino Bike	2015		Magic Bikes	Zamperla
Far West Tour	1989		Monorail	Mack Rides
Pavillon Dansant	2011		Wipeout	Gerstlauer
Peter Pan	2007		Carousel	Mack Rides
Sherif Shooter	2004		Mini drop tower	Zamperla
Sheriff Academy	2009		Desperados	Alterface
Tea Cup	1992		Teacups	Mack Rides
Waly Express	2012		Train ride	SBF Visa Group
Walynosaure	1989		Red Baron	Zamperla

==== Children's rides ====
Name	Opened	Image	Type	Manufacturer
The Golden Nugget	1989		Red Baron	Zamperla
Le Canoë	2007		Junior Pirate Ship	SBF Visa Group
Les Petits Pirates	2007		Red Baron	SBF Visa Group
Rocky Rangers	1991		Truck ride	Sartori Rides
Steam Machine	2004		Crazy Bus	Zamperla
Thunder Horses	2008		Electric horse riding track	Soquet
USA Balloons	2004		Samba Balloon	Zamperla
Waly Mille Pattes	2009		Train ride	SBF Visa Group

=== Former attractions ===
Name	Opened	Closed	Image	Type	Manufacturer	Notes
Abracadabra	1989	2006		Playground	Unknown	Destroyed by a fire.
Accro-Game	2013	2017		Climbing parcours	Unknown	
Air One Maxxx	2015	2015		Afterburner	KMG	Rented by the park from June to October 2015, the attraction belongs to Dominique Lerendu, a fairground operator.
Baby Parc	2014	2021		Indoor playground	I Depot Play	
Crash Cars	1991	2011		Bumper cars	Unknown	
Gonflables	2008 / 2012	2013		Inflatable castles	Unknown	Replaced by Silver Express.
Grande Roue	2008	2013		Ferris wheel	Nauta Bussink	Fair ride that was rented by the park.
Maestro	1989	2018		Merry-go-round	Zamperla	
Mini-Golf Indoor	2013	2020		Miniature golf	Unknown	Removed after being closed because of the COVID-19 pandemic.
Polyp	2008	2012		Octopus	Schwarzkopf	Fair ride that was rented by the park.
Reaktor	1989	1997		Enterprise	HUSS Rides	Relocated to Walibi Holland.
Silver Express	2014	2016		Train ride	Kid Steam	Replaced by Waly Express.
Sismic Panic	1989	2003		Simulator ride	Huismann	
Spooky Mansion	2015	2015		Inflatable castle	Unknown	
Südseewellen	2011	2019		Orbiter	Schwarzkopf	Relocated to Pirat Parc in Gruissan.
Tam Tam	2007	2016		Kiddie rides	SBF Visa Group	
Tang'Or	2005	2010		Topple Tower	HUSS Rides	Relocated to Dragon Park Ha Long.
Waly-Twister	2008	2012		Paratrooper	Heintz Fahtze	
Zig-Zag	2003	2003		Wild Mouse	Mack Rides	Fair ride that was rented by the park.

== Location ==
The park is located 15 kilometres (9.3 mi) north of Metz, at 47.15984 N,2.988281 E.

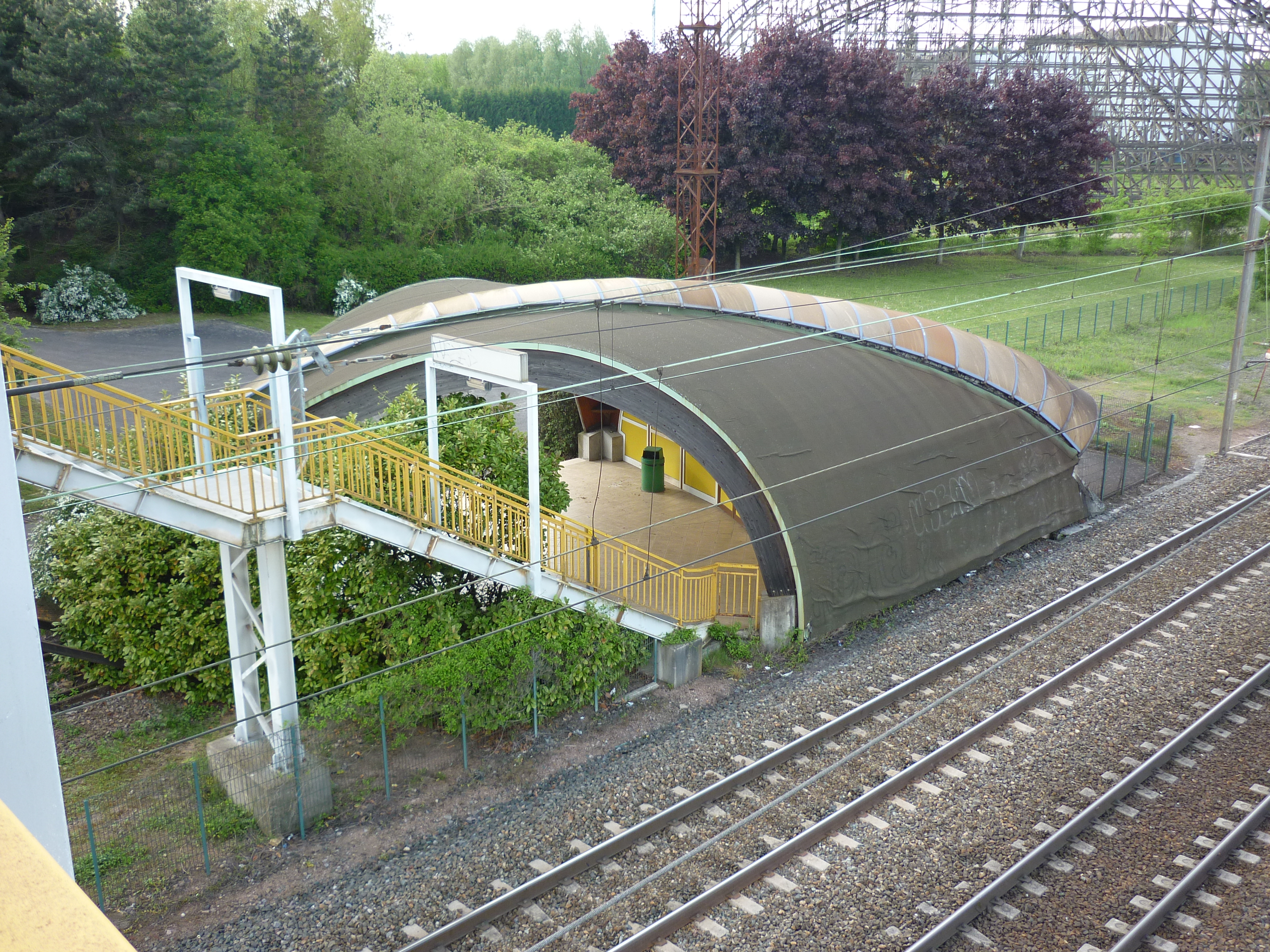
It is served by the eponymous SNCF station, Walygator-Parc station.
