= Romus et Rapidus =

Water ride at Parc Astérix, France

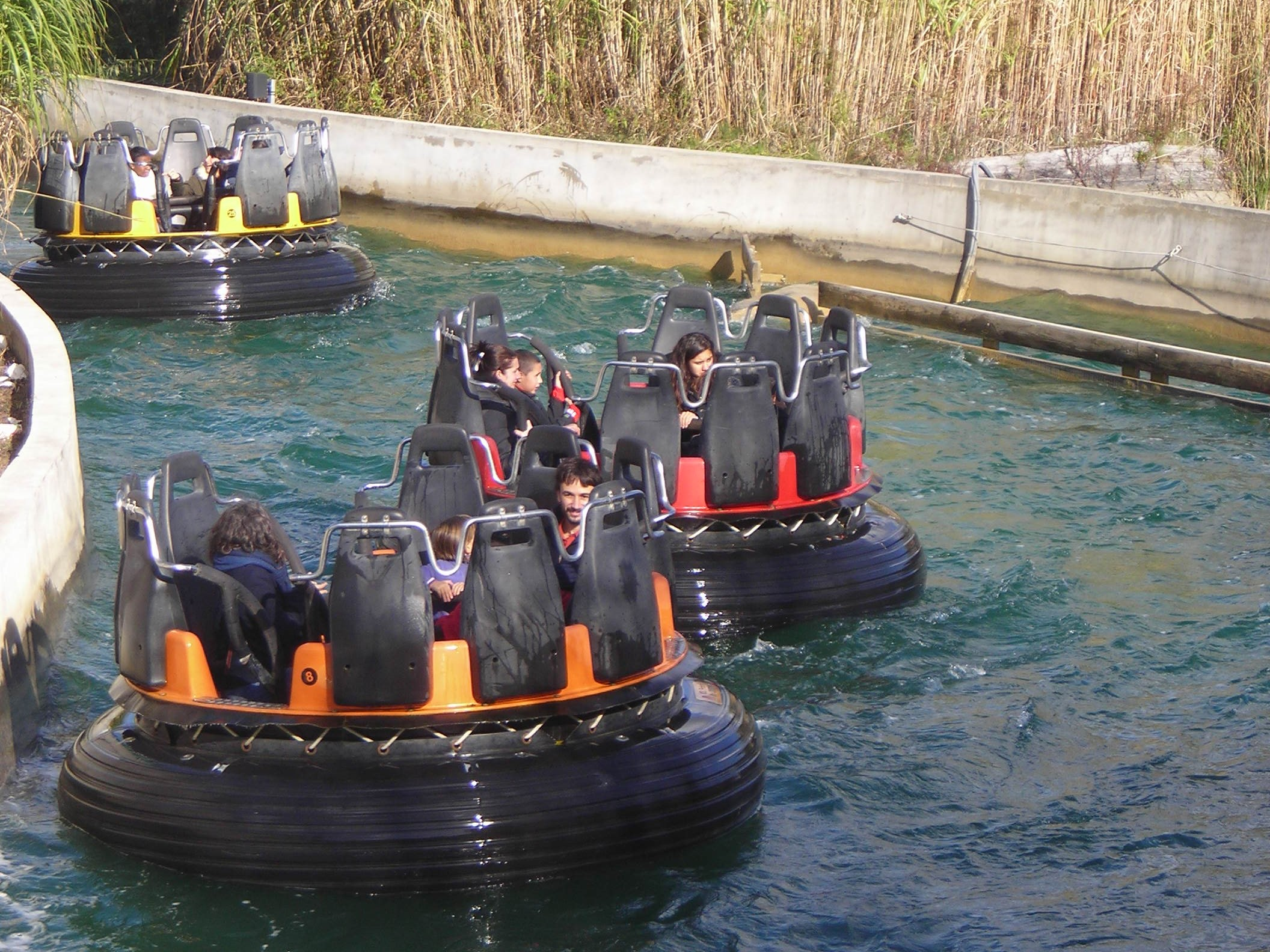

Parc Astérix
- Name: La Descente du Styx (1989-2006)
- Area: L'Empire Romain
- Coordinates: 49°08′04″N 02°34′13″E
- Status: Operating
- Opening date: April 30, 1989

Ride statistics
- Attraction type: River rapids ride
- Manufacturer: Intamin
- Model: River rapids
- Length: 540 m (1,770 ft)
- Riders per vehicle: 9
- Height restriction: 100 cm (3 ft 3 in)
- Virtual queue: Filotomatix Available
- Must transfer from wheelchair

Romus et Rapidus (Latin pronunciation: [ˈroːmus et ˈrapidus]) is a river rapids ride operating at Parc Astérix, in Plailly, France. The ride is based on the Roman mythology tale of Romulus and Remus, the mythical founders of Rome. In 2006, a young boy fell from his raft and drowned.
