= The Monster (Walygator Parc) =

Steel roller coaster

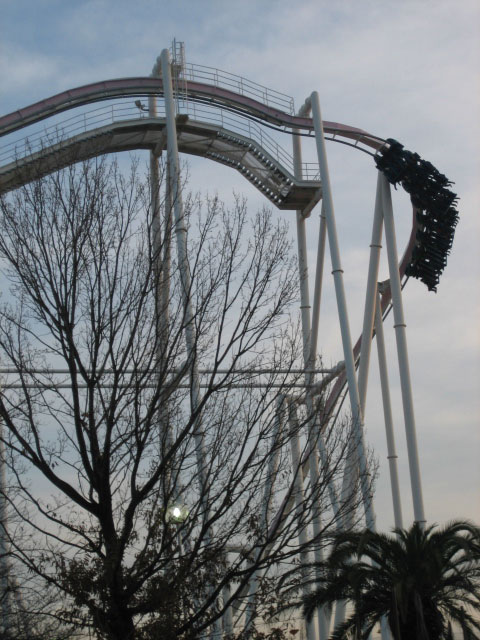
- The Monster, as Orochi at Expoland

Walygator Parc
- Coordinates: 49.2299°N 6.1581°E
- Status: Operating
- Opening date: July 9, 2010
- Cost: $7 million

Expoland
- Coordinates: 34°48′14.7″N 135°32′03″E
- Status: Removed
- Opening date: 1996
- Closing date: 2007

General statistics
- Type: Steel – Inverted
- Manufacturer: Bolliger & Mabillard
- Designer: Werner Stengel
- Model: Inverted Coaster - Raptor
- Height: 131.3 ft (40.0 m)
- Length: 3,937 ft (1,200 m)
- Speed: 55.9 mph (90.0 km/h)
- Inversions: 6
- Duration: 2:28
- Height restriction: 140 cm (4 ft 7 in)
- Trains: 2 trains with 8 cars; riders arranged 4 across in a single row for a total of 32 riders per train
- The Monster at RCDB

The Monster is an inverted roller coaster located at Walygator Grand-Est, Maizières-lès-Metz, Lorraine, and was the first in France to be built by Bolliger & Mabillard. The roller coaster originally opened in 1996 at Expoland in Japan as Orochi, which closed in 2007 and was later relocated to Walygator Parc, where it reopened on 9 July 2010.

== History ==
=== Orochi ===
On the 15th of March 1996, Orochi opened in Expoland in Osaka, Japan, exactly 26 years after the park opened. Following the derailment of the Fujin Raijin II in 2007, the ride closed on the 9th of December in the same year. The park would not operate after the incident.

=== The Monster ===
While the owners of Walygator, Didier Le Douarin and Claude Le Douarin, were at a trade fair in Germany, they found the ride being advertised to relocate. The ride was transported to Walygator in 120 containers The ride took 13 months from the start of the deconstruction of Orochi to the opening of Monster.

Construction on the ride began later than expected because of harsh weather conditions. "First we had frost: it was impossible to pour the concrete to make foundations. Then, the wind came, dangerous for the cranes." The opening of the ride would be delayed two times. It was originally meant to open in April, however it was pushed back to June 20th. It was then further pushed back, due to the German inspection body TÜV not validating the ride. There were also plans to paint the track and supports black and yellow after the initial opening date, but this came to fruition. On the 9th of July 2010, the ride opened after months of delays.

While being advertised, the Monster's speed was said to be 110km/h (68mph) and the height to be 50m (164ft). However, this was not true as Orochi was advertised as 56mph and 131ft tall.

In 2016, plans were shown which included an overhaul of the Monster's area, adding a station roof and surroundings with a pirate theme. The station, and attached theming, were added in 2025 alongside a repaint of the ride's first turn

== Ride experience ==
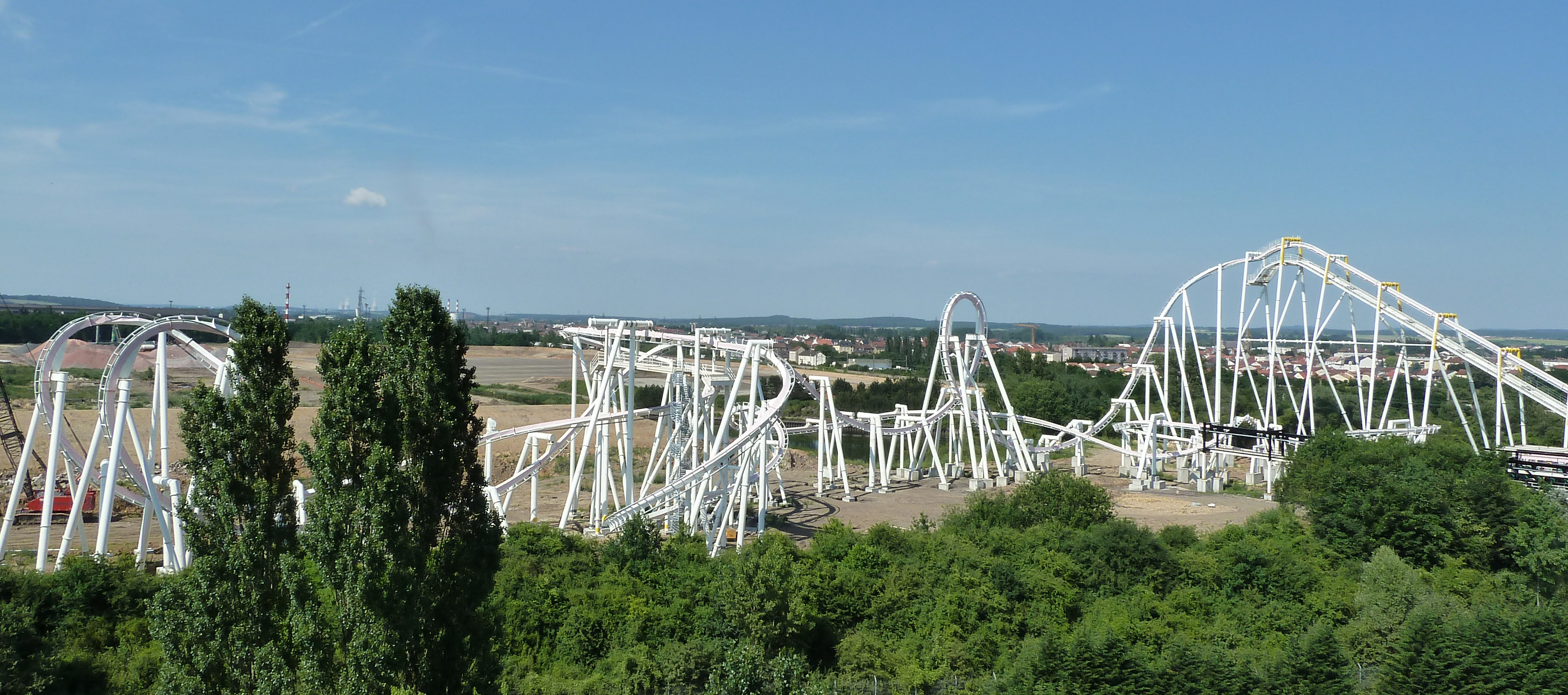
The Monster

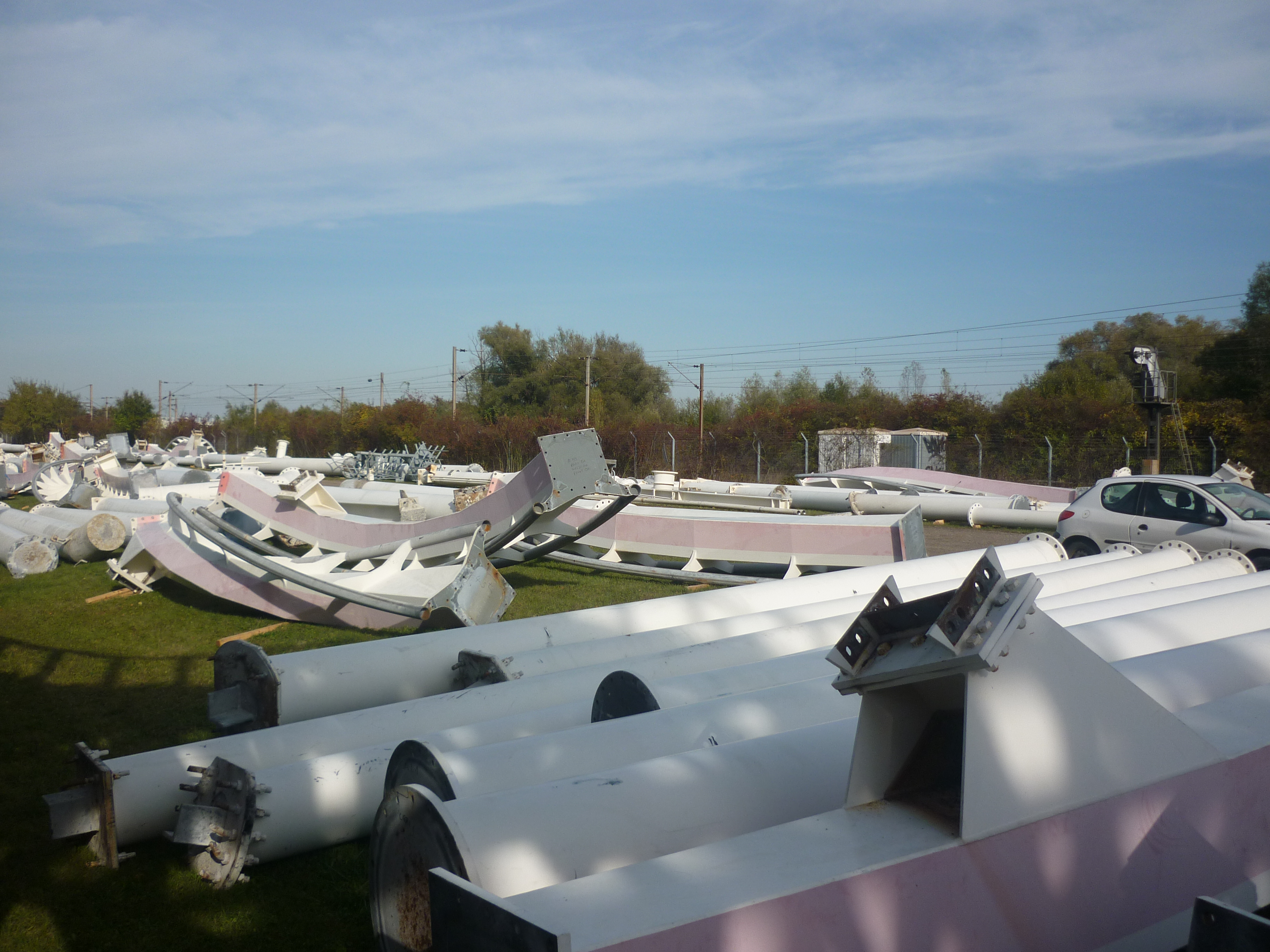
The Monster's track & supports at Walygator Parc

Monster's entrance and queue is located directly underneath the station. After leaving the station, the ride begins with a left-hand turn into the lift that ascends 131 feet (40 m). At the top, the inverted train dips slightly before turning left ninety degrees as it drops 119 feet (36 m) down the first hill. From the bottom the train immediately enters a vertical loop. Next is the zero-g roll followed by the cobra roll which inverts riders twice.

After the cobra roll, the train climbs through an upward spiral and enters a straight section. Next the train dives down to the right transitioning into another brief straight section of track. Riders then enter the first of two corkscrews which rotates the train 360 degrees to the left. The track straightens briefly again before turning to the right and entering a short dip before taking riders into the second corkscrew. The ride finishes with a 1.5 revolution flat helix where riders encounter strong positive G-forces before making one last left turn into the final brake run. The ride is identical in layout to Raptor at Cedar Point, the only deviation being the absence of a midcourse brake run.
