= OzIris =

Egyptian-themed roller coaster at Parc Astérix

Parc Astérix
- Location: Parc Astérix
- Park section: Egypt
- Coordinates: 49.134221°N 2.566260°E
- Status: Operating
- Opening date: 7 April 2012
- Cost: About $14 million for the ride and about $9.5 million for the Egyptian themed area

General statistics
- Type: Steel – Inverted
- Manufacturer: Bolliger & Mabillard
- Model: Inverted Coaster
- Lift/launch system: Chain lift hill
- Height: 131.2 ft (40.0 m)
- Drop: 114.8 ft (35.0 m)
- Length: 3,280 ft (1,000 m)
- Speed: 56 mph (90 km/h)
- Inversions: 5
- Duration: About 2:15
- Capacity: 1600 riders per hour
- Height restriction: 51 in (130 cm)
- Trains: 3 trains with 8 cars. Riders are arranged 4 across in a single row for a total of 32 riders per train.
- OzIris at RCDB

OzIris is an inverted roller coaster designed by Bolliger & Mabillard operating at Parc Astérix in France since 7 April 2012. It is only one of two Bolliger & Mabillard inverted coasters in France, the other being The Monster at Walygator Parc. It is named after Iris, a character from The Twelve Tasks of Asterix.

== Ride ==
OzIris includes five inversions after the lift hill that stands 40 metres (130 ft) in height. After the initial drop, a dive loop follows going 30 metres (98 ft) upside-down (OzIris is the first inverted roller coaster to feature a dive loop). The track then manoeuvres an overbanked to the right, banked at about 110°, followed by a vertical loop of 25 metres (82 ft). The track then passes into a trench and into an Immelmann of 22 metres (72 ft), and then a second overbanked turn 15 metres (49 ft). The coaster's track then descends to an 6 metres (20 ft) deep underwater tunnel. A corkscrew comes after the tunnel, then an upward turn to the next inversion a zero-G roll, after this inversion the track follows a twisted course until reaching the main brake zone, and then back into the station.

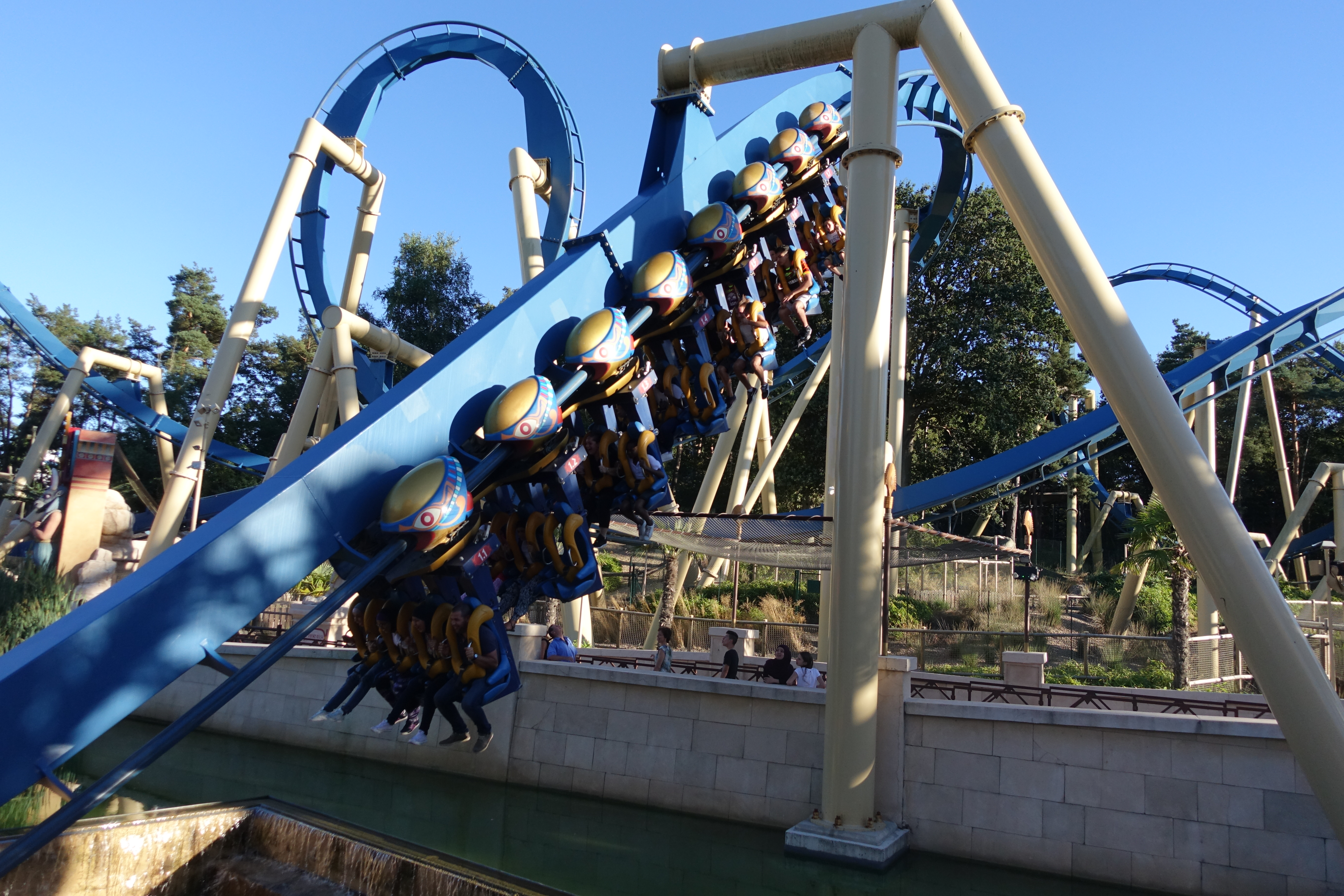
Oziris in 2016

=== Theme ===
OzIris is part of a 2012 new egyptian themed zone inspired by one of the Asterix comic book series Asterix and Cleopatra (as well as the movie The Twelve Tasks of Asterix) which expanded the park by ten percent. With exotic plants, palm trees, rocks, lake, Egyptian monuments and a huge temple, the new area combines the characteristic of the Asterix cartoon with this custom design roller coaster. With the new theme for the park, the Zierer roller coaster Périférix was rethemed to SOS Numérobis to fit the theme.

=== Storyline ===
After walking outside below security nests, riders step into Iris' temple. In there, riders get to learn about different experiences Iris made with hypnotising, and they also get hypnotised. The coaster consists in Iris' ultimate experience: making people fly. (Hence the inverted coaster) Before the train is dispatched, riders can hear Iris' voice saying his hypnotising catchphrase "By Osiris and by Apis, you are now birds! Yes, birds!"

== Awards ==
In 2012, OzIris was ranked by Amusement Today's Golden Ticket Awards as the fifth-best new ride (tied with Skyrush at Hersheypark), garnering six percent of the vote.

Golden Ticket Awards: Best New Ride for 2012
Ranking	5

== See also ==
- 2012 in amusement parks
