= Jora Vision =

Dutch design company

Jora Vision is a Dutch designer and show builder for theme parks, zoos, family entertainment centres, tourist destinations and museums. Since the 1990s Jora Vision has been active in the design, development and construction of entertainment venues. The company is located in Rijnsburg and employs around 50 people.

== History ==
Owner Jan-Maarten de Raad (1966) started a trade in dried flowers during the 1980s, later switching to artificial plants. The company added other elements to its portfolio, like artificial rocks, ponds and Roman arcs, and began to decorate entire venues rather than just selling decorative pieces. Jora provided plants, flowers and other decoration for swimming pools, hospitals and hotels. It imported most of its materials from Asia, but designed and manufactured some decorations in its own workshop as well.

The company founded a design department and increased its theming efforts, which led to the company designing and building attractions of its own, or parts of them. In the Netherlands it has done work for the Efteling, Walibi Holland, Wildlands Adventure Zoo and Madurodam. In Europe Jora Vision has designed and built for Parc Astérix, Futuroscope, Walibi Belgium, Europa Park, Disneyland Paris and Kolmården Wildlife Park. Currently the Chinese market is as much a focus for the company as is Europe.

Jora Vision changed its name to saD B.V. a matter of days before declaring insolvency during the Wildlands project in Emmen, Netherland. The company owed around 300 000 euro to 16 companies and a number of self-employed independent contractors.

== Awards ==
The Themed Entertainment Association has distinguished the work of Jora Vision in its Thea award for outstanding achievements, in 2010, 2012, 2015 and 2016.
