= Walibi Rhône-Alpes =

Amusement park in France

- Previously known as Avenir Land (1979–1988)
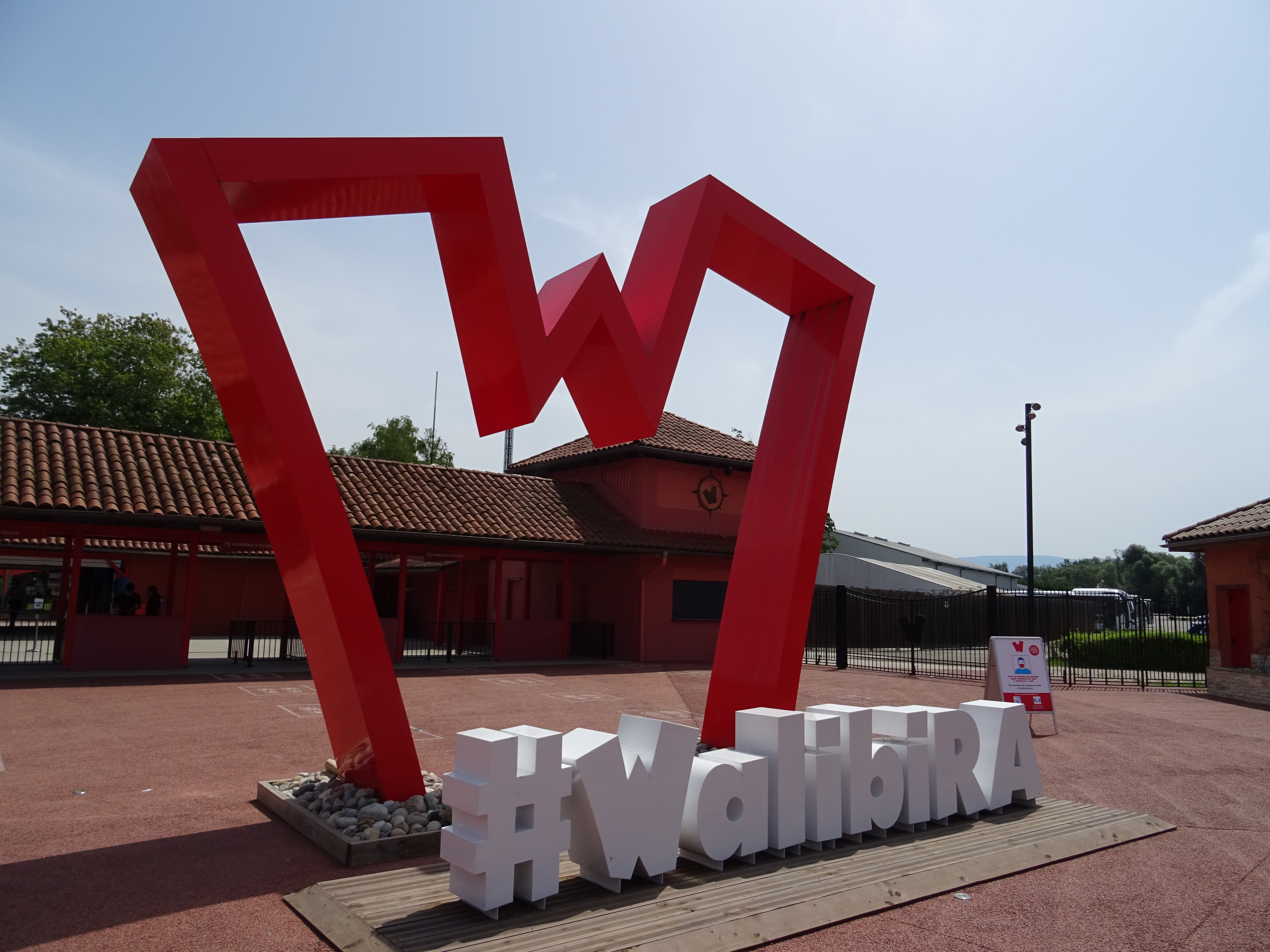
- Interactive map of Walibi Rhône-Alpes
- Location: Les Avenières, Rhône-Alpes, France
- Coordinates: 45°37′17″N 5°34′13″E
- Opened: 1979
- Owner: Compagnie des Alpes
- Operating season: April–October

Attractions
- Total: 27
- Roller coasters: 6

Walibi Rhône-Alpes is a French theme park located in the commune of Les Avenières, in the Isère department. It is the largest theme park in the Rhône-Alpes region, containing more than 33 rides and covering an area of 35 hectares. It is a sister park to Walibi Belgium, which was created in 1975 by Eddy Meeùs, a Belgian businessman. The name "Walibi" comes from the three municipalities in which the Walibi Belgium park is located: Wavre, Limal and Bierges.

The park had an income of 8.8 million euros in 2005, and it greets over 400,000 visitors yearly.

As of 2006, the park is owned and operated by Compagnie des Alpes, which also owns many theme parks and ski resorts across Europe.

== History ==
The park opened in 1979 under the name Avenir Land. The Walibi group acquired the park in 1989 and renamed it Walibi Rhône-Alpes.

Walibi became the mascot of the park.

In 1986, Walibi introduced water rides with the creation of a water park called Aqualibi. It would be given a makeover in 2006, becoming L'Île aux Pirates (French for Pirates' Island), and featuring a Caribbean theme.

=== Sale to Six Flags ===
In 1998, the park changed hands once again when it was bought by Six Flags as part of the American company's international expansion.

=== Sale to Star Parks ===
However, six years later, in 2004, Six Flags sold most of its European parks (including Walibi Rhône-Alpes) to Star Parks. The exception was Warner Bros. Movie World Madrid, which was sold back to Time Warner and renamed Warner Bros. Park and later Parque Warner Madrid in 2006. The Walibi parks were transferred to Compagnie des Alpes the following year and have belonged to the French company ever since.

On June 20, 2009, six park employees lost their lives in a helicopter crash. Due to this incident, the park was closed to the public from June 21, 2009 to June 26, 2009.

Like its sister parks in Belgium and Holland, the park began to go down a more themed route in the 2010s. Despite being a smaller park, the park still received regular investments, including two roller coasters, Timber (anchoring a farm-themed area) and Mystic (anchoring a horror retheme of the front right of the park). The water park closed with the park after the 2019 season and was replaced by the themed area Exotic Land for the 2022 season.

== Rides and attractions ==
=== Present attractions ===
==== Roller coasters ====
Name	Photo	Opened	Type	Manufacturer	Area
Generator		1988	Boomerang	Vekoma	Explorer Adventure
Coccinelle		1992	Tivoli Large	Zierer	Exotic Island
WoodStock Express		2002	Wild mouse	Zamperla	Explorer Adventure
Timber!		2016	Wooden roller coaster	The Gravity Group	Explorer Adventure
Mystic		2019	Infinity Coaster	Gerstlauer	Festival City
Mahuka	framelesse	2024	Single-rail launched roller coaster	Intamin	Exotic Island

==== Water rides ====
Name	Photo	Opened	Type	Manufacturer	Area
Gold River		1989	River rapids ride	Intamin	Explorer Adventure
Tam Tam Adventure		1992	Tow boat ride	Soquet	Exotic Island
Surf Music		2000	Water slides	Van Egdom	Explorer Adventure
Bambooz River		2012	Log flume	Interlink / Soquet	Exotic Island
Concert'O		2013	Junior Log Flume	Interlink	Explorer Adventure
Tiki Academy		2022	Watermania	Zamperla	Exotic Island

==== Thrill rides ====
Name	Photo	Opened	Type	Manufacturer	Area
Le Galion		1989	Pirate ship	HUSS Rides	Explorer Adventure
Le Totem		1998	Drop tower	S&S Worldwide	Festival City
Hurricane		2018	Star Flyer	Zamperla	Festival City
AirBoat		2020	NebulaZ	Zamperla	Festival City

==== Family attractions ====
Name	Photo	Opened	Type	Manufacturer	Area
Carrousel		2014	Merry-go-round	Concept 1900	Festival City
Dock'N Roll		2018	Rockin' Tug	Zamperla	Festival City
Festival Station		1979	Miniature railway	Soquet	Festival City
L’Expédition Perdue		2026	Parcourse	Kinderland	Exotic Island
Le Passage Oublié		2026	Maze	Walibi Rhône-Alpes	Exotic Island
Le Petit Vapeur		2008	Mini drop tower	Zamperla	Festival City
Les P'tits Chaudrons		2019	Teacups	Technical Park	Festival City
Melody Road		1988 or earlier	Vintage car ride	Soquet	Festival City
MonORail		2017	Monorail	Soquet	Explorer Adventure
On Air		2015	Magic Bikes	Zamperla	Exotic Island
RépaR’TaKar		2026	Jump Around	Zamperla	Exotic Island
Volt-O-Vent		2016	Barnyard	Zamperla	Explorer Adventure

==== Kids rides ====
Name	Opened	Type	Manufacturer	Area
Balloon Race	2018	Samba Balloon	Zamperla	Festival City
La Chevauchée	1980s	Electric horse riding track	Soquet	Explorer Adventure
Playground Exotic Island 3–6 years	Unknown	Playground	Unknown	Exotic Island
Playground Exotic Island 7–12 years	Unknown	Playground	Unknown	Exotic Island
Playground Explorer Adventure	Unknown	Playground	Unknown	Explorer Adventure
Playground Festival City	Unknown	Playground	Unknown	Festival City
W.A.B. Band Tour	1990	Train ride	Unknown	Explorer Adventure

=== Past rides ===
Name	Opened	Closed	Type	Manufacturer	Notes
Carousel	1992	2014	Merry-go-round	Savage	Moved from Zygofolis. Replaced by the newer Carrousel. Relocated to Family Park in Monts, Centre-Val de Loire.
Cinéma 4D	2011	20??	4D cinema	Unknown	
Grand Huit	1985	1992	Steel roller coaster	Pinfari	
Grand Soleil	1979	2015	Ferris wheel	Unknown	
La Bamba	1979	2018	Calypso	Mack Rides	Replaced by Mystic.
On Air	1985 or earlier	2014	Red Baron	Unknown	Relocated to Parc des Combes as Aeroplane.
Pieuvre des Caraïbes	1992	2003	Octopus	Schwarzkopf	Moved from Zygofolis. Relocated to La Récré des 3 Curés as Pieuvre.
Qwads	1990	2018	Mini quad ride	Joytech	Formerly known as Mini Rallye.
Rivière Canadienne	1979	2005	Log flume	Reverchon Industries	
Stock Cars	1992	2019	Bumper cars	Reverchon Industries	Moved from Zygofolis. Replaced by AirBoat.
Tomahawk	2005	2013	Inverter	Chance Rides	Moved from Walibi Holland.
Turbolift	1985	1993	Tri-Star	HUSS Rides	Moved from Walibi Belgium. Relocated to Walibi Holland.

== See also ==
- Compagnie des Alpes
- Walibi Holland
- Walibi Belgium
