= Anaconda (Walygator Parc) =

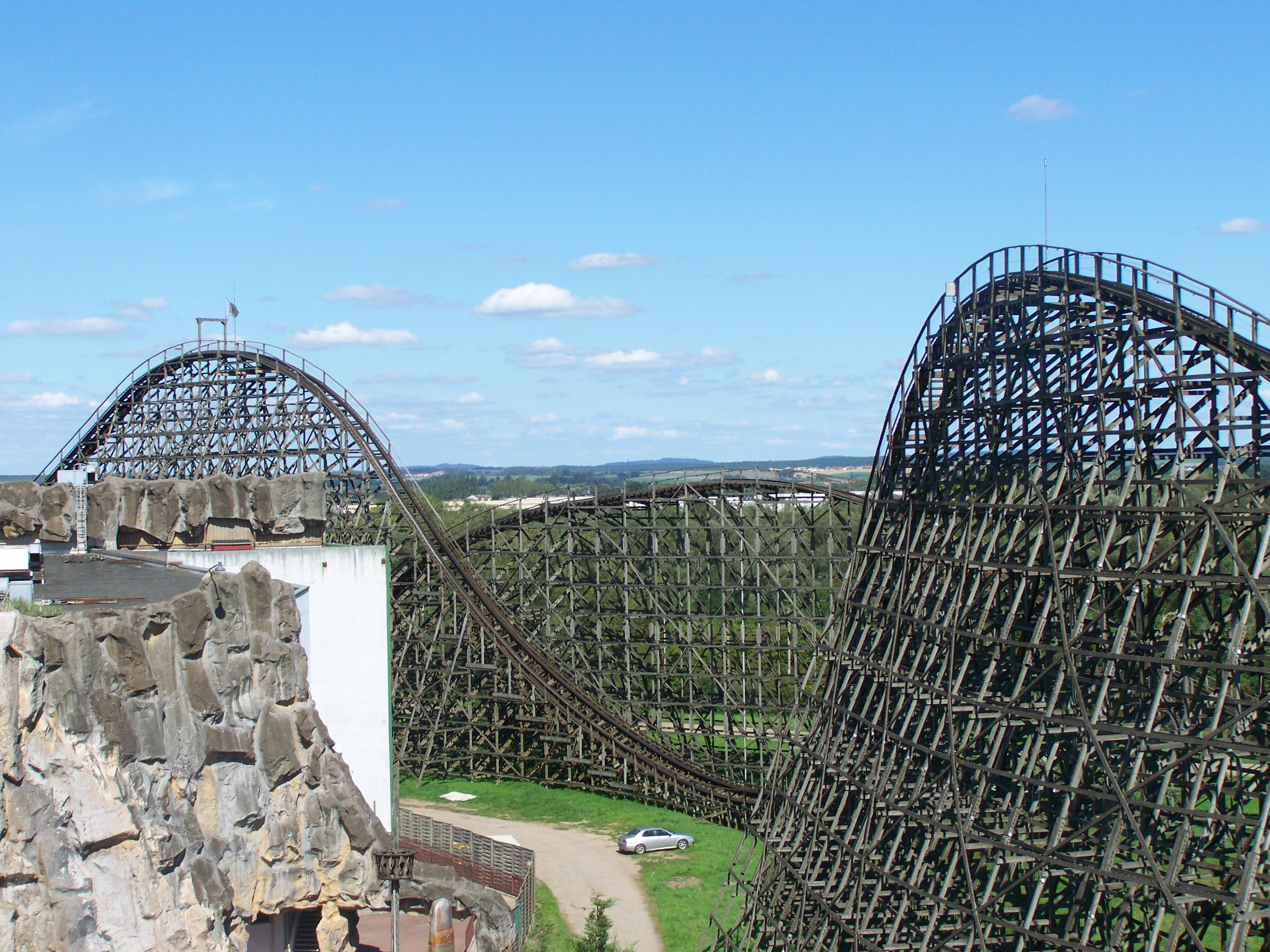

Walygator Parc
- Location: Walygator Parc
- Coordinates: 49°13′39″N 6°09′34″E
- Status: Operating
- Opening date: 1989

General statistics
- Manufacturer: William Cobb (designer)
- Height: 118.1 ft (36.0 m)
- Length: 3,937 ft (1,200 m)
- Inversions: 0
- Duration: 2:10
- Trains: 8 cars. Riders are arranged 2 across in 2 rows for a total of 32 riders per train.
- Anaconda at RCDB

Anaconda is a wooden roller coaster at Walygator Parc that opened in 1989.
