= Expoland =

Defunct amusement park in Japan

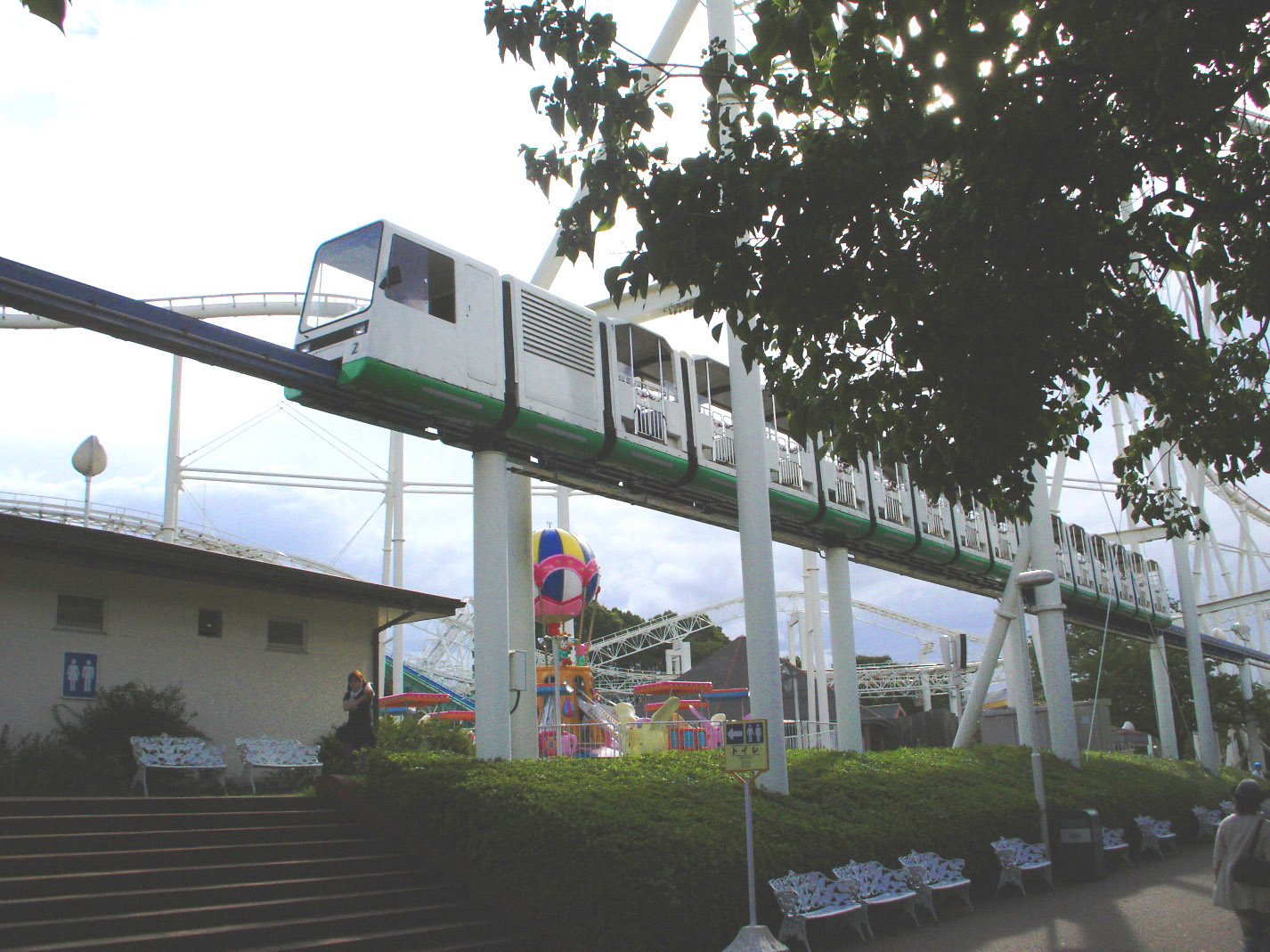
- Senyo VistaLiner of Expoland
- Interactive map of Expoland
- Location: 1-１ Senribanpakukoen, Suita, Osaka Prefecture 565-0826, Japan
- Coordinates: 34°48′20″N 135°32′06″E
- Status: Defunct
- Opened: 28 December 1969
- Closed: 9 February 2009

Expoland, located in Suita, Japan was opened as the amusement zone at the International Exposition in 1970 (Expo '70) in Osaka and thrived for over 30 years as an amusement park. There were more than 40 rides and attractions (including eight roller coasters) and 19 restaurants and shops. The park was permanently closed in 2009.

On May 5, 2007, Fujin Raijin II, the park's TOGO stand-up coaster, derailed, killing Yoshino Kogawara, a 19-year-old university student from Higashiomi, Shiga and injuring an additional nineteen guests riding the coaster, including one serious injury, with all riding guests being sent to the hospital for further treatment. In addition, 15 other guests were treated by the hospital after becoming ill as a result of witnessing the accident. An investigation revealed that the ride derailed due to a broken axle, of which none had been replaced for fifteen years. Following this accident, similar coasters at other Japanese parks were voluntarily shut down and inspected to see if they could also have the same axle flaw. Expoland was cited by authorities for faulty maintenance when similar axle cracks were found on a second train a month later.

The park reopened after the accident but closed again on December 9, 2007, citing a lack of attendance. On February 9, 2009, its owners decided to close the park down permanently.
