= Parc Astérix =

Theme park in France

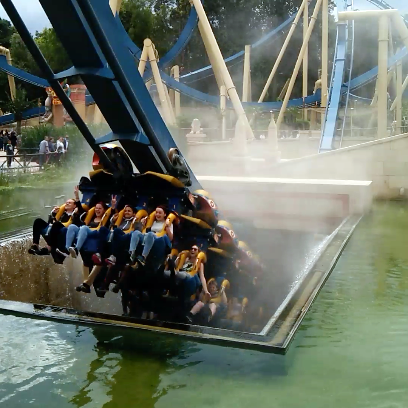
- OzIris, one of the park's coasters
- Interactive map of Parc Astérix
- Location: Plailly, Picardy, France
- Coordinates: 49°08′04″N 02°34′13″E
- Opened: 30 April 1989; 37 years ago
- Owner: Compagnie des Alpes
- Attendance: 2.8 million (2023)
- Area: 83 acres (34 ha)

Attractions
- Total: 44
- Roller coasters: 9
- Water rides: 7
- Website: www.parcasterix.fr/en

Parc Astérix ([paʁk asteʁiks]; lit. 'Asterix Park') is a theme park in northern France based on the comic book series Asterix by Albert Uderzo and René Goscinny. In 2023, the park welcomed over 2.8 million visitors, making it the second most visited entertainment resort nationally behind Disneyland Paris and the eighth most visited in Europe.

It is especially renowned in France for its large variety of roller coasters, which exceeds the amount of most other parks in mainland France. Park Astérix has begun incorporating rides and themes from historic cultures like the Gauls, the Romans, Ancient Greece and recently Ancient Egypt, but always in the visual style of the related comic books, and most usually reusing characters, scenes and sounds from the Asterix media.

The park is located in the commune of Plailly, in the department of Oise, approximately 35 km (22 mi) northeast of Paris, 32 km (20 mi) from Disneyland Paris and 20 km (12 mi) from the historic Château de Chantilly. Opened in 1989, it is operated by Compagnie des Alpes and located right by the A1 autoroute (Paris ↔ Lille ↔ Brussels), having its own highway exit and interchange.

== History ==
=== Conception and inauguration ===
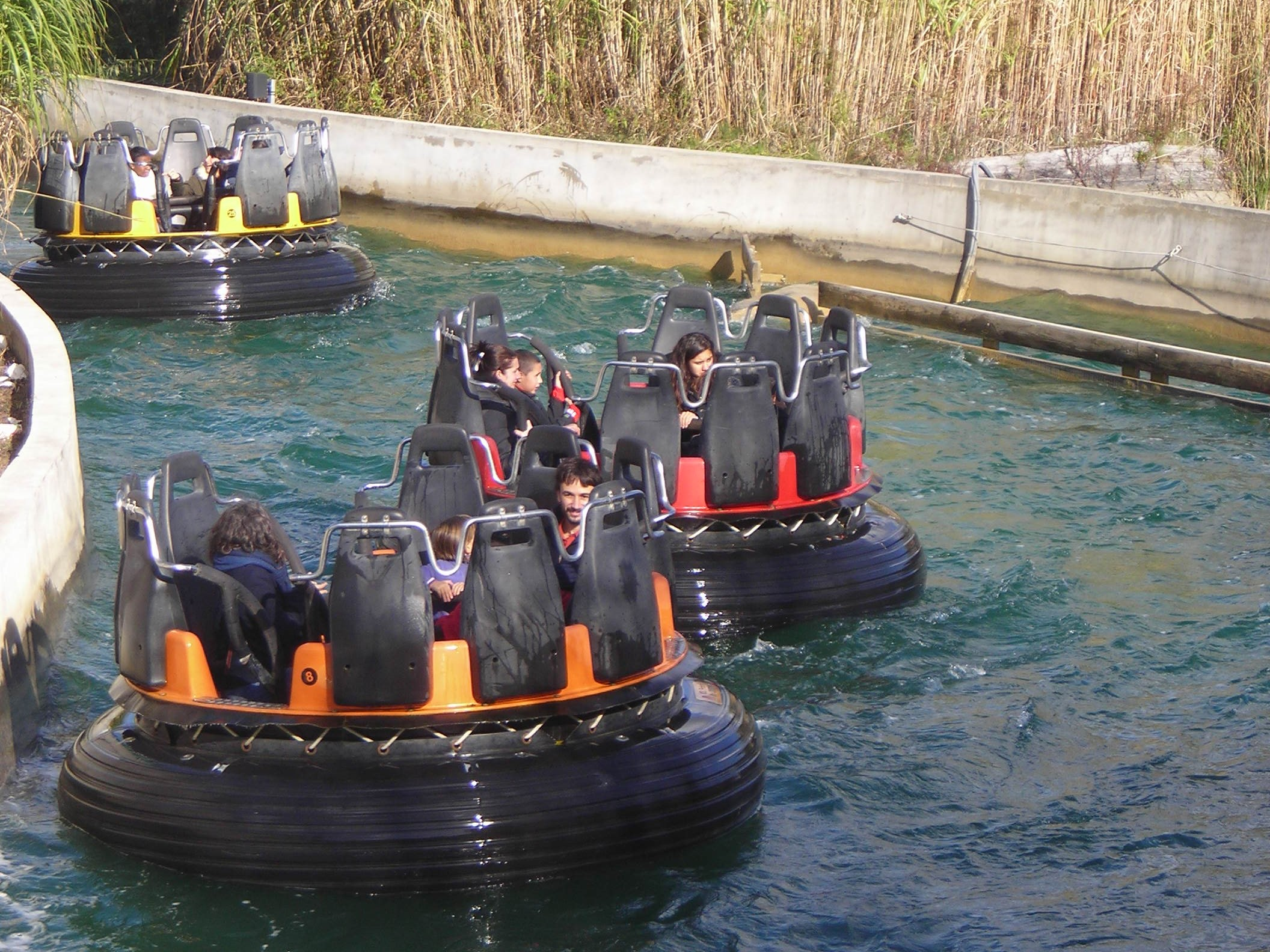
Romus et Rapidus, river rafting ride

Largely funded by the Barclays financial company, with 20 other investors including Compagnie Générale des Eaux, the Havas group, Union des Assurances de Paris and the Picardy region, the park cost 850 million French francs to build and generated 1,200 jobs. The location was chosen due to the transport network: a private interchange connects it with the nearby A1 autoroute and a bus shuttle service connects it with Paris Métro Line 7 at La Courneuve's 8 Mai 1945 station. Jack Lang, then Minister of Culture, inaugurated the park on 30 April 1989 after two years of work.

The opening of Disneyland Paris in 1992 caused Parc Astérix's attendance to fall 30% and its revenue by 19%. However, attendance soon stabilised to around 2 million visitors per year.

=== Recent developments ===
In October 2005, Parc Astérix ran La Fête des Druides ("The Festival of the Druids"), as a way of "thumbing their noses" at Halloween. Season 2007 saw the Parc Astérix opening for the first time during the Christmas holidays. In 2009, for the park's 20th anniversary, it opened during the weekends in September and October and ran a Halloween event called Peur sur le Parc Astérix ("Fear at Parc Astérix"). In May 2018, the park's then Head of Construction, Thomas Dubosc, announced on television the construction of Toutatis, a new multi-launch roller coaster manufactured by Intamin, scheduled to be opened in 2021 yet only opened for season 2023 due to COVID-19 and woodcutting delays. In January 2021, the park announced it was closing its dolphin and sea lion enclosure, the Delphinarium, in order to focus on rides and other shows.

== Attractions ==
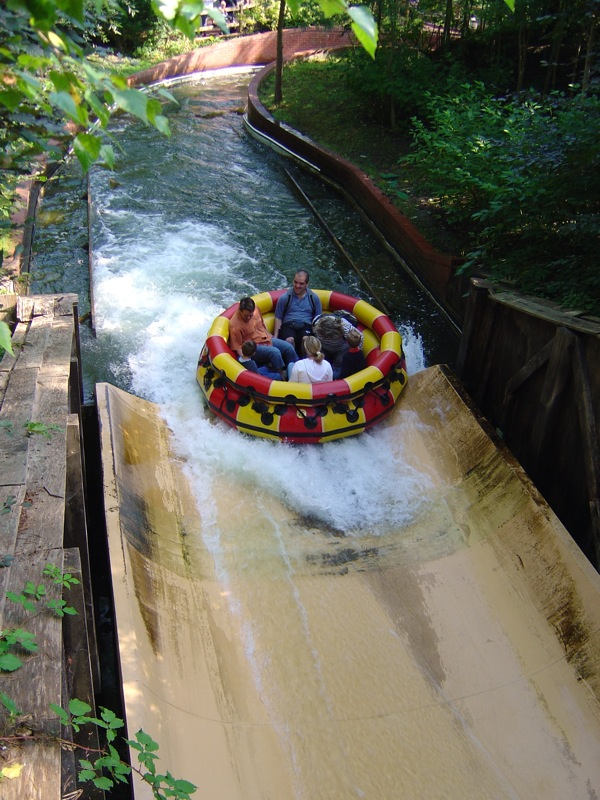
L'Oxygénarium, river rafting ride

The park features many attractions and shows including:

- Tonnerre 2 Zeus, a large wooden roller coaster built by Custom Coasters International (1997);
- Goudurix, a large steel multi-looping coaster, built by Vekoma (1989);
- Trace du Hourra, a 900-metre large bobsled roller coaster with an 60 km/h top speed (2001);
- Romus et Rapidus, a scenic river rapids ride (1989);
- OzIris, an inverted roller coaster, built by Bolliger & Mabillard (2012);
- Attention Menhir, a 4D cinema show (2019);
- La Descente du Nil (previously called L'Oxygénarium), a large twisting water slide with round inflatable dinghies (1999);
- La Galère, a swinging ship ride (1989);
- Menhir Express, a Menhir-themed log flume ride with a 13-metre final drop (1995);
- La Revanche des Pirates (previously Le Grand Splatch), a large capacity Shoot the Chute articulated around the park's feature rock statue(1989);
- Le Défi de César, a Madhouse ride (2008);
- Le Delphinarium, one of the largest dolphin enclosures in Europe;
- Pégase Express, a launched steel roller coaster that reverses the ride direction after a pause halfway through the ride, built by Gerstlauer (2017).
- Toutatis, a launched steel roller coaster with a similar ride direction reversal halfway through (2023), current holder of the "Tallest and fastest roller coaster in France" record, and manufactured by Intamin.
- Cétautomatix, a spinning roller coaster, built by Gerstlauer (2025).

== Economic and Operational Data ==
=== Management and Personnel ===
The park scheduled recruiting around 2,000 people for the 2023 season, which is a record number compared to previous years.

=== Attendance ===
In 2023, Parc Astérix achieved a record yearly attendance of over 2.8 million visitors, the season was marked by the opening of the new roller-coaster Toutatis.

== Incidents ==
- In July 2004, an 11-year-old boy was hit by lightning at the foot of the Trace du Hourra bobsleigh, despite 3 lightning rods located less than 20m from him. The park had continued operating despite weather warnings.
- On 5 July 2006, a 6-year-old Belgian child drowned on the Descente du Styx river rapids ride, sucked in by the water pumps used to create the flow in the bottom of the ride's canal. The ride underwent various security measures; it was renamed to Romus et Rapidus in order to cast off the bad memory and unfortunate implications of the tragic accident. In Greek and Roman mythologies, the Styx is the river of the Underworld that has to be crossed by the dead.

== See also ==
- Incidents at European amusement parks
- List of tourist attractions in Paris
