= Plailly =

- Commune
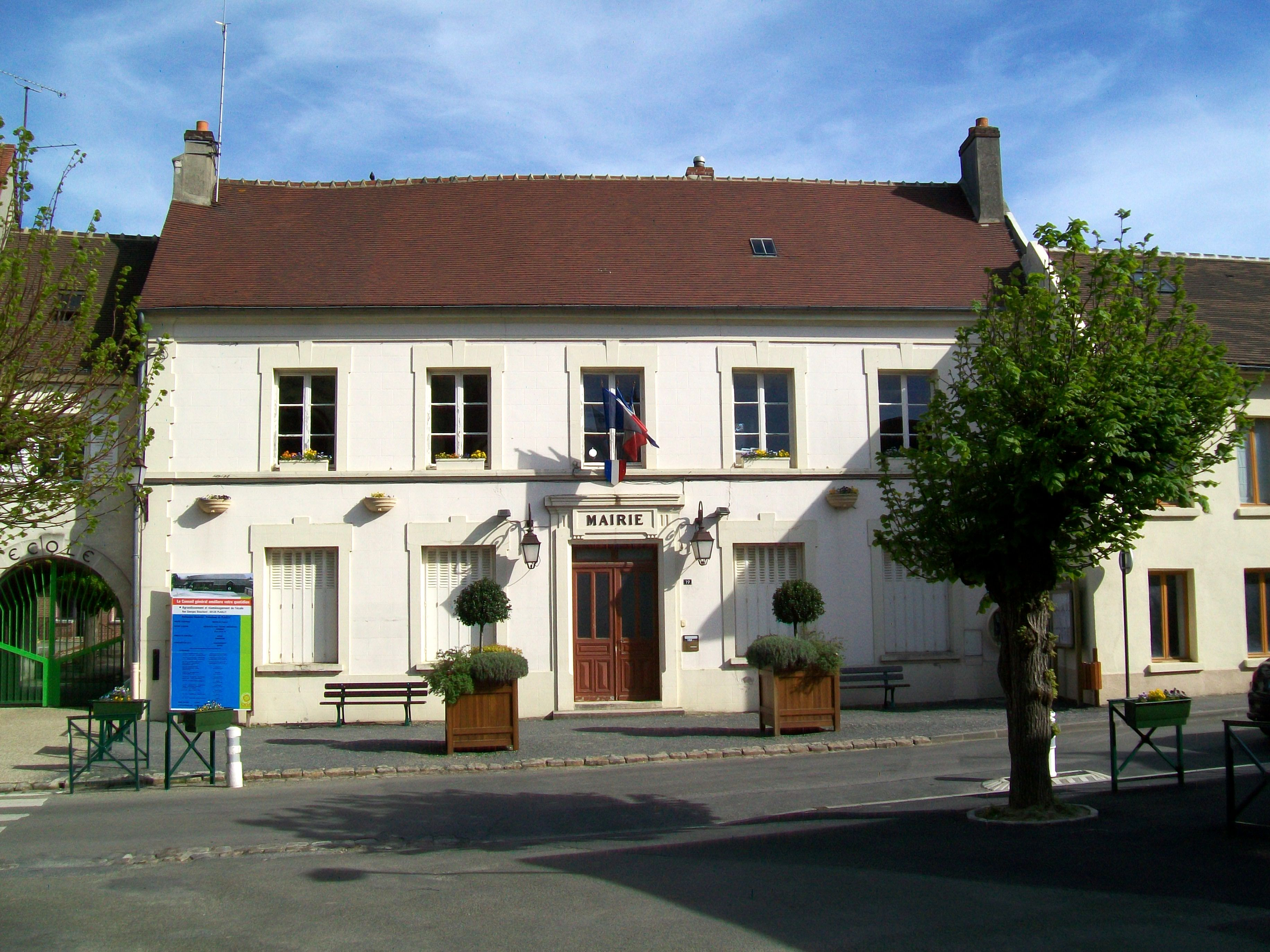
- The old town hall in Plailly

- Coat of arms
- Location of Plailly
- Location within France Location within Hauts-de-France
- Coordinates: 49°06′15″N 2°35′04″E
- Country: France
- Region: Hauts-de-France
- Department: Oise
- Arrondissement: Senlis
- Canton: Senlis

Government
  - Mayor (2020–2026): Michel Mangot
- Area^{1}: 16.25 km^{2} (6.27 sq mi)
- Elevation: 100 m (330 ft)
- Highest elevation: 176 m (577 ft)
- Lowest elevation: 59 m (194 ft)
- Population (2023): 1,786
  - Density: 109.9/km^{2} (284.7/sq mi)
- Time zone: UTC+01:00 (CET)
  - Summer (DST): UTC+02:00 (CEST)
- INSEE/Postal code: 60494 /60128
- ^{1} French Land Register data, which excludes lakes, ponds, glaciers > 1 km^{2} (0.386 sq mi or 247 acres) and river estuaries.

Plailly (French pronunciation: [plaji]) is a commune in the Oise department of northern France. In 2022, the population was 1,791 people.

It is best known as the home of the Parc Astérix theme park, which opened on 30 April 1989.

== See also ==
- Parc Astérix
- Communes of the Oise department
