= Compagnie des Alpes =

French ski resort company

- Type: société anonyme
- Traded as: Euronext Paris: CDA; CAC Small
- ISIN: FR0000053324
- Industry: Leisure, Travel & Tourism industry
- Founded: 26 January 1989
- Headquarters: Boulevard Haussmann, Paris (France)
- Key people: Chairman and CEO: Jean-Pierre Sonois VP Finance and Administration: Jean-Jacques Chapoutot EVP and Director of Finance, Strategy, and Development: Yves Marty
- Revenue: ▲854.0 million Euros (2019)
- Operating income: ▲232.3 million Euros (2019)
- Net income: ▲62.2 million Euros (2019)
- Total assets: ▲1,843.4 million Euros (2019)
- Total equity: ▲928.0 million Euros (2019)
- Number of employees: 5,129
- Website: compagniedesalpes.com

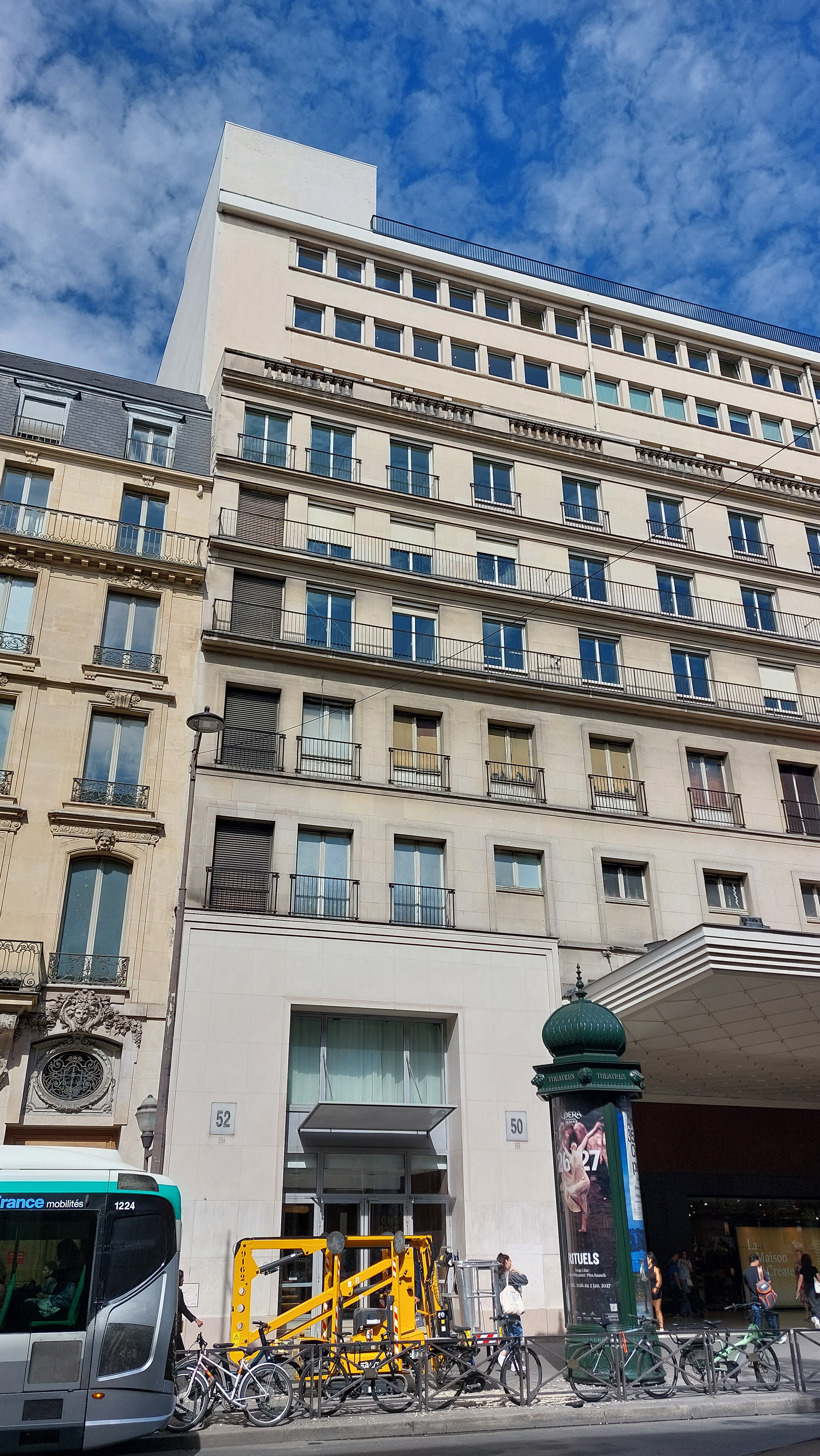
Head office

Compagnie des Alpes (Euronext Paris: CDA ) is a French company created in 1989 to operate many ski resorts in Europe. Compagnie des Alpes is a part of Caisse des dépôts et consignations.

== History ==
Compagnie des Alpes was first established in 1989 as a ski resort operator. Since 2001, Compagnie des Alpes's activity has extended to theme parks including the Walibi parks. The Walibi group was a company specializing in the management of amusement parks. Originally constituted around the Walibi amusement park located in Wavre in Belgium, it quickly developed and Walibi has become the name of several parks in Europe.

The group was bought three times between 1998 and 2006 to end up in the fold of the leisure parks division of Compagnie des Alpes alongside Parc Astérix and the Grévin Museums. The Walibi parks used to be owned by an independent company, run by Belgian Eddy Meeus. They were then sold off to American company Six Flags; however, due to financial problems, they were sold again to Compagnie des Alpes. The company has plans to expand the Walibi brand of theme parks with five of their current locations expected to be converted into Walibi parks.

== Properties ==
=== Ski ===
France

- La Plagne SAP
- Tignes STGM
- Les Arcs ADS
- Les Menuires SEVABEL
- Le Grand Massif GMD (parent); DSG, DSF
- Meribel Alpina
- Peisey-Vallandry ADS
- Chamonix - Compagnie du Mont Blanc
- Serre Chevalier SCV
- Val d'Isère STVI
- La Rosière DSR
- Megève SRMM

Part of the capital share:

- Valmorel DSV
- Avoriaz SERMA
- Saas-Fee 41%
- Verbier Téléverbier 20,3%

=== Parks ===
France

- Parc Astérix
- France Miniature
- Walibi Rhône-Alpes
- Futuroscope
- Jardin d'Acclimatation

Belgium

- Walibi Belgium
- Bellewaerde

Netherlands

- Walibi Holland

Austria

- Familypark

Germany

- Belantis

=== Other attractions ===
France

- Musée Grévin

Canada

- Musée Grévin Montreal

Switzerland

- Chaplin's World by Grévin
