= Vekoma Illusion =

Roller coaster

Revolution
- Previously known as Evolution,(R)evolution, Mount Mara
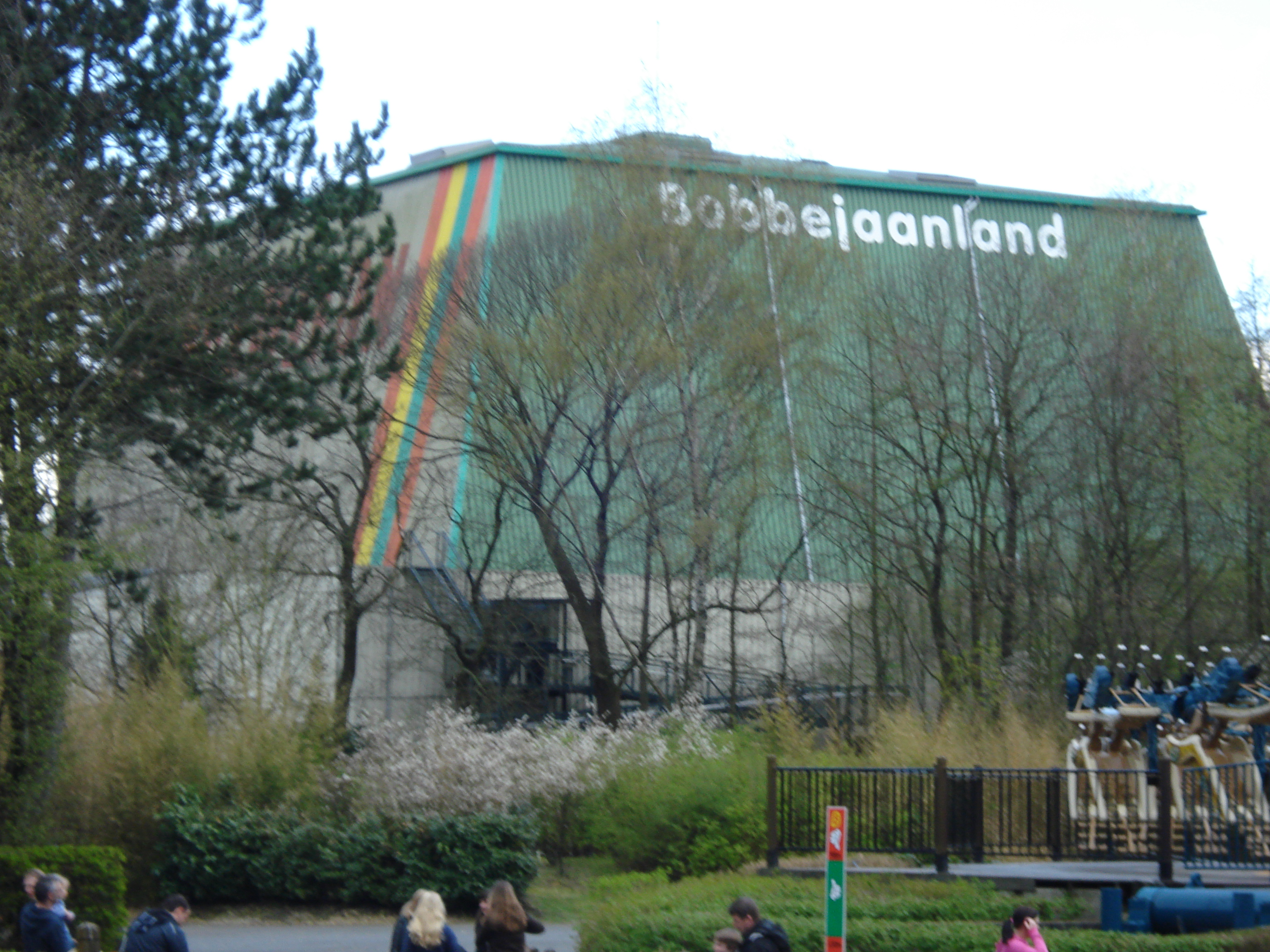

Bobbejaanland
- Location: Bobbejaanland
- Coordinates: 51.1993°N 4.9090°E
- Status: Operating
- Soft opening date: May 1, 1989
- Opening date: June 15, 1989

General statistics
- Type: Steel – Indoor
- Manufacturer: Vekoma
- Model: Illusion
- Height: 28 m (92 ft)
- Length: 765 m (2,510 ft)
- Speed: 50 km/h (31 mph)
- Inversions: 0
- Duration: 140 seconds
- Capacity: 1200 riders per hour
- Height restriction: 100 cm (3 ft 3 in)
- Trains: Single train with 30 cars. Riders are arranged 2 across in a single row for a total of 60 riders per train.
- Revolution at RCDB

The Illusion is a fully enclosed tubular steel roller coaster, manufactured by Vekoma. It runs on Vekoma's narrow MK-700 track system. Two were built, both in 1989: Chaos in Opryland USA (Tennessee), and Revolution in Bobbejaanland (Belgium). Only the one in Bobbejaanland is still active.

== Ride details ==
The illusion runs a single long train, with up to 30 or 40 cars stretching up to 180 feet (55 m) long. Each narrow car carries two people sitting inline, bobsled style. The whole track is built inside and around a dark room, except the base station where people have to take place in the train. The dark room has two major parts: an inner room and an outer room. The train first enters the inner room where the track is a straight up-going helix. Once the train is at top, the track enters the outer room and changes into a bumped down-going helix. In the final part, the track goes back into the inner room where the train is at its top speed of 30 miles per hour (48 km/h). Finally, the track ends at the base station.

In the original ride, the inner room contained two parabolic projection screens: one on the ceiling and one on the floor. The original movie showed a dome with a swinging pendulum, a mysterious clock, a moondial, an eye in the sky, a digital clock, worm holes and explosions. The movies were synchronized in such way that when an event occurred in the upper movie, the outcome was visible in the lower movie. That is, at a certain point, a pendulum falls from the dome on the top screen and shatters the clock on the bottom screen. The outer room contained 35 mm projections of respectively fire, shattering glass, time portals and gear wheels.

== Revolution ==
In Bobbejaanland, Illusion opened in 1989 under the name "Revolution" and has 30 cars per train. In 2008, it was renamed to (R)evolution as the front building of the attraction was redecorated with a jungle theme to fit with the neighbouring jungle themed area "Banana Bos". The film and music were changed a few months later. In 2014, the name was once again changed to Revolution and the jungle theming in the station and queue was removed. The original lower film with the shattering clock and the moondial had already returned in August 2011.

Many of the effects have broken over the years and were either replaced by light effects or simply shut down. In 1999, the upper film with the dome and the pendulum was swapped with the lower film as the bottom screen was removed. Furthermore, a metal floor was placed along with blue light strips and a replica of a volcanic crater.

In 2024, Bobbejaanland invested €1 million in this coaster to restore it as much as possible: the rides station has been upgraded, broken light effects and projections were repaired (except from the bottom projection in the main hall, that one did not return) and the coaster got an upgraded and themed queue.

== Mount Mara ==
As of April 30, 2016, until end of season 2022, the "Revolution" steel roller coaster ride by Vekoma in Bobbejaanland was expanded with Virtual Reality. Originally, Mount Mara was only opened during specific time frames. Later on the first part of the train was for the Mount Mara-ride where passengers wore Samsung Gear VR glasses. The ride was of course on the same coaster but due to the virtual reality, the passengers experienced an escape ride from a bursting volcano. Due to physical limitations, children couldn't wear the VR glasses. Due to technical limitations only 1 passenger per car could wear the glasses. The second part of the train was for the original Revolution ride. Bobbejaanland announced in January 2023 that Mount Mara will not be longer operational due to lack of interest. Mount Mara is since then decommissioned and fully reverted to the original Revolution ride.

Mitch Hawker's Best Roller Coaster Poll: Best steel-Tracked Roller Coaster
| Year | 1999 | 2000 | 2001 | 2002 | 2003 | 2004 | 2005 | 2006 | 2007 | 2008 | 2009 | 2010 | 2011 | 2012 | 2013 |
|---|---|---|---|---|---|---|---|---|---|---|---|---|---|---|---|
| Ranking | – | No poll | – | 131 (tie) | 110 | 124 | 162 | 181 | 204 | 170 | 219 | 185 | No poll | 237 | 221 |

== Chaos ==
In Opryland, the ride opened in 1989, much the same. The two screens showed the same videos as "Revolution" and the smaller screens showed the fire, etc. Sometime around 1990, the lower screen became damaged and the films were stopped. The ride was fitted with laser lighting and the guests wore laser prism glasses. The ride was advertised as "Now more chaotic than ever." In 1993, the ride was rethemed for the park's "Howloween" celebration and was fitted with a nuclear reactor and various smoke spouting aliens, found during the descent. The following year, the alien was replaced with a dragon.

Following Opryland USA's closure in 1997, Chaos, along with three other coasters (Rock n' Roller Coaster, Screamin' Delta Demon and Wabash Cannonball) from the park, would be taken to the Old Indiana Fun Park in Thorntown, Indiana where Premier Parks had plans of reviving the park. However, sometime after Premier Parks acquired Six Flags in 1998, the project was cancelled, and Chaos and the three other roller coasters would sit in storage unused for several years.

Eventually, Six Flags sold the Old Indiana Fun Park to Sunshine Properties in 2002. By 2006, Chaos had been scrapped.

Chaos had 40 cars per train.
