= La Récré Des 3 Curés =

Amusement park in Brittany, France

- Interactive map of La Récré Des 3 Curés
- Location: Milizac, Finistère, France
- Coordinates: 48.472935°N 4.525788°W
- Status: Operating
- Owner: Francis and Jean-Pierre Bonnefoy
- Attendance: 264,000 in 2022
- Area: 17 ha (42 acres)

Attractions
- Total: 38
- Roller coasters: 2
- Water rides: 3
- Website: Official Website

La Récré Des 3 Curés (also known as "La Récré Des Trois Curés") is a 17-hectare (42-acre) amusement park in the commune of Milizac-Guipronvel, Finistère, Brittany, France. The park usually sees around 220,000 visitors every year, making it one of the most popular tourist sites in Brittany.

La Récré Des 3 Curés is situated around a lake, and includes multiple rides, playgrounds, slides, games, 3000 m2 of indoor games, and three roller coasters. In addition, the park includes a 4-star campground.

== History ==
The park's name is derived from that of a local legend, "Lieu-dit des Trois Curés", which tells the story of the park's locations between three communes; Milizac, Bourg-Blanc, and Coat-Méal. The legend says that the resident Priest of each jurisdiction wanted to meet at an inn, but couldn't, as they were unable to leave their parish's territory. To overcome the said obstacle, a triangular table was built at the crossroads between the three municipalities, and each could sit on one side of the table while in the company of the others. During their meetings, they could be served by the local inn.

In the late 1980s, park co-founder Jean-Pierre Bonnefoy worked as a nighttime taxi driver, and had grown tired of the job. In 1989, Jean-Pierre and his brother Francis established a small campground on their family farm, which at the time had only 25 pitches. At first, business was slow. However, in order to attract and keep potential customers, the brothers began to install various games and playground utilities. As attendance increased and the park began to gain a solid reputation among park-goers, a go-kart track was installed, and 2001 saw the addition of Grand Huit, the park's first major roller coaster. The roller coaster was attributed to be the cause towards a 20% increase in park attendance, from 80,000 to 100,000 visitors.

La Récré Des 3 Curés continued to invest in new attractions while maintaining the park and campground. In 2011, the children of the Bonnefoy brothers began to share park management and director duties. The park began to create and run live shows starting in 2017. For the 2019 season, La Récré invested €2.5 million into a brand new reception building, which would contain park offices and ticket sales. The work was carried out by 24 different firms, 22 of whom were from the Finistère region. In recent years, La Récré has also begun implemented thematic areas around the park; Celtic and Mayan culture has since found itself integrated with various attractions. This effort began with Vertika, a major €5 million looping coaster from German manufacturer Gerstlauer, which opened for the park's 30th anniversary in 2020 and represented their largest investment to date. Targeting an annual attendance of 300,000 visitors in 2025, La Récré followed this up with the €1.2 million Valley Of Dinos precinct for 2024, featuring their third permanent roller coaster Jeepo' Dino. Plans were announced in July 2024 to build "Tremor", an 80-metre (260 ft) tall drop tower from Funtime, which opened in 2025 as the third-tallest of its kind in France.

== Attractions ==
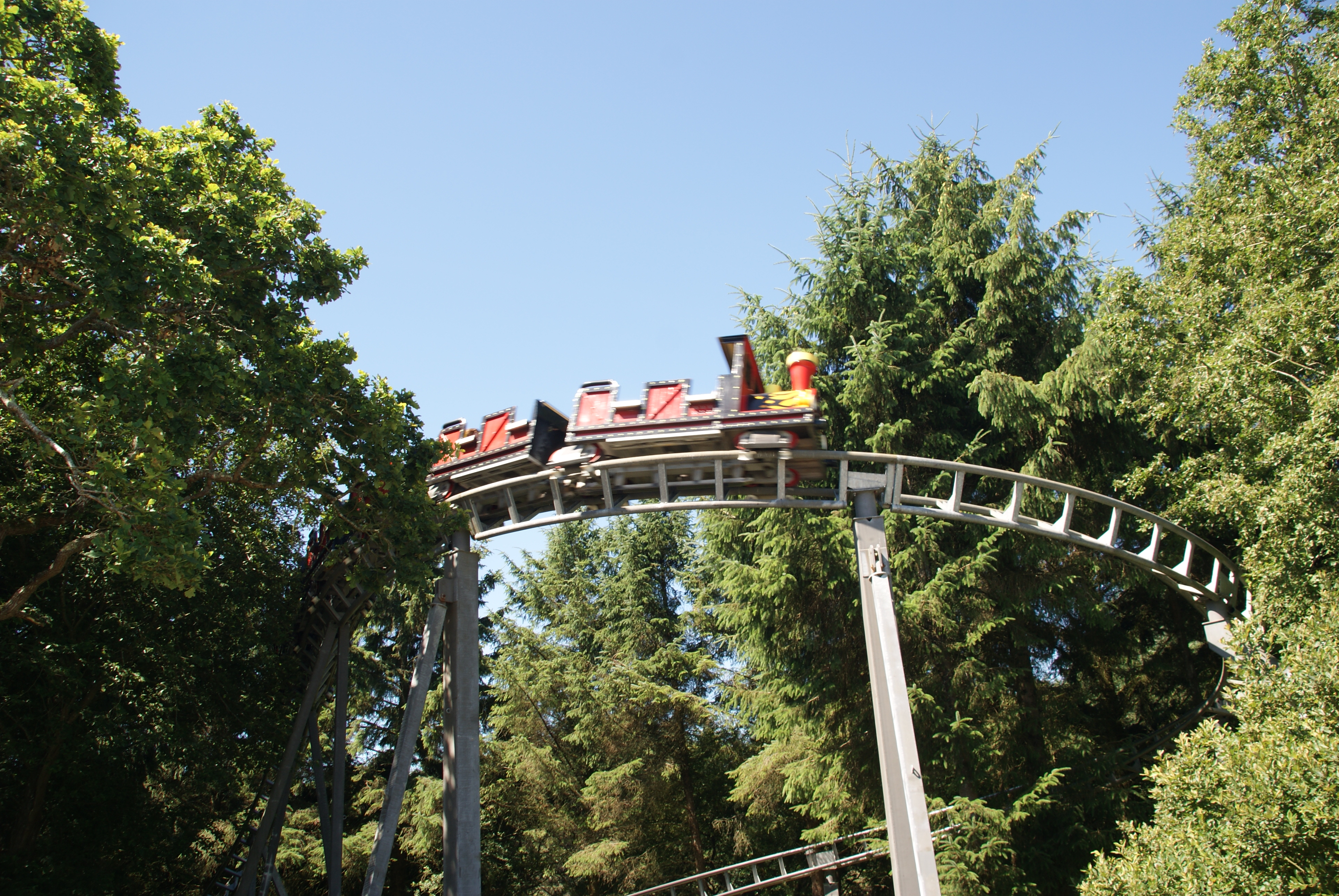
Grand Huit

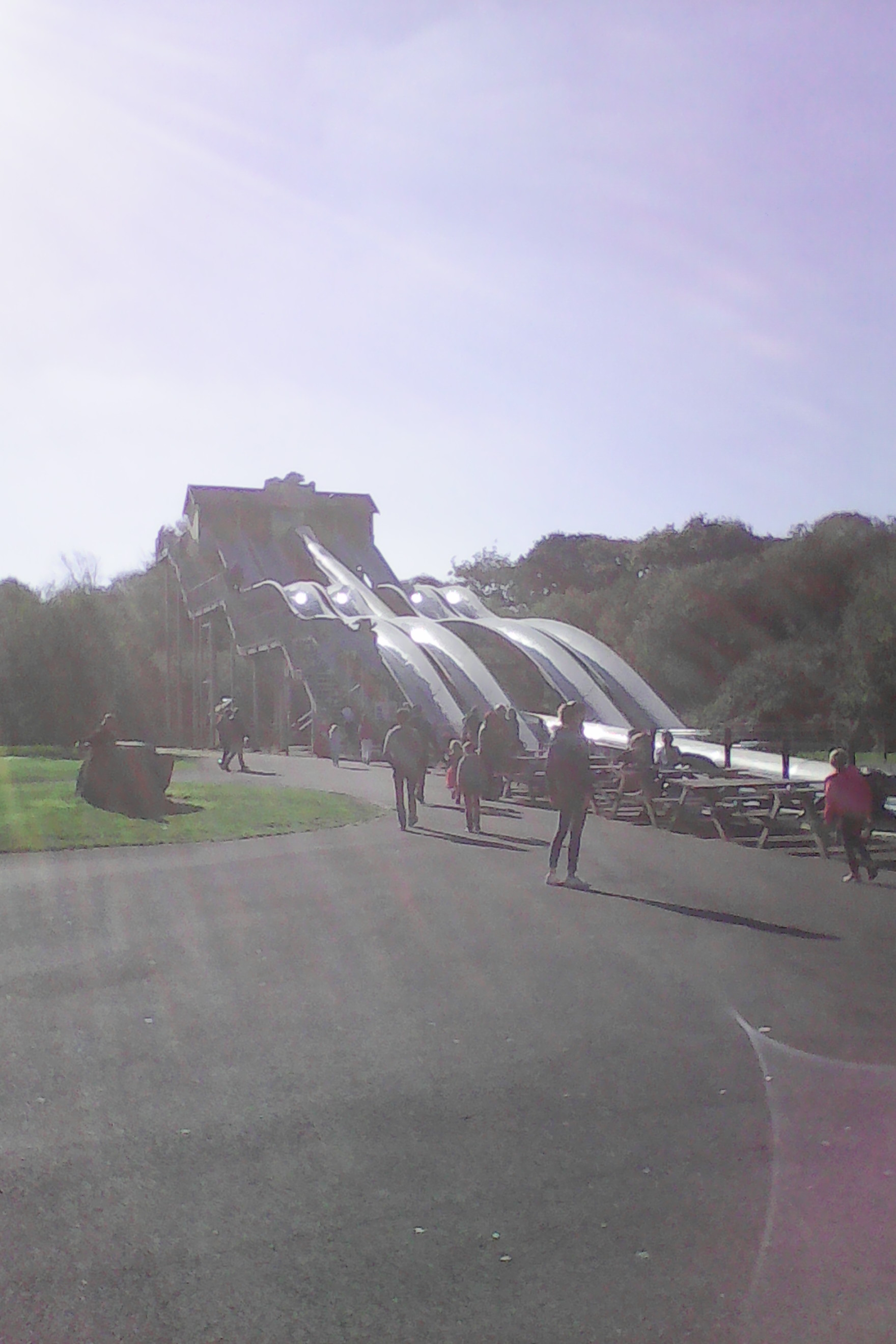
River Splash

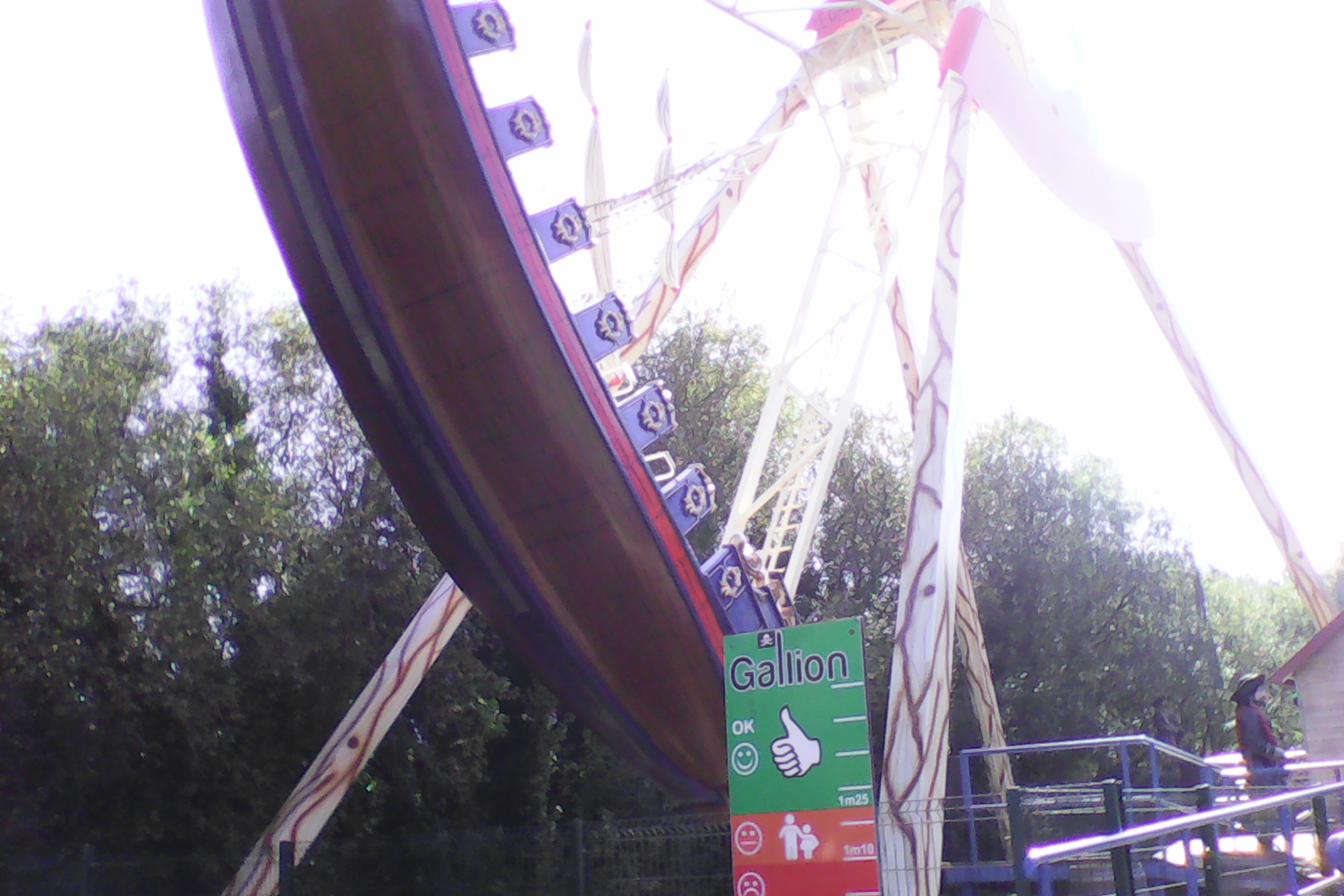
Galion des Pirates

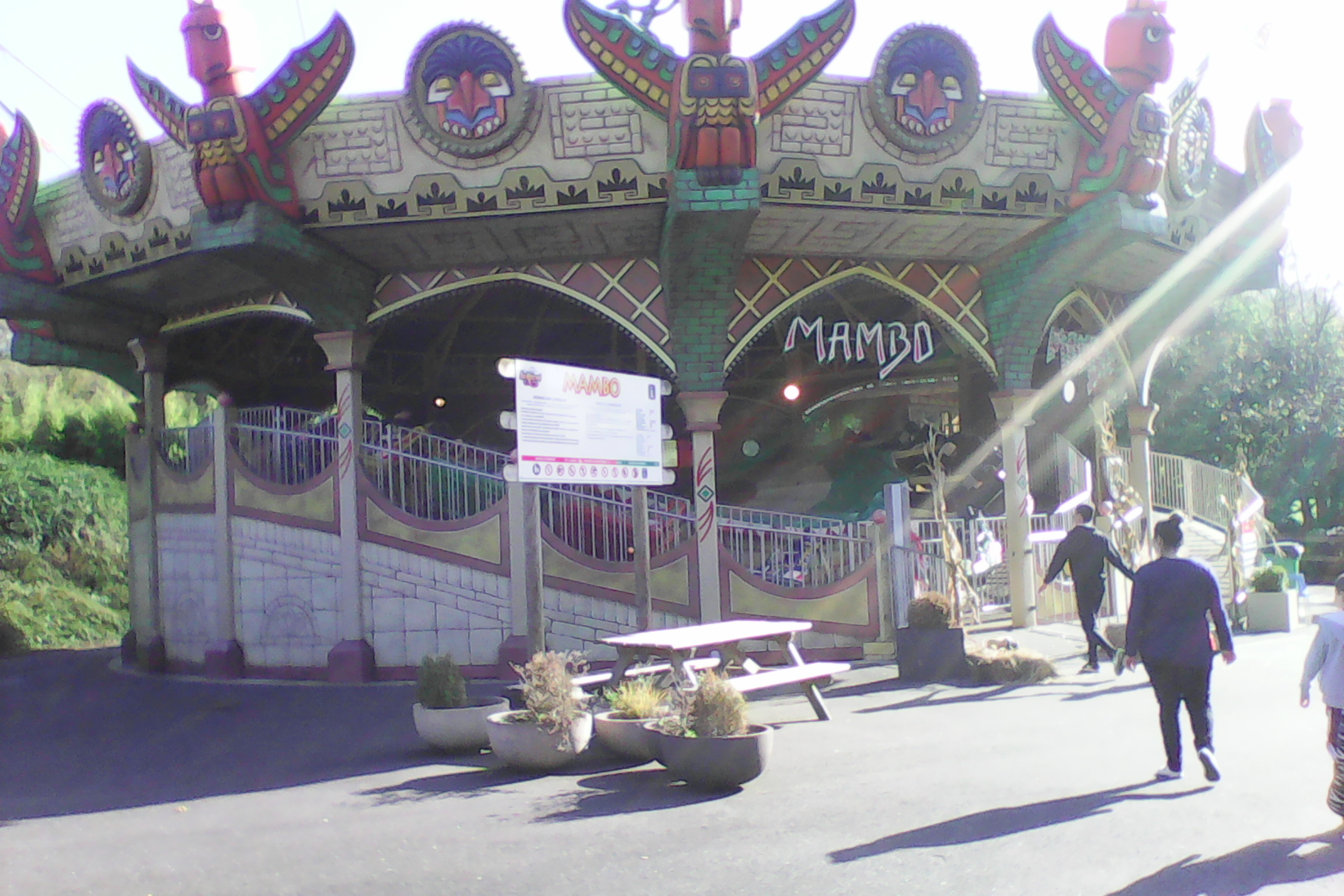
Mambo

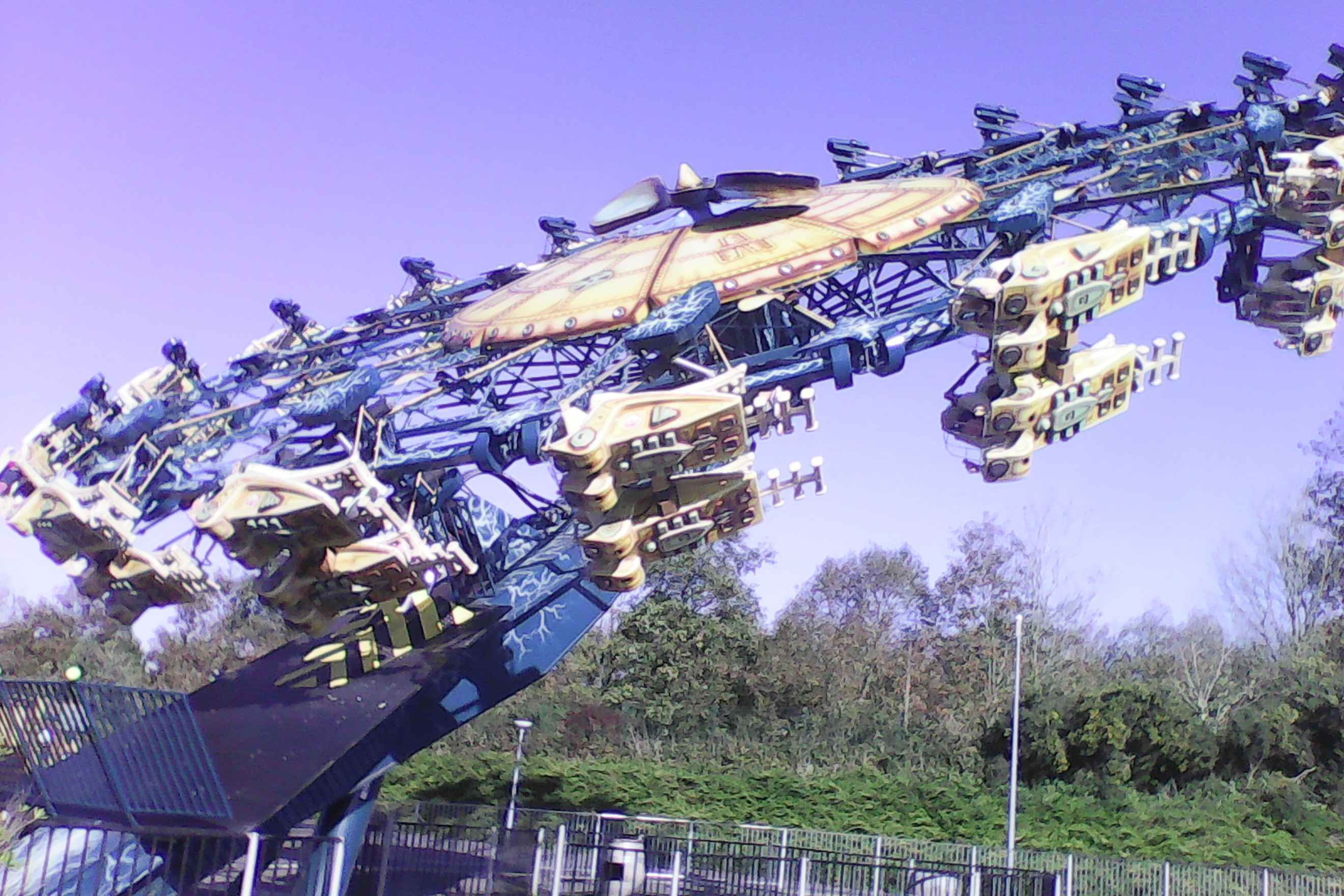
Spoontus

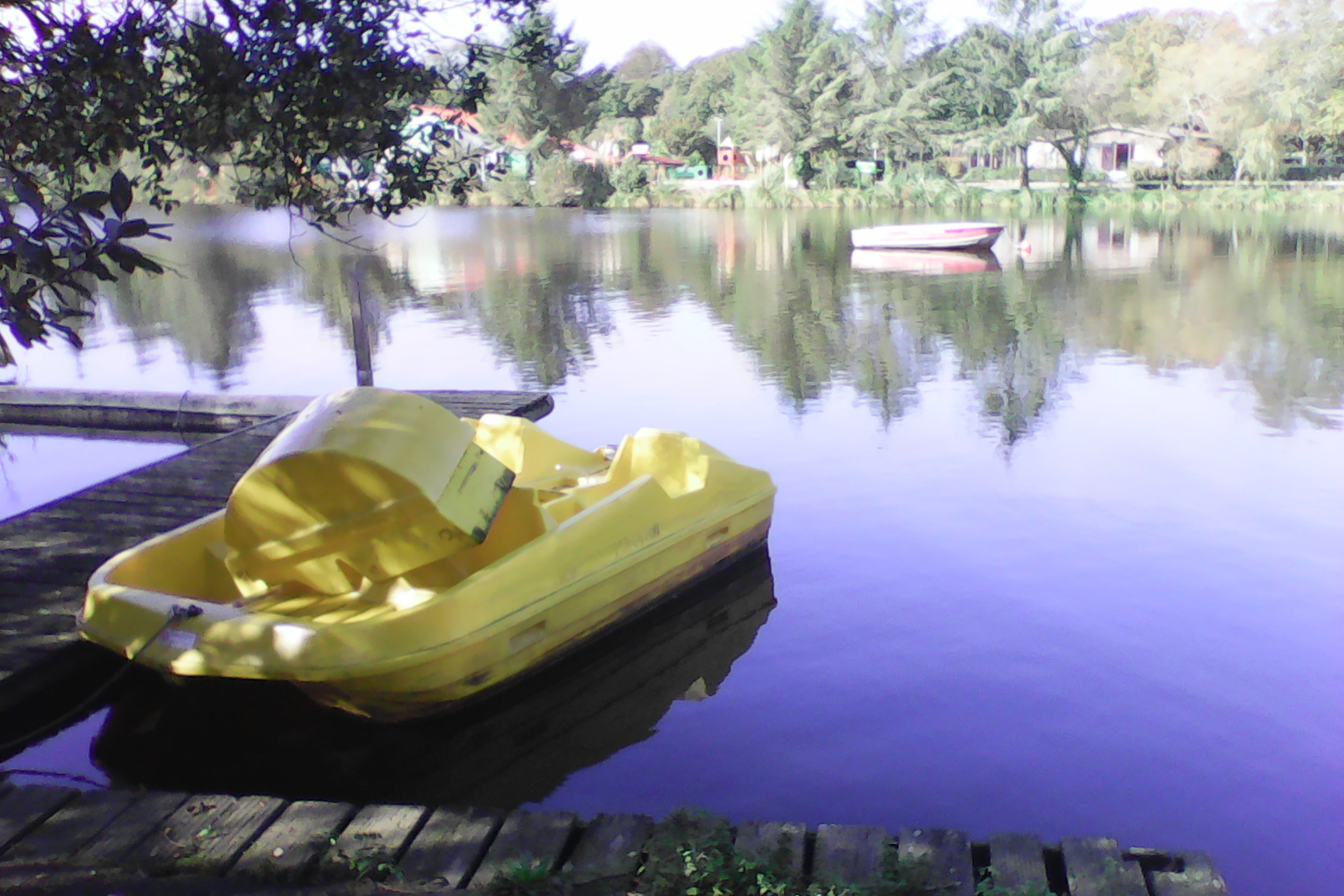
Pédalo

=== Roller coasters ===
Name	Year opened	Manufacturer	Description
Grand Huit	2001	Soquet	A mine train style coaster. For the 2023 season much of the area around the attraction was outfitted with new Mayan decor.
Jeepo' Dino	2024	Zamperla	A junior coaster featuring a helix.
Vertika	2020	Gerstlauer	A Euro-Fighter looping coaster that opened for the 2020 season.

=== Water rides ===
Name	Year opened	Manufacturer	Description
Aquatico	2010	Van Egdom	A children's water play area with slides and a tipping bucket.
Niagara	2009	Metallbau Emmeln	A 194-metre (636 ft) long raft ride that delivers rafts to a peak height of 13 metres (43 ft) and down a chute. It formerly operated as Bobby Drop at Bobbejaanland in Lichtaart, Belgium from 1999 to 2008.
River Splash	Unknown	Metallbau Emmeln	A four-lane dingy slide.

=== Rides ===
Name	Year opened	Manufacturer	Description
Bob's	2004	Wiegand	A 500-metre (1,600 ft) Summer toboggan.
Carrousel		Concept1900 Entertainment	A Carousel manufactured akin to a vintage carousel, and was custom-made domestically.
Chevauchée sauvage		Soquet	A track ride where riders are able to ride atop horses along a rail.
Drakkars	2022	Mack Rides	A spinning boat ride that operated as the Viking at Bobbejaanland from 2004 to 2018, and was replaced by Fury in 2019. Today, it is located next to Vertika.
Galion des Pirates	2005	Metallbau Emmeln	A pirate ship.
Grande Roue	2008	Technical Park	A 25-metre (82 ft) tall Ferris wheel.
Grenouilles	2017	Zamperla	A jump-around children's ride with frog-themed vehicles.
Karting			A Go-kart attraction where riders can drive said vehicles around a track. As of 2021, it is priced at €10 for 7 minutes.
Mambo	2011	Mack Rides	A Mexican-themed Matterhorn flat ride that operated at Bobbejaanland from 2000 to 2010.
Pen Draig	2023	Mack Rides	A Dragon-themed tea cups ride that previously ran as Dino Dancer at Bobbejaanland from 1999 to 2018.
Petit Train			A trolley tram offering half-hour tours around the park.
Pieuvre	2012	Schwarzkopf	An octopus ride. It operated from 1987 to 1991 as Le Monstre at Zygo Park in Nice, France, before opening under the name Pieuvre des Caraïbes at Walibi Rhône-Alpes in 1992. The attraction was closed in 2001, and sat in storage until its refurbishment by Soquet and sale to La Récré Des 3 Curés.
Rêve d'Icare	2015	Zierer	A wave swinger attraction.
Tasses	2008	Technical Park	A Teacups ride.
Tchou Tchou Moutig			A children's ride.
Teufs-Teufs		Metallbau Emmeln	A track ride where riders are able to drive scaled-down tractors along a trail at a leisurely pace.
Tremor	2025	Funtime	A 262-foot (80 m) drop tower.
Manège	2021	Mack Rides	A small spinning children's ride, formerly located at Bobbejaanland.

=== Other attractions ===
- Bassin Pour Enfants; A circular children's wading pool.
- Cannonade; An indoor playground attraction where children can use air cannons to shoot foam balls at one another.
- Ciné 6D; A Motion simulator/theatre attraction showcasing two short movies.
- Jeux Couverts; A variety of indoor playgrounds.
- Labyrinthe; A multi-level playground.
- Le Pitz; Inaugurated in 2023, an "aquatic labyrinth" floor that shoots water jets up at unsuspecting guests.
- Pédalo; Pedalos that can be used on the lake.
- Royaume de Margaux; A colorful outdoor toddler's playground that was installed for the 2014 season.
- Volcan; A cone-shaped slanted climbing structure with a slide at the top.
- Tremor; The third tallest drop tower in France, opened in 2025.

=== Former attractions ===
- Spoontus (2016 - 2023); A fairly rare HUSS Park Attractions Fly Away attraction. It formerly operated as Fly Away at Bobbejaanland from 2003 to 2014. Unlike the typical enterprise ride that the attraction was modeled after, riders instead ride laying on their stomachs, and the attraction reached heights of 22 metres (72 ft) with a diameter of 19 metres (62 ft).
- Super Dragoon (2014-2015); Levent Lunapark wacky worm children's coaster.
