= Dreamcatcher (roller coaster) =

Roller coaster in Bobbejaanland, Belgium

- Previously known as Air Race
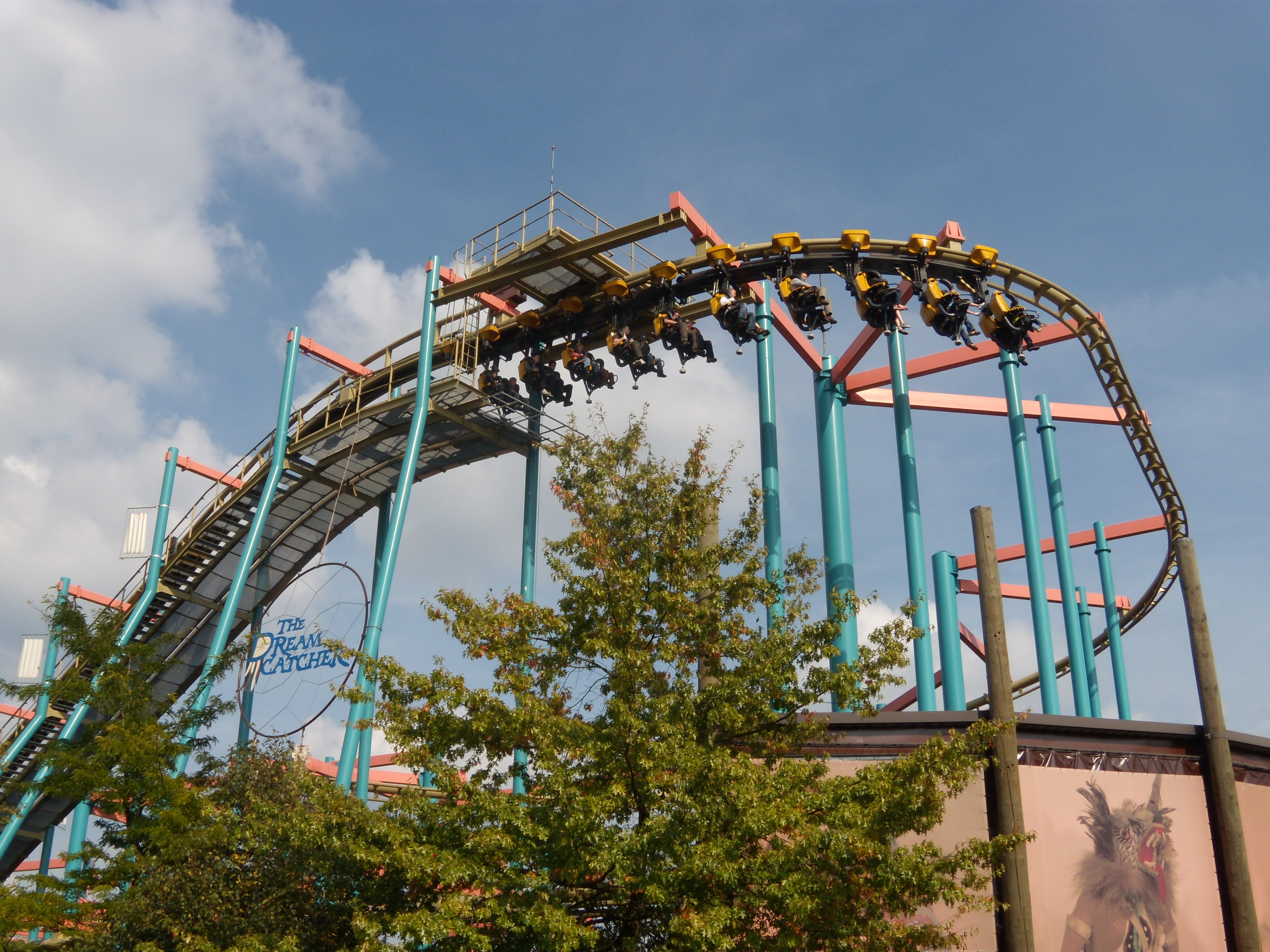

Bobbejaanland
- Location: Bobbejaanland
- Coordinates: 51.1993°N 4.9090°E
- Status: Operating
- Opening date: 1987

General statistics
- Type: Steel – Suspended
- Manufacturer: Vekoma
- Height: 25 m (82 ft)
- Length: 600 m (2,000 ft)
- Inversions: 0
- Height restriction: 120 cm (3 ft 11 in)
- Trains: 2 trains with 6 cars. Riders are arranged 2 across in 2 rows for a total of 24 riders per train.
- Dreamcatcher at RCDB

Dreamcatcher is a roller coaster in Bobbejaanland in Belgium. Originally opening in 1987 as Air Race, Dreamcatcher was designed and built by Vekoma. It was Europe's first suspended roller coaster.

== Ride details ==
The track has a length of 1968 feet. After ascending the lift hill to a height of 82 feet, the track changes into a bending parcour before entering a triple downward helix that turns in a counterclockwise direction. The train exits into another descending helix, this time a double helix that turns in the clockwise direction, followed by the final brake run and return to the station.

In 2019 the ride was expanded with optional virtual reality glasses but these were removed in 2020 due to COVID-19 pandemic and ongoing technical issues.

== Air Race ==
The original roller coaster was called Air Race. The train had 6 little multicolored aeroplanes. In each plane four passengers could sit: 2 in the front row and 2 in the back row. This train was operational between 1987 and 2005. The track itself was painted in bright yellow

== Dreamcatcher ==
In 2006, the theme of the ride was changed to match the style of the main Wild West theme of Bobbejaanland, and the name was changed to Dreamcatcher. The airplanes were replaced by a train which is also used on inverted roller coasters. The tracks were repainted in a reddish-brown rust colour.
