= Kong (roller coaster) =

Inverted roller coaster

- Previously known as Hangman at Opryland USA (1995-1997)
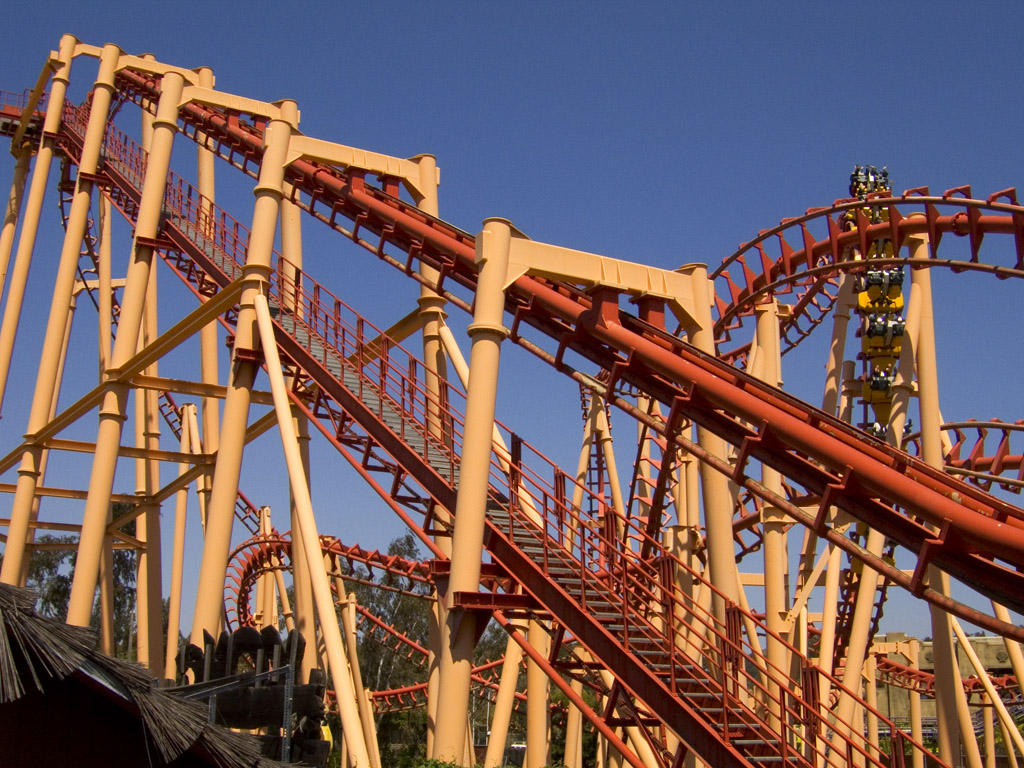

Six Flags Discovery Kingdom
- Park section: Oasis Plaza
- Coordinates: 38.139902°N 122.233785°W
- Status: Operating
- Opening date: May 1998
- Cost: $5,000,000

Opryland USA
- Coordinates: 36.206505°N 86.695676°W
- Status: Removed
- Opening date: May 1, 1995
- Closing date: October 26, 1997

General statistics
- Type: Steel – Inverted
- Manufacturer: Vekoma
- Model: Suspended Looping Coaster (689m Standard)
- Lift/launch system: Chain lift hill
- Height: 115 ft (35 m)
- Drop: 109 ft (33 m)
- Length: 2,260 ft (690 m)
- Speed: 50 mph (80 km/h)
- Inversions: 5
- Duration: 1:36
- Max vertical angle: 71°
- Capacity: 460 riders per hour
- G-force: 2.5
- Height restriction: 52–78 in (132–198 cm)
- Trains: Single train with 10 cars; riders arranged 2 across in a single row for a total of 20 riders per train
- Kong at RCDB

Kong is an inverted roller coaster located at Six Flags Discovery Kingdom amusement park in Vallejo, California. The Suspended Looping Coaster (SLC) model was manufactured by Vekoma and first opened to the public as Hangman at Opryland USA on May 1, 1995. Following Opryland's closure in 1997, the roller coaster was sold to Premier Parks and moved to Six Flags Discovery Kingdom, where it reopened as Kong in May 1998.

== History ==
=== Opryland USA ===
Kong was previously located at the now-defunct Opryland USA theme park in Nashville, Tennessee where it was known as The Hangman. The ride was officially announced on October 8, 1994. Opened on May 1, 1995, it was notably the last major attraction to be added to Opryland before the park closed at the end of the 1997 season.

The Hangman was located in the American West area of the park, in an area formerly occupied by the Tin Lizzies antique car ride. Upon Opryland's closure, The Hangman was disassembled and sold to Premier Parks. Soon afterwards, it was relocated and rebuilt at Six Flags Discovery Kingdom as Kong after Premier Parks acquired the Six Flags chain.

=== Six Flags Discovery Kingdom ===
Kong debuted as the first coaster at The New Marine World Theme Park (later Six Flags Discovery Kingdom) on Memorial Day Weekend of 1998. At that time Kong became the tallest and longest inverted roller coaster in Northern California, missing the speed record by .3 miles per hour (0.48 km/h) and achieving the length record by only 6 inches (15 cm). Today, The Flash: Vertical Velocity and Medusa, hold the height and speed records in Discovery Kingdom and Northern California.

Kong's entrance was previously loaded near the iWerks theater (Also known as the "Dino Sphere"). In 2007, the park moved the attraction's entrance to Oasis Plaza. Guests now walk under the ride to get to the loading platform. As of 2024 the former entrance located by the iWerks theater has been reopened and is primarily used as a accessible entrance.

During Fright Fest 2016, Kong was given a virtual reality (VR) upgrade. The experience would be called Rage of the Gargoyles. Riders had the option to wear Samsung Gear VR headsets, powered by Oculus to create a 360-degree, 3D experience while riding. The illusion was themed to a fighter jet, where riders flew through a futuristic city as co-pilots battling demonic creatures. On February 8, 2017, Six Flags announced that Kong would offer a new VR experience known as The New Revolution Galactic Attack. It was billed as the world's first mixed Virtual Reality Experience powered by Oculus VR. The experience was centered around an alien invasion in space.

2021-Present Six Flags Discovery Kingdom removes the orange train on Kong reducing the hourly capacity to 460 rph. While riding the coaster, you can see the plastic pieces of the orange train under and around the transfer track.

== Ride experience ==
Kong starts with a 115-foot (35 m) lift hill. Followed by that is a 103.5-foot (31.5 m) drop, a rollover, sidewinder, turn and back to back inline twists, before slamming to a stop, or trimming into the brakes.
