= Old Indiana Fun Park =

Former amusement park in Indiana, United States

- The most recent park logo found on a 1995 park brochure
- Interactive map of Old Indiana Fun Park
- Location: Thorntown, Indiana, U.S.
- Coordinates: 40.144764°N 86.536678°W
- Status: Defunct
- Opened: 1983
- Closed: 1996

Old Indiana Fun Park was an amusement park near Thorntown, Indiana, off the I-65 highway. The site is now used for a privately owned hops farm and processing facility.

== Early years (1983–1987) ==
The park first opened in August 1983 under the name "Middle Country Renaissance Festival". It ran for six weekends until the end of the first weekend of October 1983. Construction of a ride park started in 1984, and it opened on June 9, 1985, as "Middle Country USA". More rides were gradually added until 1986, but remained mostly a picnic area and campground with a few attractions. In spring 1987, the park filed Chapter 11 because attendance was not sufficient to meet expenses and further development costs. It opened for that season under bankruptcy court supervision.

== Later years and closure (1988–1997) ==
The park logo found on a 1988 park brochure

On Sunday, August 11, 1996, 4-year-old Emily Hunt was paralyzed from the chest down and her 57-year-old grandmother, Nancy Jones, was killed after a miniature train ride at the Old Indiana Fun Park derailed and overturned as it approached a curve. The two victims were crushed under the weight of the cars. Upon investigation, the train was traveling much faster than its design speed of 12 miles per hour (19 km/h).

The ride attendant claimed to have applied the brakes as the train neared the curve, but it was discovered that many of them were either broken, missing, or not connected, and that most of the anti-derailment devices were missing. The speedometer was broken, along with the governor, which limits the speed of the train. The track was littered with broken ride parts.

The ride passed two state inspections in the 3-month period prior to the accident, before the safety inspector admitted that he was not qualified to inspect amusement rides. A state review of the park's own records showed that the train had derailed 79 times in the 2 months prior to the accident, and as many as 15 times in a single day. The owners of the park admitted negligence, but denied knowing anything about the condition of the ride prior to the accident. They later declared bankruptcy, and most of the rides were auctioned off on February 22, 1997.

== Six Flags years (1997–2002) ==
Premier Parks was planning to redevelop the park and open it in 1999, but after acquiring Six Flags in 1998, the refocused Premier Parks (which had by then adopted the Six Flags name) eventually cancelled the project.

Prior to the project cancellation, the company purchased four roller coasters from the closed Opryland USA in Nashville, Tennessee (Chaos, Rock n' Roller Coaster, Screamin' Delta Demon and Wabash Cannonball), and transported them to the park, planning to reconstruct them there.

During 2000, two more roller coasters from the former Riverside Amusement Park (Black Widow and Little Rickie's Little Twister) in Agawam, Massachusetts (renamed to Six Flags New England in 2000) arrived at the park and were placed in the old parking lot along with the other four and, again, the park sat with no activity.

In July 2002, Six Flags sold the 330-acre (1.3 km^{2}) property to Trevor Gray, former owner of Sunshine Holdings (containing a tanning bed company, ETS, and a lotion company, Australian Gold) and now of Sunshine Properties, which planned to turn it into a nature preserve.

== Sunshine Properties years (2002–2006) ==
Six roller coasters were still on site when Six Flags sold the property. One roller coaster, however, the Rock n' Roller Coaster, would be taken to Six Flags Great Escape in Queensbury, New York and would reopen on June 27, 2003, as Canyon Blaster.

When Six Flags sold the property, it included provisions for them to keep the rides there for a period of four years. This ended on April 1, 2006, and some were still on the site as of that time. By June 11, 2006, all of them were gone.

== See also ==
- Incidents at independent amusement parks
