= Bobbejaanland =

Amusement park in Belgium

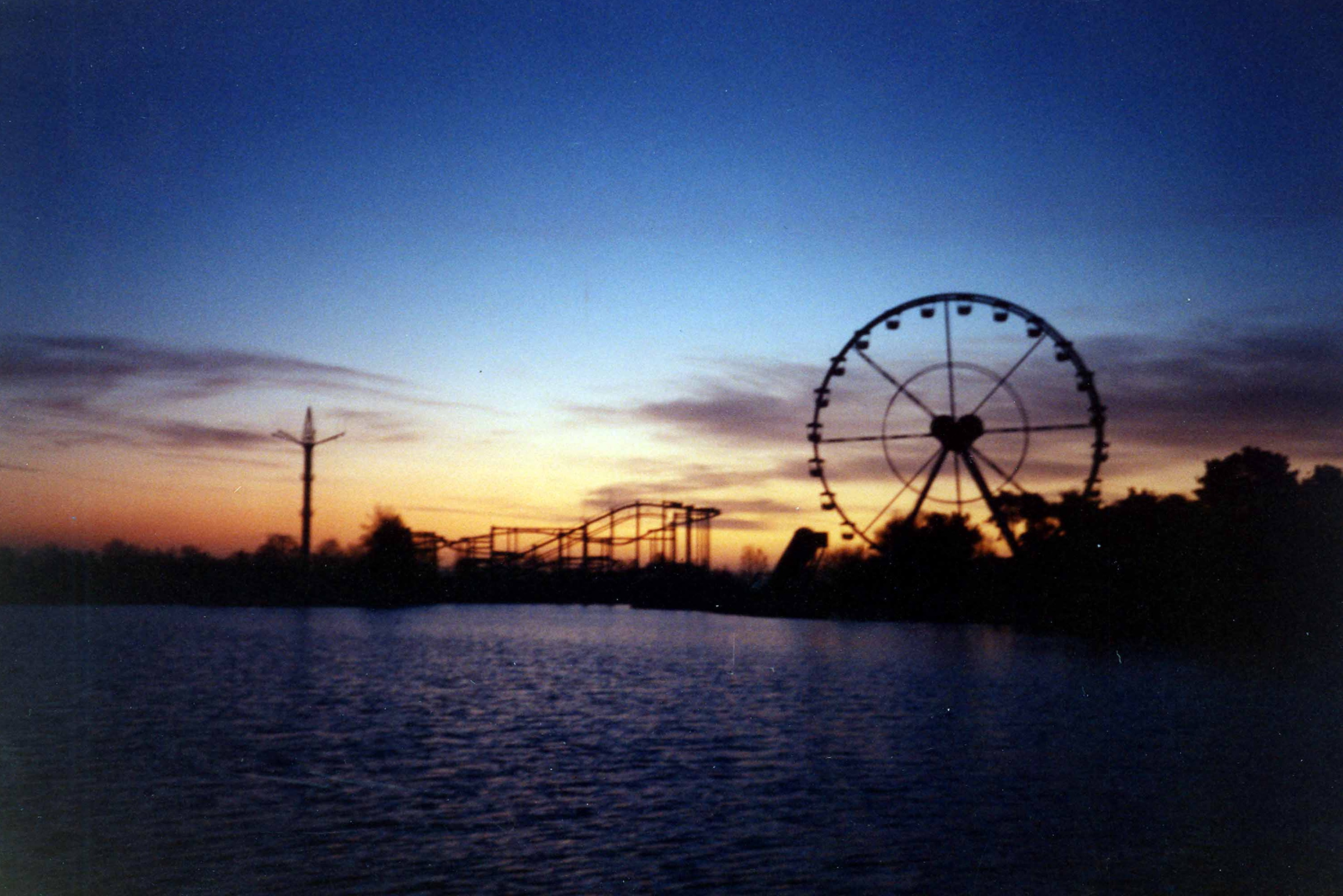
- Morning at Bobbejaanland in 1988.
- Interactive map of Bobbejaanland
- Location: Lichtaart, Belgium
- Coordinates: 51.2010092°N 4.9035258°E
- Opened: 31 December 1961
- Operating season: Year-round
- Website: www.bobbejaanland.be

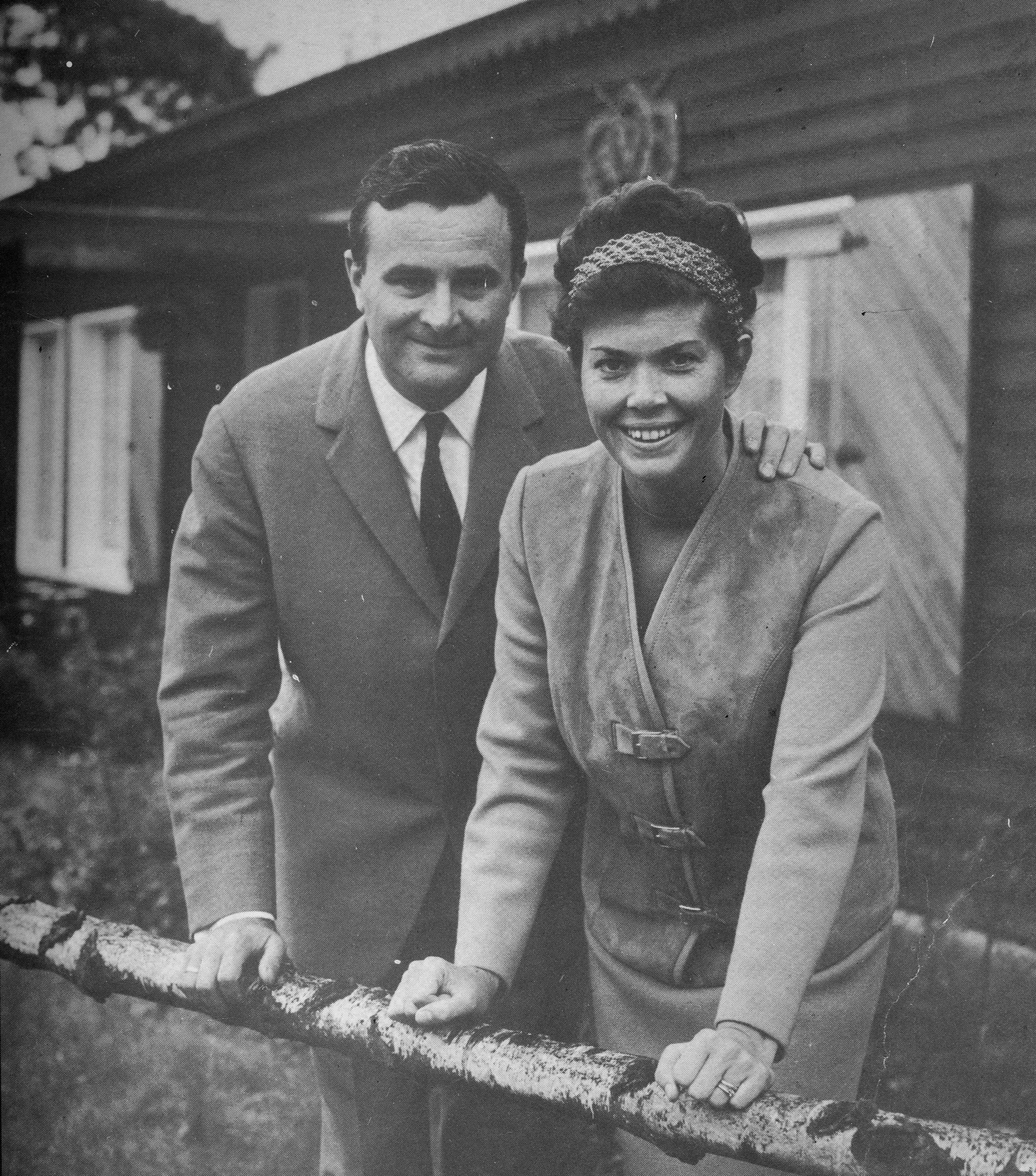
Bobbejaan and Josée Schoepen, ca. 1962.

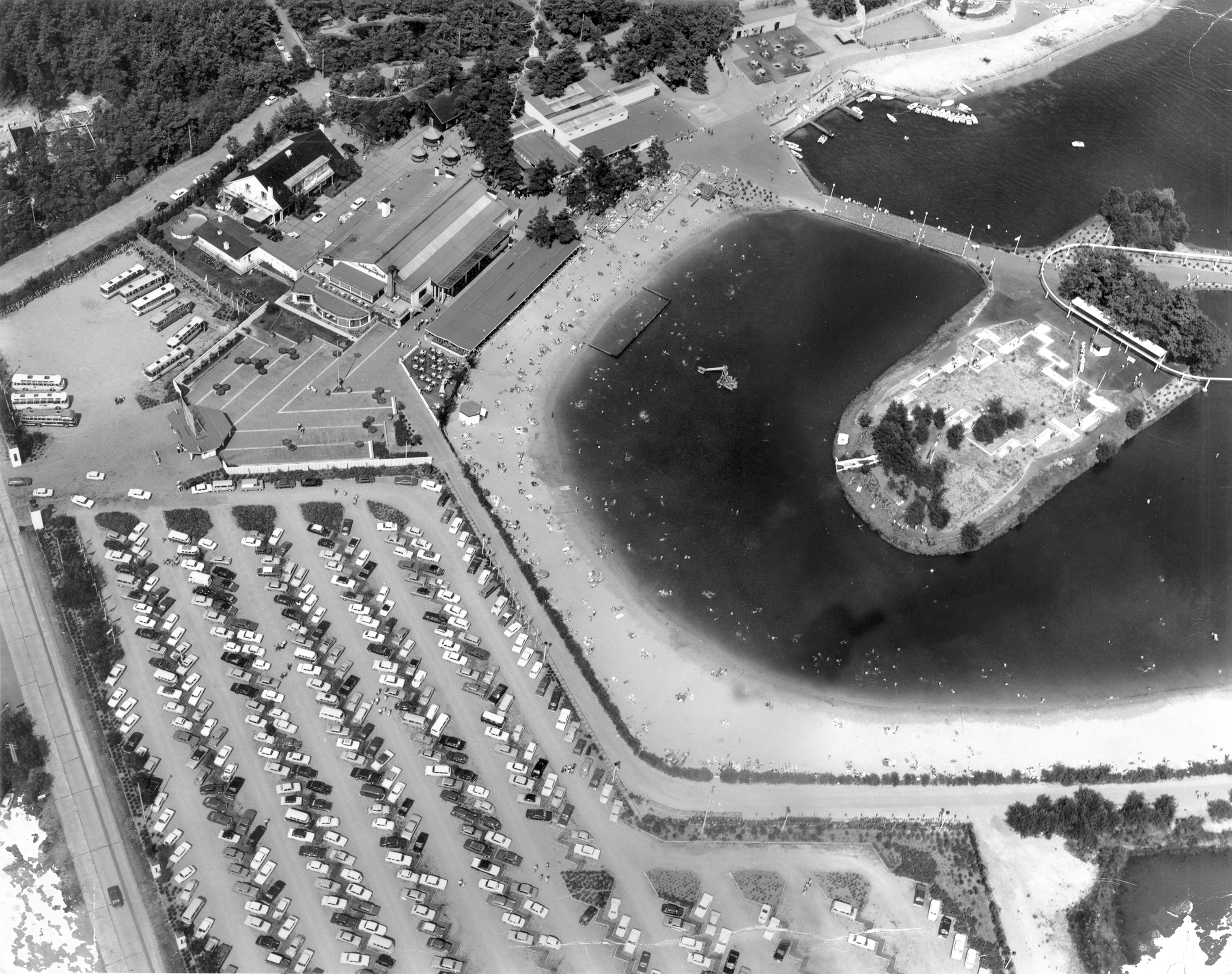
Bobbejaanland, 1973.

Bobbejaanland is a theme park in Lichtaart, Belgium. The park was founded by Bobbejaan Schoepen, a Flemish singer, guitarist, and entertainer who enjoyed international success in the 1950s and early 1960s. In 1959, he bought a 30-hectare (74-acre) marsh, had it drained and built a 1,000-capacity venue that opened in December 1961 as Bobbejaanland. This developed into an amusement park and remained in his possession until he sold it in 2004.

== History ==
=== 1961-2004: Independent amusement park ===
For its first decade after opening the park centered on water attractions and performance spaces. Numerous variety artists from Belgium, the Netherlands and Germany appeared there. Following the advice of Phantasialand owner Gottlieb Löffelhard, Bobbejaanland evolved from 1975 onwards into a theme park, with rides becoming more important than music shows. It grew to fifty attractions with four hundred employees and received visitors from the Benelux countries, France, and Germany. As an independent family concern, it also supported educational and cultural projects. By the end of the seventies, Schoepen's wife Josée (a former opera singer and model) opened a museum with works of art from the Hopi and Navajo cultures, forming an extensive private collection of Native American art.

In 1979, Bobbejaanland opened the Looping Star roller coaster (Schwarzkopf GmbH). Although the ride had a security bar placed over the hip, it was more the centrifugal force which held the passengers in the vehicle when it looped the loop. The coaster was dismantled in 2003. In 1989, the park opened Revolution, an enclosed tubular steel roller coaster manufactured by Vekoma, featuring the world's largest train with 30 cars.

From the 1990s, three of Bobbejaan's five children worked for the park. A 70 metres (230 ft) high wind turbine was added which provided the region with energy, as well as an adjoining museum of alternative energy generation. The windmill was removed in 2017 and moved to Ukraine. In 1995, the Kinderland (English: Children's Land) was opened as an area for young children.

In the winter of 2003, the park invested 12 million dollars (almost 11 million euros) in three new rides, the Gerstlauer Euro-Fighter Typhoon, the Vekoma Junior Coaster Oki Doki and the frisbee Sledge Hammer. In a 2004 survey of 13 European amusement parks by Belgian consumer organisation Test-Aankoop Bobbejaanland was rated second after Phantasialand.

=== Since 2004: Parques Reunidos ===
In the early 2000s, Schoepen was diagnosed with cancer and he sold Bobbejaanland to the Spanish Parques Reunidos group in April 2004. Bobbejaan Schoepen died in May 2010, his widow continued to live near the park until her death in 2013.

In 2016, Revolution was equipped with Samsung Gear VR and renamed Mount Mara. In the morning, the original ride was active. In the afternoon, passengers had the option to wear the virtual glasses. The VR feature was removed in 2023. In 2024, the park invested 1 million euros for a huge refurbishment to commemorate the coaster's 35th anniversary.

== Attractions ==
=== Present attractions ===
==== Roller coasters ====
Name	Opened	Photo	Type	Manufacturer	Area
Dreamcatcher	1987		Suspended roller coaster	Vekoma	Desperado City
Revolution	May 1989		Illusion	Vekoma	Adventure Valley
Speedy Bob	2 July 1998		Wild mouse	Mack Rides	Desperado City
Bob Express	15 June 2000		Powered roller coaster	Mack Rides	Mystery Bay
Oki Doki	3 April 2004		Junior Coaster	Vekoma	Kinderland
Typhoon	10 April 2004		Euro-Fighter	Gerstlauer	Land of Legends
Naga Bay	9 April 2011		Spinning roller coaster	Maurer AG	Adventure Valley
Fury	24 June 2019		Infinity Coaster	Gerstlauer	Land of Legends

==== Water rides ====
Name	Opened	Photo	Type	Manufacturer	Area
Wild Water Slide	1980		Log flume	Intamin	Mystery Bay
Big Bang	1989		Water slides	Aquatic / Van Egdom	Adventure Valley
Bootvaart	1991		Boat ride	Mack Rides	Land of Legends
Terra Magma	1991 (rethemed 2023)		Indoor log flume	Intamin	Mystery Bay
El Rio	2000		River rapids ride	Hafema	Desperado City
Banana Battle	2008		Interactive boat ride	Preston & Barbieri	Adventure Valley

==== Dark rides ====
Name	Opened	Photo	Type	Manufacturer	Area
The El Paso Special	1988		Interactive dark ride	Mack Rides	Mystery Bay

==== Other attractions ====
Name	Opened	Photo	Type	Manufacturer	Area
Aztek Express	1996		Music Express	Mack Rides	Desperado City
Balloon Race	1996		Samba Balloon	Zamperla	Kinderland
Convoy Trucks	2000		Convoy	Zamperla	Wondergarden
Cowboy Playground	2018		Playground	Unknown	Desperado City
Dubbeldek Carrousel	1996		Carousel	Peter Petz	Kinderland
Flying Orca	2002		Red Baron	HUSS Rides	Wondergarden
Glijbaan	1997		Giant Slide	Metallbau Emmeln	Desperado City
Glijbaan Kinderland	1996		Slide	Unknown	Kinderland
Horse Pedalo	1987		Pedal monorail	Metallbau Emmeln	Desperado City
Kettingmolen	1991		Wave Swinger	Zierer	Wondergarden
King Kong	2009		The Giant	HUSS Rides	Adventure Valley
Locomotion	2000		Mini train ride	HUSS Rides	Wondergarden
Mini Rad	1996		Mini ferris wheel	Unknown	Kinderland
Mini Trein	1996		Vintage train ride	Unknown	Kinderland
Monorail	1976		Monorail	Schwarzkopf	Bobbejaan Schoepenplein / Desperado City
Naiads Waters	2019		Water playground	Unknown	Land of Legends
Old Carrousel	1996		Mini carousel	Unknown	Kinderland
Orbiter	1996		Bumper cars	Unknown	Kinderland
Pony Ride	2002		Electric horse riding track	Mack Rides	Desperado City
Reuzenrad	1976		Ferris wheel	Schwarzkopf	Adventure Valley
Rode Baron	1997		Red Baron	Zamperla	Wondergarden
Sledge Hammer	2004		Giant Frisbee	HUSS Rides	Land of Legends
Speeltrein	?		Playground	Unknown	Wondergarden
Wondergarden	2017		Playground	Berliner Seilfabrik	Wondergarden

=== Past attractions ===
==== Roller coasters ====
Name	Opened	Closed	Type	Manufacturer	Notes
Achtbaan	1976	1982	Wildcat	Schwarzkopf	Burned down. Replaced by Wervelwind.
Alpenblitz	1979	1981	Powered roller coaster	Schwarzkopf	
Looping Star	1979	2003	Looping Star	Schwarzkopf	Replaced by Typhoon due to a low capacity.
Speedy Bob (left coaster)	1998	2009	Wild mouse	Mack Rides	Moved to Parque de Atracciones de Madrid as Vértigo.
Wervelwind	1982	1999	Whirlwind	Vekoma	Replaced by Sledgehammer.

==== Other attractions ====
Name	Opened	Closed	Photo	Type	Manufacturer	Notes
Astroliner	1979	Unknown		Simulator ride	Wisdom Rides	
Autoracebaan	19??	Unknown		Go-kart track	Unknown	
Autoscooter	19??	Unknown		Bumper cars	Bufkens	
Balloon Race	1986	1995		Balloon Race	Lutz	
Bobby Drop	1999	2008		Spinning Rapids Ride	Van Egdom	Moved to La Récré des 3 Curés as Niagara. Replaced by Naga Bay.
Breakdance	1987	2007		Breakdance	HUSS Rides	
Bull Riding	1981	2008		Mechanical bull	Reeves Southwest Texas / Anneliese Ketzler	Required an extra fee to be used.
Calypso	19??	Unknown		Calypso	Schwarzkopf	
Condor	1986	1997		Condor	HUSS Rides	Replaced by Fly Away.
Desperado City	2006	2012		Desperados	Alterface	First attraction built after the sale to Parques Reunidos.
Draaiend Huis	1982	1998		Haunted swing	Schwingel	
Elektronisch poppentheater	1979	1994		Electronic puppet show	Heimo	Replaced by Desperado City.
Fly Away	2003	2014		Fly Away	HUSS Rides	Moved to La Récré des 3 Curés as Le Spontuus. Replaced by The Forbidden Caves.
The Forbidden Caves	2015	2023		Immersive tunnel	Holovis	Not open during the 2020 season because of the COVID-19 pandemic.
Funny Barrels	1984	1992		Barrel ride	Metallbau Emmeln	Replaced by Bootvaart.
Indian Art Museum	1978	2006		Native American art collection	/	Parts of the collection were donated to Ghent University.
Jommekesland	1979	1982		Playground / Mechanical bull	Unknown	
Kleine Monorail	1969	1994		Mini monorail	Schwingel	
Koggemolen	1985	2024		Himalaya ride	Mack Rides	
Krokodillenshow	1985	Unknown		Electronic puppet show	Heimo	
Mambo	2000	2010		Feria Swing	Mack Rides	Moved to La Recré des 3 Curés.
Mississippiboot	1985	2008		Steamboat	Scheepswerf Zelzate	
Mystery Hotel	1985	1996		Walkthrough	Sparks	Replaced by Speedy Bob.
Nightmare Motel	2016	2019		Escape room	Del Dracco Entertainment	Required an extra fee to be used.
Oldtimers	1978	1991		Vintage car ride	Gebrüder Ihle	Replaced by El Rio.
Paardjesbaan	1982	2002		Electric horse riding track	Metallbau Emmeln	Replaced by Pony Ride and The Forbidden Caves.
Parachute Tower	1984	1996		Parachute Tower	Vekoma	Moved to a Taiwanese park.
Pen Draig	1994	2018		Teacup spinner	Mack Rides	Formerly known as Dino Ride (2000s-2017) and Dino Dancer (1994-2000s). Moved to La Recré des 3 Curés. Replaced by Naiads Waters.
Pony Express	1976	1996		Bayern Kurve	Schwarzkopf	
Rainbow	1985	2000		Rainbow	HUSS Rides	Replaced by Mambo.
Santa Maria	1979	2007		Shuttle Boat	Schwarzkopf	
Spaceball	1987	1988		Space Probe	Vekoma	Required an extra fee to be used. Removed because of its low capacity.
Spookhuis	1975	1975		Ghost train	Schwarzkopf	
Texastrein	1970	2000		Miniature railway	Mack Rides / Schwingel	Expanded with a Wild West themed tunnel in 1982 and a Time Tunnel in 1985
Trap- en motorbootjes	1962	1990		Pedalos / Motorboats	Unknown	
Trapeze Tower	1986	2005		Playground	Spereco	The wooden posts were used to build the station of Dreamcatcher.
Troika	1982	2005		Troika	HUSS Rides	
Viking	2004	2018		Water carousel	Mack Rides	Moved to La Recré des 3 Curés. Replaced by Naiads Waters.
Zwemvijver	1961	1975		Bathing lake / Theatre	/	Closed because of its increasing unpopularity and several drowning incidents.

== Sources ==
- Bobbejaan Schoepen (Johan Roggen, Publisher Het Volk, 1980 - D/1980/2345/10).
- De Vlaamse kleinkunstbeweging na de Tweede Wereldoorlog - Een historisch overzicht (Peter Notte, Universiteit Gent 1992). 'The Flemish Variety Movement after World War II - An Historical Overview'. Peter Notte, Ghent University, 1992)
- Bobbejaan Schoepen — "Histories" documentary, 4 January 2001 (Canvas/VRT)
- Bobbejaan Schoepen — The Belgian Pop & Rock Archive (Dirk Houbrechts and the Flanders Music Center, 2001).
- "Brel Le flamand" — Histories documentary, 2003 (Canvas/VRT).
- rides.nl
- Bobbejaan Schoepen Archive — Bobbejaan Records bvba
- Official Biography Bobbejaan Schoepen — by Tom Schoepen - "Volkskundige Kroniek" van de Federatie voor Volkskunde in Vlaanderen (i.e. “Folklife Chronicles”, magazine of the Folklife Federation Flanders)- yr. 14 - nr. 2 April-may-juin 2006).
- Bobbejaanland Nostalgie
