= Wabash Cannonball (roller coaster) =

Steel roller coaster

Opryland USA
- Location: Opryland USA
- Park section: State Fair
- Coordinates: 36.208864°N 86.698402°W
- Status: Removed
- Opening date: 1975
- Closing date: 1997

General statistics
- Type: Steel
- Manufacturer: Arrow Development
- Designer: Ron Toomer
- Model: Steel Corkscrew coaster
- Track layout: Custom
- Lift/launch system: Chain lift hill
- Height: 70 ft (21 m)
- Length: 1,250 ft (380 m)
- Speed: 50 mph (80 km/h)
- Inversions: 2
- Duration: 1:10
- Capacity: 480 riders per hour
- Height restriction: 48 in (122 cm)
- Trains: 6 cars; riders arranged 2 across in 2 rows for a total of 24 riders per train
- Wabash Cannonball at RCDB

Wabash Cannonball was a steel roller coaster at the now-defunct Opryland USA theme park in Nashville, Tennessee. Built by Arrow Development in 1975, it was the second roller coaster added to the park following the Timber Topper. Located in the State Fair section of the park, the ride was built in an area previously occupied by the park's buffalo exhibit.

In accordance to Opryland's musical theme, the ride was named after The Wabash Cannonball, an American folk song about a mythical steam locomotive. Wabash Cannonball was one of five roller coasters at Opryland, and for its first 20 years of operation, was the only one with an inversion. Following Opryland's closure in 1997, Wabash Cannonball was disassembled and sold to Premier Parks. After being stored at Old Indiana Fun Park in Thorntown, Indiana for several years, the ride was scrapped in 2003.

== Layout ==
Wabash Cannonball was a stock model roller coaster manufactured by Arrow Dynamics, a clone of Knott's Berry Farm's Corkscrew.

The ride began when the train rolled out of the station into a short U-turn. Following the turn was the 70-foot-tall (21 m) lift hill. Once the train was at the top of the hill, the train dipped down again into a banked turn. The banked turn then took riders down toward the first drop, which gave a sensation of airtime. Following the drop, the train then ascends a small hill and goes down a turn towards the double corkscrew element.

Following the signature double corkscrew element, the train then went through another U-turn into the brake run.
