= Canyon Blaster (Great Escape) =

Roller coaster at Six Flags Great Escape and Hurricane Harbor

- Previously known as Timber Topper at Opryland USA (1972–late 1970s); Rock n' Roller Coaster at Opryland USA (late 1970s–1997)
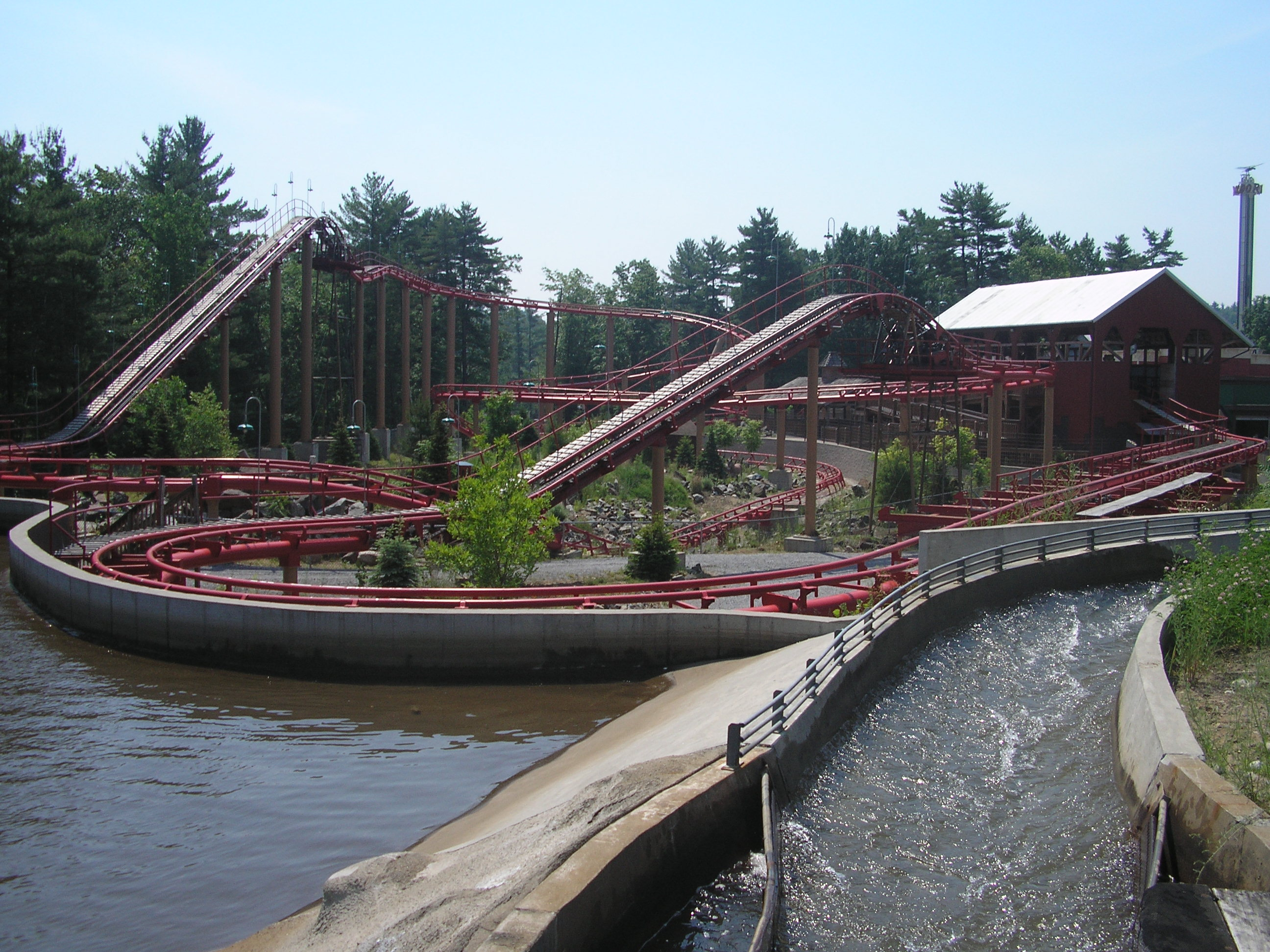
- Loading station, both lift hills with flume of the Desperado Plunge in right foreground.

Great Escape
- Park section: Ghosttown
- Coordinates: 43°21′6.71″N 73°41′29.93″W
- Status: Operating
- Opening date: June 27, 2003

Opryland USA
- Park section: Doo-Wah Diddy City
- Coordinates: 36.208°N 86.695°W
- Status: Removed
- Opening date: 1972
- Closing date: 1997

General statistics
- Type: Steel – Mine Train
- Manufacturer: Arrow Development
- Model: Mine Train
- Lift/launch system: Chain lift hill
- Height: 56 ft (17 m)
- Length: 2,036 ft (621 m)
- Speed: 45 mph (72 km/h)
- Inversions: 0
- Duration: 2 min. 30 sec.
- Height restriction: 42 in (107 cm)
- Fast Lane available
- Canyon Blaster at RCDB

Canyon Blaster is a steel roller coaster located at Great Escape in Queensbury, New York, United States.

== History ==
Canyon Blaster originally opened as Timber Topper at the now-defunct Opryland USA amusement park in Nashville, Tennessee. Manufactured by Arrow Development, the ride opened with the park in 1972 and remained its only full-size coaster until Wabash Cannonball opened in 1975. It had a rustic mine train theme. In the late 1970s, the coaster was renamed Rock n' Roller Coaster when its area within the park was rethemed to "Doo-Wah Diddy City", paying homage to the doo-wop music of the 1950s. As part of the retheming, its trains and buildings associated with the ride were repainted in bright pastel colors.

After Opryland USA closed in 1997, the coaster was disassembled and sold to Premier Parks. After being stored at Old Indiana Fun Park in Thorntown, Indiana for several years, the ride was relocated to The Great Escape Fun Park in Queensbury, New York and renamed Canyon Blaster in 2003.

On May 30, 2013, The Great Escape Fun Park announced that Canyon Blaster would be running backwards during the 2013 season.
