= Fury (roller coaster) =

Launched roller coaster at Bobbejaanland

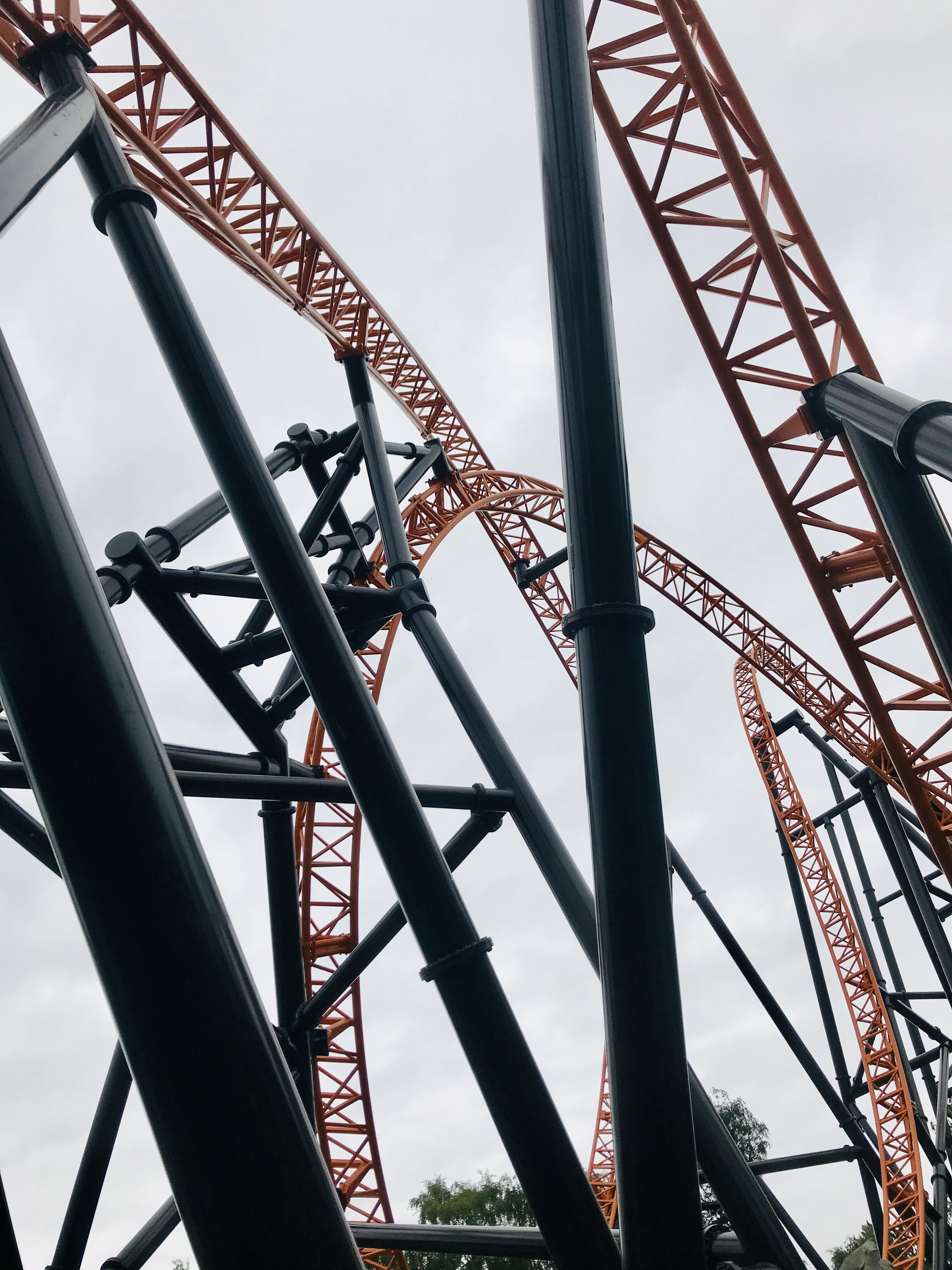

Bobbejaanland
- Location: Bobbejaanland
- Coordinates: 51.1993°N 4.9090°E
- Status: Operating
- Soft opening date: June 22, 2019
- Opening date: June 24, 2019

General statistics
- Type: Steel – Launched
- Manufacturer: Gerstlauer
- Model: Infinity Coaster
- Lift/launch system: LSM launch
- Height: 43 m (141 ft)
- Drop: 41.9 m (137 ft)
- Length: 600 m (2,000 ft)
- Speed: 106.6 km/h (66.2 mph)
- Inversions: 2
- Max vertical angle: 90°
- Height restriction: 130 cm (4 ft 3 in)
- Trains: 2 trains with a single car. Riders are arranged 4 across in 3 rows for a total of 12 riders per train.
- Fury at RCDB

Fury is a triple launched roller coaster in the Belgian amusement park Bobbejaanland. It opened on June 24, 2019. It is the 2nd fastest roller coaster inside Benelux with a maximum speed of 106.6 kilometers per hour. Before the ride, passengers can choose with a voting system whether the ride will be done in the forward or backward direction.

== History ==
On February 27, 2018, Bobbejaanland announced that they would be adding their next roller coaster. It would be set to open in 2019 as part of a 5-acre (2.0 ha) expansion. By September of that year, the ride's blueprints were leaked and the space was cleared. It was then confirmed that the attraction would be a Gerstlauer triple launch coaster.

In February 2019, Bobbejaanland announced that the ride would be named Fury. It was also announced that the ride would be part of a new themed area named Land of Legends.

Fury opened to the public on June 24, 2019. An opening ceremony and a passholder's preview were held on the 22nd respectively.

== Ride experience ==
The highest point of Fury is 43 meters and the track is 600 meters long, but the total distance during the ride is 830 meters. When opened, it was the fastest roller coaster inside the Benelux, at 106.6 kilometers per hour. The record is now held by Kondaa. The track is not contiguous and can be done in forward or backward direction. In the base station, the train rides to a start platform. Depending on the vote of the passengers the ride will be done in forward/backward direction the platform turns 90 degrees to the left or to the right.

=== Forward ===
In the assumption the train goes in the forward direction. The train is launched forwards and stops approximately in the middle of the first slope. It then goes backwards and speeds up before exceeding a first junior scorpion tail. Next it goes down and will now have speed enough the go over the top hat. This followed by a wraparound corkscrew and a Finnish loop. The train goes up another junior scorpion tail and thens roll back to the end platform. The end platform turns 90 degrees and the train heads back into the base station.

=== Backward ===
In the assumption the train goes in the backward direction. The train is launched backwards and stops approximately in the middle of the first slope. It then goes forwards and speeds up before exceeding the first junior scorpion tail. Next it goes down and will now have speed enough the go over the top hat. This followed by a wraparound corkscrew and a Finnish loop. The train goes up another junior scorpion tail and then rolls back to the end platform. The end platform turns 90 degrees and the train heads back into the base station.
