= Desperados (ride) =

Collective amusement ride developed by Alterface

Desperados is a collective amusement ride developed by Alterface. It presents itself as an interactive theater with a Western theme.

10 to 60 riders step on their individual horses and pick up their six-shooters. All riders play together on the same large video screen but everyone receives an individual score and every horse moves differently according to how good its rider plays. Both the best and worst riders are acknowledged by the system via Doc, the 3D character animating the show.

== Parks with Desperado attractions ==
- Happy Valley Shanghai - China
- Rusutsu Resort - Japan
- Bakken - Denmark
- Bobbejaanland - Belgium (removed 2012)
- Fraispertuis City - France
- Liseberg - Sweden
