= Océade =

Former water park in Brussels, Belgium

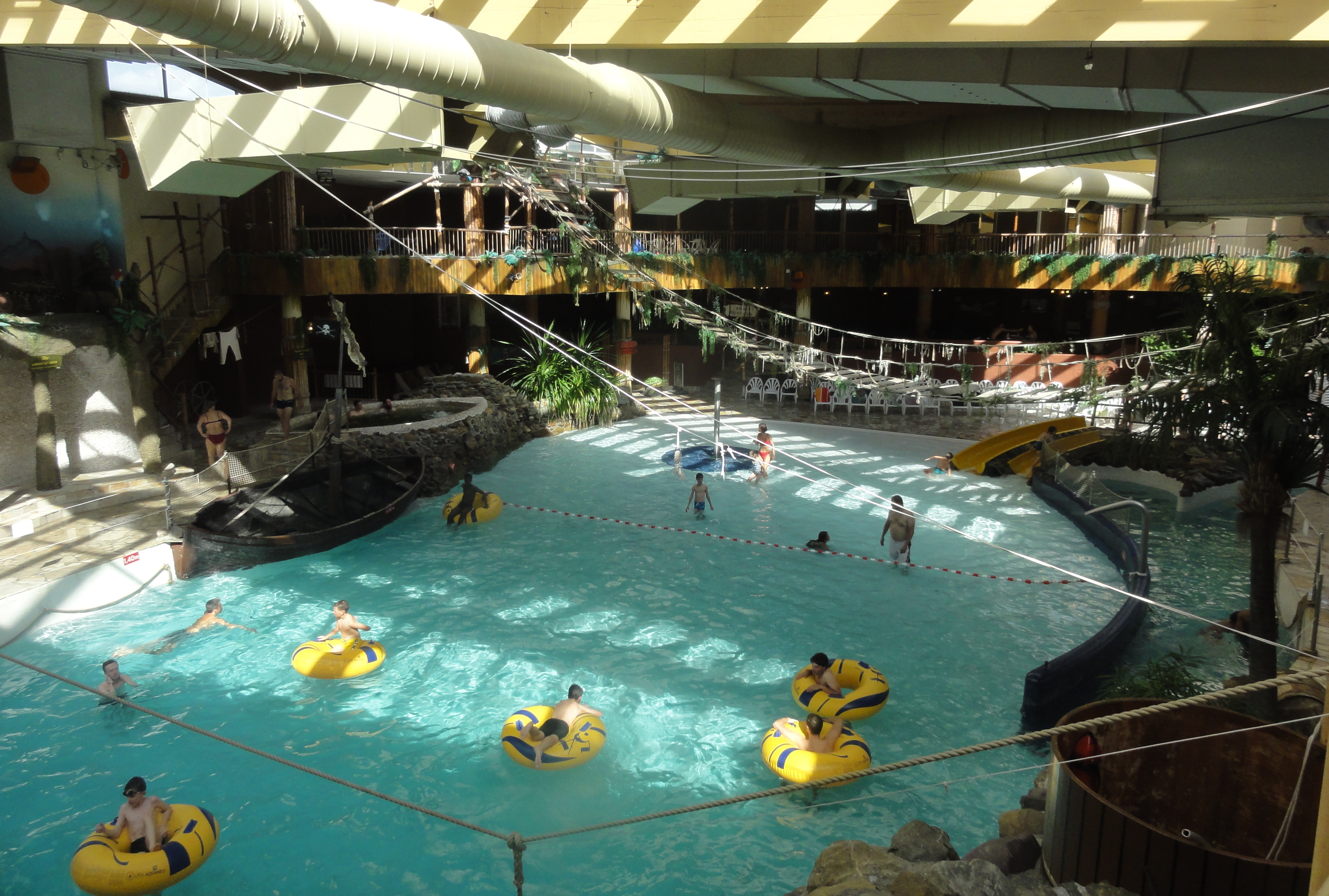
- The park, a few days before its closure
- Interactive map of Océade
- Location: Brussels, Belgium
- Coordinates: 50°53′40″N 4°20′13″E
- Status: Defunct
- Opened: 1988
- Closed: 2018
- Operated by: Walibi Belgium
- Theme: Tropical

Océade was an indoor waterpark in the north-west of Brussels, Belgium, and the largest of its kind in the Brussels-Capital Region. It closed in 2018.

== The park ==
Océade was established by Océade France as part of a three-park franchise, with the other two parks located in France. It was the only park remaining in business after the French parks closed. Running at a loss, the park was acquired by the Walibi Group in 1992, with management experience built up through Aqualibi, near Wavre, just south of Brussels.

The park was continuously expanded and renovated. It consisted of fourteen water slides. These slides included the Hurricane, record holder for the fastest European slide (average speed 40 km/h (25 mph)), the Barracuda, the longest duo slide in Belgium, and the Anaconda, a slide with a width of 2.1 m (6 ft 11 in). De Cameleon was an interactive slide whereby people could customise the colour themselves. The park kept a constant temperature of 29 °C.

With over 240,000 visitors per year and a combined volume of 1,800 m^{3} (64,000 cu ft) of water, Océade was a major leisure attraction in the Brussels-Capital Region.

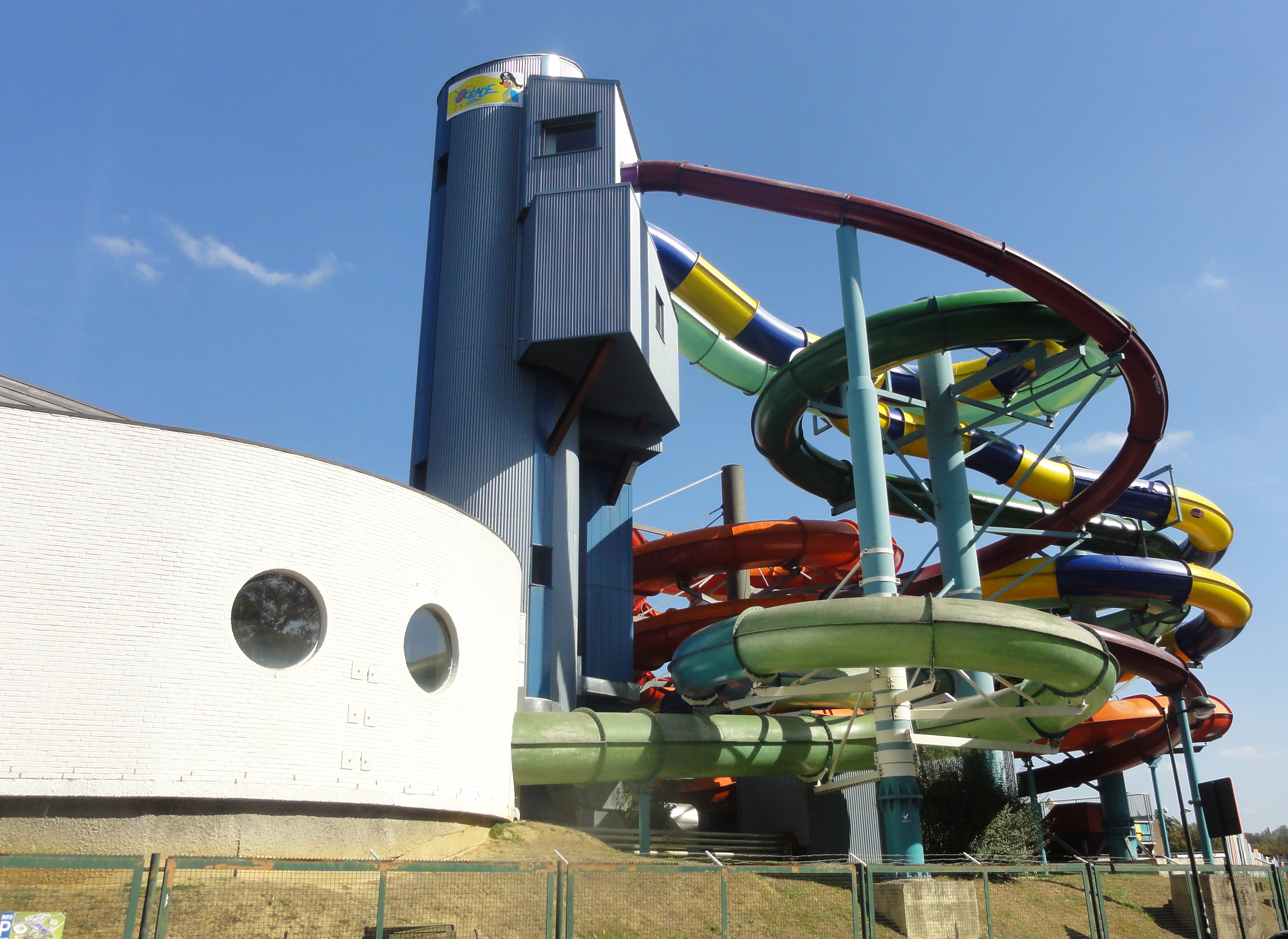
Four main slides

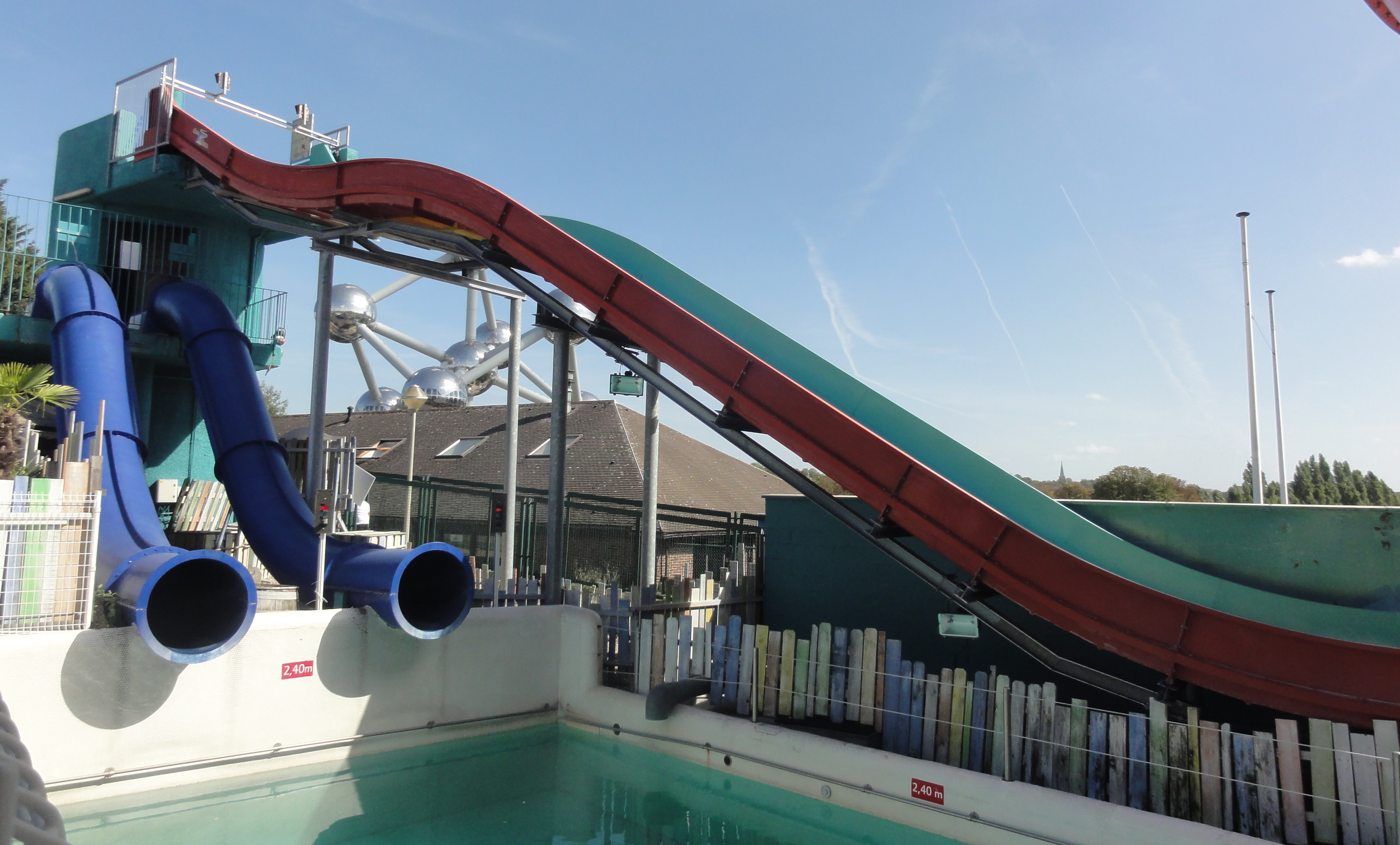
Bala de Canon and Salto Angel

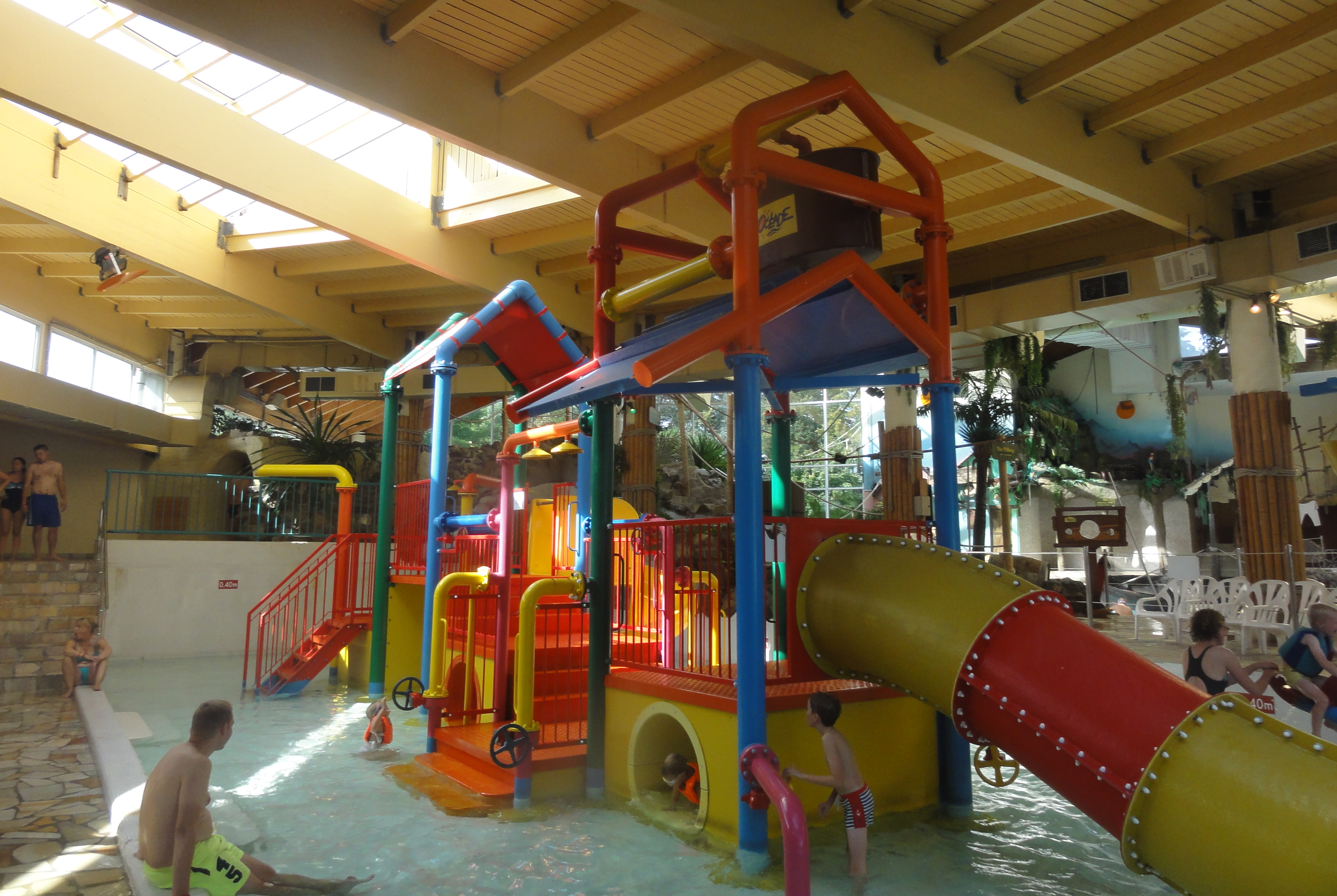
Kids area

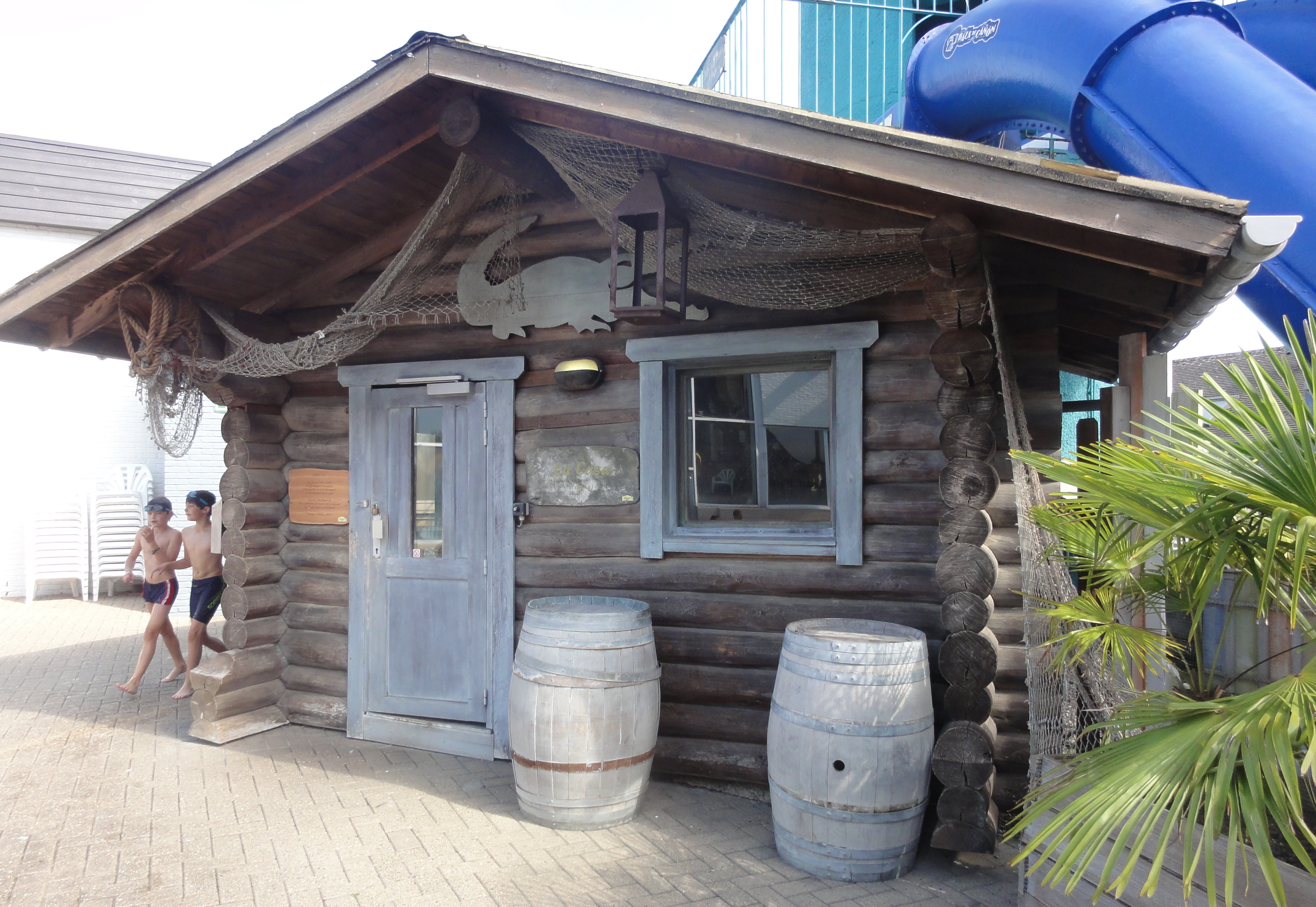
Sauna

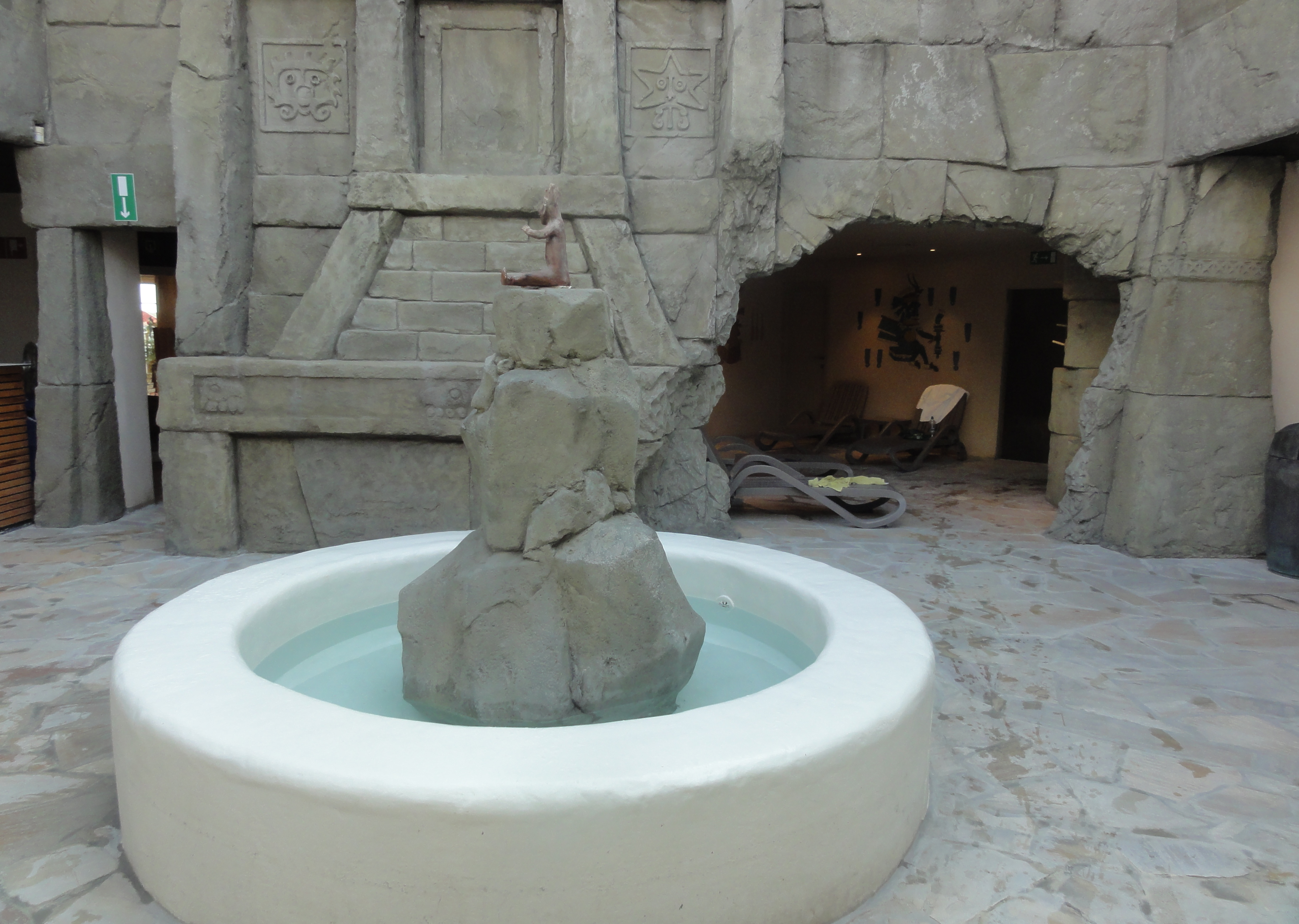
Saunaland

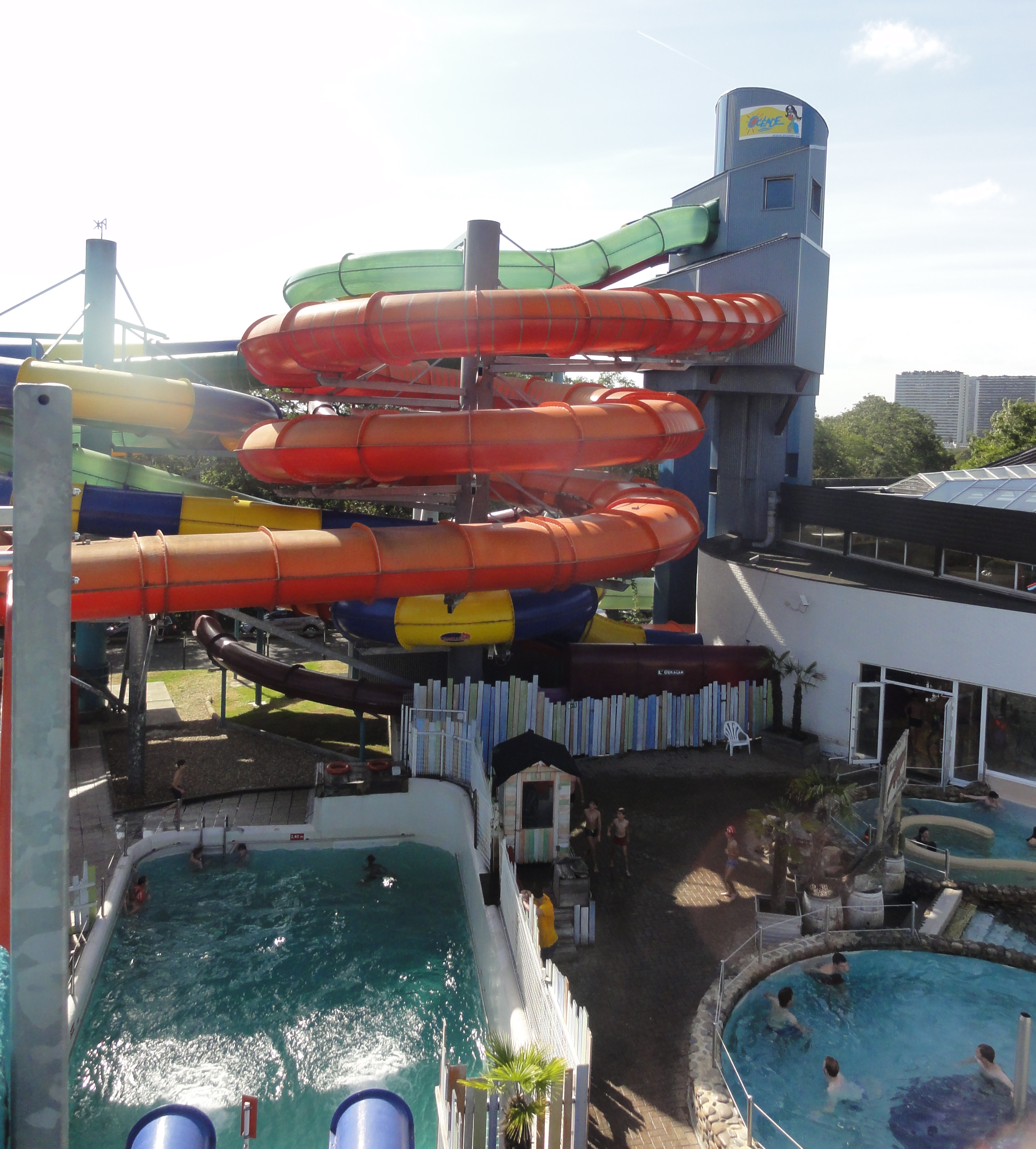
Exterior part

== Closure ==
In 2016, the Brussels City Council announced Océade would be forced to close to make space for its NEO project, a redevelopment project envisioning the replacement of most of the Bruparck entertainment park (including Kinepolis cinema and Océade) on the Heysel/Heizel Plateau with a shopping district and residential area. Under public protest, closure was repeatedly postponed until the definitive closing date of 30 September 2018. All water slides were purchased at a public auction by a Romanian company at a cost of €152,000, and the remaining pumps, saunas, kitchen equipment and furniture were sold for another €100,000. It was planned to reconstruct Océade in Romania, presumably near Bucharest.

== See also ==
- List of water parks in Europe
