= Omicron (disambiguation) =

Omicron (Ο or ο) is the 15th letter of the Greek alphabet.

Omicron, Omikron, Ο or ο may also refer to:

== Science ==
- SARS-CoV-2 Omicron variant, a variant of the virus that causes COVID-19
- Omicron (wasp), a genus of wasps
- Polynucleobacter necessarius, a bacterium originally designated as Omicron (German: Omikron)

== Other uses ==
- ο, ο̅, Οʹ, the number 70 in ancient, Byzantine and modern Greek numerals
- Omicron (film), a 1963 Italian film
- Omicron Hill, a summit in Alaska, US
- Omikron: The Nomad Soul, an adventure video game

== See also ==
- Omikronpapillomavirus, a genus of viruses
- (omicron)
- (omicron)
- O (disambiguation)
- Omnicron (disambiguation)
