= Kondaa =

Steel roller coaster at Walibi Belgium

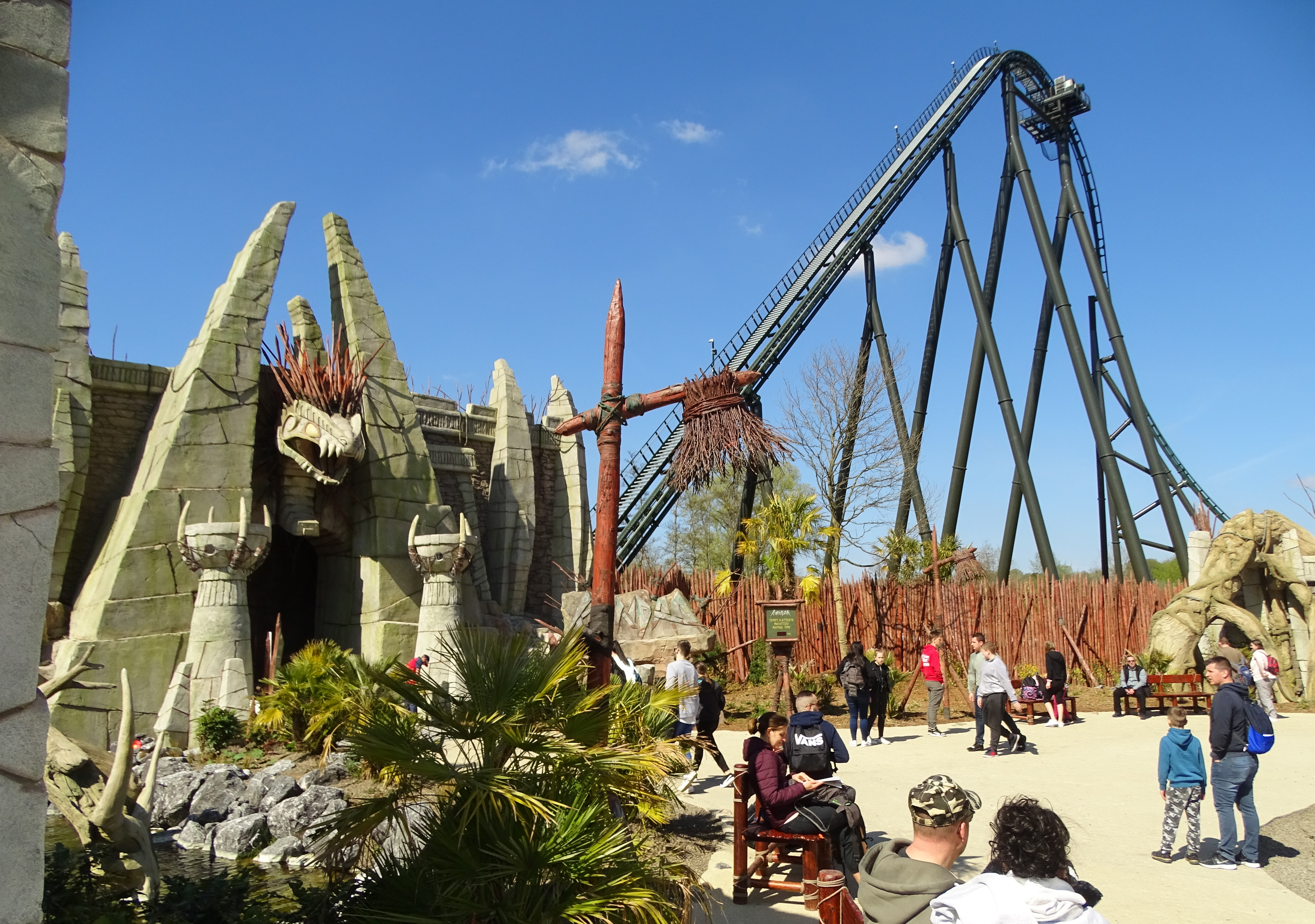

Walibi Belgium
- Location: Walibi Belgium
- Park section: Exotic World
- Coordinates: 50.697714°N 4.584990°E
- Status: Operating
- Opening date: May 8, 2021
- Cost: €25,000,000

General statistics
- Type: Steel
- Manufacturer: Intamin
- Model: Mega Coaster
- Lift/launch system: Chain lift hill
- Height: 164 ft (50 m)
- Length: 3,937 ft (1,200 m)
- Speed: 70.2 mph (113.0 km/h)
- Inversions: 0
- Duration: 1:30
- Max vertical angle: 80°
- Capacity: 1080 riders per hour
- G-force: 4.5
- Height restriction: 130–195 cm (4 ft 3 in – 6 ft 5 in)
- Trains: 2 trains with 6 cars; riders arranged 2 across in 2 rows for a total of 24 riders per train
- Website: Official site
- Kondaa at RCDB

Kondaa is a steel roller coaster at Walibi Belgium in Wavre, Belgium. First unveiled at the IAAPA 2018 Expo, the coaster marks the end of a three-year park investment plan and upon opening became the tallest and fastest coaster in the Benelux region, as well as the park's ninth coaster. Kondaa features a top speed of 70.2 mph (113.0 km/h), a notable 15 airtime moments, and the world's first non-inverting cobra roll element.

== History ==
Following the opening of Pulsar the year prior, in June 2017, Walibi announced a major multi-year plan to redesign and transform the park, with an accumulated total of €100,000,000 to be invested on new rides and parkwide theming, starting with the Tiki-Waka coaster and Exotic World area in 2018. The announcement also listed a major new steel coaster as the star investment of 2021, with early artwork showcasing an out-and-back mega coaster located near the upcoming Tiki-Waka.

Walibi officials shortlisted three major European suppliers for the project, eventually contracting Intamin to build the coaster following the 2017 annual IAAPA Berlin expo. At the 2018, annual IAAPA Orlando expo, Intamin and park operator Compagnie des Alpes formally unveiled two new coaster projects in a joint announcement; the then-unnamed Toutatis at Parc Astérix and the mega coaster for Walibi Belgium, which was confirmed once again to be debuting in 2021. The Walibi coaster layout was unveiled in full detail, and was confirmed to debut with a top height of 164 feet (50 m) and a top speed of 70.2 mph (113.0 km/h), making it the tallest and fastest coaster in the Benelux region upon opening (beating Goliath at Walibi Holland for height and Fury at Bobbejaanland for speed). It would also feature a total track length of 3,937 feet (1,200 m) and two world's-first elements; a wall stall and a non-inverting cobra roll. Kondaa opened to the public on May 8, 2021.

In August 2019, land clearing began on the site, indicating that construction was due to start shortly. An existing building behind the park was also razed in early 2020. Following the construction of the station, the coaster went vertical in July 2020, with track being installed at a rapid pace. The signature non-inverted cobra roll and the ride's tallest lift hill were topped off and completed in early August, with the ride layout being completed the following month. Thematic work would begin to take shape around the area, and in late November the ride's then-unannounced name was divulged from the newly constructed entrance sign; Kondaa. This was later confirmed by Walibi themselves.

On December 17, 2020, Kondaa passed its first full-circuit test run, and Walibi soon began releasing teasers on their YouTube channel. Kondaa's first onride POV was released on May 5, 2021, and following an easing of COVID-19 restrictions, the park made plans to debut the ride on May 8, 2021. Kondaa premiered on the planned date to great public anticipation.

== Ride experience ==
Riders are dispatched from the station into the initial 164-foot (50 m) lift hill at a 45 degree angle. Upon cresting the hill, riders hit an 80° drop twisting sharply to the right, and into a 38-metre (125 ft) tall airtime, producing G forces as low as -1.3 Gs. The train veers up into a 30-metre (98 ft) tall, sharply outwards banked airtime hill, and into the signature non-inverting cobra roll. Riders exit the element into another airtime hill, followed immediately by a sweeping turnaround, a wall-stall, and an overbanked turnaround at 115°. Now heading back to the station, riders encounter the following elements in this order, which are taken at a high speed and key airtime features; an airtime hill, a side-banked double down that has been advertised as a world's first, another airtime hill, an S curve, a Stengel Dive, S-jump, and a trio of bunny hills. Following this sequence, riders pop up into the brake run at a 25° angle, and make a 180° turn to the left into the station.

== Characteristics ==
Kondaa is 164 feet (50 m) in height, has an approximate track length of 1,200 metres (3,900 ft), and can hit speeds of up to 70.2 mph (113.0 km/h). The coaster focuses mainly on airtime, producing negative g-forces as low as 1.3 Gs and inducing weightlessness throughout much of the layout, packing a full 15 airtime points. Kondaa utilizes a pair of 24 passenger trains, which will enable the ride to have a theoretical capacity of 1080 pph.

In addition to airtime, Kondaa features several elements that are said to be world's firsts, most prominently its non-inverting cobra roll. This element works exactly like a cobra roll inversion (which can be found on Walibi Belgium's Cobra roller coaster), except that the element is a little more elongated and twists outwards instead on inwards in order to avoid going upside down.

== Rankings ==
Golden Ticket Awards: Top steel Roller Coasters
| Year | | | | | | | | | 1998 | 1999 |
|---|---|---|---|---|---|---|---|---|---|---|
| Ranking | | | | | | | | | – | – |
| Year | 2000 | 2001 | 2002 | 2003 | 2004 | 2005 | 2006 | 2007 | 2008 | 2009 |
| Ranking | – | – | – | – | – | – | – | – | – | – |
| Year | 2010 | 2011 | 2012 | 2013 | 2014 | 2015 | 2016 | 2017 | 2018 | 2019 |
| Ranking | – | – | – | – | – | – | – | – | – | – |
| Year | 2020 | 2021 | 2022 | 2023 | 2024 | 2025 | 2026 | | | |
| Ranking | N/A | – | – | – | 28 | 20 | 27 | | | |
