= Panic Coaster – Back Daaan =

Indoor family roller coaster at Tokyo Dome City

Panic Coaster - Back Daaan

Tokyo Dome City Attractions
- Location: Tokyo Dome City Attractions
- Park section: Geopolis
- Coordinates: 35.7045°N 139.7540°E
- Status: Operating
- Soft opening date: March 20, 2019; 7 years ago
- Opening date: March 23, 2019; 7 years ago
- Replaced: Tokyo Panic Cruise

General statistics
- Type: Steel – Shuttle – Enclosed
- Manufacturer: Gerstlauer
- Model: Family Coaster
- Lift/launch system: Two Tire propelled launches
- Height: 13.5 ft (4.1 m)
- Length: 767.7 ft (234.0 m)
- Speed: 18.6 mph (29.9 km/h)
- Inversions: 0
- Duration: 2:00
- Height restriction: 100 cm (3 ft 3 in)
- Trains: 2 trains with 8 cars; riders arranged 2 across in a single row for a total of 16 riders per train
- Admission: 1000 Yen per ride
- Website: Official website
- Skip Pass Available
- Panic Coaster - Back Daaan at RCDB

Panic Coaster – Back Daaan (Japanese: パニックコースターバックダーン) is an indoor family roller coaster at the Tokyo Dome City in Bunkyō, Tokyo, Japan. The ride experience relies heavily on vibrantly colored projections and light displays, and navigates the ride layout both forwards and backwards.

== History ==
In July 2018, reports indicated that the popular Tokyo Panic Cruise dark ride, located in the indoor Geopolis section of the park, would be retired in September of that year. The ride, alongside the Lupin III Labyrinth Trap, was permanently closed on September 2, 2018, under the premise that they would respectively be replaced by a pair of new attractions; Panic Coaster – Back Daaan and the Gan Fun Battlers 3D shooting attraction. The family-friendly Panic Coaster would be Geopolis' first indoor coaster since Geopanic was removed a decade earlier, and the first new coaster at the Tokyo Dome City since the Thunder Dolphin megacoaster in 2003.

Construction work and preparation was temporarily paused on September 15, after a resulting Carbon monoxide buildup in the indoor space affected seven workers, hospitalizing one of them for nine days.

After soft openings from March 20 to 22, Panic Coaster – Back Daaan and the Gan Gun Battlers opened to the public on March 23, 2019.

== Characteristics ==
=== Ride experience ===
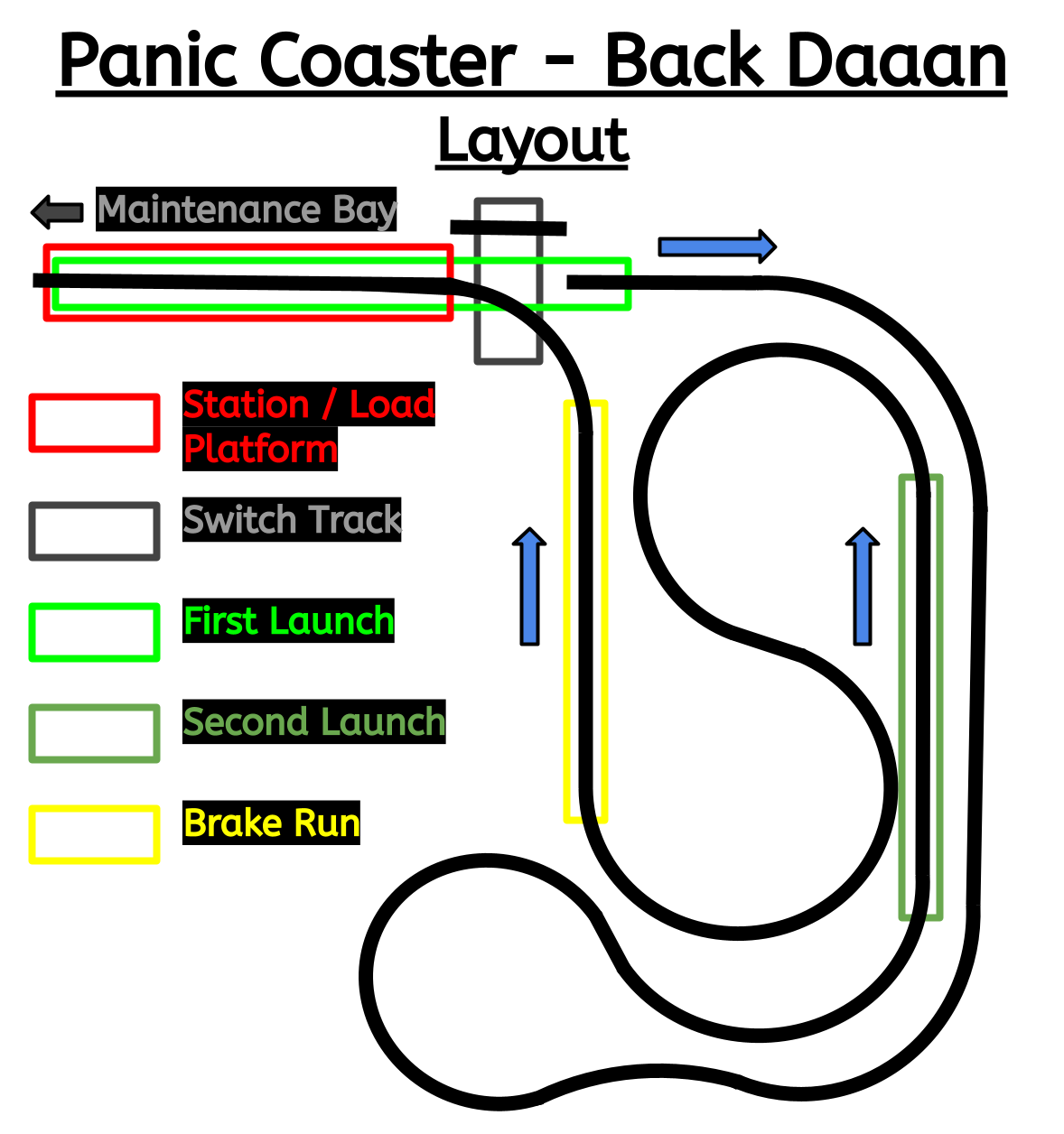
Layout of the roller coaster

The physical track layout is fairly minimal; various twists and turns are navigated close to the room's floor, and the attraction's second launch is located halfway through the layout to keep the train moving. At the end of the layout, the train is slowed by a brake run and utilizes a switch track to re-enter the station from the same way that it left it. As a direct result of this, the train will be facing the opposite direction that it had been facing when leaving the station beforehand.

Once the ride is able to begin, the station room is darkened and the doors are closed, allowing for the walls on either side of the train to be used as projection screens. A cartoon bomb is shown bouncing along the walls, and when it detonates, riders are launched into the layout. The first lap is navigated forwards and entirely in the dark. As a result of the switch track, the train enters the station facing the opposite direction. The bomb reappears on the walls, albeit noticeably stronger than before. When it does detonate, riders are launched backwards into the ride layout, although this time colorful decorations are lit throughout the room and J-pop music is played. Mirrors on multiple sides of the room are also aligned to create an infinity mirror setup. Once the train returns to the station platform, now facing forwards, riders are thanked on the projection screens, and disembark the train. One full cycle of the ride lasts approximately 2 minutes.

=== Statistics ===
Panic Coaster stands 13.5 feet (4.1 m) tall, has a physical track length of 767.7-foot (234.0 m), and reaches a top speed of 18.6 mph (29.9 km/h). The coaster train is propelled by a pair of flywheel launches, with one located in the station and the other situated midway through the layout. During a full ride, the train passes through each of these twice, enabling riders to experience a total of four launches. Panic Coaster is also only able to operate with a single train at a time, which has eight single-row cars that seat a pair of riders for a total occupancy of 16 passengers. The coaster hardware was designed and manufactured by Gerstlauer.
