= Tokyo Dome City Attractions =

Amusement park in Tokyo

- Previously known as Korakuen Yuenchi
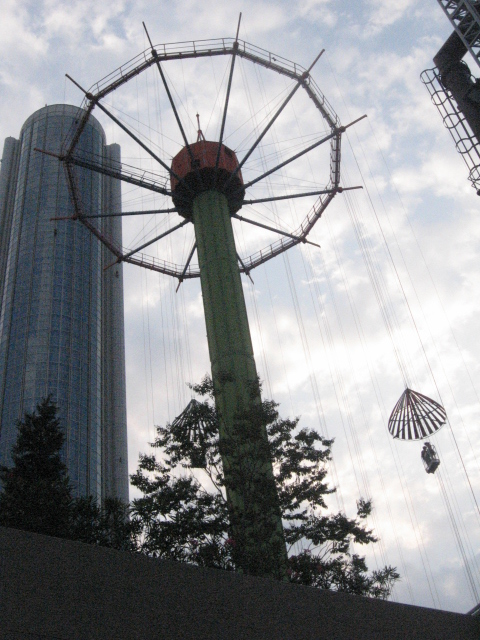
- "Sky Flower" at Tokyo Dome City Attractions
- Interactive map of Tokyo Dome City Attractions
- Location: Tokyo Dome City, Bunkyō, Tokyo, Japan
- Coordinates: 35°42′19″N 139°45′14″E
- Opened: 1958
- Website: Official website

Tokyo Dome City Attractions (東京ドームシティアトラクションズ, Tōkyō Dōmu Shiti Atorakushonzu) is an amusement park located next to the Tokyo Dome in Bunkyō, Tokyo, Japan, and forms a part of the Tokyo Dome City entertainment complex. It opened in 1958, and was formerly known as Korakuen Amusement Park (後楽園ゆうえんち, Kōrakuen Yūenchi) until April 2003. It was one of the most popular amusement parks in Tokyo. Rides include the Big O Ferris wheel and Thunder Dolphin roller coaster.

== Attractions ==
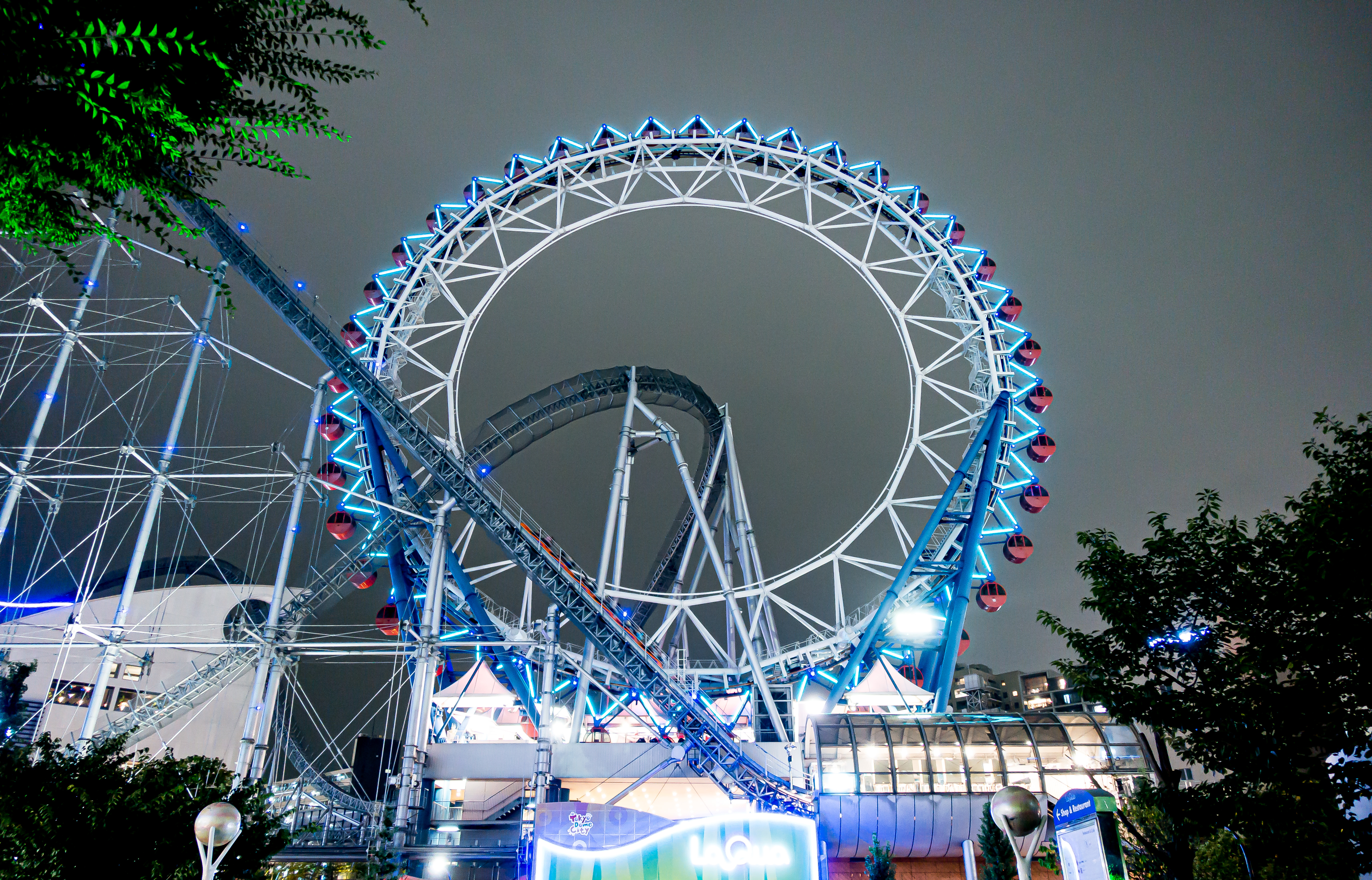
Tokyo Dome City Ferris Wheel and roller coaster tracks

=== LaQua ===
- Big-O (Ferris wheel)
- Thunder Dolphin (roller coaster)
- Wonder Drop (water slide)
- Venus Lagoon (merry-go-round)
- The Dive (shooting ride)
- Water Symphony (fountain show)

=== Viking Zone ===
- Bun Bun Bee
- Carousel
- Ba-Ba-Ba Viking (swinging ship)

=== Splash Garden ===
- Pixie Cup (teacups)
- Power Tower
- Corocco
- Magical Mist

=== Tower Zone ===
- Bloom Express
- Water Cannons
- Flash Rush
- Haunted House

=== Geopolis ===
- Panic Coaster – Back Daaan
- Gan! Gun! Battlers!
- Nin-Nin Land
- Ultra Seven THE ATTRACTION

=== Other ===
- Super Sentai Hero Action Show

== Former attractions ==
=== Viking Zone ===
- Super Viking SORABUNE (swinging ship)
- Furi Furi Grand Prix (go-cart)
- Tower Hacker (drop tower)
- Kids Hacker (mini drop tower)

=== Tower Zone ===
The area was formerly known as Parachute Zone until August 2024.

- Chapu Chapu Creek
- Linear Gale (roller coaster)
- Sky Flower
- Spinning Coaster Maihime (roller coaster)

=== Geopolis ===
- Tokyo Panic Cruise
- Lupin III: Labyrinth Trap
- Geopanic

=== Other ===
- MagiQuest Mega Kingdom

== Accidents ==
- On 29 February 2010, a 26-year-old worker lost three fingers while inspecting the Tower Hacker ride before the park opened in the morning.
- On 5 December 2010, a nine-year-old girl suffered minor injuries after being hit by a bolt which had fallen from the Thunder Dolphin roller coaster.
- On 30 January 2011, a 34-year-old man was killed after falling from the Spinning Coaster Maihime roller coaster at the park.
