= Goliath (Walibi Holland) =

Steel roller coaster

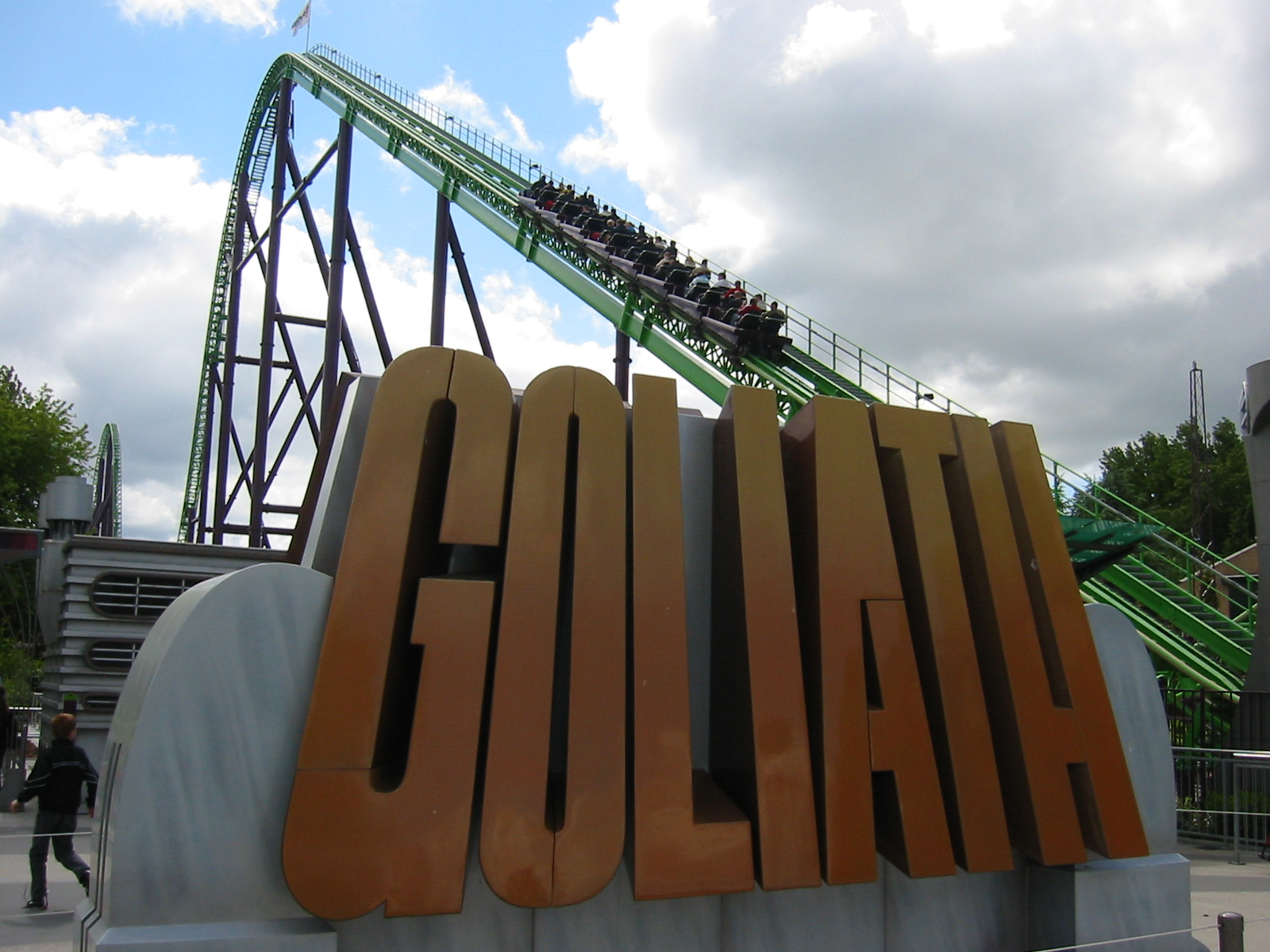

Walibi Holland
- Location: Walibi Holland
- Park section: Speed Zone
- Coordinates: 52°26′19″N 5°45′41″E
- Status: Operating
- Opening date: March 29, 2002

General statistics
- Type: Steel
- Manufacturer: Intamin
- Designer: Werner Stengel
- Model: Mega Coaster
- Lift/launch system: Cable lift hill
- Height: 46.84 m (153.7 ft)
- Drop: 45.99 m (150.9 ft)
- Length: 1,214 m (3,983 ft)
- Speed: 106 km/h (66 mph)
- Inversions: 0
- Duration: 1:32
- Max vertical angle: 70°
- G-force: 4
- Height restriction: 140 cm (4 ft 7 in)
- Trains: 2 trains with 8 cars. Riders are arranged 2 across in 2 rows for a total of 32 riders per train.
- Goliath at RCDB

Video

Goliath is a steel roller coaster located at the Walibi Holland theme park in Biddinghuizen, Dronten, in the Netherlands. It was previously described as "the fastest, highest, and longest coaster in the Benelux". Since 2021, both these records belong to Kondaa in Walibi Belgium. It was mainland Europe's second Intamin "Mini Hyper Rollercoaster", so named because the ride is styled on the larger (generally over 61 metres (200 ft)) ride, but with a lower maximum height of 47 metres (154 ft). The train travels at speeds of up to 107 kilometres per hour (66 mph) along 1,214 metres (3,983 ft) of track.

== Ride information ==
The roller coaster is another collaboration between the Swiss manufacturer Intamin and the German engineer Werner Stengel. It employs similar lift-hill technology to Expedition GeForce, using a cable lift. The ride premiered in the 2002 season.

== Ride layout ==
After climbing out of the station, the train is released from the catch car at the top of the lift hill and accelerates down the 152-foot (46 m) first drop and runs over a large hill. After dropping for the second time, it ascends a hill called a Stengel Dive, the top being overbanked to around 100° to the right, before dropping down into a 270° downward helix. After a medium-sized curved hill, it negotiates a 380° upwards helix and a bend to take the track parallel to the lift hill. Before entering the brake run, riders experience considerable air-time on three bunny hops.

== Trains ==
Goliath has two trains, each with eight cars. Each car seats two across in two rows. The trains are made of steel and have stadium-style seating. Restraints are hydraulic lap bars.

== Gallery ==
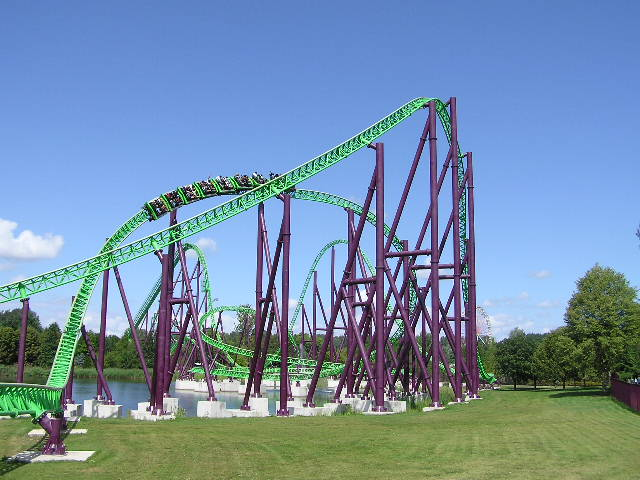
Overview of the roller coaster.

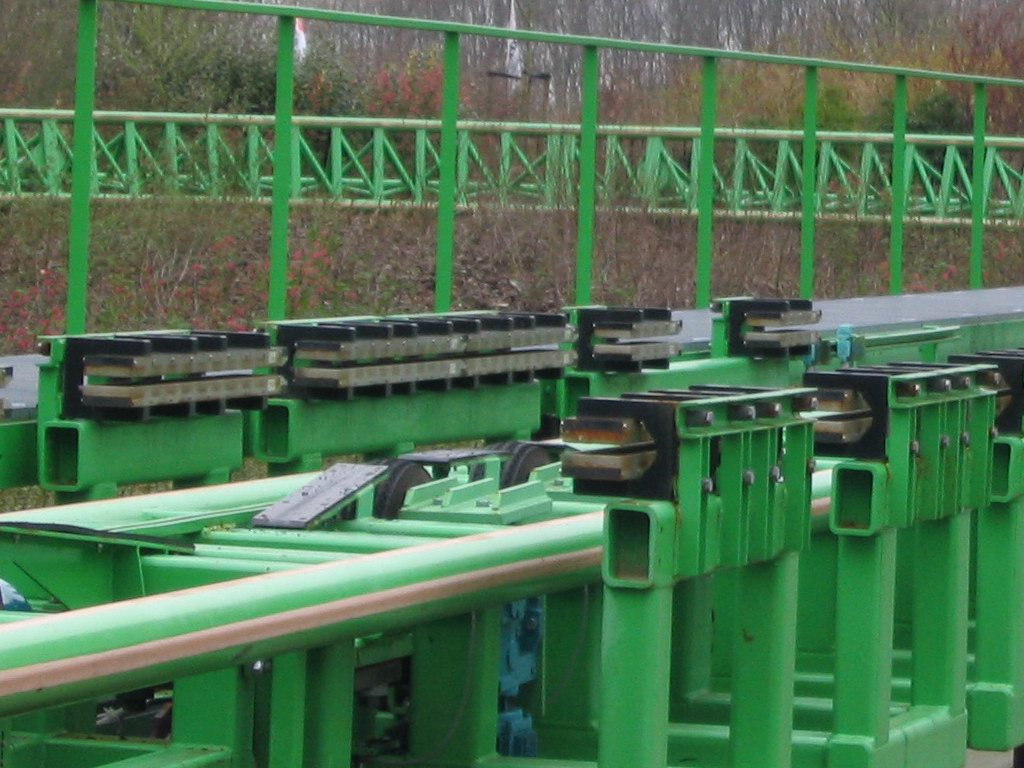
A close up of the braking system.

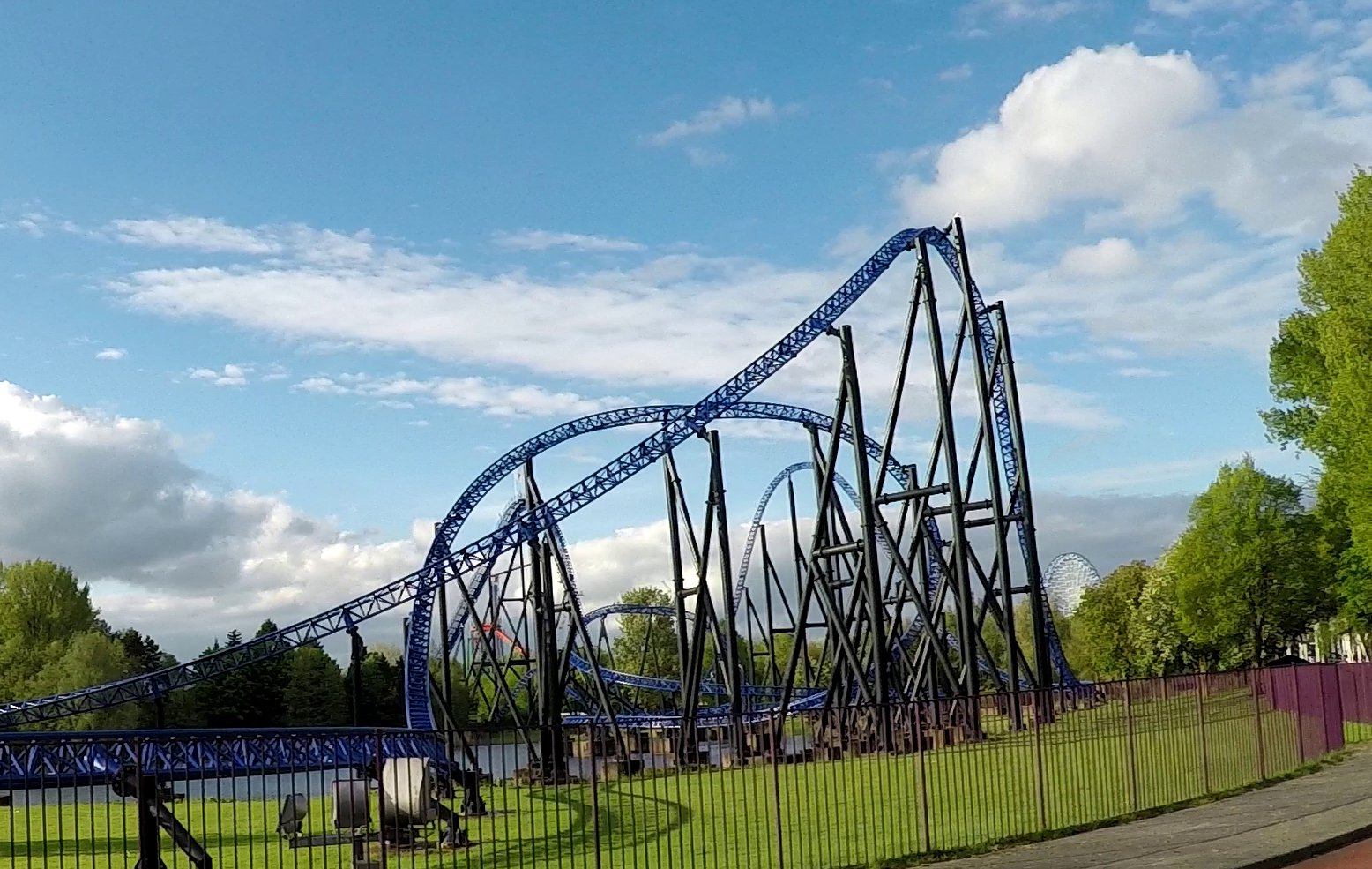
Goliath repainted in blue with black supports in 2017.
