= O (disambiguation) =

O, or o, is the fifteenth letter of the English alphabet and the Latin script.

O may also refer to:

== Letters ==
- U+0555 Օ ARMENIAN CAPITAL LETTER OH, U+0585 օ ARMENIAN SMALL LETTER OH, letters in the Armenian alphabet
- U+10FF ჿ GEORGIAN LETTER LABIAL SIGN, a letter in the Georgian alphabet
- Ο ο, Omicron, (Greek), a letter in the Greek alphabet, where Latin o is derived from
- O (Cyrillic), a letter of the Cyrillic alphabet
- O (kana), a romanization of the kana (お and オ) in Japanese writing
- U+3147 ㅇ HANGUL LETTER IEUNG, a consonant in Hangul, the Korean alphabet
- U+101D ဝ MYANMAR LETTER WA, a consonant in Burmese script

== Arts and entertainment ==
=== Film and television ===
- O (2001 film), a film starring Mekhi Phifer, Josh Hartnett, and Julia Stiles
- O (2022 film), an Indian Kannada-language horror thriller film

=== Literature ===
- O: A Presidential Novel, anonymous novel published in 2011
- O, fictional planet that is the setting of several short stories by science fiction author Ursula K. Le Guin
- O, fictional character from the French erotic novel Story of O
- "O" Is for Outlaw, the fifteenth novel in Sue Grafton's "Alphabet mystery" series, published in 1999

=== Media and publications ===
- O, The Oprah Magazine, magazine founded by Oprah Winfrey
- O (German magazine), a fetish magazine

=== Music ===
- "O (Oh!)", 1920 by Ted Lewis, 1953 by Pee Wee Hunt
- O (A.C. Acoustics album), 2002
- O (Damien Rice album), 2002
- O (Eiko Shimamiya album), 2006
- O (Omarion album), 2005
  - "O" (Omarion song), the title song
- O (Oval album), 2010
- o (Tilly and the Wall album), 2008
- O (EP), a 2023 EP by Yuju
- O, 2002 album by Zone
- "O", a 2014 song by Coldplay from Ghost Stories
- "o", a song by iamamiwhoami
- "O!", a song by the American band Bright from The Albatross Guest House, 1997
- O (musician), nickname of the American musician Otis Barthoulameu
- A Band Called O

=== Sports ===
- O (gesture), a gesture used to show support for the sports teams of the University of Oregon
- Baltimore Orioles, an American Major League Baseball team, among whose common nicknames are "O's" and "The O's"
- Leyton Orient F.C., an English football club nicknamed "The O's"

=== Others ===
- O (Cirque du Soleil), show at the Bellagio hotel and casino in Las Vegas, Nevada

== Companies ==
- Essie's Original Hot Dog shop (commonly known as "The O"), a restaurant in Pittsburgh, Pennsylvania
- Overstock.com, online retailer previously known as O.co
- Realty Income, American real estate investment trust (NYSE stock ticker O)

== History ==
- O-class battlecruiser, class of German ships in the 1930s
- The O (political group) (The Organization), a 1970s American political group

== Linguistics ==
- /o/, close-mid back rounded vowel in the International Phonetic Alphabet
- O, an antiquated vocative placed before a name of, or phrase characterizing, the party being addressed
- O (also P), the patient-like argument (object) of a canonical transitive verb
- O, gender neutral third person pronoun in the Turkish language
- O-, an honorific prefix used in the Japanese language

== Mathematics ==
- $f = O(g)$, a Bachmann–Landau notation in computational complexity theory ("|f| is bounded above by g asymptotically")
- $f = o(g)$, a Bachmann–Landau notation in computational complexity theory ("f is dominated by g asymptotically")
- O, for orthogonal group
- ∘ indicates function composition, or composition of morphisms in a category
- Category O or $\mathcal{O}$, a category of Lie algebra representations
- o, for octet, an information measure unit used in computing
- Kleene's O, a system of ordinal notations

== Media ==
- O, an IRC operator service in QuakeNet's IRC services
- O Channel, the former name of Moji a television network in Indonesia

== Places ==
- O Brook, a short river in Devon, England
- O'Block, a colloquial name for the Parkway Garden Homes in Chicago

== Science ==
- Oxygen, symbol O, a chemical element
- O, a human blood type, the universal donor
- Haplogroup O (Y-DNA), a Y-chromosomal DNA haplogroup
- O, for pyrrolysine an alpha amino acid in biochemistry
- O-type star, stellar classification for very hot bluish stars
- O (for Octavius, meaning an eighth of a gallon), an apothecary's symbol for a pint

== Surname ==
- O (surname), Korean surname romanized "O" or "Oh"
- Ō (Japanese surname), Japanese surname derived from the Chinese surname Wang (王)
- Ō clan a historical Japanese clan with an unrelated surname
- Ou (surname), Chinese and Cantonese surnames pronounced "O" or "Oh"
- A prefix meaning "grandson (of)", appearing in Irish surnames
- Genovevo de la O (1876–1952), Mexican revolutionary
- Karen O, born Karen Lee Orzolek, American singer

== Other uses ==
- Oreo O's, an American breakfast cereal available internationally
- Oscar, the military time zone code for UTC−02:00: List of military time zones#O
- , the official West Japan Railway Company service symbol for the Osaka Loop Line
- O, a handwritten symbol for a hug

== See also ==
- Mr. O (TV show)
- Circle (disambiguation)
- Circle symbol (disambiguation)
- Zero (disambiguation)
- Big O (disambiguation)
- Oh (disambiguation)
- Omicron (disambiguation) including Ο/ο
