= Big O =

Big O or The Big O may refer to:

== Mathematics and computing ==
- Big Omega function (disambiguation), various arithmetic functions in number theory
- Big O notation, asymptotic behavior in mathematics and computing
  - Time complexity in computer science, whose functions are commonly expressed in big O notation

== People ==
- Omar Gooding (born 1976), American actor, rapper, voice artist and comedian
- Oliver Miller (1970–2025), American professional basketball player
- Takashi Nagasaki (born 1958), Japanese author
- Barack Obama (born 1961), 44th President of the United States
- Roy Orbison (1936–1988), American singer-songwriter
- Glenn Ordway (born 1951), Boston-area sports radio host
- Otis Redding (1941–1967), American soul singer-songwriter and record producer
- OsamaSon (born 2003), American rapper sometimes referred to as 'Big O'
- Oscar Robertson (born 1938), former professional basketball player
- Oscar Santana, American radio personality
- Oprah Winfrey (born 1954), American television host, producer and philanthropist
- Oscar McInerney (born 1994), Australian rules footballer

== Structures and venues ==
- Big O (Ferris wheel), the world's largest centerless Ferris wheel, in Japan
- Big "O", a structure on Skinner Butte in Eugene, Oregon, United States, listed on the National Register of Historic Places
- Olympic Stadium (Montreal), Quebec, Canada; the main venue of the 1976 Summer Olympics
- Ontario Motor Speedway, California, USA; former superspeedway racecar track

== Other uses ==
- "The Big O", a name given to the Omaha–Council Bluffs metropolitan area
- The Big O, a 1999 Japanese animated TV series
- Omega (Ω), a Greek letter, whose name translates literally as "great O"
- Big O Tires, a tire retailer in the United States and Canada
- The Big O (album), by Roy Orbison
- Big Orange Chorus, a barbershop men's chorus in Jacksonville, Florida

== See also ==
- Bigo (disambiguation)
