= Tokyo Dome City =

Entertainment complex in Tokyo, Japan

Coordinates: 35°42′20.23″N 139°45′6.82″E

Tokyo Dome City (東京ドームシティ, Tōkyō Dōmu Shiti), referred to as Big Egg City before January 1, 2000, is an entertainment complex in Bunkyō, Tokyo, Japan.

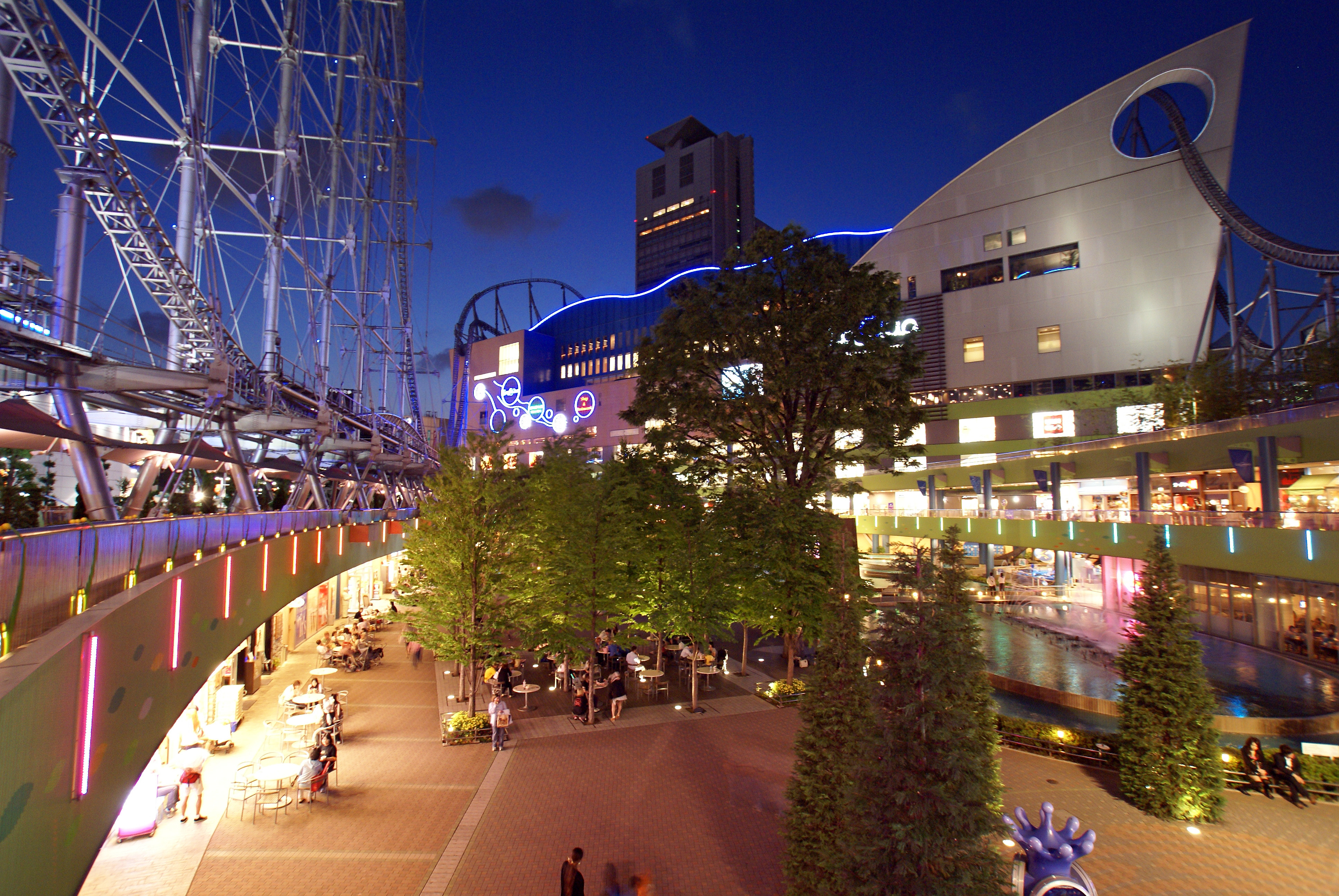
Part of the amusement center.

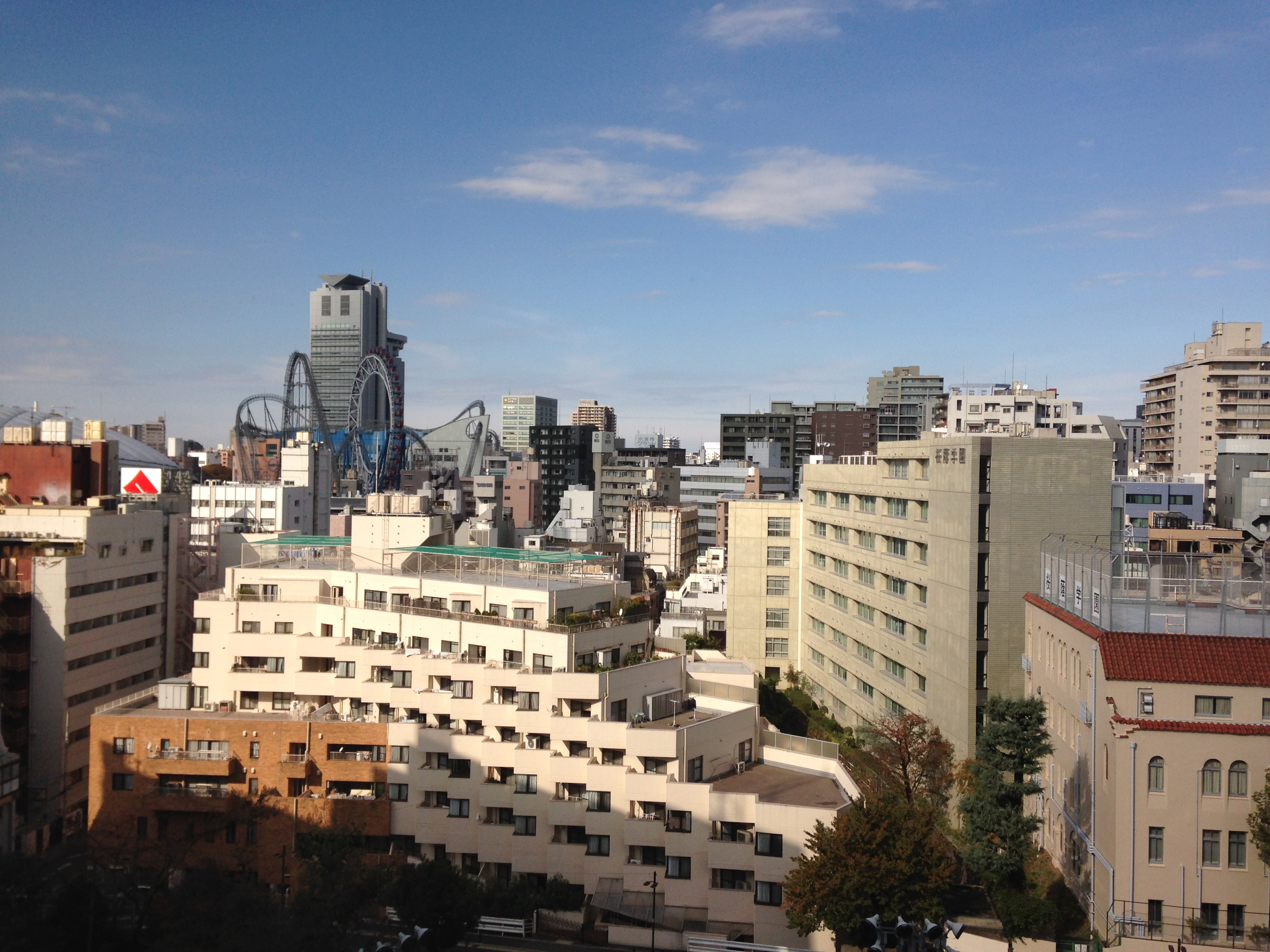
Tokyo Dome City Looking from the East near Suidōbashi Station

It also includes the world's largest roofed baseball stadium, known as Tokyo Dome (AKA "Big Egg"); an amusement park known as Tokyo Dome City Attractions (formerly Kōrakuen Yūenchi); and Korakuen Hall. In May 2003, a spa resort known as LaQua opened for business near Tokyo Dome City Attractions. It also hosts character shows for Toei Company's Toei Superheroes, including the Kamen Rider and Super Sentai series (the Tokyo Dome Corporation is the Super Sentai series' main sponsor).

The Tokyo Dome City contains the Tokyo Dome Hotel, a 43-story hotel that is easy to spot from the street and from the Tokyo Subway Suidobashi Station, which is only two blocks away.

== Tokyo Dome City facilities ==
- Tokyo Dome baseball stadium
- LaQua spa, fitness center, and shopping mall complex
- Tokyo Dome City Attractions amusement park
  - Thunder Dolphin, an 80-metre (262.5 ft) Intamin hypercoaster
  - Big O, a centerless ferris wheel
  - Theatre G-Rosso
- Tokyo Dome Hotel, a 43-story hotel designed by the architect Kenzō Tange and tallest building in Bunkyō ward, as of 2026
- Yellow Building
  - Sauna Tokyo Dome, Korakuen Hall sports arena
- Blue Building
  - Tokyo Dome Bowling Center, Off-track betting (Wins Korekauen)
- MEETS PORT
  - Tokyo Dome City Hall

== Transportation ==
- Kōrakuen Station of several subway lines, integrated within the complex
- Kasuga Station of several subway lines, to the north
- Suidōbashi Station, a JR line station across a street from Tokyo Dome City

== See also ==
- Koishikawa Korakuen Garden is immediately to the west of the area.
