= Bigo =

Bigo may refer to:

- Bigo bya Mugenyi, archaeological site in Uganda
- Bigo Bay, Antarctica
- Bigo Live, a streaming platform
- Mount Bigo, Antarctica
- Didier Bigo (born 1956), French scholar of security studies
- Bigoriki, a character in American children's animated television series GoGoRiki
- Bigo (Genoa), architectural structure and tourist attraction in Genoa, Italy

== See also ==
- Richard Barnett (Capitol rioter), known as "Bigo"
- Big O (disambiguation)
