= Omicron acapulcense =

Scientific classification
- Domain: Eukaryota
- Kingdom: Animalia
- Phylum: Arthropoda
- Class: Insecta
- Order: Hymenoptera
- Family: Vespidae
- Genus: Omicron
- Species: O. acapulcense

Binomial name
- Omicron acapulcense Cameron, 1912

Subspecies
- Omicron acapulcense tenulum

Species of wasp

Omicron acapulsece is a species of neotropical wasps that belongs to the genus Omicron and is found in South and Central America. It was discovered by Cameron in the year 1912. The species is diurnal. There is one subsepecies, Omicron acapulcense tenulum.
