= Omicron regulum =

Scientific classification
- Domain: Eukaryota
- Kingdom: Animalia
- Phylum: Arthropoda
- Class: Insecta
- Order: Hymenoptera
- Family: Vespidae
- Genus: Omicron
- Species: O. regulum

Binomial name
- Omicron regulum Saussure, 1855

Subspecies
- Omicron regulum cuernavacense; Omicron regulum regulum

Species of wasp

Omicron regulum is a diurnal species of neotropical potter wasp, that is found in Central America.
