= Omnicron =

Omnicron may refer to:

== Arts and entertainment ==
- Omnicron, a musical project by Justin Lassen
- "Omnicron", a single by the hip-hop group Jedi Mind Tricks from the album The Psycho-Social, Chemical, Biological & Electro-Magnetic Manipulation of Human Consciousness
- Omnicron Conspiracy, a computer video game

=== Fictional entities ===
- Omnicron, a class of robot sniper characters in the miniature figure board wargame Heroscape
- Omnicron, a planet of the fictional cyborg character Combatron from the Filipino comic series Funny Komiks

== Companies ==
- Omnicron Electronics, developers of the TCC-14 Talking Clock/Calendar
- Omnicron Records, a music label in Barbourmeade, Kentucky, US

== See also ==
- Starbeams: The Omnicron Ray, an episode of the English language dub collection Robo Formers taken from the Japanese anime television series Getter Robo G
- OmnicronPsy, a fictional supercomputer in the donghau television series Zentrix
- SARS-CoV-2 Omicron variant (mispronounced "Omnicron"), a variant of the virus that causes COVID-19
- Omicron (disambiguation)
- Omnicons, in the Transformers: Energon anime television series
