= Lift hill =

Upward-sloping part of a roller coaster

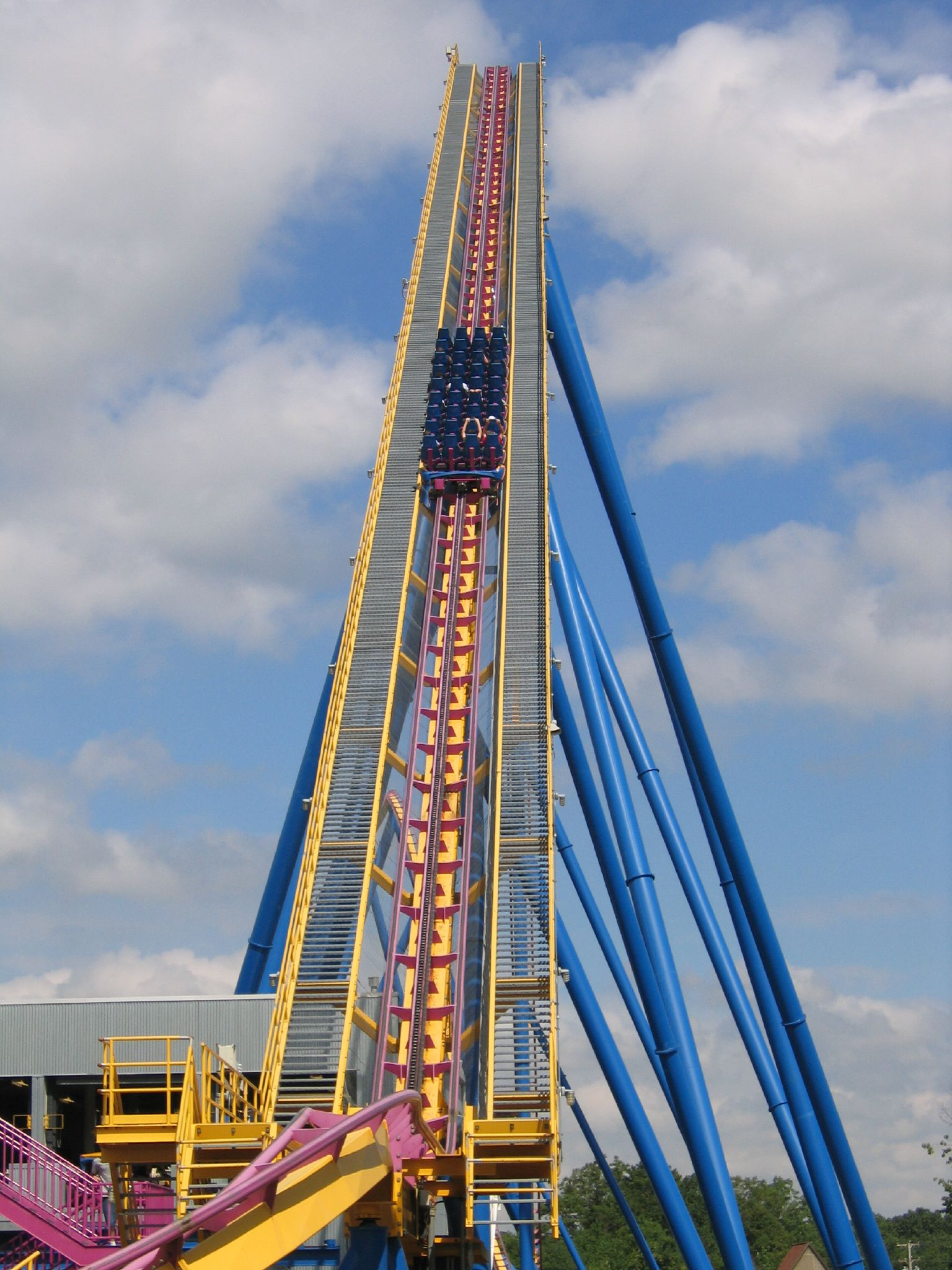
The lift hill of Nitro at Six Flags Great Adventure

A lift hill, or chain hill, is an upward-sloping section of track on a roller coaster on which the roller coaster train is mechanically lifted to an elevated point or peak in the track. Upon reaching the peak, the train is then propelled from the peak by gravity and is usually allowed to coast throughout the rest of the roller coaster ride's circuit on its own momentum, including most or all of the remaining uphill sections. The initial upward-sloping section of a roller coaster track is usually a lift hill, as the train typically begins a ride with little speed, though some coasters have raised stations that permit an initial drop without a lift hill. Although uncommon, some tracks also contain multiple lift hills.

Lift hills usually propel the train to the top of the ride via one of two methods: a chain lift involving a long, continuous chain which trains hook on to and are carried to the top; or a drive tire system in which multiple motorized tires (known as friction wheels) push the train upwards. A typical chain lift consists of a heavy piece of metal called a chain dog, which is mounted onto the underside of one of the cars which make up the train. This is in place to line up with the chain on the lift hill.

The chain travels through a steel trough, and is normally powered by one or more motors which are positioned under the lift hill. Chain dogs underneath each train are engaged by the chain and the train is pulled up the lift. Anti-rollback dogs engage a rack (ratcheted track) alongside the chain to prevent the train from descending the lift hill, which creates the distinctive "tick-tick-tick" noise as the train ascends. At the crest of the lift, the chain wraps around a gear wheel where it begins its return to the bottom of the lift; the train is continually pulled along until gravity takes over and it accelerates downhill. The spring-loaded chain and anti-rollback dogs will disengage themselves as this occurs.

== Intamin cable lift ==
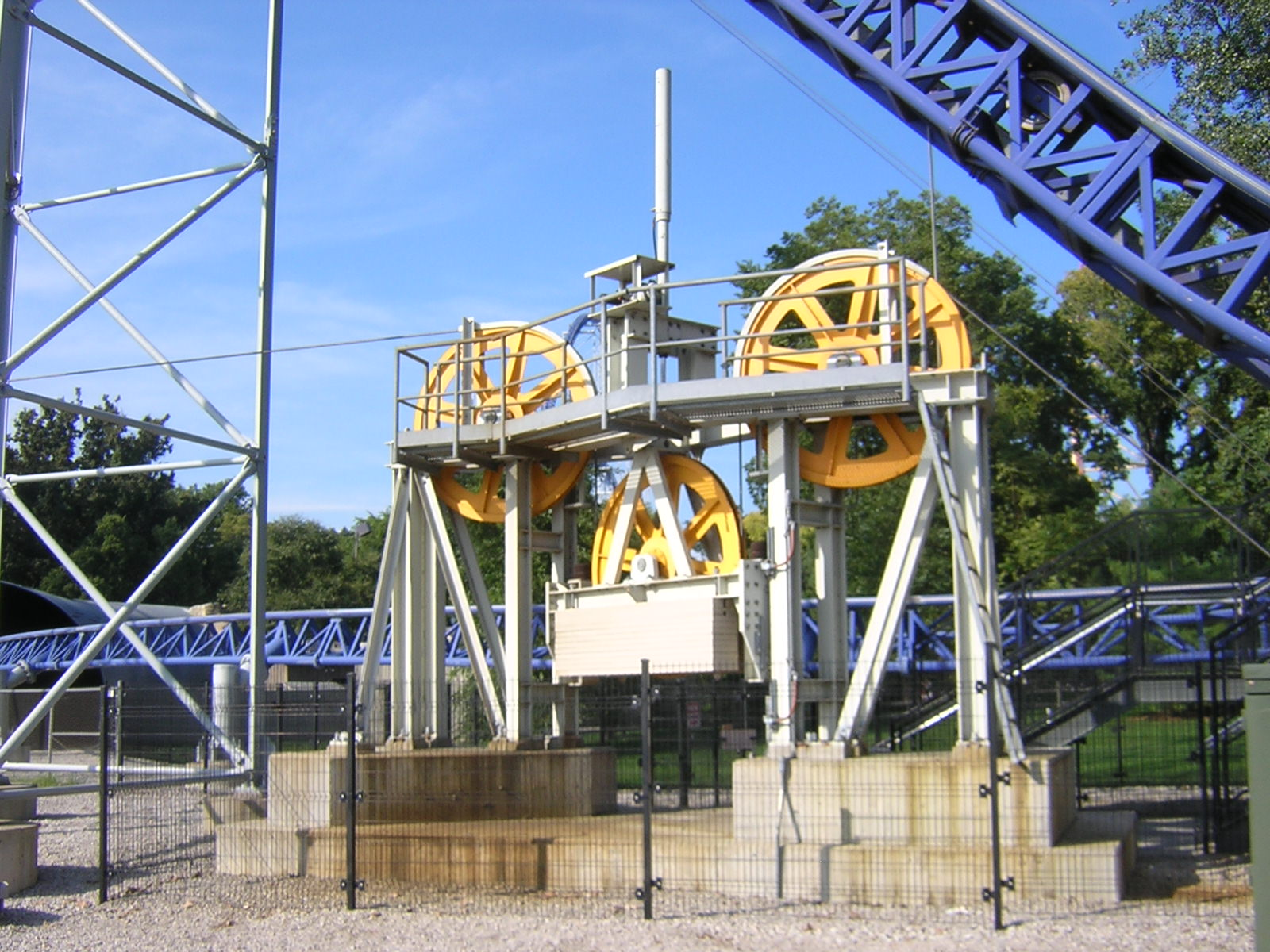
The cable lift tensioning mechanism on Millennium Force at Cedar Point

The Intamin cable lift is a type of lift mechanism that was first used on Millennium Force at Cedar Point in Sandusky, Ohio. This type of lift has also been used for Kings Dominion's Pantherian, Holiday Park's Expedition GeForce, Walibi Holland's Goliath, Djurs Sommerland's Piraten (Europe's only "Mega-Lite"-model coaster by Intamin), Tokyo Dome City's Thunder Dolphin, Hersheypark's Skyrush, Flying Aces at Ferrari World, and Altair at Cinecittà World. Currently, there are only two wooden roller coasters that utilize a cable lift hill: El Toro at Six Flags Great Adventure and T Express at Everland.

The cable lift utilizes a cable that is attached to a catch car that moves up and down the lift hill in a separate channel between the track rails. On several coasters the catch car rolls into the station and latches to the front cars of the train to carry it up the lift hill. This requires the lift hill to be positioned directly in front of the station. El Toro was the first coaster to incorporate a turn between the station and the cable lift hill and was the first (and so far only) of this type to engage the catch car while the train is moving. Once the train engages the catch car, the speed is increased and the train is quickly pulled to top of the lift. Because a cable is much lighter than a chain, cable lifts are much faster than chain lifts. A cable also requires far less maintenance than a chain. Another advantage to park guests is that a cable lift is very quiet, partly because the main drive winch is located directly beneath the top of the lift, a location which will normally be relatively far from guest-accessible areas.

== Ferris wheel lift ==
The Ferris wheel lift is a type of lift based on the rotating circular design of a ferris wheel. Created by Premier Rides, it existed on 'Round About' (formerly Maximum RPM) which operated at Freestyle Music Park in Myrtle Beach, South Carolina prior to being dismantled and moved to a park in Vietnam only to never operate and was later dismantled again. It uses a Ferris Wheel like motion to lift the cars to the top, as on a Ferris Wheel. The cars are then released onto the track.

== Elevator lift ==
The elevator lift is typically used on a single car or a short, double-car train. The vehicle moves into position on a piece of track that is then lifted vertically, along with the vehicle, operating very similar to a passenger elevator. Several of these systems use a single shaft and a second piece of track in the opposite position serves as the counterweight. With the single shaft the rail may curve to the left or right as the two tracks pass each other at the halfway point. The first coaster to use an elevator system with a counterweight was Batflyer at Lightwater Valley. It is believed that those same designers then founded Caripro, which then constructed nine vertical lift suspended coasters between 1997 and 2001. The Mack Rides-built Matterhorn Blitz at Europa Park was the first to use a two-track system with a single shaft.

== Friction wheel lift ==
A friction wheel lift is a type of lift mechanism in which two wheels are placed in either a horizontal or a vertical position. These are commonly used for brake runs, lifts, storage and more. The train has a small vertical lip, where the two friction wheels meet at each side. The wheels pull the train up slowly, while making a jet-like noise. An anti-rollback system is not needed, as the wheels are tight against the lip.

== Tilt lift/thrill lift section ==
A tilt lift is a new way to elevate coasters. The tilt lift is essentially an elevator lift, but the elevator lift rotates 90 degrees so that the train is now vertical, with the nose of the train facing the ground. This design has not been made yet; the only places where this occurs are in the video games RollerCoaster Tycoon 3, Thrillville Off the Rails and Coaster Crazy. However, there are coaster designs that use the tilting aspect of this lift already. The first operating tilt coaster in the world is Gravity Max at Lihpao Land in Taiwan. The coaster was built by Vekoma. In this coaster, after going up a chain hill, the train is held on a horizontal section of track, which then tilts forwards, to become a vertical section, which then leads into a vertical drop accelerated by gravity. The Chinese company Golden Horse has made several unofficial recreations, each featuring a less than vertical drop and significantly different track elements.

== Anti-rollback device ==
Diagram depicting the anti-rollback safety feature

The familiar "click-clack" sound that occurs as a roller coaster train ascends the lift hill is not caused by the chain itself. The cause for this noise is actually a safety device used on lift hills—the anti-rollback device. The anti-rollback device is a standard safety feature, typically consisting of a continuous, saw-toothed, section of metal, forming a linear ratchet.

Roller coaster trains are fitted with anti-rollback "dogs", essentially heavy-duty pieces of metal that fall and rest in each groove of the anti-rollback device on the track as the trains ascend the lift-hill. This makes the "clicking" sound and allows the train to go upwards only, effectively preventing the train from rolling back down the hill should it ever encounter a power failure or broken chain.

This feature was derived from the similar feature originally used on the Mauch Chunk Switchback Railway in Pennsylvania, starting in 1846. Under the power of a stationary steam engine, railway cars were drawn up two uphill planes that had two slightly different early forms of this anti-rollback device. The entire concept of the modern roller coaster was also initially inspired by this railroad.
