= Pulsar (roller coaster) =

Roller coaster at Walibi Belgium

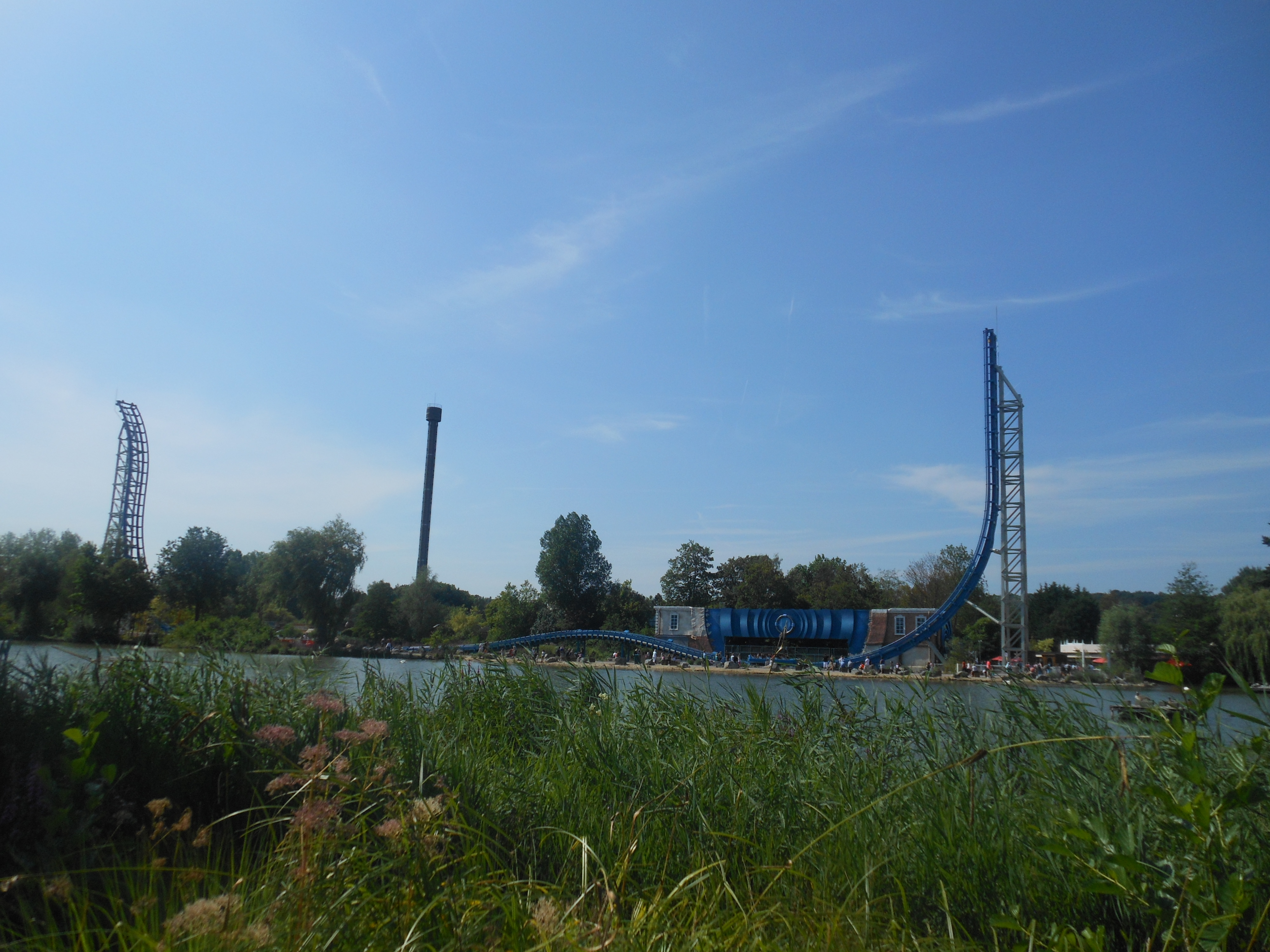

Walibi Belgium
- Location: Walibi Belgium
- Coordinates: 50.6988°N 4.5903°E
- Status: Operating
- Opening date: 4 June 2016
- Cost: €8,500,000

General statistics
- Type: Steel – Launched – Shuttle
- Manufacturer: Mack Rides
- Model: PowerSplash
- Lift/launch system: LSM launch
- Height: 45 m (148 ft)
- Length: 217 m (712 ft)
- Speed: 101 km/h (63 mph)
- Inversions: 0
- Duration: 1:18
- Max vertical angle: 90°
- Capacity: 960 riders per hour
- Trains: 2 trains with a single car; riders arranged 4 across in 5 rows for a total of 20 riders per train
- Pulsar at RCDB

Pulsar is a steel launched shuttle roller coaster at Walibi Belgium in Wavre, Belgium. It opened on 4 June 2016 as the first PowerSplash model by German manufacturer Mack Rides.

== Characteristics ==
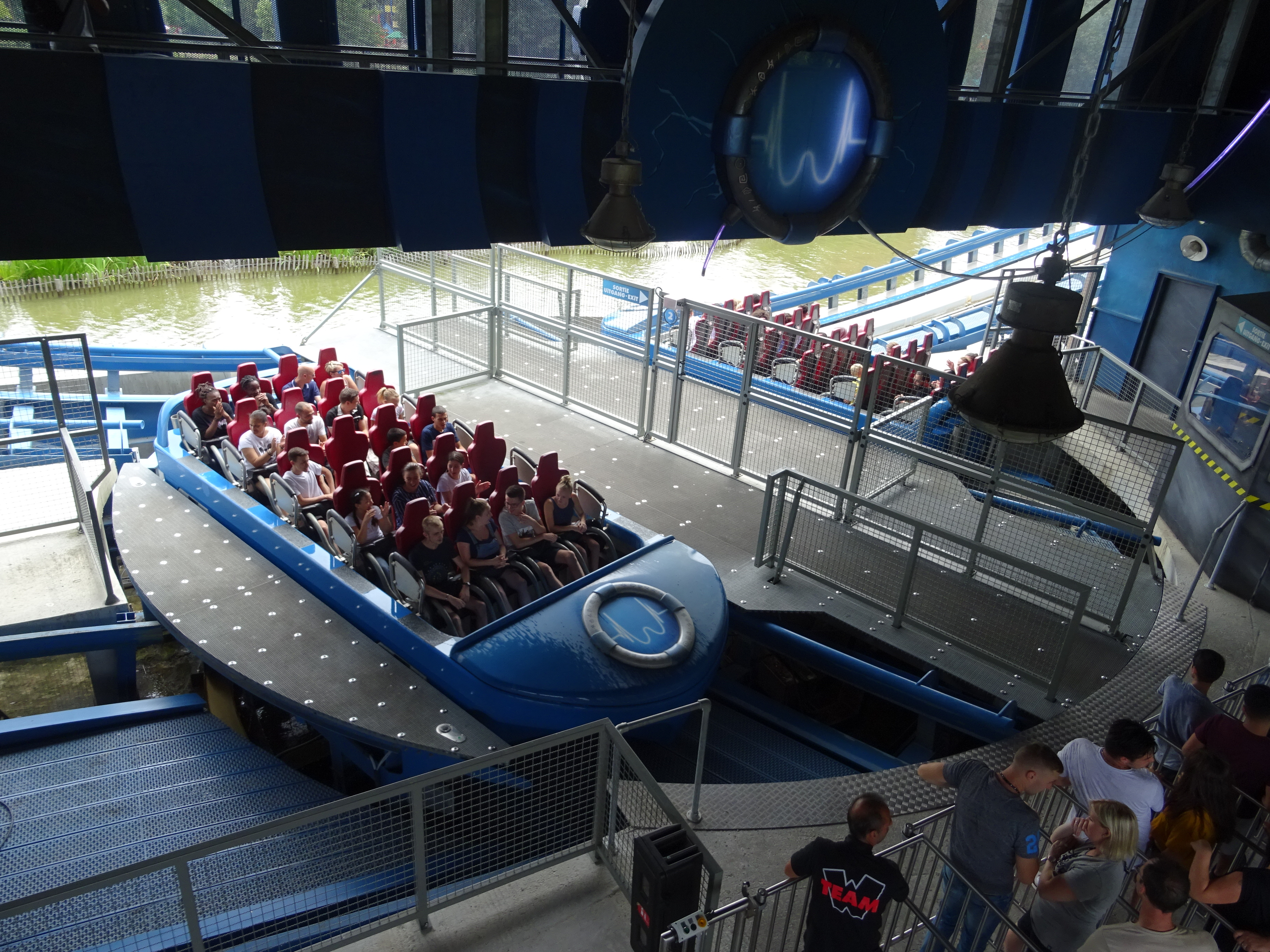
A view of Pulsar's turntable station. While one side of the turntable is lined up with the rest of the track, a vehicle can load riders on the other side.

Pulsar is 45 metres (148 ft) in height, reaches a maximum speed of 101 kilometres per hour (63 mph), and has a track length of 217 metres (712 ft). The ride has two cars, each of which seats 20 riders in 5 rows of 4 riders each. The ride can accommodate a maximum of 960 riders per hour. The ride uses a turntable that enables one vehicle to be loaded while the other is running the course.

=== Ride experience ===
Once riders are loaded, the turntable station rotates to align the car with the rest of the track. The car then accelerates backward over a small hill before traveling through a straight section of track. This straight section of the track goes through the ride's splashdown pool, which at this point in the ride is low enough to allow the vehicle to pass over it. The car then travels part of the way up a vertical spike of the track before traveling forward over the hill. The car then launches forward into a second vertical spike and comes back down before entering a third backward launch. While the car is on the vertical spike at the back end of the ride's layout, the water flows into the splashdown pool in approximately six seconds raising the level. The car then travels down the spike and enters the splashdown pool, which is now filled with water. This serves to slow the car down before it re-enters the turntable to unload riders.
