= Omicron (wasp) =

Scientific classification
- Domain: Eukaryota
- Kingdom: Animalia
- Phylum: Arthropoda
- Class: Insecta
- Order: Hymenoptera
- Family: Vespidae
- Subfamily: Eumeninae
- Genus: Omicron; Saussure, 1855

Type species
- *Omicron globicolle (Spinosa, 1841)

Species
- Omicron acapulcense; Omicron aequale; Omicron aggressor; Omicron aurantiopictum; Omicron auropilosum; Omicron aviculum; Omicron belti; Omicron bonariense; Omicron conclamatum; Omicron criticum; Omicron deminutum; Omicron deplanatum; Omicron elephas; Omicron flavonigrum; Omicron foxi; Omicron furiosum; Omicron garrulum; Omicron globicolle; Omicron gondwanianum; Omicron graculum; Omicron gribodoi; Omicron histrionicum; Omicron lacerum; Omicron lubricum; Omicron lustratum; Omicron microscopicum; Omicron minutum; Omicron nanum; Omicron notabile; Omicron nymphale; Omicron opifex; Omicron paranymphus; Omicron paraspegazzinii; Omicron procellosum; Omicron propodeale; Omicron reguloide; Omicron regulum; Omicron reliquum; Omicron rubefactum; Omicron rubellulum; Omicron ruficolle; Omicron rufiscutum; Omicron rusticum; Omicron spegazzinii; Omicron splendens; Omicron tegulare; Omicron thoracicum; Omicron totonacum; Omicron tuberculatum; Omicron vexatum; Omicron ypsilon

Genus of wasps

Omicron is a quite diverse Neotropical genus of small potter wasps.
