= Omicron Hill =

Coordinates: 69°23′00″N 160°12′03″W

Omicron Hill (elevation: 981 feet (299 m)) is a summit in North Slope Borough, Alaska, in the United States.

Omicron Hill took its name from a surveyor's triangulation station atop the summit.
