= Thunder Dolphin =

Steel roller coaster in Tokyo, Japan

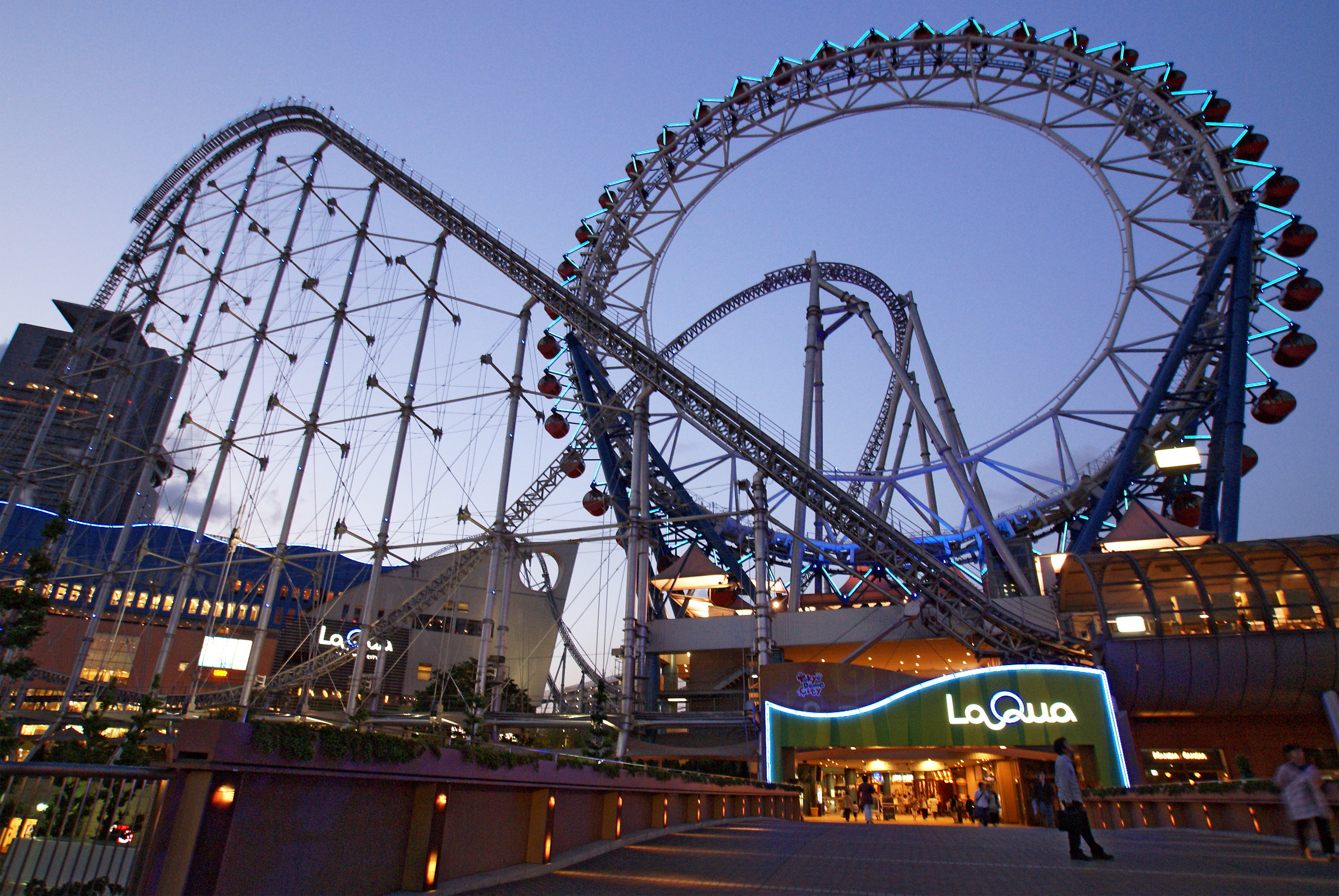
- Thunder Dolphin's lift hill

Tokyo Dome City Attractions
- Location: Tokyo Dome City Attractions
- Park section: LaQua
- Coordinates: 35°42′23″N 139°45′12″E
- Status: Operating
- Opening date: May 1, 2003
- Cost: $37,000,000

General statistics
- Type: Steel
- Manufacturer: Intamin
- Designer: Werner Stengel
- Model: Mega Coaster
- Lift/launch system: Cable lift hill
- Height: 80 m (260 ft)
- Drop: 66 m (217 ft)
- Length: 1,066 m (3,497 ft)
- Speed: 130 km/h (81 mph)
- Inversions: 0
- Duration: 1:30
- Max vertical angle: 80°
- Capacity: 1,660 riders per hour
- G-force: 4.4
- Height restriction: 130 cm (4 ft 3 in)
- Trains: Unknown number of trains with 5 cars; riders arranged 2 across in 2 rows for a total of 20 riders per train
- Thunder Dolphin at RCDB

Thunder Dolphin (サンダードルフィン) is a steel roller coaster at the Tokyo Dome City Attractions amusement park, which is part of Tokyo Dome City in Tokyo, Japan. The ride was designed and constructed by Intamin. At 80 metres (262.5 ft) tall, Thunder Dolphin is one of the tallest continuous circuit roller coasters in the world, currently ranked number 10. Following an incident in which a 25 centimetres (9.8 in) long bolt fell from the ride while in motion on 5 December 2010, injuring a nine-year-old visitor, operation of the ride was suspended until 1 August 2013, when the ride reopened.

Thunder Dolphin's 1,066.8 metres (3,500 ft) long course passes through both a hole in the LaQua building, and through the Big-O, the world's first centerless Ferris wheel. Thunder Dolphin has a maximum speed of 130 kilometres per hour (81 mph).

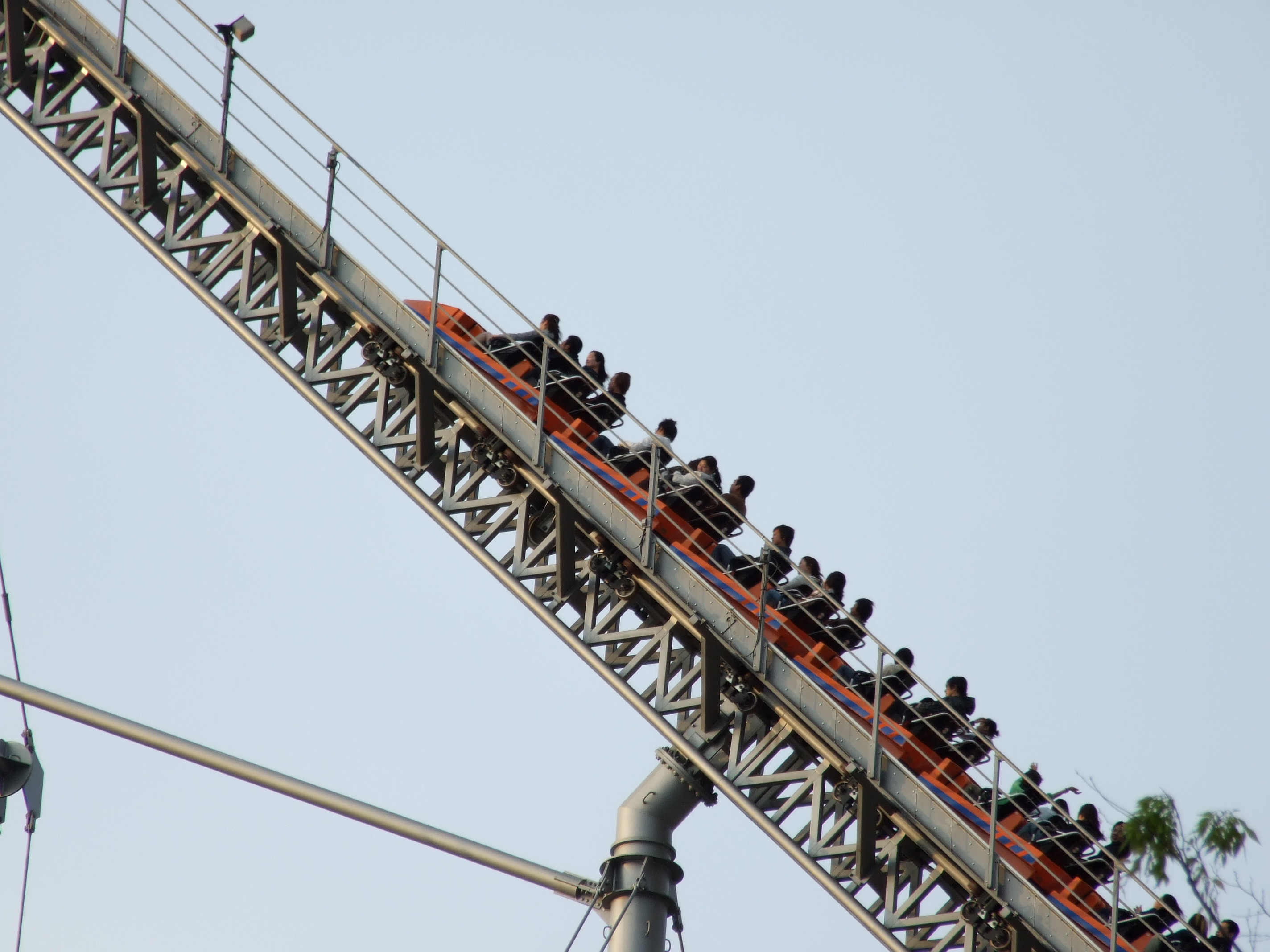
An ascending train at Thunder Dolphin
