= Aqualibi =

Water park in Belgium

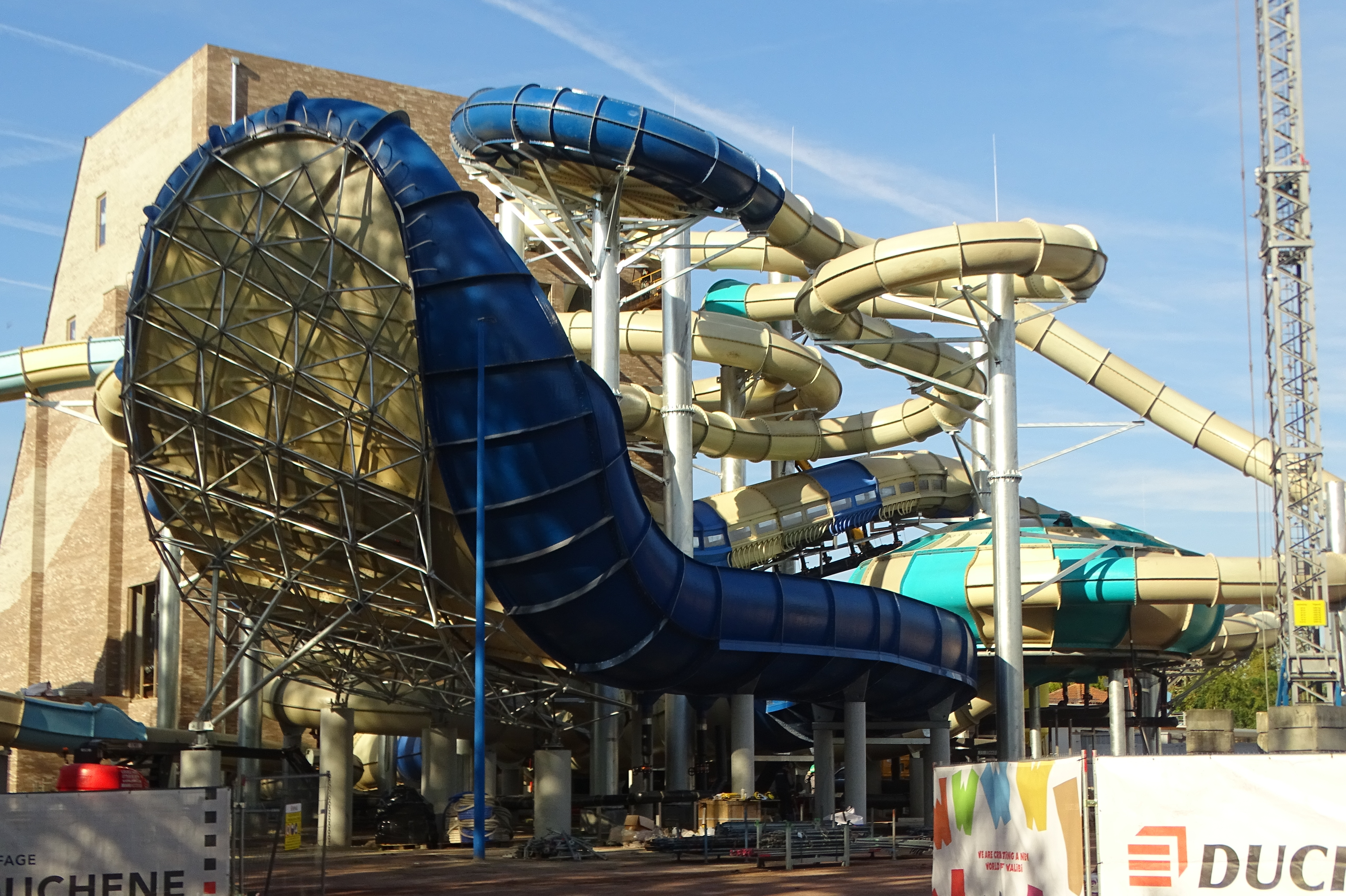
- Some slides seen from outside
- Interactive map of Aqualibi
- Location: Wavre, Belgium
- Coordinates: 50.705°N 4.586°E
- Status: Operating
- Opened: 1987
- Owner: Compagnie des Alpes
- Operated by: Walibi Belgium
- Theme: Tropical
- Area: 8,000 m²

Aqualibi is an indoor water park located in Wavre, Belgium, adjacent to the amusement park Walibi Belgium. Open year-round, Aqualibi offers a range of water attractions for visitors of all ages.

== History ==
Aqualibi opened in 1987 as part of the Walibi Belgium entertainment complex. The park was designed to provide a weather-independent aquatic experience in a tropical-themed setting. In 2011, Aqualibi underwent a major renovation, updating its theming and modernizing infrastructure.

A significant expansion was completed in December 2023, introducing four new water slides and expanding the park’s footprint to nearly 8,000 square meters. This €30 million investment aimed to enhance the park's attractions and sustainability efforts, including energy renovations and improved insulation.

== Attractions ==
Several slides and features disappeared over the years, with some news installed.

=== 2023 introduced slides ===
Slides introduced after its 2023 expansion:

- Banzai – A high-speed, two-person tube slide.
- Pomakai – A funnel-style slide with a steep final drop.
- Waikiki – A slide with wave-like features, reaching up to 18 meters in height.
- Wiki Wiki – A mat racing slide designed for side-by-side competition.

=== Other features ===
- Wave Pool – Simulates ocean waves for general play.
- Rapido – A wild river with twists and strong water currents.
- Jacuzzis – Hot tubs available for relaxation.
- Children’s Areas – Two zones with age-appropriate slides and water features.

== Location and Access ==
The park is located at Boulevard de l’Europe 100, 1300 Wavre, Belgium. It is reachable by car and public transport. The Bierges-Walibi railway station is approximately 150 metres (490 ft) from the entrance.

== Ticketing ==
Admission prices start are €13.50 for under 1.20m and €35 for over 1.20 metres. Annual passes and combination tickets with Walibi Belgium are available. Group rates and school visits are available.

== See also ==
- Walibi Belgium
- List of water parks
