= Walibi Belgium =

Theme park in Wavre, Belgium

- Previously known as Walibi (1975-1981); Walibi Wavre (1982-2000); Six Flags Belgium (2001-2004)
- Interactive map of Walibi Belgium
- Location: Wavre, Walloon Brabant, Belgium
- Coordinates: 50°41′55″N 4°35′26″E
- Opened: 26 July 1975
- Owner: Compagnie des Alpes

Attractions
- Total: ±50
- Roller coasters: 10
- Water rides: 3
- Website: www.walibi.be/en

Walibi Belgium is a 64-hectare (160-acre) theme park located in Wavre, Walloon Brabant, Wallonia, Belgium, close to the city of Brussels. The park complex consists of the titular theme park and the Aqualibi indoor water park that is located next door. It is one of the largest theme parks in Belgium; with roughly 1.45 million visitors attending in 2018.

Initially established by entrepreneur Eddy Meeùs in 1975, Walibi expanded into a chain of six amusement parks located across Belgium, France, and the Netherlands. The park spent a brief period in the 2000s under the Six Flags brand following Walibi's sale to the American-based theme park operator, but was reverted after being sold to Palamon Capital Partners and eventually its current owners Compagnie des Alpes.

== History ==
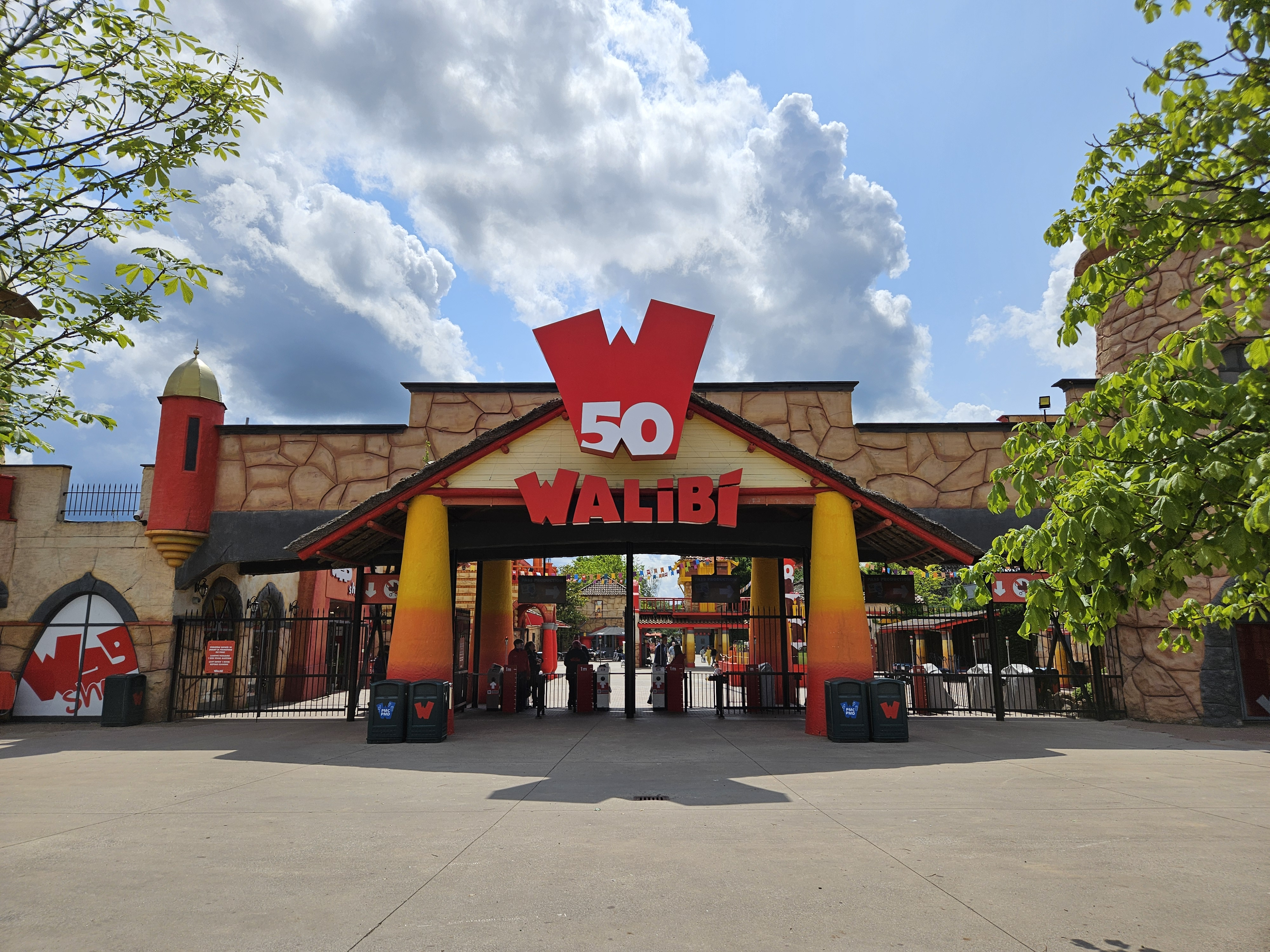
Entrance of Walibi Belgium

The park originally opened on 26 July 1975 by entrepreneur Eddy Meeùs. The park's name; "Walibi", is an abbreviated play-on-words of three local districts within the province of Walloon Brabant near where the park sits - Wavre, Limal, and Bierges. A Wallaby (a macropod cousin of the kangaroo), which became Walibi, was used as the mascot of the park to fit in with its name. The park opened with children's attractions that were themed to the Belgian comic franchise Tintin, including The Secret of the Unicorn and Tintin in the Jungle, of which the park held the license until the end of 1995. The park also opened with a water skiing section which remained until 1994.

An indoor water park, Aqualibi, opened next door to the park in 1987.

=== Six Flags Belgium ===
In December 1997, with an interest to enter the European market and to compete with rival Disneyland Paris, the US-based Premier Parks (later Six Flags) announced that they would purchase a controlling stake in the Walibi Group from Eddy Meeùs. For 1998, the park opened up a new themed area based on the Lucky Luke franchise entitled "Lucky Luke City" which contained the world's largest drop tower attraction; entitled "Dalton Terror". The addition of the area marked the last new addition to the park under Meeùs' control. For 1999, Premier added three new attractions to the park intending to make it the flagship of Six Flags' European operations.

Shortly after Premier rebranded under the Six Flags name, plans were put into place for the park potentially being rebranded under the Six Flags umbrella. On December 29, 2000, Six Flags officially announced that the park would be renamed as Six Flags Belgium. with the park's official renaming was put into place in January. The relaunch of the park would coincide with over $30 million worth of investments and changes with the most major being the addition of Warner Bros. properties into the park, including attractions based on Looney Tunes and DC Comics characters; while Walibi would be replaced with Bugs Bunny as the park's new mascot. Despite the Americanisation of the park, the Belgian-based Lucky Luke would remain. The rebranding of the park was put in place after sister park Walibi Flevo's rebranding as Six Flags Holland led to a heavy boost in attendance. The park officially reopened under its new name on 28 April, after a delay from its originally intended opening of 8 April. On 24 November 2001, Eddy Meeùs died at the age of 76.

=== StarParks/Grévin & Cie ===
Following financial difficulties and other issues, Six Flags announced the sale of their European Parks division to an undisclosed buyer on 15 March 2004. The purchaser was later revealed to be the London-based Palamon Capital Partners, who rebranded the chain as StarParks. The Warner Bros. license was not included in the sale. On April 16, Palamon announced that the park would rebrand back under the Walibi name for the 2005 season, following a fan-cast polling vote. At the end of the park's 2004 season on 7 November, it was announced that Six Flags Belgium would become Walibi Belgium upon the start of the park's 2005 season on 26 March, while Walibi would return as the park's mascot (although he had a semi-return at Aqualibi near the end of 2003; having been on a four year "world tour" and being handed back the keys to the park from Bugs Bunny. A newly introduced group of characters (deemed his "world tour" friends) and a female counterpart named Walibelle were also introduced as part of the park's new storyline. These characters would appear in Walibi Folies, which would rebrand from Bugs Bunny Land, while the 3D cinema would replace the Looney Tunes show with SpongeBob SquarePants 4-D. Walibi's promotions director Dominique Fallon had proclaimed that former owner Eddy Meeùs had cited the Six Flags rebranding as a "mistake".

In March 2006, Palamon Capital Partners sold the Walibi chain, including Walibi Belgium, to Grévin & Cie, a subsidiary of Compagnie des Alpes. This was done for Palamon to focus its operations solely on sister park Movie Park Germany.

From 2012 to 2014, the Aqualibi waterpark underwent a major refurbishment, costing €11 million (US$16 million).

In March 2014, the park's license for Lucky Luke was not renewed.

== Rides ==
=== Present rides ===
==== Roller coasters ====
Name	Photo	Model	Year opened	Manufacturer	Area
Turbine (formerly Sirocco & Psyké Underground)		Shuttle Loop	1982	Schwarzkopf	Dock World
Calamity Mine		Mine Train	1992	Vekoma	Adventure World
Vampire		Suspended Looping Coaster	1999	Vekoma	Loup Garou Zone
Cobra		Boomerang	2001	Vekoma	Karma World
Loup Garou		Wooden roller coaster	2001	Vekoma	Loup Garou Zone
Pulsar		Power Splash	2016	Mack Rides	Dock World
Tiki-Waka		Bobsled Coaster	2018	Gerstlauer	Exotic World
Fun Pilot		Force 190	2019	Zierer	Fun World
Kondaa		Megacoaster	2021	Intamin	Exotic World
Mecalodon		Launch Coaster	2025	Gerstlauer	Dock World

==== Water rides ====
Name	Model	Photo	Year opened	Manufacturer	Area
Radja River	River rafting ride		1988	Intamin	Karma World
Flash-Back	Log flume		1995	MACK Rides	Dock World

==== Thrill rides ====
Name	Type	Photo	Year opened	Manufacturer	Area
Dalton Terror	Drop tower		1998	Intamin	Adventure World
Buzzsaw	Top Spin		2001	HUSS Rides	Adventure World

==== Family attractions ====
Name	Type	Photo	Year opened	Manufacturer	Area
Grand Carrousel	Carousel		1990	Euro Sujets	Loup Garou Zone
Melody Road	Vintage car ride		1979	Mack Rides	Loup Garou Zone
Octopus	Wipeout		2000	Chance Rides	Exotic World
Palais du Génie	Mad House		2001	Vekoma	Karma World
Silverton	Sidecar XL		2023	Technical Park	Adventure World
Spinning Vibe	Breakdance		2001	HUSS rides	Loup Garou Zone
Tapis Volant	Flying carpet ride		2001	SBF Visa	Karma World
Tiki-Trail	Playground		2018	?	Exotic World
Tous en Boîte	Teacups		2001	Chance Rides	Dock World
W.A.B Cinema 4D	4D Cinema		2005	Sim-Exiwerks	Loup Garou Zone
Wave Swinger	Wave swinger		2001	Zierer	Loup Garou Zone

==== Kids attractions ====
Name	Type	Photo	Year opened	Manufacturer	Area
4x4 Adventure	Convoy		2001	SBF Visa Group	Fun World
Bubble Swirl	Samba Balloon		2001	Zamperla	Fun World
Fun Recorder	Red Baron		?	?	Fun World
Graffiti Shuttle	Crazy Bus		2001	Zamperla	Fun World
Guitar Riff	Mini drop tower		2000	SBF Visa Group	Adventure World
Kids Airlines	Red Baron		2000	ETS Marcel Lutz	Adventure World
Kondaala	Barnstormer		2001	Zamperla	Exotic World
Little Swing	Mini swing ride		2000	SBF Visa Group	Adventure World
Mini Tour	Train ride		2001	Zamperla	Fun World
Poneys	Electric horse riding track		1979	Metallbau Emmeln	Adventure World
Spinning Taxi	Mini teacups		2000	SBF Visa Group	Adventure World
Stormy	Water carousel		1999	Zierer	Dock World
Tchou-Tchou Express	Train ride		1990	Metallbau Emmeln	Adventure World
Tree House	Playground		2001	?	Fun World

==== Dark rides ====
Name	Type	Photo	Year opened	Manufacturer	Area
Challenge Of Tutankhamon	Interactive darkride		2003	Sally Corporation	Exotic World
Popcorn Revenge	Interactive darkride		2019	ETF Ride Systems	Karma World

=== Former attractions ===
==== Roller coasters ====
Name	Type	Photo	Year opened	Year closed	Manufacturer
Coccinelle	Tivoli		1999	2017	Zierer
Grand 8	Zyklon Z47		1975	1983	Pinfari
Jumbo Jet	Jet Star		1978	1991	Schwarzkopf
Tornado	Corkscrew with Bayerncurve		1979	2002	Vekoma
Vertigo	Mountain Glider		2007	2008	Doppelmayr

==== Other attractions ====
Name	Type	Photo	Year opened	Year closed	Manufacturer
Big Yoyo	Paratower		1981	1998	Vekoma
Bounty	Looping Starship		1993	2002	Intamin
Gold River Adventure	Tow boat ride		1978	2023	Intamin
Grand Prix Go Karting	Go-karts		2004	2008	?
Inferno	Enterprise		1975	2010	HUSS Rides
La Grande Roue	Ferris wheel		1979	2016	Vekoma
Le Palais d'Ali Baba	Water dark ride		1985	2001	?
Le Secret de La Licorne	Water dark ride		1980	1995	?
MusicXpress	Miniature railway		1995	2017	Severn Lamb
Rio Grande	Log flume		1978	1994	?
Rio Salto	Log flume		1986	1990	?
Sky Diver	Skydiver		2004	2006	Funtime
Teleski	Cable water ski		1975	1994	?
Tuf Tuf Club	Bumper Cars		2001	2023	Reverchon
Turbo Lift	Tri Star		1978	1984	HUSS Rides
Walibi's Secret	Funhouse		2014	2016	JoraVision

== Events ==
=== Summer Nights ===
During 5 Saturdays in a row in July and August, Walibi Belgium has their late night openings. During those nights, the park remains open until 11:00 p.m. and offers additional entertainment. Each night ends with a firework show around the lake, sometimes with a themed show.

=== Halloween ===
One of the events the park is known for is Halloween, traditionally during the last weekends of October and autumn holiday in Belgium. During Halloween, Walibi Belgium transforms into hell on earth with scary entertainment and other festivities. The park started celebrating Halloween in 2000 on a small scale, leading it to be one of the biggest Halloween events in Belgium, the Netherlands and Luxembourg.

Since 2008, Walibi Belgium introduced a storyline around the event which is still running in 2013. Every year, the story has an open ending, making visitors curious for the following year. This happens during a finale show, including special effects, music and actors. The park also creates scare-zones, zones in the park that get a Halloween theme. The park is also known for their number of haunted houses during Halloween. For 2012 and 2013, guests were welcomed in 6 different haunted houses spread over the park. The haunted houses the park offers are nowadays known for their often strange locations and aggressive and violent actors.

For 4 to 5 days, the park also has Halloween nights, with the park staying open until 10 p.m. nightly.

== Transport ==
Bierges-Walibi railway station is in proximity.

== See also ==
- Bellewaerde
- Walibi Holland
- Walibi Rhône-Alpes
