= Big O (Ferris wheel) =

Ferris wheel in Tokyo, Japan

Coordinates: 35.7060725°N 139.7539151°E

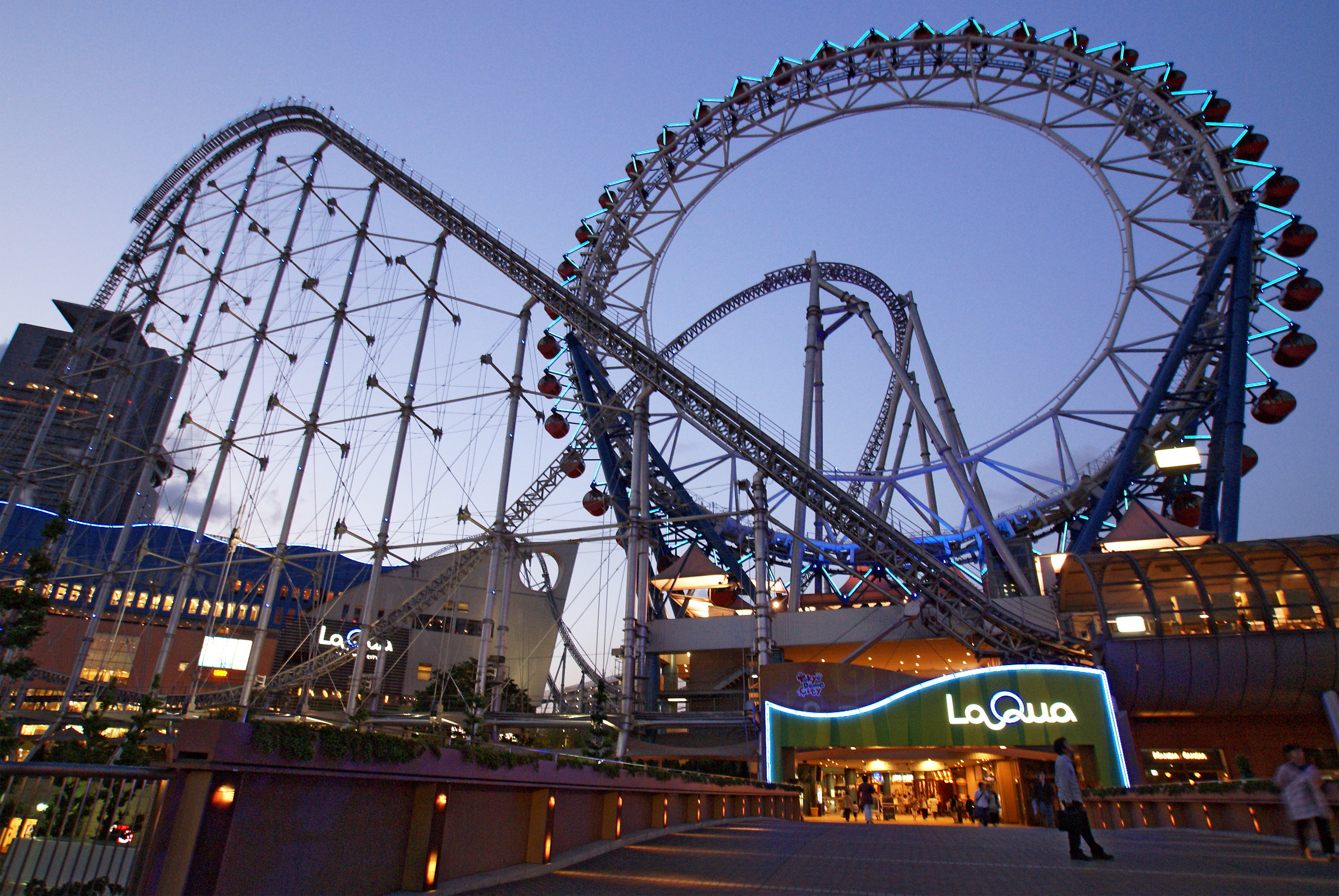
Big O

Big O (ビッグ・オー, Biggu ō) is a centerless non-rotating Ferris wheel at Tokyo Dome City in Bunkyo, Tokyo, Japan. Big O has a diameter of 60 metres (200 ft) and a total height of 80 metres (260 ft). Tokyo's largest roller coaster, the 130-kilometre-per-hour (81 mph) Thunder Dolphin, passes through the centre of the wheel.

Big O was constructed by Mitsubishi Heavy Industries. Construction was completed in March 2003, and the ferris wheel was opened to the public in May 2003. Big O was listed as the world's first centerless Ferris wheel by Guinness World Records.

A rotation around the wheel takes fifteen minutes. Each gondola can seat four passengers. Joysound karaoke machines were added to eight of its forty gondolas in August 2017, and by 2025, the remainder of the gondolas were retrofitted with karaoke machines.
