= Six Flags (1961–2024) =

American amusement park company

Six Flags Entertainment Corporation
- The 2019–2024 corporate logo is still used by the current Six Flags company.

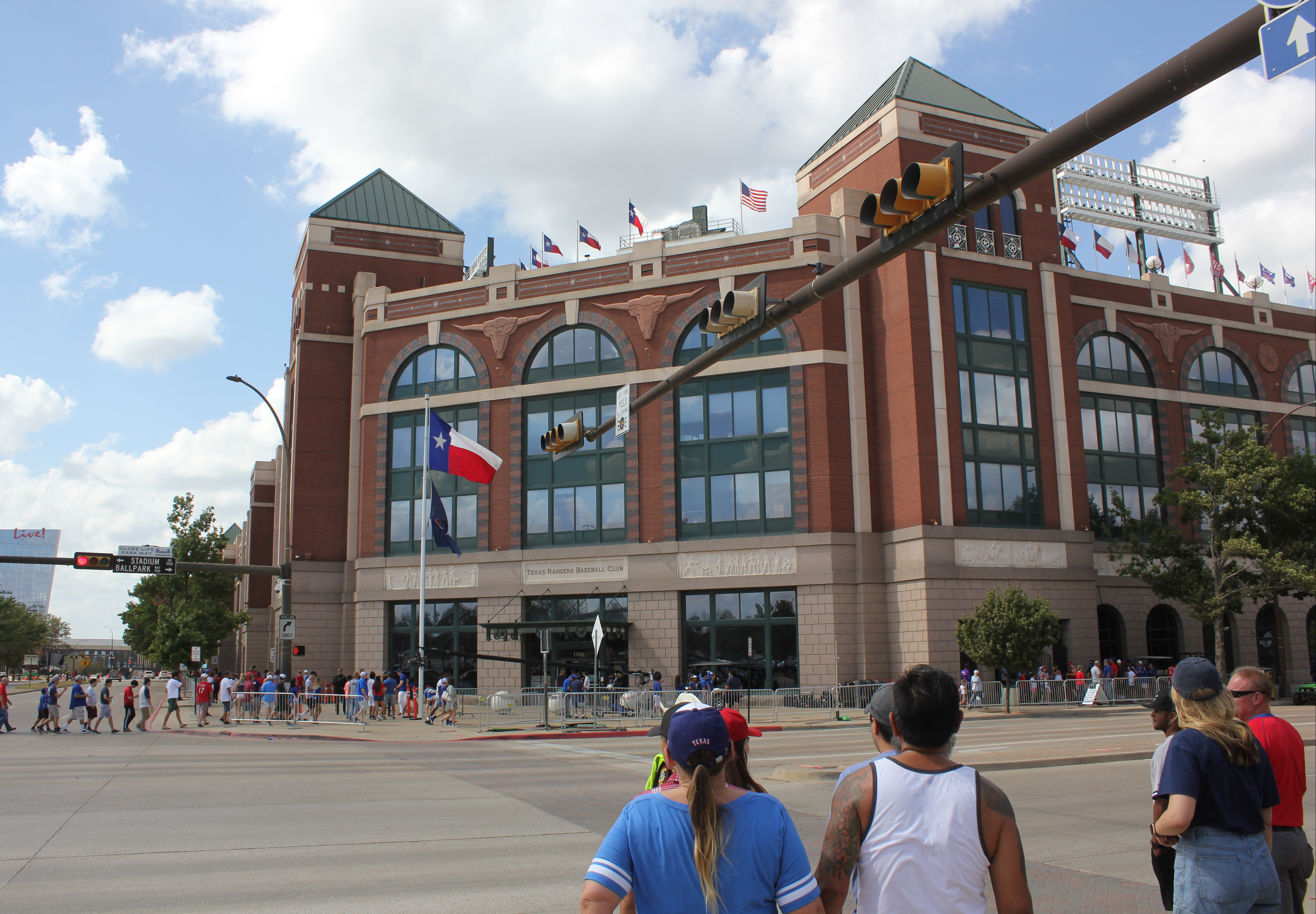
- Headquarters at the Choctaw Stadium in Arlington, Texas
- Formerly: Tierco Group, Inc. (1971–1994); Premier Parks, Inc. (1994–2000); Six Flags, Inc. (2000–2010)
- Type: Public
- Traded as: NYSE: SIX; S&P 600 component
- Industry: Theme parks
- Predecessor: Six Flags Theme Parks
- Founded: 1961; 65 years ago (original company); 1971; 55 years ago
- Founder: Angus G. Wynne
- Defunct: July 1, 2024; 2 years ago
- Fate: Merged with Cedar Fair
- Successor: Six Flags (2024)
- Headquarters: Arlington, Texas, U.S.
- Number of locations: 27 (2024)
- Area served: United States; Mexico; Canada
- Key people: Selim Bassoul (CEO, 2021–2024)
- Brands: Hurricane Harbor; Six Flags; White Water
- Revenue: ▲US$1.43 billion (2023)
- Operating income: ▼US$0.29 billion (2023)
- Net income: ▼US$0.39 billion (2023)
- Total assets: ▲US$2.71 billion (2023)
- Number of employees: 42,350 (2023)
- Website: www.sixflags.com (2024 pre-merger archive)
- Footnotes; Financials for fiscal year ended December 31, 2023, prior to merger completion. (Note: 2023 employee count consists of approximately 41,000 part-time employees and 1,350 full-time employees)

Six Flags Entertainment Corporation (formerly Tierco Group, Inc., Premier Parks, Inc., and Six Flags Inc.) was an American multinational amusement park corporation, headquartered in Arlington, Texas, United States. Before its 2024 merger with Cedar Fair, it had 27 properties in its portfolio. These included 15 amusement parks and 11 water parks in the United States, Canada, and Mexico. In 2019, Six Flags properties hosted 32.8 million customers, the seventh-highest attendance in the world.

Founded in the 1960s and named for its first theme park, Six Flags Over Texas, the original company operated as Six Flags, Corp., and later Six Flags Theme Parks, Inc. From 1993 to 1998, Time Warner owned the company before selling it to Premier Parks, which absorbed the original company. Premier Parks adopted the Six Flags name after the acquisition. On June 13, 2009, the corporation filed for Chapter 11 bankruptcy protection, which it exited after corporate restructuring on May 3, 2010.

In November 2023, Six Flags and Cedar Fair announced they would merge in a deal valued at US$8 billion. Both companies were dissolved and a new entity founded: Six Flags Entertainment Corporation, of which Six Flags shareholders received a 48.8% minority stake. The merger was finalized on July 1, 2024, at which time the combined company operated 42 properties.

== Original Six Flags company (1961–1998) ==
=== Origin ===
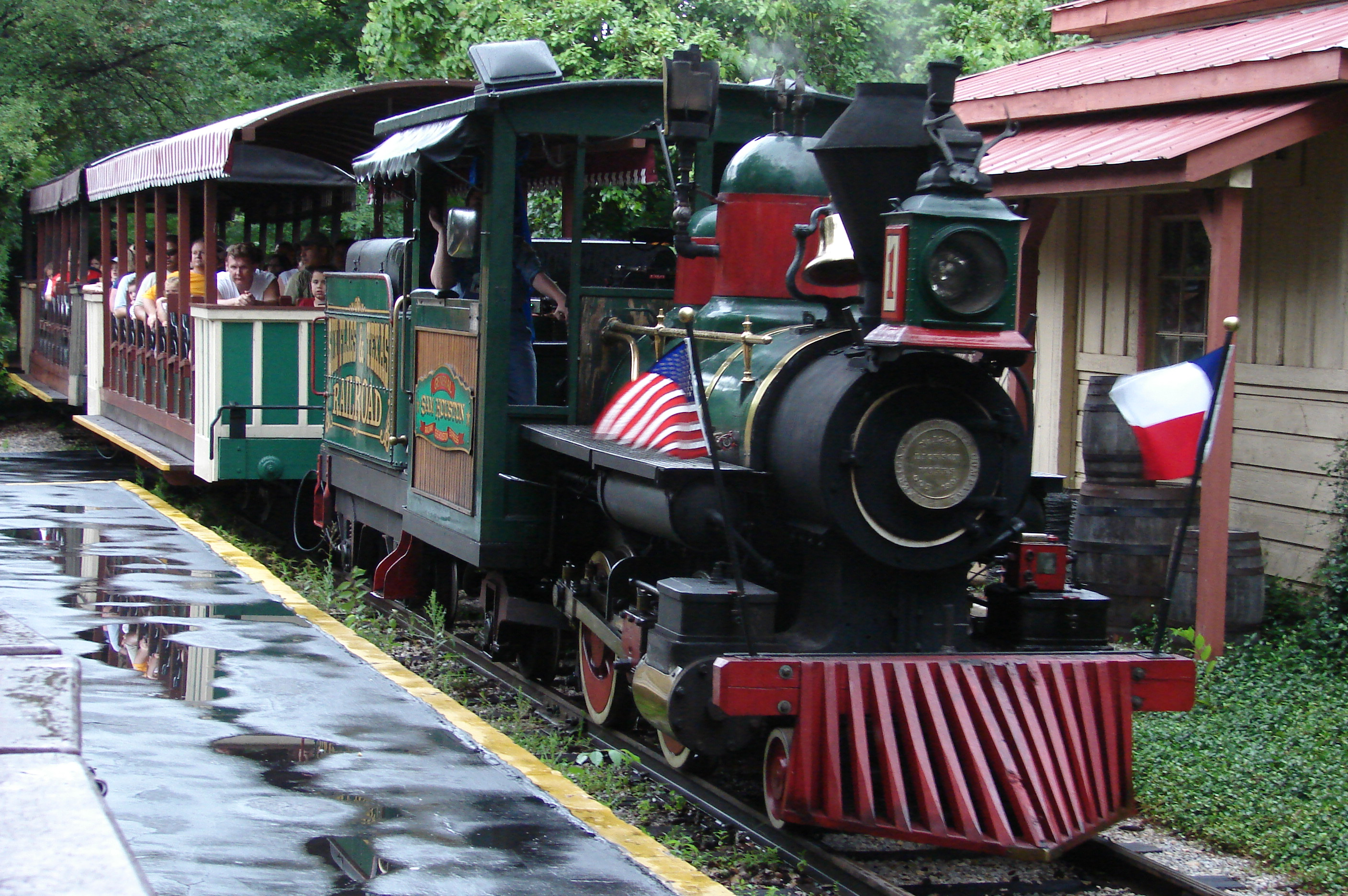
The Six Flags & Texas Railroad at Six Flags Over Texas (2007)

In 1957, real estate businessman Angus G. Wynne and other investors created The Great Southwest Corporation, which in 1960 began building its first theme park in Arlington, Texas, between Dallas and Fort Worth. They named it Six Flags Over Texas, a reference to the six nations that have governed Texas: Spain, France, Mexico, the Republic of Texas, the United States of America, and the Confederate States of America. The park opened the following year for a short, 45-day season.

Six Flags Over Texas initially featured a Native American village, a gondola ride, a railroad, some Wild West shows, a stagecoach ride and "Skull Island", a pirate-themed adventure attraction. There was also "LaSalle's River Adventure", inspired by the late-1600s La Salle Expeditions, that carried customers on French riverboats through a wilderness of animated puppets. Over the years, all of those attractions, except the railroad, were replaced by others, such as roller coasters, swing rides, log flumes and shoot-the-chute rides, as well as an observation tower.

=== Growth and acquisitions ===
In 1964, Angus Wynne's uncle Toddie Lee Wynne announced he would sell his stake in the Great Southwest Corporation, a sale valued around $6 million. The Pennsylvania Railroad purchased 500,000 shares of the company, a controlling interest, as part of its effort to diversify its revenue sources.

The railroad merged with the New York Central Railroad to form Penn Central in 1968 and went bankrupt two years later; still it bankrolled geographic expansion and additions for its Six Flags parks. The company opened Six Flags Over Georgia in 1967 and Six Flags Over Mid-America in 1971. Those were the last two parks built by Six Flags, which continued to grow by acquiring independent parks. Six Flags purchased AstroWorld in Houston, Texas, in 1975; Great Adventure in Jackson, New Jersey, in 1977; and Magic Mountain in Valencia, California, in 1979.

In 1982, Penn Central—which had sold its railroad assets to Conrail and now consisted largely of its diversified sub-firms—sold the company to Bally Manufacturing. Under Bally's ownership, the company began to develop Urban Entertainment Center projects which were intended to supplement its larger amusement parks. Three of these projects were completed, all of them short-lived: AutoWorld in Flint, Michigan, which opened in 1984 and closed in 1985; Six Flags Power Plant in Baltimore, which opened in 1985 and closed in 1987; and the SS Admiral riverboat in St. Louis, which opened in 1987 and was shut down later that year.

In 1984, Six Flags bought the Great America theme park in Gurnee, Illinois, from the Marriott hotel chain. That deal also included the rights to use Warner Bros.' Looney Tunes animated characters in Six Flags properties.

Three years later, Bally surrendered control of the chain to Wesray Capital Corporation in a 1987 leveraged buyout. Time Warner quickly began to gain more company stock, gaining a 19.5% stake in Six Flags in 1990 and then 50% in 1991, with the remaining shares of the company being split by Blackstone Group and Wertheim Schroder & Company. Time Warner purchased the remaining stake in Six Flags in 1993, changing the company's name from Six Flags Corp. to Six Flags Theme Parks, Inc. In 1995, to reduce its debt, Time Warner sold 51% of Six Flags for $200 million in cash to an investment group led by Boston Ventures, shifting $800 million in debt to Six Flags.

In 1996, Six Flags began to manage Fiesta Texas theme park in San Antonio, Texas, with a ten-year option to buy.

== Premier Parks era and Six Flags rebranding (1998–2024) ==
=== Premier Parks ===
Premier Parks, Inc. was an amusement park operator based in Oklahoma City, Oklahoma. They were founded in 1971 as Tierco Group, Inc., and initially operated as a real estate company. They acquired Frontier City for $1.2 million in 1982, planning to demolish the park and build a shopping center in its place, but the oil bust in Oklahoma caused developers to lose interest. Instead, Tierco hired Gary Story as general manager of Frontier City in 1984 and spent about $39 million to improve the park. As the new head of Frontier City, he quadrupled the park's attendance and revenues. Under his leadership, two rides, a ticket booth, a sales office, and a petting zoo were added to the park. Food service improved. By 1988, Tierco had fully shifted its strategic direction to the amusement parks market and eventually exited the real estate market, and in 1991 they had acquired the White Water water park from Silver Dollar City, Inc. and renamed it as White Water Bay. Tierco focused on adding rides while making parks family-friendly in order to increase their attendance.

In 1992, Tierco added its second amusement park to its portfolio by acquiring the financially troubled Wild World in Largo, Maryland and spent $500,000 to remodel the park. Tierco treated the park's renovation similarly to Frontier City, where the park's buildings were remodeled and the park's children's ride selection was expanded. The park also saw a name change to Adventure World, having a tropical look and feel. Afterward, Gary Story was promoted to executive vice president of the two parks, and by 1994 he had become president and chief operating officer (COO). Within that year, Adventure World saw two additional roller coasters and more flat rides. Tierco then changed its name to Premier Parks, Inc. afterwards, under Kieran E. Burke, chairman and chief executive officer.

During the second half of the 1990s, Premier Parks underwent a massive "Growth through Acquisition" phase. On August 16, 1995, they acquired Geauga Lake near Cleveland, Ohio, Wyandot Lake in Powell, Ohio and Darien Lake near Buffalo, New York from Funtime, Inc. for $60 million. While Lake Compounce was also included in the purchase, Premier Parks eventually sold it to Kennywood Entertainment Company. Aside from theme park acquisitions, Premier also saw plans to expand their water park offerings by opening water parks for the parks that did not have one.

In June 1996, Premier Parks went public and raised nearly $70 million through an initial offering at $18 per share. The company planned to use the money to expand its parks and acquire others. They began their acquisitions for the year by announcing the purchase of The Great Escape & Splashwater Kingdom in Queensbury, New York for an undisclosed amount on August 27, to close the deal by December. This was followed up with the acquisition of Elitch Gardens in Denver, Colorado on September 25, the Waterworld USA waterparks in Sacramento and Concord, California, as well as Paradise Island Family Fun Park (next to Waterworld USA Sacramento) from FRE Inc. on October 25 and Riverside Park in Agawam, Massachusetts in December.

Premier began operating the Marine World theme park near San Francisco during the Mid-1997 season. On September 26, Kentucky Kingdom (located in Louisville) owner Paul Hart announced that he would sell the park's operation lease to Premier Parks for $64 million, of which the deal would close on November 7. On October 11, Premier became the managing partner for Texas Flags, Ltd., the owners of the Six Flags Over Texas park, and took over its operations. In December, Premier announced that they would enter the European market by purchasing a controlling 94 percent interest in the Walibi Group in Wavre, Belgium. The company owned six park operations – Walibi Wavre/Aqualibi and Bellewaerde Park in Belgium, Walibi Flevo in Holland, and Walibi Aquitaine, Walibi Schtroumpf, and Walibi Rhône-Alpes in France. The purchase was made for Premier to compete with Disneyland Paris and would close in March 1998. Within the 1997 year alone, almost 11 million people visited parks owned by Premier.

=== Sale of Six Flags to Premier Parks ===
On February 10, 1998, Time Warner Entertainment and the investment group announced the sale of their stakes in Six Flags Theme Parks, Inc. to Premier Parks, Inc. for $1.86 billion, forming Premier's largest purchase. The deal closed on April 1. Shortly afterwards in June, Kentucky Kingdom became the first of Premier's owned parks to rebrand under the Six Flags moniker, effectively renamed as Six Flags Kentucky Kingdom. In October, Premier announced that an additional four parks would rebrand under the Six Flags moniker; Elitch Gardens, Darien Lake, The New Marine World and Adventure World. The former three would keep their names alongside the Six Flags suffix, while Adventure World would be completely reinvented and refurbished as Six Flags America. The additions also included the addition of the Warner Bros. IPs to the respective parks and brought the number of Six Flags branded parks to seventeen. On November 18, 1998, Premier announced that they had fully purchased Six Flags Fiesta Texas from USAA, putting the park under their full control.

Aside from that, Premier Parks added additional parks to their portfolio. They purchased Reino Aventura in Mexico City, Mexico for an estimated $59 million in March, White Water Atlanta and its sister park American Adventures in Marietta, Georgia from Silver Dollar City, Inc. on May 5 for an undisclosed amount and SplashTown USA in Spring, Texas on May 17. On October 6, Premier announced the expansion of its North American licensing agreement with Warner Bros. to include rights to the Looney Tunes, Hanna-Barbera, Cartoon Network, and DC Comics characters and franchises in Europe, Latin and South America as well. The deal also allowed Premier to open more theme parks under the Warner Bros. Movie World brand theme parks in these territories. The deal also included the purchase of Warner Bros. Movie World Germany from the company and an agreement to hold a minority stake and manage the upcoming Warner Bros. Movie World Madrid theme park, which was scheduled to open in 2002. The deal did not include the original Warner Bros. Movie World on the Gold Coast, Australia, as that was under completely different ownership.

=== Rebranding of Premier Parks under Six Flags name ===
In their 1999 annual report, Premier Parks announced that they would rebrand under the Six Flags, Inc. name. The company also announced an additional four parks (two in the United States, and two international parks) would rebrand under the Six Flags brand – Geauga Lake becoming Six Flags Ohio, Riverside Park becoming Six Flags New England, Walibi Flevo becoming Six Flags Holland and Reino Aventura becoming Six Flags Mexico. The rebrands of all four parks coincided with the addition of Warner Bros. properties. The corporate name-change occurred on July 5, 2000. In December 2000, Wild Waves and Enchanted Village in Federal Way, Washington was added to the Six Flags family when its owner Jeff Stock sold his shares of the park for $19.3 million.

On January 10, 2001, Six Flags announced that they had reached an agreement with Anheuser-Busch to purchase SeaWorld Ohio for $110 million. The deal would allow Six Flags to merge the former park with Six Flags Ohio alongside its campground properties and nearby hotels to form a massive entertainment complex. After the purchase was completed, the entire complex was rebranded under the name of Six Flags Worlds of Adventure, and was positioned to compete against northern Ohio's Cedar Point. On January 15, Six Flags European Parks announced that they would rebrand Walibi Wavre as Six Flags Belgium for the 2001 season with the addition of the Warner Bros. properties. The rebranding would not apply to water park Aqualibi, which would keep its name. In May 2001, Six Flags expanded to the Canadian market by negotiating a deal with the city of Montreal to operate La Ronde in Montreal, Quebec, Canada. Six Flags acquired the assets of the park with a long-term contract to lease the land from the city.

In April 2002, Warner Bros. Movie World Madrid opened to the public, adding another park to the Six Flags portfolio. The park was constructed as a joint venture between Six Flags, Warner Bros., and the City of Madrid, with Six Flags holding a minority stake and park operations. In August 2002, Six Flags purchased the lease operations to Jazzland in New Orleans for $22 million and rebranded it as Six Flags New Orleans for the 2003 season with the addition of the Warner Bros. properties. For 2003, Walibi Schtroumpf would see a name change to Walibi Lorraine after the contract to use The Smurfs characters was not renewed.

=== Asset sales and shareholder revolt ===
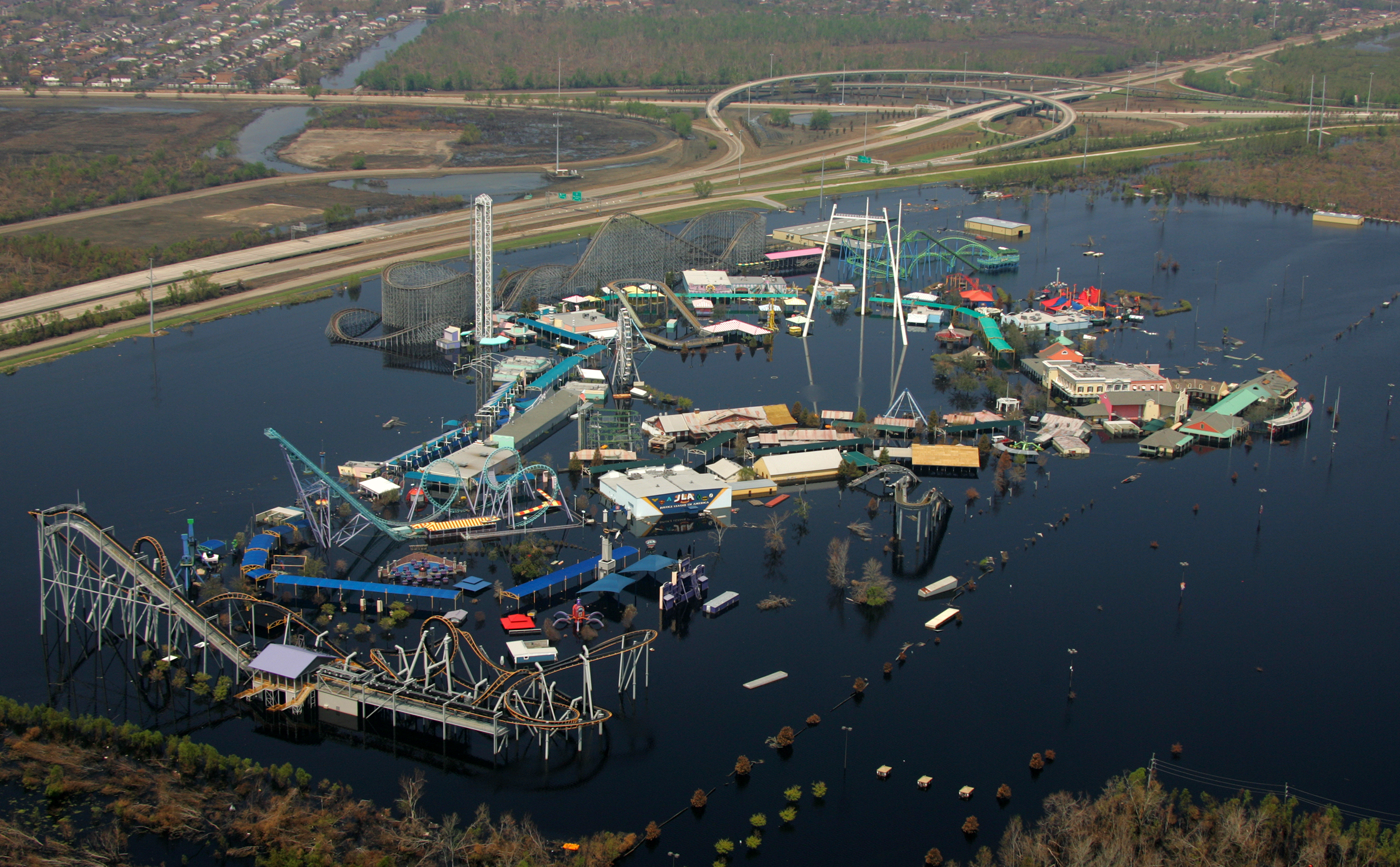
On August 29, 2005, Six Flags New Orleans was severely damaged by Hurricane Katrina, leading to its closure.

In 2004, Six Flags began the process of closing and selling properties to reduce the company's growing debt. On March 10, Six Flags made two major theme park sales. They first announced the sale of Six Flags Worlds of Adventure to Cedar Fair for $145 million, with the deal planned to close before the start of the 2004 operating season. The deal would include the theme park, wildlife, and water park sections, as well as the adjacent hotel and campground while the animals would be relocated to other Six Flags parks, while branding that Cedar Fair did not own licensing rights to like Looney Tunes and DC Comics, would be removed. Cedar Fair confirmed that the park would revert to its original name of Geauga Lake and that they would remove the wildlife section of the park in to focus on other facilities. The other was the sale of the Six Flags European Parks division to an undisclosed partner which was later confirmed to be Palmon Capital Partners. This deal was closed on June 24 with Palmon rebranding the company as StarParks. The Six Flags branded parks in Belgium and Holland reverted to the "Walibi" brand for the 2005 season while Warner Bros. Movie World Germany was rebranded as Movie Park Germany as the Warner Bros. license was not included in the sale. both sales raised $345 million. On November 23, 2004, Six Flags completely left the European market altogether when Warner Bros. Park Madrid's management firms terminated their 99-year operation lease and stake. The park's management took over operations of the park in-house while Warner Bros. acquired Six Flags' minority stake.

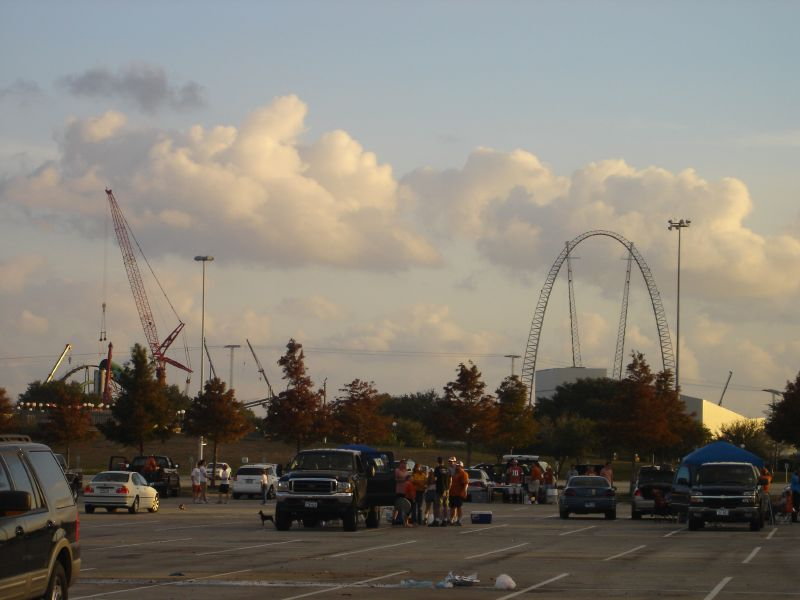
Six Flags AstroWorld was demolished after its closure in 2005.

In 2005, some of the Six Flags's largest investors, notably Bill Gates's Cascade Investments (which then owned about 11% of Six Flags) and Daniel Snyder's Red Zone, LLC (which owned 12%), demanded change. On August 17, 2005, Red Zone began a proxy battle to gain control of the Six Flags board of directors. On August 29, 2005, Six Flags New Orleans was severely damaged by Hurricane Katrina, followed by it sitting abandoned. On September 12, Six Flags Chief Executive Officer Kieran Burke announced that Six Flags AstroWorld would be closed and demolished at the end of the 2005 season. The company cited issues such as the park's performance, and parking issues involving the Houston Texans football team, Reliant Stadium, and the Houston Livestock Show and Rodeo, leveraged with the estimated value of the property which included the park. Company executives were expecting to receive upwards of $150 million for the real estate but ended up receiving $77 million when the bare property (which cost $20 million to clear) was sold to a development corporation in 2006. On November 22, 2005, Red Zone announced it had gained control of the board. Kieran Burke was removed on December 14 and was replaced by former executive vice president of ESPN programming and Red Zone CEO Mark Shapiro. Six Flags then named former Representative Jack Kemp, Miramax co-founder Harvey Weinstein and former president of the Interpublic Group of Companies Incorporated Michael Kassan, to their new board of directors.

On January 27, 2006, the company announced its exit from Oklahoma City by relocating its offices to New York City and putting Frontier City and White Water Bay up for sale. On April 13, they announced that they would terminate their lease to operate Wyandot Lake after the 2006 season and sell the lease back to the neighboring Columbus Zoo and Aquarium. On April 18, Six Flags announced that they would also terminate their lease with the Cal Expo to operate Waterworld Sacramento after the 2006 season. On June 23, they announced to either sell, reduce or close seven additional parks – Six Flags Elitch Gardens, Six Flags Darien Lake, Six Flags Waterworld, Six Flags Splashtown, Wild Waves and Enchanted Village and most notably, Six Flags Magic Mountain.

On January 11, 2007, Six Flags announced that PARC Management would purchase the selection of parks previously put up for sale aside from Six Flags Magic Mountain for $312 million: $275 million cash and a note for $37 million. PARC subsequently sold the parks to CNL Lifestyle Properties in a deal that would allow PARC to manage the parks under a multi-year lease. Parks which had the Six Flags suffix in their name had it removed.

In June 2008, Six Flags leased operations of American Adventures to an independent company – Zuma Holdings LLC.

=== Bankruptcy ===
The company's cash flow had decreased by over $120 million annually during the Shapiro years. In October 2008, Six Flags was warned its stock value had fallen below the required minimums to remain listed on the New York Stock Exchange. With the 2008 financial crisis weighing both on consumer spending and the ability to access credit facilities, Six Flags was believed to be unable to make a payment to preferred stockholders due in August 2009. Management saw the business as a sound one, noting that attendance across the company's parks increased slightly in 2008 compared to 2007. Six Flags CEO Mark Shapiro said that the company's problem was the declining attendance and cash flow created by his new management initiatives. If not resolved, the company warned in its 2008 annual report that the situation might require a Chapter 11 bankruptcy filing, with Six Flags already retaining counsel should that occur. The company stated at the time that it expected business to continue as normal in the event of such a filing, although one analyst believed attendance at the company's parks would decrease by six percent, suggesting parents would be leery of letting their children ride a roller coaster operated by a bankrupt company. In April 2009, the New York Stock Exchange announced it would delist Six Flags' stock on April 20, a decision that the company did not intend to appeal. On June 1, 2009, Six Flags announced it would delay its $15 million debt payment further using a 30-day grace period. Less than two weeks later, on June 13, the firm filed for Chapter 11 bankruptcy protection, but issued a statement that the parks would continue to operate normally while the company restructured. On August 21, 2009, Six Flags' Chapter 11 restructuring plan was announced in which lenders would control 92% of the company in exchange for canceling $1.13 billion in debt.

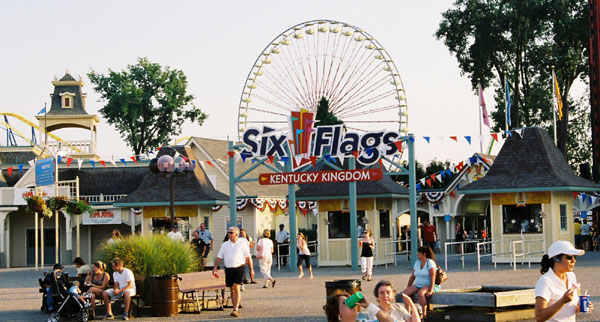
Six Flags closed Kentucky Kingdom in 2010, after failing to negotiate a lease agreement for the park

One component of the restructuring was negotiating a new lease agreement with the Kentucky State Fair Board, which owned much of the land and attractions for Six Flags Kentucky Kingdom. Six Flags had asked to forgo rent payments for the remaining nine years of its current lease agreement in exchange for profit-sharing from the park's operations. When it appeared that the offer had been rejected, Six Flags announced in February 2010 that it would not re-open the park. However, the Kentucky State Fair Board stated at the time that they were still open to negotiating a revised lease agreement. The park later reopened under different management.

On April 28, 2010, the company's bondholders reached an agreement on a reorganization plan. Junior note holders, including hedge funds Stark Investments and Pentwater Capital Management, assumed control of the company, while senior note holders were paid in cash. Despite objections from some parties who stood to gain nothing, the bankruptcy judge approved the plan on April 30, 2010. As part of the settlement, chairman of the board Dan Snyder was removed, while chief executive officer Mark Shapiro briefly remained in his post.

=== Emergence from bankruptcy ===
Six Flags officially emerged from bankruptcy protection as Six Flags Entertainment Corp. on May 3, 2010, and announced plans to issue new stock on the New York Stock Exchange. Amid suspected disagreements regarding the future of the company with the board, Shapiro left the company and Al Weber Jr. was brought in as interim president and CEO. The company announced that several corporate positions as well as the corporate headquarters would be relocated from New York City to Grand Prairie, Texas. The building that served as the new headquarters, was located in the Great Southwest Industrial District and was a converted warehouse that had been in use by Six Flags for office space as well as a corporate operations center. Six Flags kept a portion of the Midtown Manhattan office and currently maintains a presence in New York City at that same location.

=== Post-bankruptcy ===
Six Flags announced that Jim Reid-Anderson would replace Weber and become chairman, president and chief executive officer (CEO) on August 13, 2010. John Duffey also joined the company in 2010, taking the role of chief financial officer (CFO). As of October 1, 2012, Al Weber Jr. had retired as chief operating officer (COO) with no immediate successor.

In late 2010, Six Flags announced as part of their post-bankruptcy cost-cutting measures they would terminate non-Warner Bros. licenses from the parks, leading to attractions and areas based on Thomas the Tank Engine, The Wiggles, Tony Hawk, Evel Knievel, and Terminator being debranded.

On April 10, 2014, Six Flags announced a strategic partnership with Meraas Leisure and Entertainment (now known as DXB Entertainments) to build a Six Flags-branded theme park in Dubai, reviving the project. On June 23, 2014, Six Flags also announced a strategic partnership with Riverside Investment Group to build multiple Six Flags-branded theme parks in China over the decade.

On February 18, 2016, Six Flags announced that Jim Reid-Anderson had been promoted as executive chairman and John M. Duffey succeeded him as president and CEO. On January 11, 2016, Six Flags announced Six Flags Zhejiang, then named Six Flags Haiyan, in China. On the same day, a website was created along with concept art for the property. A month later on February 2, 2016. Six Flags announced Six Flags Hurricane Harbor Oaxtepec. The water park, originally named Parque Acuatico Oaxtepec, is a 76-acre park located in Morelos, Mexico that went bankrupt in 2011. On March 21, 2016, Six Flags announced a partnership with NaVi Entertainment to build a Six Flags-branded theme park and a Six Flags Hurricane Harbor-branded water park in Vietnam. On March 29, 2016, Six Flags announced the revival of its previously canceled Six Flags Dubai. As part of the second phase of the Dubai Parks and Resorts project in Jebel Ali, the park was expected to open in 2019. On July 20, 2016, Six Flags announced an agreement with Riverside Investment Group Co. Ltd. for the development of a second Six Flags-branded theme park in China together with a water park. The two parks will be located in Bishan District, a district of Chongqing.

On April 27, 2017, the company announced it would take over operations of Waterworld California in Concord, California, making it Six Flags' 20th property. On July 18, 2017, Six Flags announced that president and CEO John M. Duffey had retired from the company and Jim Reid-Anderson had re-assumed the roles of chairman, president and CEO. On May 18, 2017, Six Flags and Riverside Group signed an agreement with Paws, Inc. to use Garfield in children's areas in Six Flags-branded theme parks in China.

On March 22, 2018, Six Flags and Riverside Group announced a partnership with Turner Asia Pacific to bring Tuzki and other Turner-owned IPs to its theme parks in China. On May 22, 2018, Six Flags announced the purchase of operating leases for five parks owned by EPR Properties. The parks are Darien Lake, Frontier City, Wet'n'Wild Phoenix, Wet'n'Wild SplashTown and White Water Bay, which were properties Six Flags formerly owned prior to 2007. On October 9, 2018, Six Flags and Rockford Park District announced a lease agreement allowing Six Flags to operate Magic Waters Waterpark beginning Spring 2019. On October 24, 2018, Six Flags announced that the future of its Six Flags Dubai theme park was "uncertain" following losses at the company and its partner DXB Entertainments.

On April 24, 2019, DXB Entertainments canceled Six Flags Dubai, stating that the development and establishment of a Six Flags theme park was not in the best interest of the company or its shareholders. Plans were made to direct the available proceeds to enhance the existing theme parks of Motiongate and Bollywood Parks. On October 2, 2019, Reuters reported that Six Flags Entertainment Corporation had approached competitor Cedar Fair with an acquisition offer. Sources said that Cedar Fair was considering Six Flags' cash-and-stock offer, but there was no certainty that a deal would be reached. On October 4, 2019, Cedar Fair rejected Six Flags' offer to purchase. On October 24, 2019, Six Flags Entertainment Corporation announced that Jim Reid-Anderson would retire and Mike Spanos would be president and CEO of the company on November 18, 2019.

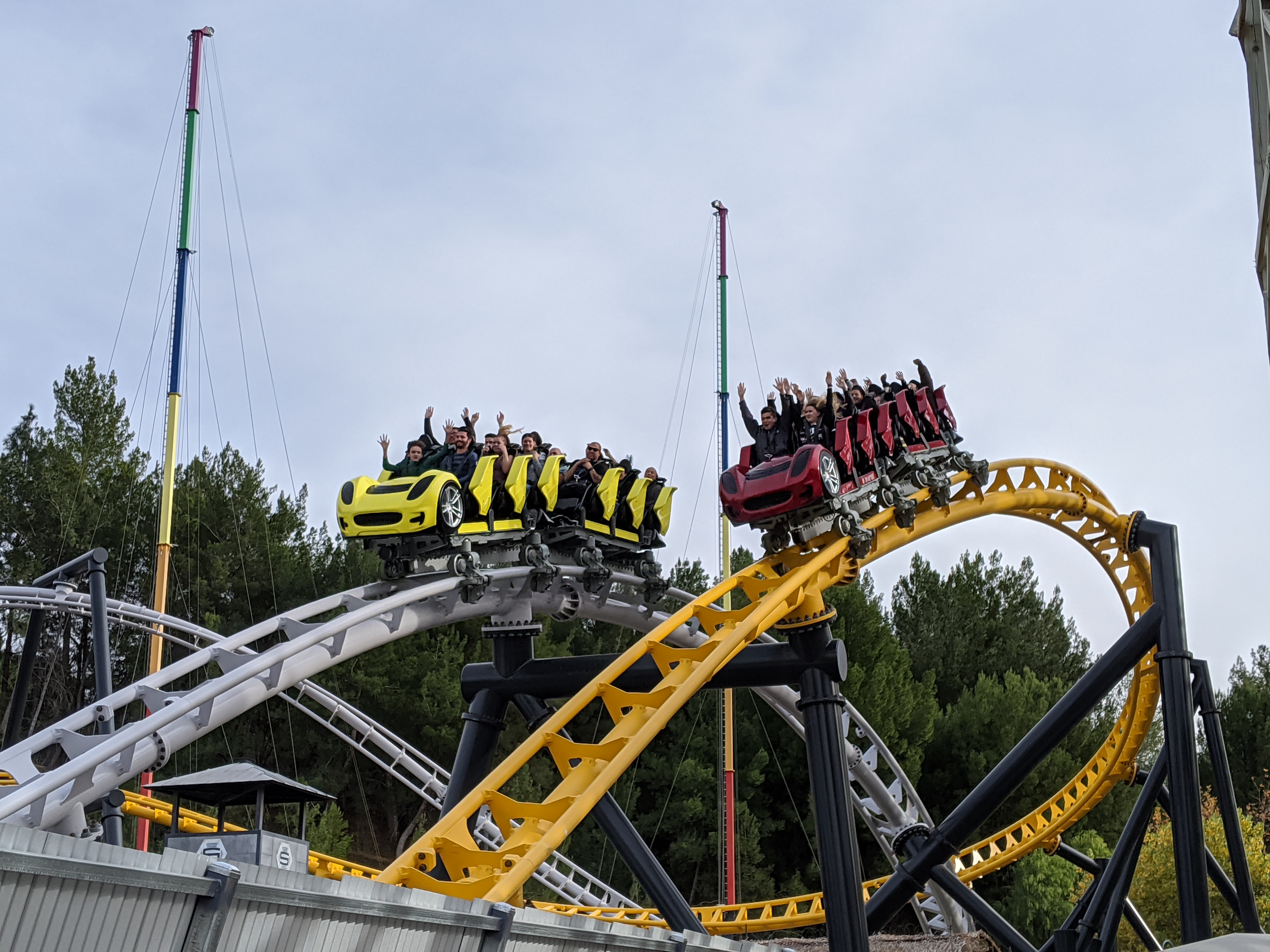
West Coast Racers opened on January 9, 2020.

On January 10, 2020, Six Flags indicated that its projects in China have not progressed as expected and could be canceled due to debt problems with its partner Riverside Investment Group. In January 2020, Six Flags finalized plans to move its corporate headquarters to the Centerfield Office Building at Globe Life Park in Arlington, Texas. The offices were remodeled over the summer and Six Flags personnel moved in during the last few months of the year. On March 13, 2020, with only a few parks already opened for the 2020 season, Six Flags announced that all its properties would suspend operations due to the COVID-19 pandemic. During the closure, parks donated supplies and food to their local communities.

As of August 2020, some Six Flags operations were still suspended. On May 13, Six Flags announced that when the parks reopen guests will be required to reserve their place online to enter the park, including purchasing their tickets to the park and parking. Six Flags Great Adventure opened its drive-through safari to the public on May 30. Frontier City became the first park of the company to reopen on June 5, with new health and safety protocols. Soon after Frontier City's announcement, several other parks in the company announced their reopening dates. Starting on February 19, 2021, Six Flags had started gradually re-opening their amusement parks to the public for the upcoming season due to reduced COVID-19 restrictions, and by May of that year, all parks had successfully re-opened to the public.

On March 22, 2021, Six Flags announced that Six Flags Great America's Hurricane Harbor park would be converted into a separate park, becoming Six Flags Hurricane Harbor Chicago. Since its opening in 2005, the park was a part of Great America, but in recent years had started charging a one-day ticket upgrade to access the park. The change into a separate park meant that Hurricane Harbor Chicago would become the 27th Six Flags park in the chain. On November 15, 2021, Six Flags Entertainment Corporation announced that Mike Spanos had stepped down and Selim Bassoul, the former chairman of the board, would become president and CEO of the company effective immediately. Ben Baldanza, a former airlines industry executive, was elected to replace Bassoul as the chairman of the board.

=== Merger with Cedar Fair ===
The logo of the new Six Flags company.

On November 2, 2023, Cedar Fair and Six Flags Entertainment Corporation announced an estimated $8 billion "merger of equals". Completed on July 1, 2024, the merger created the world's largest regional amusement park company, with 27 amusement parks, 15 water parks, and 9 resort properties. The new company was named Six Flags although Cedar Fair owners held a 51% stake. Cedar Fair President and CEO Richard Zimmerman became president and CEO of the new company, while Six Flags President and CEO Selim Bassoul became executive chairman of its board of directors. The company opened headquarters in Charlotte, North Carolina, retaining administrative and finance operations at Cedar Fair's headquarters in Sandusky, Ohio.

== Marketing efforts ==
=== TV commercials ===
In June 2003, Ackerman McQueen, who had been handling advertising for Six Flags since 1994, lost the account to the Doner Company.

In 2004, although DC Comics and Looney Tunes as well as Hanna-Barbera and Cartoon Network characters including Scooby-Doo still had a major presence at the parks, Six Flags began a new series of commercials for the parks. The commercials introduced a new mascot, conceived by the Doner Company, "Mr. Six", a seemingly feeble old man in a tuxedo and red bow tie. In many of the commercials, Mr. Six would slowly exit a multi-colored bus, only to start frenetically dancing to the Vengaboys' "We Like to Party". The commercials were an immediate hit and Mr. Six almost instantly became the de facto mascot, and his presence was felt for years after the character was retired. These ads have become widely parodied on the Internet, with faces from other Internet memes being superimposed over Mr. Six's face.

From 2008 to 2010, Six Flags' TV ads consisted of a "Fun-O-Meter" in which the beginning of the ad showed something boring or embarrassing, leading to a man's face popping up judging it to be "One Flag!" or "Oh! Two Flags!". Then roller coasters and attractions of Six Flags are shown and says "Six Flags! More Flags, More Fun!" for Six Flags parks. The thick accent of the Asian man in the original commercials drew criticism for being an offensive caricature. In 2009, the Mr. Six character came back from retirement and replaced the Asian man in Six Flags' ads, still using the Fun-O-Meter. In 2011, Six Flags' TV ads received a new slogan, "Go Big! Go Six Flags!", for its theme parks.

As part of Six Flags' effort to reopen theme parks in 2021 following the COVID-19 pandemic, Six Flags brought in a new slogan for both its social media and TV ads, "The Thrill is Calling".

=== Licensing with other brands and companies ===
Six Flags has licensed its name and its theme park creations to other companies, who have used these assets to create licensed products. One notable example is the theme park simulation game Roller Coaster Tycoon 2, which featured recreations of Six Flags parks and rides that could be expanded and operated at the player's discretion.

Six Flags has approximately 24 known current and past partners. These partners include Dole, Armitron, TCBY, Mrs. Fields, Famous Famiglia, Mike and Ike, Barcel, Ben & Jerry's, Good Humor, Nathan's Famous, Coca-Cola, Icee, Ortega, Cold Stone Creamery, J&J Snack Foods, Red Gold, Coppertone, Papa John's, Panda Express, Johnny Rockets, Samsung, Dasani, Mars and Tyson Foods. These businesses help the park generate more income. Most importantly, it provides more jobs for prospective employees. For example, Barcel USA expanded its partnership in 2013. This helps to import food and beverages to increase sponsorships within the United States.

In 2008, Six Flags partnered with Brash Entertainment to create a video game based on the Six Flags parks named Six Flags Fun Park. The game was first released on the Nintendo DS on October 28, 2008. The Wii version was delayed while the PC and PlayStation 2 versions were canceled after Brash Entertainment went out of business. On February 24, 2009, the rights to the Wii version were taken over by Ubisoft, who released it on March 3, 2009. The game allows players to explore the themed areas and mini-games representative of a visit to a Six Flags park. In the game, players are tasked with quests that encourage them to explore the park's universe. After creating a unique custom character, Six Flags Fun Park patrons can win prizes and compete with other players in 40 mini-games. Although the video game is called Six Flags Fun Park, it lacks any major reference of Six Flags outside of the names of the different areas. This caused some to speculate that the video game was created separately, then the rights to the name of the game were sold as a way to pay for the game's development. The game was released as simply Fun Park and Fun Park Party in Europe on the DS and Wii respectively. When the game was released, it eventually ended up getting abysmal ratings across the board. IGN gave the Wii version a 4.5 out of 10, saying "The quests are uninteresting and the game's '40 Thrilling Games' (as touted by the box) are far from entertaining."

=== Other assets ===
On June 19, 2007, Six Flags announced it had purchased 40% of Dick Clark Productions, which owns rights to American Bandstand and other shows and productions. On September 28, 2012, Six Flags sold its stake in Dick Clark Productions. Additionally, Six Flags owns many other shares in various companies, like Nestle, Google, Mars Candy, and Coca-Cola.

== Properties ==
=== Amusement parks ===
Name	Location	Year opened	Year acquired	Year closed/Sold	Fate	Notes
American Adventures	Marietta, Georgia	1990	1999	2008	Lease sold to Zuma Holdings, permanently closed in 2010	A family entertainment center located adjacent to Six Flags White Water, forming as part of Six Flags' smaller park offerings and as such did not adorn the "Six Flags" moniker. It was originally opened by Silver Dollar City, Inc. in 1990 and was sold alongside White Water to the management of Six Flags Over Georgia in May 1999, where Premier Parks/Six Flags took over operations. In June 2008, the owners leased the park over to independent company Zuma Holdings, which then separated the park from White Water. Following management issues, the park closed in February 2010, with Zuma citing "Reasons beyond our control". The park's permanent closure was soon confirmed the following month. After the park's closure, Six Flags purchased back the lease and now uses the site as an employee area. The park sat abandoned until the removal of the rides in 2017, aside from the Scrambler, which was sent to Six Flags Great Adventure.
Bellewaerde Park	Ypres, Belgium	1954	1998	2004	Sold to Palamon Capital Partners	Acquired in the Walibi SA purchase in 1998. Like the other parks in the Six Flags European Parks (StarParks) division, it was sold to Palamon Capital Partners in 2004. The park is currently owned and operated by Compagnie des Alpes.
Frontier City	Oklahoma City, Oklahoma	1958	1981; 2018	2007; 2024	Sold to PARC Management (2007); Transitioned to current Six Flags company (2024)	Premier Parks (then named The Tierco Group, Inc.) acquired the park in 1981. It was the nearest park to Premier/Six Flags' then-headquarters. It was one of seven parks acquired by PARC Management/CNL Income Properties in 2007. Operations were later given to Premier Parks, LLC in 2011, while CNL sold the park to EPR Properties in 2016. Under a deal with EPR, Six Flags re-acquired the park's operation lease in May 2018.
La Ronde	Montréal, Quebec	1967	2001	2024	Transitioned to current Six Flags company	Six Flags' only park in Canada before the 2024 merger with Cedar Fair. It was built for Expo 67, and is owned by the City of Montréal. Six Flags purchased the Emphyteutic lease to the property from the city in 2001, with the deal secured until 2065.
Six Flags America	Largo, Maryland	1973	1999	2024	Transitioned to current Six Flags company, closed in 2025	Premier Parks (then named The Tierco Group, Inc.) acquired the park in 1992 as Wild World. The company rebranded the park as Adventure World shortly afterward. The park was renamed Six Flags America in October 1998, the first park renamed after the Six Flags purchase. Following the Cedar Fair merger, the park continued operation until November 2, 2025.
Six Flags AstroWorld	Houston, Texas	1968	1974	2005	Closed	Originally owned and operated by the Astrodomain Corporation, Six Flags took on a 20-year operations lease from the company in 1974. Six Flags announced the park's closure in September 2005, and closed on October 30 of that year. The park was demolished between late 2005 and 2006.
Six Flags AutoWorld	Flint, Michigan	1984	Built by Six Flags	1985	Closed	This indoor entertainment venue closed after only six months due to its investors. Six Flags exited out of its operations lease after the 1985 season, and the park frequently kept opening and closing all the way until 1994, when it was closed permanently. The building housing the park was demolished in 1997.
Six Flags Belgium	Wavre, Belgium	1975	1998	2004	Sold to Palamon Capital Partners	Acquired as Walibi Wavre in the Walibi SA purchase in 1998, and was renamed Six Flags Belgium in 2001. Like the other parks in the Six Flags European Parks (StarParks) division, it was sold to Palamon Capital Partners in 2004 and renamed to Walibi Belgium in 2005. The park is currently owned and operated by Compagnie des Alpes.
Six Flags Darien Lake	Darien, New York	1981	1995; 2018	2007; 2024	Sold to PARC Management (2007); Transitioned to current Six Flags company (2024)	Originally acquired by Premier Parks in 1995 as part of the Funtime, Inc. purchase. The park gained the "Six Flags" moniker in 1999. It was one of seven parks acquired by PARC Management/CNL Income Properties in 2007, with the park being renamed back to Darien Lake. Operations were later given to Herschend Family Entertainment in 2011, and Premier Parks, LLC in 2014, while CNL sold the park to EPR Properties in 2016. Under a deal with EPR, Six Flags re-acquired the park's operation lease in May 2018, and the park was renamed back to Six Flags Darien Lake for the 2019 season.
Six Flags Discovery Kingdom	Vallejo, California	1968	1997	2024	Transitioned to current Six Flags company	The park, then named "Marine World", was purchased by the City of Vallejo in 1996. Premier Parks took over operations the following year, renaming it as The New Marine World in 1998, and Six Flags Marine World in 1999. It received its current name for the 2007 season, and shortly afterward, Six Flags took on full ownership of the property.
Six Flags Elitch Gardens	Denver, Colorado	1995	1996	2007	Sold to PARC Management	Premier Parks purchased the park from its original owners in 1996 and rebranded it under the Six Flags moniker in 1999. It was one of seven parks acquired by PARC Management/CNL Income Properties in 2007. Operations were later given to Herschend Family Entertainment in 2011, and Premier Parks, LLC in 2014. The park was purchased by Kroenke Sports & Entertainment in 2015.
Six Flags Fiesta Texas	San Antonio, Texas	1992	1998	2024	Transitioned to current Six Flags company	Originally named Fiesta Texas, the park was owned by USAA and managed by Gaylord Entertainment from 1992 to 1995. Six Flags took over park management in 1996 and added its moniker to the name. Six Flags fully purchased the park at the end of 1998.
Six Flags Great Adventure	Jackson, New Jersey	1974	1977	2024	Transitioned to current Six Flags company	Originally an independently owned park under the name "Great Adventure", Six Flags purchased the park in 1977. In 2012, Six Flags Wild Safari Adventure (now named Safari Off-Road Adventure) was combined with the park, making Great Adventure the second-largest theme park in the world.
Six Flags Great America	Gurnee, Illinois	1976	1984	2024	Transitioned to current Six Flags company	Originally owned and operated by the Marriott Corporation, Six Flags purchased the park for $114.5M in 1984. With the purchase, the company gained the rights to use Warner Bros. properties in the park.
Six Flags Great Escape	Queensbury, New York	1954	1996	2024	Transitioned to current Six Flags company	Premier Parks acquired the park from its original owner in 1996. It initially did not include the Six Flags name in its branding, but gained it in 2022. Before the purchase, the park was named Storytown USA.
Six Flags Holland	Biddinghuizen, Netherlands	1971	1998	2004	Sold to Palamon Capital Partners	Acquired as Walibi Flevo in the Walibi SA purchase in 1998, and was renamed Six Flags Holland in 2000. Like the other parks in the Six Flags European Parks (StarParks) division, it was sold to Palamon Capital Partners in 2004 and renamed to Walibi World in 2005, and Walibi Holland in 2011. The park is currently owned and operated by Compagnie des Alpes.
Six Flags Kentucky Kingdom	Louisville, Kentucky	1987	1997	2010	Lease ended	Premier Parks purchased the operations lease of the park in 1997 from its original owner. Rebranding under the "Six Flags" moniker in June 1998, it was the first ex-Premier Six Flags park to rebrand. In February 2010, Six Flags announced it would close the park due to a dispute with the Kentucky State Fair Board, from which Six Flags leased much of the park's land area and attractions. In 2014, Kentucky Kingdom reopened under new management through the Kentucky State Fair Board, and as of 2021 is operated by Herschend Family Entertainment.
Six Flags Magic Mountain	Valencia, California	1971	1979	2024	Transitioned to current Six Flags company	Originally owned and operated by the Newhall Land and Farming Company as Magic Mountain, Six Flags purchased the park for $51M in 1979.
Six Flags México	Mexico City, Mexico	1982	1999	2024	Transitioned to current Six Flags company	Originally named Reino Aventura, Premier Parks/Six Flags purchased the park for $59M in 1999. The park was completely reinvented and reopened as Six Flags México in 2000.
Six Flags New England	Agawam, Massachusetts	1870	1996	2024	Transitioned to current Six Flags company	Originally named Gallup's Grove, Riverside Grove, and Riverside Park, it is one of the two oldest parks in the chain, predating the founding of the first Six Flags Park by nearly a century. Premier Parks purchased it from its original owners at the end of 1996, rebranding it as simply Riverside in 1997, and eventually Six Flags New England for the 2000 season.
Six Flags New Orleans	New Orleans, Louisiana	2000	2002	2005	Destroyed	Originally opened as Jazzland, this park was operated by Ogden Entertainment under a lease from the city of New Orleans. Six Flags purchased the park's operations lease in 2002 and re-branded it as Six Flags New Orleans in 2003. It was closed after severe damage from Hurricane Katrina in 2005. The city of New Orleans sued Six Flags in 2009 for not making progress to re-open and for not making required lease payments; Ultimately, the site was turned over to the city along with a cash payment. In 2011, the city made plans to auction the site and all remaining rides and equipment.
Six Flags Over Georgia	Austell, Georgia	1967	Built by Six Flags	2024	Transitioned to current Six Flags company	One of three parks constructed by Six Flags. Like Six Flags Over Texas, the park is partially owned by a limited partnership and is managed and operated by Six Flags.
Six Flags Over Texas	Arlington, Texas	1961	Built by Six Flags	2024	Transitioned to current Six Flags company	The first Six Flags park. The park is partially owned by a limited partnership and is managed and operated by Six Flags.
Six Flags Power Plant	Baltimore, Maryland	1985	Built by Six Flags	1987	Sold, then closed	Located in the Inner Harbor district of Baltimore, this was Six Flags' second attempt at an indoor amusement park after AutoWorld. As with AutoWorld, Power Plant was also a financial failure, operating for one and a half years. The attached nightclub P.T. Flagg's lasted until 1990. The site of the park was redeveloped into an entertainment complex containing a Hard Rock Cafe, Barnes & Noble (closed 2020), Gold's Gym (closed 2010) and the world's first ESPN Zone location (closed 2010 and replaced by Phillips Seafood).
Six Flags St. Louis	Eureka, Missouri	1971	Built by Six Flags	2024	Transitioned to current Six Flags company	The last park built by Six Flags, and the only one out of the original three to be fully owned by the company. It opened as Six Flags Over Mid-America, with the name change to Six Flags St. Louis occurring in 1996.
Six Flags Worlds of Adventure	Aurora, Ohio	1887	1995	2004	Sold to Cedar Fair	Initially opening as Geauga Lake, the park was acquired by Premier Parks in 1995 as part of the Funtime, Inc. purchase. The park was renamed under the Six Flags moniker as Six Flags Ohio in 2000. After the company purchased the adjacent SeaWorld Ohio marine park the following year, the entire complex became Six Flags Worlds of Adventure, forming the largest theme park of all time, at over 700 acres. Following Six Flags' financial woes, low attendance, and profits, the property was sold to competing amusement park operator Cedar Fair in 2004 and reverted to its former name of Geauga Lake. The park was closed after the 2007 season, but the attached water park, which Cedar Fair opened on the former SeaWorld/Wild Life side in 2005, remained open until the end of the 2016 season.
Warner Bros. Movie World Germany	Bottrop, Germany	1996	1999	2004	Sold to Palamon Capital Partners	Acquired following Premier Parks' purchase of Six Flags and Warner Bros.' European park chain from Time Warner in 1999. Like the other parks in the Six Flags European Parks (StarParks) division, it was sold to Palamon Capital Partners in 2004. As the deal did not include the Warner Bros. license, it was rebranded as Movie Park Germany in 2005, featuring themes from other movie companies. Since 2010, the park has been owned and operated by Parques Reunidos.
Warner Bros. Movie World Madrid/Warner Bros. Park Madrid	Madrid, Spain	2002	N/A	2004	Lease terminated	The park was initially planned by Warner Bros. European Parks before its purchase by Premier Parks in 1999; of which the park would be constructed and opened in 2002. The park was owned as a joint venture between Six Flags, Time Warner, and various Spanish shareholders; with Six Flags holding a 5% stake and an operations lease. It was not included in the sale of Six Flags European Parks to Palamon Capital Partners, and their contract to operate it was terminated in November 2004. The park began being self-operated from then-on, with Warner Bros. acquiring Six Flags' ownership stake. It was renamed to Parque Warner Madrid in 2006 and is currently owned and operated by Parques Reunidos, with Warner Bros. continuing to hold a 5% minority stake.
Walibi Aquitaine	Bordeaux, France	1992	1998	2004	Sold to Palamon Capital Partners	Acquired in the Walibi SA purchase in 1998. Like the other parks in the Six Flags European Parks (StarParks) division, it was sold to Palamon Capital Partners in 2004, being renamed to Walibi Sud-Ouest in 2010. It was later acquired by Compagnie des Alpes, who sold the park to Aspro Parks in 2016. The park remained under the Walibi brand until 2021, when the park was renamed Walygator Sud-Ouest.
Walibi Lorraine	Metz, France	1989	1998	2004	Sold to Palamon Capital Partners	Acquired as Walibi Schtroumpf in the Walibi SA purchase in 1998, and was renamed Walibi Lorraine in 2003 following the expiration of The Smurfs license. Like the other parks in the Six Flags European Parks (StarParks) division, it was sold to Palamon Capital Partners in 2004. The park was sold by StarParks to Claude and Didier Le Douarin in 2006, who renamed it Walygator Parc in 2007. Aspro Parks acquired the park in 2016 and was renamed as Walygator Grand-Est in 2021.
Walibi Rhône-Alpes	Lyon, France	1979	1998	2004	Sold to Palamon Capital Partners	Acquired in Walibi SA purchase in 1998. Like the other parks in the Six Flags European Parks (StarParks) division, it was sold to Palamon Capital Partners in 2004. The park is currently owned and operated by Compagnie des Alpes.
Wild Waves and Enchanted Village	Federal Way, Washington	1977	2000	2007	Sold to PARC Management	Acquired from its original owner at the end of December 2000, this was a joint theme/water park that formed part of their smaller park offerings and as such did not adorn the "Six Flags" moniker (instead being promoted as "A Six Flags Theme Park"). It was one of seven parks acquired by PARC Management/CNL Income Properties sale in 2007, of which operations would soon be taken over by Norpoint Entertainment in 2011, and Premier Parks, LLC in 2016, while ownership was taken on by EPR Properties in 2016. Since 2017, the park has been known solely as Wild Waves Theme & Water Park.
Wyandot Lake	Columbus, Ohio	1937; 1983 (water park)	1995	2006	Lease sold back to Columbus Zoo	Originally acquired by Premier Parks in 1995 as part of the Funtime, Inc. purchase. This was a joint theme/water park that formed as part of Premier Parks/Six Flags' smaller park offerings and as such did not adorn the "Six Flags" moniker (instead being promoted as "A Six Flags Theme Park"). Six Flags leased the land from the organization that owned the adjacent Columbus Zoo, and in June 2006 announced to sell the lease back to the Zoo due to their financial woes. The park was entirely reconstructed as a water park named Zoombezi Bay while the remaining rides were merged into the Zoo grounds as Jungle Jack's Landing (later renamed Rides At Adventure Cove), of which the new facilities opened under zoo management on May 26, 2008.

=== Water parks ===
Name	Location	Year opened	Year acquired	Year closed/Sold	Fate	Notes
Aqualibi	Wavre, Belgium	1987	1998	2004	Sold to Palamon Capital Partners	Located adjacent to Six Flags Belgium. It was acquired in the Walibi SA purchase in 1998, and was the only indoor water park owned by Six Flags during their ownership tenure of the property. Like the other parks in the Six Flags European Parks (StarParks) division, it was sold to Palamon Capital Partners in 2004. The park is currently owned and operated by Compagnie des Alpes.
Aqualibi	Lyon, France	1986	1998	2004	Sold to Palamon Capital Partners	Located within Walibi Rhône-Alpes and included with the price of admission to the park. Like the other parks in the Six Flags European Parks (StarParks) division, it was sold to Palamon Capital Partners in 2004 and later Compagnie des Alpes, where they renamed the facility as L'Île aux Pirates before closing in 2019.
Island Kingdom	Denver, Colorado	1995	1996	2007	Sold to PARC Management	Located within Six Flags Elitch Gardens and was included with the price of admission to the park. Alongside Elitch Gardens, it was sold to PARC Management/CNL Income Properties in 2007.
Six Flags Atlantis	Hollywood, Florida	1984	1983	1989	Sold (later Destroyed)	Initially known as "Atlantis, The Water Kingdom" during its construction, Six Flags purchased the near-completed park as part of a joint venture in 1983 after its previous owners went bankrupt, and opened as Six Flags Atlantis in 1984. Six Flags sold the property in 1989 to a property developer, who secured an operations deal with another company to continue operating the park until 1992 under its original name. The park was soon destroyed following the events of Hurricane Andrew and was demolished in 1994, with a business estate being situated on the former site.
Six Flags Hurricane Harbor	Queensbury, New York	1995	1996	2024	Transitioned to current Six Flags company	Located within Six Flags Great Escape and included with the price of admission. It was known as Splashwater Kingdom until 2019.
Six Flags Hurricane Harbor	Austell, Georgia	2014	—N/a	2024	Transitioned to current Six Flags company	Located within Six Flags Over Georgia.
Six Flags Hurricane Harbor	Eureka, Missouri	1999	—N/a	2024	Transitioned to current Six Flags company	Located within Six Flags St. Louis.
Six Flags Hurricane Harbor Arlington	Arlington, Texas	1983	1995	2024	Transitioned to current Six Flags company	located across Interstate 30 from Six Flags Over Texas. It was originally a Wet 'n Wild water park, which Six Flags acquired in 1995 and renamed in 1997.
Six Flags Hurricane Harbor Concord	Concord, California	1995	2017	1996; 2024	Sold to PARC Management (2007); Transitioned to current Six Flags company (2024)	Located about 15 miles from Six Flags Discovery Kingdom. It was acquired as Waterworld USA Concord alongside its former sister park, Waterworld USA Sacramento, in 1996, and renamed to Six Flags Waterworld Concord in 2005. It was one of seven parks acquired by PARC Management/CNL Income Properties in 2007, where the park was renamed as Waterworld California. Operations were later given to Premier Parks, LLC in 2011, while CNL sold the park to EPR Properties in 2016. Under a deal with EPR, Six Flags re-acquired the park's operation lease in 2017 and announced it would be renamed under its current name in February 2018.
Six Flags Hurricane Harbor Chicago	Gurnee, Illinois	2005	—N/a	2024	Transitioned to current Six Flags company	Located adjacent to Six Flags Great America. The park was originally included with the price of admission to Great America, and gained the "Chicago" prefix when it became a separate park in 2021; becoming the company's twenty-seventh property.
Six Flags Hurricane Harbor Darien Lake	Darien, New York	1990	1995; 2018	2007; 2024	Sold to PARC Management (2007); Transitioned to current Six Flags company (2024)	Located within Six Flags Darien Lake, and originally named Barracuda Bay under Premier/Six Flags. Under PARC Management/CNL Income Properties, it was renamed Splashtown at Darien Lake in 2010 prior to Six Flags purchasing back the park's operation lease under a deal with EPR Properties in 2018. The park was renamed under its current name in 2022.
Six Flags Hurricane Harbor Los Angeles	Valencia, California	1995	—N/a	2024	Transitioned to current Six Flags company	Located adjacent to Six Flags Magic Mountain.
Six Flags Hurricane Harbor Maryland	Largo, Maryland	1982	1992	2024	Transitioned to current Six Flags company	Located within Six Flags America. Formerly known as Paradise Island until being renamed Hurricane Harbor in 2005, gaining the "Maryland" suffix in 2023. The park continued operation after the Cedar Fair merger until 2025.
Six Flags Hurricane Harbor New England	Agawam, Massachusetts	1997	1998	2024	Transitioned to current Six Flags company	Located within Six Flags New England. It was originally named as Island Kingdom, and renamed to Hurricane Harbor in 2003, gaining the "New England" suffix in the 2020s.
Six Flags Hurricane Harbor New Jersey	Jackson, New Jersey	2000	—N/a	2024	Transitioned to current Six Flags company	Located near Six Flags Great Adventure.
Six Flags Hurricane Harbor Oaxtepec	Oaxtepec, Mexico	2017	2016	2024	Transitioned to current Six Flags company	Located one hour from Six Flags Mexico. Six Flags acquired the site of the former Parque Acuatico Oaxtepec location in 2016, and opened Hurricane Harbor on it in 2017.
Six Flags Hurricane Harbor Oklahoma City	Oklahoma City, Oklahoma	1981	1991; 2018	2007; 2024	Sold to PARC Management (2007); Transitioned to current Six Flags company (2024)	Located about 15 miles from Frontier City. Premier Parks (then named The Tierco Group, Inc.) acquired the park from Silver Dollar City, Inc. in 1991, originally named White Water and later White Water Bay. It was one of seven parks acquired by PARC Management/CNL Income Properties in 2007. Operations were later given to Premier Parks, LLC in 2011, while CNL sold the park to EPR Properties in 2016. Under a deal with EPR, Six Flags re-acquired the park's operation lease in May 2018. It was renamed to its current name in 2020.
Six Flags Hurricane Harbor Phoenix	Phoenix, Arizona	2009	2018	2024	Transitioned to current Six Flags company	Originally opened as Wet 'n' Wild Phoenix and is owned by EPR Properties. Six Flags acquired the park's operation lease from Premier Parks, LLC in 2018 and renamed it under its current name in 2019.
Six Flags Hurricane Harbor Rockford	Cherry Valley, Illinois	1984	2019	2024	Transitioned to current Six Flags company	Originally opened as Magic Waters and is owned by the Rockford Park District. Six Flags secured a ten-year operations lease for the park from the company on April 1, 2019, and rebranded the park under the Hurricane Harbor name shortly after.
Six Flags Hurricane Harbor San Antonio	San Antonio, Texas	1992	1998	2024	Transitioned to current Six Flags company	Located adjacent to Six Flags Fiesta Texas, and was originally included with park admission. The park was formerly known as Ol' Waterin' Hole from 1992 to 1998, Armadillo Beach from 1999 to 2005, and White Water Bay from 2005 to 2022. In 2023, it was rebranded to its current name and became a separately gated facility.
Six Flags Hurricane Harbor SplashTown	Spring, Texas	1984	1999; 2018	2007; 2024	Sold to PARC Management (2007); Transitioned to current Six Flags company (2024)	Located 30 miles from the defunct Six Flags AstroWorld. It was originally acquired by Premier Parks in 1999 as SplashTown USA and was renamed Six Flags SplashTown in 2005. It was one of seven parks acquired by PARC Management/CNL Income Properties in 2007, with the park being renamed as SplashTown Houston and later Wet 'n' Wild SplashTown. Operations were later given to Premier Parks, LLC in 2011, while CNL sold the park to EPR Properties in 2016. Under a deal with EPR, Six Flags re-acquired the park's operation lease in May 2018 and was renamed to its current name in 2019.
Six Flags Splashwater Kingdom	Louisville, Kentucky	1992	1997	2010	Lease ended	Located within Six Flags Kentucky Kingdom. It originally opened as Hurricane Bay and was renamed to Six Flags Splashwater Kingdom in 2007. As with Kentucky Kingdom, Six Flags' lease was revoked by the Kentucky State Fair Board in 2010, and the water park reopened with Kentucky Kingdom in 2014, reverting back to the Hurricane Bay name.
Six Flags WaterWorld	Houston, Texas	1983	N/A	2005	Closed	A water park located within the grounds of Six Flags AstroWorld. Initially opening as simply WaterWorld, it was soon merged into the park's operations in 2002 and became included with admission to AstroWorld. Much like AstroWorld, WaterWorld was closed and demolished in 2005–06.
Six Flags White Water	Marietta, Georgia	1983	1999	2024	Transitioned to current Six Flags company	Located about 15 miles from Six Flags Over Georgia. The park was purchased from Silver Dollar City, Inc. in 1999, alongside its former adjacent sister park, American Adventures. The park is owned by the management of Six Flags Over Georgia, while Six Flags itself operates the park.
Waterworld Sacramento	Sacramento, California	1980	1996	2006	Lease Ended	A water park situated within the grounds of the California Exposition and State Fair (Cal Expo), and was leased by FRE Inc. under the name of Waterworld USA Sacramento. Premier Parks acquired the lease of the park alongside the sister park Waterworld USA Concord in October 1996. The park was renamed Six Flags Waterworld Sacramento in 2005 but removed the "Six Flags" moniker the following year. In April 2006, Six Flags announced that they would no longer operate the park after the 2006 season. Shortly afterwards, Palace Entertainment acquired the lease from the land owners and reopened it for the 2007 season as Raging Waters Sacramento, operating it until the end of 2022. Silverwood Entertainment took over operations in 2023 and will reopen the park after a lengthy refurbishment phase in 2027.
White Water Bay	Queensbury, New York	2006	—N/a	2024	Transitioned to current Six Flags company	Located inside the Six Flags Great Escape Lodge, across from Six Flags Great Escape. At the time of the Cedar Fair merger, this was the only indoor water park owned and operated by Six Flags. Park facilities are available at no extra cost for resort guests, and as a separately paid facility for those not staying at the resort.
Wild West Water Works	Oklahoma City, Oklahoma	2017	2018	2024	Transitioned to current Six Flags company	Located within Frontier City. Initially opened as a water play structure of the same name in 2012, and turned into a small water park in 2017 with the addition of three water slides.

=== Resorts ===
Name	Location	Year opened	Year acquired	Year closed/Sold	Fate	Notes
Six Flags Darien Lake Hotel & Campground	Darien, New York	1954	1995; 2018	2007; 2024	Sold to PARC Management (2007); Transitioned to current Six Flags company (2024)	Located across from Six Flags Darien Lake, existing prior to the park's construction. The complex contains a hotel opened in 1998, a campground with cabins, guest houses and rentable RVs; Darien Square and Darien Lake Performing Arts Center. It is owned by EPR Properties, as with the park.
Six Flags Great Escape Lodge & Indoor Waterpark	Queensbury, New York	2006	—N/a	2024	Transitioned to current Six Flags company	Located across from Six Flags Great Escape, includes a resort and an indoor Water park called White Water Bay.
Six Flags Savannah Sunset Resort & Spa	Jackson, New Jersey	2024	—N/a	2024	Transitioned to current Six Flags company	Located within Six Flags Wild Safari Adventure in Six Flags Great Adventure. This was the last Six Flags property to open under the former Six Flags company, as the Cedar Fair merger was finalized a few weeks after opening.

=== Safari parks ===
Name	Location	Year opened	Year acquired	Year closed/Sold	Fate	Notes
Six Flags Wild Safari Adventure	Jackson, New Jersey	1974	1977	2024	Transitioned to current Six Flags company	Located within Six Flags Great Adventure. It was originally known as Wild Safari and was a separately ticketed facility from the park; but since 2013 it has been integrated within Great Adventure at no extra cost.

=== Other facilities ===
Name	Location	Year opened	Year acquired	Year closed/Sold	Fate	Notes
Admiral	St. Louis, Missouri	1987	1987	1987	Closed and sold	The Admiral was an excursion steamboat that had previously operated on the Mississippi River, which was re-purposed by Six Flags and opened as an entertainment center in 1987, featuring several music venues, a restaurant, and the "Birdland Theater," a set of 14 animated, mechanical birds that played music. The venture missed a payment on its electricity bill in November of that year and was subsequently closed and later renovated into a floating casino.
Movieland Wax Museum	Buena Park, California	1962	1970	1985	Sold	Six Flags purchased this wax museum in 1970. The company sold the venue in 1985, and later sold all of its holdings and moved many of the sets and wax figures to California, but sold the original clothing and props to the American Musical Academy of Arts Association. The venue eventually closed down on October 31, 2005; figures and props were auctioned off in 2006, and the building was demolished in 2016.
Stars Hall of Fame	Orlando, Florida	1975	Built by Six Flags	1984	Sold, soon closed by purchaser	This wax museum was located near SeaWorld Orlando. It was acquired by Harcourt Brace Jovanovich alongside SeaWorld, but was closed almost immediately after the sale.

=== Cancelled parks ===
Park	Location	Year planned to open	Year canceled	Notes
Six Flags Entertainment Village	Gurnee, Illinois	2000s	1999	An entertainment complex that would have included a water park, hotel, shopping mall and stadium. This was later canceled in 1999 due to resident opposition, and had never went past the development phase.
Six Flags Chongqing	Bishan, China	2020s	2020	Planned to be the second Six Flags-branded theme park in China. Following Riverside's financial turmoil, Six Flags ended its licensing agreement.
Six Flags Kids World Chongqing	Bishan, China	2020s	2020	A Six Flags theme park designed especially for families with young children. Located adjacent to Six Flags Chongqing.
Six Flags Adventure Park Chongqing	Bishan, China	2020s	2020	Adjoins the Six Flags Chongqing complex.
Six Flags Dubai	Dubai, UAE	2011	2019	Located in the second phase of Dubai Parks and Resorts, it was in development for more than ten years and was originally scheduled to open in 2011 and then 2019. However, the developer had financial issues and the project was canceled.
Six Flags Nanjing	Nanjing, China	2020s	2020	This would have been the third Six Flags theme park in China. Following Riverside's financial turmoil, Six Flags ended its licensing agreement.
Six Flags Kids World Nanjing	Nanjing, China	2020s	2020	Six Flags theme park designed especially for families with young children. 4th park announced in Six Flags Nanjing complex.
Six Flags Adventure Park Nanjing	Nanjing, China	2020s	2020	Adjoining the Six Flags Nanjing complex
Six Flags Hurricane Harbor Nanjing	Nanjing, China	2020s	2020	Part of four park Six Flags Nanjing complex
Six Flags Zhejiang	Haiyan, China	2020s	2020	Was planned to be the first Six Flags theme park in China in partnership with Riverside Group. Following Riverside's financial turmoil, Six Flags ended its licensing agreement. The park was renamed as "Hangzhou Bay Sunac Tourism City" by its new owners Sunac, and construction has been delayed. It is unknown whether the park will open at a later date.
Six Flags Hurricane Harbor Zhejiang	Haiyan, China	2020s	2020	Was rebranded as the Sunac Water Park by Sunac after Six Flags ended its agreement with Riverside Investment, and opened in June 2021.
Six Flags Kids World Zhejiang	Haiyan, China	2020s	2020	Six Flags theme park designed especially for families with young children. Located adjacent to Six Flags Zhejiang

== The Flash Pass ==
The Flash Pass was an optional, pay-per-person virtual queue system offered at Six Flags amusement parks. The system, named after DC Comics character The Flash, allows guests to reserve places in line at participating attractions, and access must be purchased for a nominal fee in addition to the general park admission price. The first iteration, called Q-bot, was designed by Lo-Q and was first implemented at Six Flags Over Georgia in 2001. Guests are given handheld devices, which are then used to make reservations and receive notifications when it is their turn to ride. Another iteration is where guests can scan a QR code on in-park signs or through the mobile app, and guests can buy individual Flash Passes per ride or use their season pass or membership Flash Pass. This feature was adopted in 2021.

A water park version of the virtual system called Q-band was first tested at Six Flags White Water in 2011. Guests wear waterproof RFID wristbands that can be scanned at kiosks near participating water park attractions.

Following the 2024 merger between Cedar Fair and Six Flags, The Flash Pass was replaced in January 2026 with Cedar Fair's system Fast Lane.

== See also ==
- Incidents at Six Flags parks
- Six Flags Fright Fest
- Holiday in the Park

== Notes and references ==
Notes
