= Hangzhou Bay Sunac Tourism City =

Theme park in Jiaxing, Zhejiang, China

Sunac Land
- Previously known as Six Flags Zhejiang (2015 - 2020)
- Interactive map of Sunac Land
- Location: Hangzhou Bay Sunac Tourism City, Haiyan, Zhejiang, China
- Status: Cancelled
- Opened: Unknown
- Owner: Sunac China Holdings Ltd.
- Operated by: Maynex Private Limited
- Area: 450,000 square metres (110 acres)

Attractions
- Roller coasters: 4
- Website: Official website

Hangzhou Bay Sunac Tourism City (Previously known as Six Flags Zhejiang) is a partially completed theme park and entertainment complex in Jiaxing, Zhejiang, China, about 45 miles from downtown Shanghai. It was announced by the Six Flags Entertainment Corporation in 2015 as part of the company's bid to open multiple parks in China. In February 2020, Six Flags dropped out of the project when their partner, Riverside Investment Group, was unable to meet their financial obligations. In June 2020, Sunac China Holdings took over the project and opened the Sunac Water Park in June 2021. The complex was projected to open in stages, although nothing else has since made progress.

== History ==
=== Development (Six Flags) ===
Concept artwork for the Six Flags Zhejiang park in 2015

Six Flags first announced their intention on June 23, 2014 to develop new Chinese theme park projects in a partnership with real estate developer Riverside Investment Group. Their first location was confirmed as 'Six Flags Zhejiang in September 2015 to open in Haiyan County, Zhejiang, and the development held its official groundbreaking ceremony on January 4, 2016. The park would be divided into several zones, many themed after various existing Six Flags parks; Thrillseeker Plaza, Magic Mountain, Great Adventure, Fiesta Texas, Waterfront Square, and the later-announced Garfield Beach. At the time, the project's total budget was estimated at $4.6 billion USD, with anticipations to open the main Six Flags Zhejiang theme park by 2019.

On December 19, 2016, Six Flags and Riverside announced plans to debut a Hurricane Harbor waterpark adjacent to Six Flags Zhejiang, and it was later revealed that the waterslides would be supplied by Richmond-based WhiteWater West. Original timeline estimates for the waterpark held it as the first phase of the resort, in which it was projected to open in June 2020. The development held the grand opening of the Zhejiang Riverside Themed Town Exhibition preview centre on August 4, 2017. On October 26, 2017, Six Flags and Riverside confirmed that a second gate children's park – Six Flags Kids World – was being developed next to the Six Flags Zhejiang park.

Multiple IP's were contracted to be featured at the parks during development. In May 2017, the partners announced that they had acquired the rights from Paws, Inc. to theme the children's areas at Six Flags Zhejiang and Chongqing after the Garfield franchise. Speaking about the project, Garfield’s creator Jim Davis iterated, “This is a great opportunity for Garfield to entertain families and children. Six Flags and Riverside have an extraordinary project planned and to have our characters featured is an incredible honor.” At the annual IAAPA Orlando Expo in November 2019, Sally Dark Rides unveiled the Garfield's Underwater Adventure dark ride that was planned to debut within a Garfield Beach area at both parks, which included a mixture of animatronics and projection screens. In March 2018, it was confirmed that dark rides based on the Tuzki illustrated character would debut at the Zhejiang and Chongqing parks.

=== Challenges and cancellation ===
Six Flags' Chinese projects were hit by numerous delays in their construction and implementation throughout the development period. On February 14, 2019, Six Flags announced delays of its Chinese parks' opening timelines amid a declining real estate economy and a fourth-quarter revenue roughly $15 million lower than anticipated, leading shares to drop significantly. In an earnings call on October 23, 2019, then-CEO Jim Reid-Anderson stating, "Part of it is our partner, part of it is the economy, part of it is the local government saying this is when we can have everything ready for you in order to be able to open a park". Six Flags also noted a significant decrease in international sponsorship fees.

In late 2019, reports surfaced that Six Flags’ partner Riverside Group – known by their Chinese alias Shanshui Wenyuan – was encountering financial trouble amid a declining real estate market. Local publications discovered that construction on the Six Flags Zhejiang site had been suspended earlier in the year, with no progress having taken place in months. Documents began circulating in December that Riverside would lay off a majority of its employees, aiming to retain only 65 individuals out of their 754-strong headquarters workforce, in which the remaining members would only receive 30% of their salary between January 1 and June 1 of 2020. On December 22, trading was halted on their stock due to a widespread contract dispute.

On January 10, 2020, Six Flags disclosed that, “The development of the Six Flags-branded parks in China has encountered continued challenges and has not progressed as expected”, as well as revealing that Riverside had defaulted on its payments to the company. Six Flags warned of a fourth-quarter revenue shortfall and as a result, a possible cancellation of the projects. The announcement led their shares on the New York Stock Exchange to drop 19% to a five-year low of $35.28 per share – levels within the day not seen since October 2014. In February 2020, amid the then-emerging COVID-19 pandemic, Six Flags formally terminated their Chinese projects, leaving the projects in limbo and the Six Flags Zhejiang site abandoned. A class action lawsuit was filed against Six Flags by investors on February 12, 2020, alleging that the company had misled investors on the progress of their Chinese properties between April 2018 and their warning in January 2020. The lawsuit was dismissed by a federal court in March 2021 on the basis of prejudice.

=== Project revival (Sunac) ===
On June 2, 2020, developer Sunac China signed an agreement with the government of Haiyan County to take over the suspended Six Flags Zhejiang project, with the intention of constructing four theme park/waterpark gates, a business quarter, and a hotel. Work on the mostly-constructed waterpark was completed, and the rebranded Sunac Water Park held its official grand opening on June 26, 2021. Construction resumed in 2020 on the Sunac Land theme park following modifications to the Six Flags/Riverside plans. As of 2023, construction was delayed for unknown reasons and it is unknown if the park will open in the future. A third development, the Sunac Snow World indoor ski slope, officially broke ground on October 18, 2021, and is anticipated to open in 2024. However, the park's construction is halted, and the opening is postponed.

== Sunac Land ==
Originally known as Six Flags Zhejiang, the project was first announced in 2015, with an original opening date set for June 2019. Although groundbreaking on the resort had occurred in January 2016, construction of the actual theme park formally began on May 1, 2017. Upon Sunac's takeover of the project, the park was rebranded as Sunac Land, and resumed construction. The park was originally set to open in late 2022. However, due to construction delays and an uncertainty of the park's future, it is unknown if the park will continue construction and/or open.

=== Roller coasters ===
| Name | Manufacturer/Model | Comments |
|---|---|---|
| Unknown | Maurer AG spinning coaster | A clone of the Now You See Me: High Roller at Motiongate Dubai. The coaster will include one of the first non-inverting loops on a spinning coaster. |
| Unknown | Mack Rides Powersplash | A multi-launch shuttle water coaster. |
| Unknown | Mack Rides Hyper Coaster | The park's largest coaster, it will include a drop of 196.8 feet (60.0 m) in height, reach a top speed of 67.1 mph (108.0 km/h), and represent a ¥100 million ($15.4 million USD) investment. |
| Unknown | Jinma Rides junior coaster | A KSC-16 model coaster from the manufacturer. The coaster was constructed in late May of 2021. |

=== Rides ===
| Name | Manufacturer/Model | Comments |
|---|---|---|
| Unknown | Ferris wheel | A ferris wheel that stands as East China's tallest at 420 feet (130 m) tall. |
| Unknown | S&S Sansei Triple Tower | A triple drop tower complex, advertised to be the first of its kind (as in having three towers) in China. Also the first 3-tower complex installed since the SkyScreamer at Marineland in 2004. Vertical construction of the attraction began in October 2021. |
| Unknown | Jinma Rides Shoot the Chute | Features two structures, each of which contain a lift hill and drop. The ride's layout was designed to occupy a site similar to another proposed Mack Rides water coaster featured in early plans for the park, which would have been a clone layout of the Poseidon at Europa-Park. |

== Sunac Water Park ==
Originally known as Six Flags Hurricane Harbor Zhejiang, the waterpark was formally announced on December 19, 2016. Construction formally began in a ceremony on June 23, 2018, and waterslide pieces began arriving soon after. After the project was taken over by Sunac, the newly-rebranded Sunac Water Park held its official grand opening on June 26, 2021. The waterpark spans an area of 105,000 m^{2} (26 acres) and features more than 27 waterslides (18 unique attractions). All of the park's waterslides were provided by WhiteWater West.

=== Water slides ===
- Sea Dragon (Chinese: 海上飞龙) - A master blaster waterslide that blasts riders up six uphill sections, stands 75.5 feet (23.0 m) tall, and has a length of 1,138.5 feet (347.0 m). The slide is ridden with inner tubes seating up to two riders.
- Express Typhoon (Chinese: 极速大喇叭) - A pair of six-passenger raft slides. One sends riders through a nearly 100 feet (30 m) tall funnel element, while the other navigates a combination of Whitewater's Constrictor and Python elements.
- Skyrocket (Chinese: 冲天回旋) - A 41-foot (12 m) waterslide complex composing of four slides, two of which are ridden with inner tubes. The inner tube pair is modeled after waterslides at the Island H2O Live! waterpark in Kissimmee, Florida, and feature a Master Blaster/Boomerango combo and a Constrictor/Rattler blend of elements. The second pair is ridden in harder boats and utilize the "Slideboarding" experience; players must score points by hitting buttons on their vehicle to match upcoming lights.
- Time Travel (Chinese: 时光穿梭) - A waterslide complex with six tube slides, one of which packs in three "Rattler" funnel elements and another of which sends riders through a bowl element. The set of slides is an exact clone of the Slither’s Slides complex at Yas Waterworld in Abu Dhabi, UAE.
- Rainbow Slideway (Chinese: 彩虹竞技) - A six-lane racing slide with an advertised length of 492 feet (150 m) per lane and a pair of uphill sections. The slides are ridden head-first with matts.
- 12 Seconds (Chinese: 极速12秒) - A body slide complex that is identical to the Dueling' Daltons at Typhoon Texas in Katy, Texas. Three of the slides utilize trap door starts - one plummets down a drop, another through the helix, and the final navigating an Aqualoop element - while the other two are lower-level, less thrilling body slides.
- Lost Lagoon (Chinese: 缤纷水城) - A large water play structure featuring multiple tube and body slides, including a body bowl slide and a half pipe. The attraction is a copy of the Lost City of Atlantis at Mt. Olympus Water & Theme Park in Wisconsin Dells, Wisconsin.
- Langhua Kindergarten (Chinese: 浪花幼儿园) - A series of children's body and tube slides, one of them of which navigates a miniature funnel element.
- Kid's Slideway (Chinese: 儿童滑道) - A children's trio of body slides surrounded by a toddler pool and spray area.
- Waterslide - A mild body slide located in the park's SPA area.

=== Water rides ===
- Jet Ski (Chinese: 水上摩托艇) - A pair of Zierer Jet Ski spinning rides.
- Naval Battle (Chinese: 秘境水战) - A 476-foot (145 m) long Zamperla Water Fight where riders - aboard boats - are able to splash other boats with water guns as they pass in close proximity to each other.
- Water Carnival (Chinese: 水上狂欢) - A Teacups-esque attraction where riders are equipped with water guns to spray at other riders. The ride is a six-boat Watermania manufactured by Zamperla.
- Sailor Training Camp (Chinese: 水手训练营) - A suspended aerial obstacle course.

=== Other attractions ===
- Adventure Harbor (Chinese: 冒险港湾) - An activity area.
- Brave Surfing (Chinese: 乘风破浪) - A FlowRider attraction where riders surf on an artificial wave – a constant sheet of water being propelled up an incline.
- Double Outlet Wave Pool (Chinese: 海啸巨浪) - A 7,000 m2 (75,347 sq ft) double wave pool that produces a variety of waves. The pool is equipped with a large LED stage, which is utilized to host light shows and play music.
- Drifting (Chinese: 悠悠飘流) - A 3,150-foot (960 m) long lazy river that encompasses the center of the park.

In addition to the above attractions, a pair of 4-person raft slides were also purchased from WhiteWater West, but ultimately not constructed.
