= Great Southwest Corporation =

Defunct real estate development company

- Company type: Public
- Industry: Real Estate; Entertainment
- Founded: January 1956; 70 years ago
- Founders: Angus G. Wynne, Jr.; Toddie Lee Wynne; William Zeckendorf; William Zeckendorf, Jr.
- Defunct: January 13, 1986; 40 years ago
- Fate: Merged with Six Flags
- Successor: GSC/Six Flags Corp.

The Great Southwest Corporation, officially abbreviated as GSC was a real estate development company established in January 1956 for the specific creation of the Great Southwest Industrial District. While developing the industrial district, they began work on a side-project, a theme park to be named Great Southwestland. By the time the park opened in 1961, it was renamed Six Flags Over Texas, which was a massive success, and caused the course of the company to shift, focusing on recreational real estate rather than industrial properties.

== History ==
=== 1950s: Development and Expansion ===
It was first reported on Friday, January 6, 1956, New York real estate developer William Zeckendorf and his son William Zeckendorf Jr. were in talks to purchase large pieces of land in the Arlington, Texas area. The Zeckendorfs arrived in Texas on the day of the reports, but were refused to confirm the rumors swirling of a large land purchase for an industrial complex. They were greeted at the airport by Jack Barr, Jr., of the Barr Construction Company, and Toddie Lee Wynne, president of the American Liberty Oil Company. Before the group could board their a private plane to take them to Matagorda Island, they were pushed for answers from the press. Zeckendorf declared any official comment would come from either Angus or Toddie Lee Wynne.

On Tuesday, January 10, 1956, it was announced Paul Waggoner was selling 2,500-acres of his portion of the Waggoner Ranch for $6 million to the newly created Great Southwest Corporation. The land was purchased for the rumored industrial park, and it was confirmed Zackendorf's firm Webb and Knapp and the Wynnes' American Home Realty Company would be associated with running the new corporation, with Angus G. Wynne Jr being named as the president. The first payment of $500,000 was presented to Waggoner with Angus Wynne's signature on the cashier's check. The industrial park was expected to employ 100,000 people.

On January 11, Milton L. Stern of Toronto, Canada, filed a lawsuit seeking a temporary restraining order against the development. Stern claimed to have to have come up with the initial idea of the industrial park, and was forced out by Barr and Zeckendorf. When asked for a comment by the Fort Worth Star-Telegram, Zeckendorf Jr said, "we have no moral or legal obligation to the man whatsoever." In his petition, Stern stated he obtained options on some of the land within the limits of the proposed development back on September 15, 1955. The petition stated he received a letter of intention from Zeckendorf Sr. on October 5, 1955. Though they never had a written contract, he considered the letter of intent binding. After 12 days of arguments Judge Paul Peurifoy rejected the $300 Million lawsuit, though held that Texas Industrial Ventures was entitled to repurchase within 60-days from Webb & Knapp six tracks of land involved for $18,000.

Construction on the first warehouse to make up the Great Southwest Industrial District commenced in 1956.

In July, it was announced Nelson, Laurance, David, Winthrop, and John D. Rockefeller III would join the Wynnes, and Webb & Knapp in developing the industrial park.

In November 1956, Wynne was pushing for a Private railway to be constructed for the new development. He said, "We felt that multiple rail service is so desirable for our tenants that, should it become necessary, we should provide it through a privately operated truck line railroad." Construction continued through 1957, and in June 1958 the Interstate Commerce Commission gave Wynne and the Great Southwest Corp permission to build its railroad. Great Southwest Corporation established Great Southwest Railroad, Inc., for its construction. The new line was built between the Industrial District connected to the Texas and Pacific Railway and the Chicago, Rock Island and Pacific Railroad.

Despite the addition of the new railroad, the Industrial Park struggled to succeed in selling retail and warehouse space to prospective businesses. In response Wynne conceived the idea of a nearby sports complex to draw in customers.

In April 1958, Great Southwest Corporation, Rockefeller Center, Inc., and Webb & Knapp presented to the public a large expansion that would feature a sports complex with a rifle range, driving range, bowling alley, and a theme park dubbed "Southwestland."

During the planning stages of the expansion, Arlington mayor Tom Vandergriff advised that Wynne and his family should visit the recently opened Disneyland in Anaheim, California. This visit inspired Wynne to change his plans, realizing he should build a park that celebrated Texas history. Under the leadership of Wynne, the Great Southwest Corporation hired former Disneyland vice-president Cornelius Vanderbilt Wood's firm Marco Engineering to help design the park.

=== 1960s: Theme Park Success and Pennsylvania Railroad Sale ===
In January 1960, Great Southwest announced its intention to issue $11,500,000 in stocks and debentures to finance the construction. By April, the new complex was under a news and advertising blackout after it was advised the U.S. Securities and Exchange Commission rules stated, "a publicity silence must be observed on ventures offering stock to the public." At the same time it was revealed very little progress had been made at the site aside from construction of the 32-lane bowling alley which was announced to be the first planned structure to be built.

Construction on the park, and the rest of the Great Southwest Sports Complex, began in August 1960. Wynne first intended to name the park "Texas Under Six Flags" until his wife notified him that "Texas ain't under nothing." The 'six flags' originally represented the six countries that have governed Texas: France, Spain, Mexico, The Republic of Texas, The Confederate States of America, and the United States of America. In February 1961, Wynne traveled to Mexico City to invite Mexican participation in the park. Wynne brought in Randall Duell, who had worked at Metro-Goldwyn-Mayer for 23-years designing and building film sets, Charlie Thompson another Disneyland alumnus, Charlie Meeker the former director of State Fair of Texas, and Joe Lambert who was experienced in Landscape lighting. All of the men were hired to ensure the park met Wynne's expectations.

When Six Flags Over Texas opened on August 5, 1961, it was a massive success bringing in 8,374 visitors opening day.

In 1962 Great Southwest posted its first profit since its inception in 1956, proving Wynne's gamble paid off.

In June 1964, it was announced Toddie Lee Wynne intended on selling his stake of the Great Southwest Corporation, rumors reported the Pennsylvania Railroad was interested. On June 25, 1964, Stuart Saunders a board member of the Pennsylvania Railroad, announced they had acquired the controlling stake in the company for an estimated $11-$12 million.

PRR replaced Toddie Lee Wynne, Sr., and Toddie Lee Wynne, Jr., on the board with Stuart T. Saunders, as Chairman of the Board, David C. Bevan, as chairman of its finance committee, W. R. Gerstnecker, as treasurer.

Following the sale, O.P. Corley, and George Thompson Jr both resigned from the Board of Directors.

In 1965, Wynne revealed the Great Southwest Corporation created a new wholly owned subsidiary the Great Southwest Atlanta Corporation. The new company had bought 3,000 acres of land for more than $3 million in the Atlanta area for a new theme park location, which would go on to be Six Flags Over Georgia.

Wynne subsequently expanded Six Flags in 1967 with a second original park, Six Flags Over Georgia, which is located just outside Atlanta, Georgia

=== 1970s: Bankruptcy, Fraud Investigation, and Merger ===
In July 1970, Angus G. Wynne, Jr. was promoted to president and chief executive officer, from the role of a chairman. Later that month Great Southwest Corp.'s parent company Penn Central Transportation Company applied to reorganize the company under bankruptcy laws. This resulted in Great Southwest having money difficulties because certain credit facilities have been terminated or suspended, and because other cash-producing operations were forced to cease temporarily.

In October 1970 Penn Central selected Victor Palmieri as Wynne's successor as president and chief executive officer. At the same time, Angus G. Wynne, Sr. and five other directors resigned from the Board of directors. A new board was established with Wynne, Jr., Palmieri, among others.

Wynne, Jr. along with three other executives were deposed from their positions with Great Southwest Corp. In November 1970 the company filed a suit in the Orange County, California Superior Court alleging the employees were overcompensated. It was claimed Wynne had been over paid by $3 million as part of a "cash incentive program." According to the suit, the contract establishing the incentive program wasn't valid. Wynne, Jr. was also accused of being too aggressive and expansionistic at a time when the company was suffering from liquidity problems. Wynne, Jr. and the other officers countersued the company alleging they were rightfully owed the money they were given, and won.

In 1975, Great Southwest Corp completed a $154 million debt restructuring to prevent filing for bankruptcy following the bankruptcy of its parent company Penn Central Transportation.

In September 1974, the U.S. Securities and Exchange Commission charged David C. Bevan, William R. Gerstnecker, and three others with fraud. Bevan and Gerstnecker were charged with misappropriating and illegally diverting part of a $100 million from July 1969 to November 1, 1970, as well as committing mail-fraud in an attempt to cover up their actions. Both men were acquitted in 1977, when judge John William Ditter Jr. dismissed the case.

In January 1979, Penn Central consolidated and restructured, merging Six Flags into Great Southwest Corp, instead of the former reporting to the latter. The new entity was named GSC/Six Flags Corp, headquartered out of Los Angeles the new company oversaw the theme parks, wax museums, and real estate properties. Bruce C. Juell who was president of Great Southwest Corp. was elected chairman and chief executive officer. Ned DeWitt II, vice president of Great Southwest, and president of Six Flags, was elected president of the new company.

=== 1980s: Six Flags Sale to Bally, and Closure ===
With the future uncertain, in 1980 the Great Southwest Association was formed by those inhabiting the Great Southwest Industrial District in Arlington, to maintain and upkeep the business park. The goal was to make improvements independently, without GSC/Six Flags.

Penn Central began talks of merging with Colt Industries, subsequently began looking to sell off subsidiaries including its recreation units. In September 1981, Bally Manufacturing signed a letter of intent to purchase Six Flags for roughly $140 million. The purchase resulted in the name reverting back to the Six Flags alone, and Great Southwest Corp continued selling off the properties in Arlington's industrial district. When the last available parcel of land was sold in January 1986, GSC was closed.

== Filmography ==
On July 20, 1977, the company established GSC/Six Flags Productions with the intention of producing films. In 1978, the company co-created two films, The Kid From Not-So-Big which starred Veronica Cartwright and Barnaby and Me.

The Kid From Not-So-Big was filmed in Los Angeles, California.

== See also ==
- Levitt & Sons
