= Great Southwest Industrial District =

Great SouthWest Industrial Park
- Location: Arlington and Grand Prairie, Texas
- Opening date: 1956
- Manager: Great Southwest Industrial District Association
- Size: 8,000+ acres

The Great Southwest Industrial District is a business park located in Southern Arlington and Grand Prairie, Texas. It was first conceived as a master-plan business park by American businessman Angus G. Wynne.

== History ==
The business park would be a conception of Angus Wynne which he devised due to the opportunity presented by the construction of the six-lane Dallas-Ft . Worth Turnpike, known today as Interstate 30, by the Texas Turnpike Authority in 1955.

=== Construction ===
Wynn and New York real estate tycoon William Zeckendorf purchased the 3D Ranch estate owned by Paul Waggoner which comprised approximately 2,387 acres. Wynn continued to buy additional surrounding land, as the pair would eventually own over 5,000 acres of land. At this time, Wynn would also create the Great Southwest Corporation to oversee the project and appoint himself president of the company. ' Construction would start in 1956 on what was the initial warehouse and by 1957 there were five buildings under construction across 750 acres of the industrial park land.

=== Growth ===
The business park was not an immediate success due to difficulty selling both retail and warehouse space to the prospective businesses. This would change with the opening of Six Flags Over Texas in August 1961. This would increase interest in the industry park, as the number of spaces leased increased ninefold, and the Great Southwest Corporation would post a profit for the first time in its history.

=== Present Day ===
In 2014 the industrial park consisted of more than 8000 acres and was assessed to be worth 41.2 billion dollars. The largest landholder in 2013 was General Motors.

In August 2021, Westmount Reality Capital LLC sold their asset Fountain Parkway, a 301,399 square-foot warehouse and manufacturing facility spread over 14 acres.

In November 2020 Optimal Elite Management LLC, which manufactures LED signs, purchased a 63,000 square feet of office and warehouse space. They would complete their plans to move their corporate headquarters to the industrial park from Los Angeles in 2021.

Today it remains the largest industrial park in North Texas with 82,227,715 square feet of space spread across 7000 acres.

== Railroad ==
The Great Southwest Corporation charted a terminal and switching railroad called the Great South-west Railroad on May 7, 1957, to provide switching services to the industrial park. It connected to two different railroad main lines, the Texas and Pacific railroad to the South and the Chicago, Rock Island and Pacific to the North. s The Great Southwest Corporation would sell $90 of its interest in the railroad to both the Texas and Pacific and Chicago, Rock Island, and Pacific rail companies splitting that interest equally between the two companies. Texas and Pacific were later purchased by the Missouri Pacific, who in turn was purchased current owners of the trackage, Union Pacific Corporation, the parent company of Union Pacific Railroad.

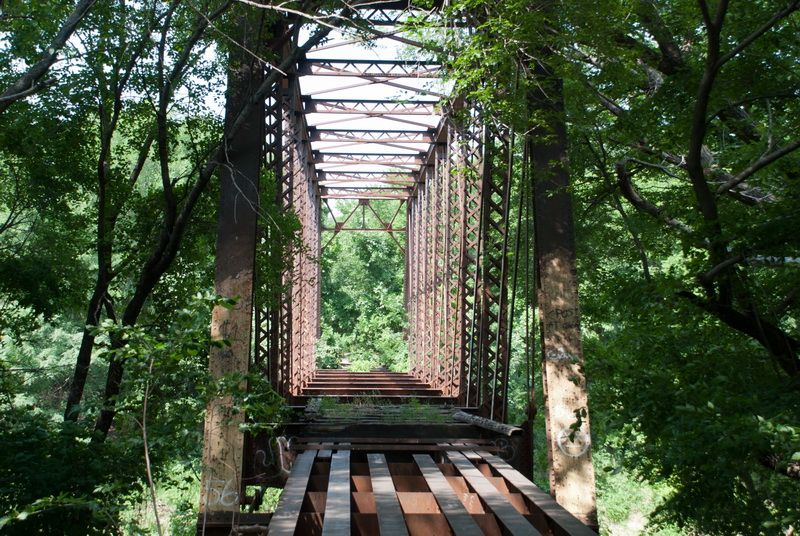
Great SouthWest bridge crossing the Trinity River

Parts of the line remain in use by Union Pacific who continues to serve the businesses within the industrial park. The connection to the Northern line, now owned by the Trinity River Express, has been severed although remnants still remain including an old trestle bridge across the Trinity River.
