= Jim Reid-Anderson =

British businessman and former CEO of Six Flags Entertainment Corporation

- Born: 12 April 1959 (age 67); Baghdad, Iraq
- Education: University of Birmingham; Salesian College

James Reid-Anderson (born 12 April 1959) is a British businessman who was formerly the president, chairman, and chief executive officer (CEO) of Six Flags Entertainment Corporation. Before working for Six Flags, Anderson was previously a healthcare adviser to both Apollo and the managing board of Siemens AG. Under Reid-Anderson, Siemens acquired Dade Behring.

He succeeded interim CEO Al Weber Jr. in August 2010, who led the corporate restructuring of the company following its Chapter 11 bankruptcy and the ousting of former executives Mark Shapiro and Daniel Snyder. Under his first period of leadership, Six Flags' market value increased eight-fold through a period of high guest and employee satisfaction ratings, improved operations, and a ten-fold return for shareholders.

He held the position until February 2016, before being reinstated in 2017 following the sudden departure of his successor, John Duffey. During his second tenure, Six Flags re-acquired many of its former properties that had been sold off to other companies, including Six Flags Darien Lake, Frontier City, and Six Flags Hurricane Harbor SplashTown, among others.

== Personal life ==
Jim Reid-Anderson was born in Baghdad in 1959 but left to Beirut soon after due to the 14 July Revolution. He grew up in Lebanon, Guyana, and later London, where he was educated at Salesian College, Battersea. He obtained an Honors Degree in Commerce from the University of Birmingham in England and is a Fellow of the UK Association of Chartered Certified Accountants. He is married with four children.

== Career ==
=== Early career ===
His early career involved stints at Mobil, Tricentrol, Grand Met/Diageo, PepsiCo and Wilson Sporting Goods, living in various parts of the world including Cyprus, Singapore and the US.

=== Dade Behring/Siemens ===
In 1996, Reid-Anderson joined Dade Behring Holdings Inc., a company which manufactured testing equipment and supplies for the medical diagnostics industry, as executive vice-president and chief financial officer (CFO) and later became chief administrative officer and CFO in September 1997. In April 1999, he was promoted to the role of president and chief operating officer and then CEO in September 2000. He was elected as the chairman of the board in October 2002.

In 2005, Reid-Anderson was a finalist in the Smart Business Chicago Entrepreneur of the Year awards and was later named in the British Sunday Times as the 22nd most influential Briton in the US

In 2007, Dade Behring was acquired by the German conglomerate Siemens AG. In November 2007, Reid-Anderson became the CEO of Siemens Healthcare Diagnostics and in May 2008, became a member of Siemens AG's managing board and CEO of Siemens Healthcare Sector. In 2009 he became a director of Stericycle Inc, an Illinois-based waste management company.

=== Six Flags ===
On 12 August 2010, Jim Reid-Anderson was named chairman, president and chief executive officer (CEO) of Six Flags Entertainment Corporation. The success of Dade Behring led investors to appoint him to this role, and their belief in him was rewarded as the company saw six record years in a row from a financial, guest and employee satisfaction perspective.

Reid-Anderson was succeeded by John M. Duffey as chairman, president, and CEO in 2016, but moved into the role of executive chairman on 19 February 2016, allowing others in the organisation to move up into senior roles. He continued to have a role in key strategic matters at the company, including governance, M&A, and international and organizational development.

On 18 July 2017, Six Flags announced that its board of directors had appointed Jim Reid-Anderson, who had been serving as executive chairman of the company since February 2016, to re-assume his position as the company's chairman, president and CEO, effective immediately. Reid-Anderson succeeded John M. Duffey, who had suddenly resigned from the company for unknown personal reasons. Reid-Anderson had formerly served as chairman, president and CEO of Six Flags from August 2010 through February 2016.

On 24 October 2019, Six Flags announced that on 18 November 2019, Reid-Anderson would resign and be replaced with Michael Spanos, a chief executive officer of a division of PepsiCo, effective immediately.
