= Toddie Lee Wynne =

American real estate developer (1896–1982)

Toddie Lee Wynne Sr.
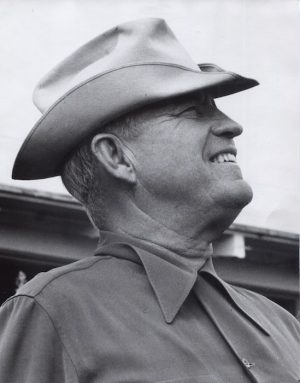
- Born: November 28, 1896
- Died: September 6, 1982 (aged 85)
- Burial place: Sparkman Hillcrest Memorial Park Cemetery
- Other name: Fat Dad
- Occupations: Real estate developer & oil investor

Toddie Lee Wynne Sr. (1896-1982) was a Dallas-based real estate developer and oil investor who was best known for his funding the first private rocket to space, in being a co-developer of Six Flags Over Texas, and in helping to bring Tex-Mex food to the United States. Wynne grew up in Dallas, where he graduated from the Terrill School for Boys, which later became St. Mark's School of Texas. Much of Wynne's business involvements involved partnerships, generally with family members and with Clint Murchison Jr.

Wynne's real estate involvements were far flung. These included the development (with his nephew Angus Wynne Jr. and/or his son, Toddie Jr.) of Wynnewood Village and the Plaza of the Americas complex, which are both in Dallas, as well as the nearby Six Flags Over Texas. He also built hotels in Malta, Bali and Hong Kong.

Wynne was the long-time president of the American Liberty Oil Company, which he bought from his partner, Murchison. Wynne and Murchison were also partners in a string of racehorses.

Wynne’s son and his cousin, Bedford Wynne, were minority shareholders when the Dallas Cowboys were granted an NFL franchise in 1961 (Murchison was the majority shareholder).

The Wynne family's involvement in Tex Mex food stems from their development of the Six Flags theme park in 1961. The "six flags" refer to the 6 countries that have held power in Texas: Spain, France, The Confederacy, Texas, United States, and Mexico. The Mexican section of the park included a Mexican restaurant, El Chico, whose owners—the Cuellars—had been feeding the Wynne family in Kaufman Texas since 1928. This theme park restaurant is credited with introducing tacos, enchiladas, and guacamole to a broad American audience.

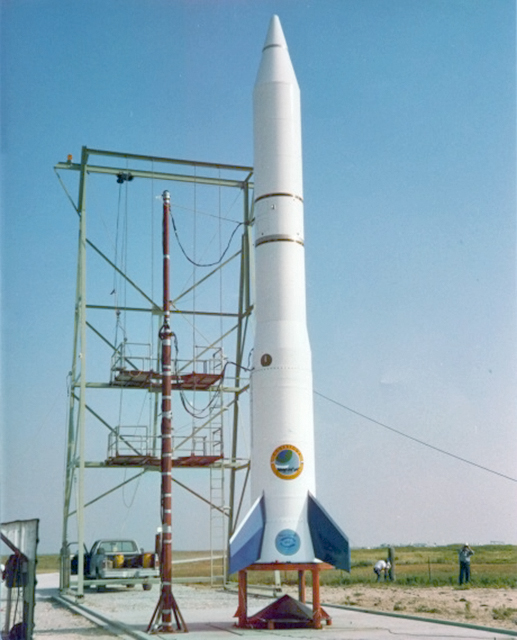
Conestoga I prepared for launch on Wynne's land.

As one of Space Services Inc.'s (SSI) main financial backers, Wynne financed much of the costs associated with sending the first privately held rocket to space, in 1982. SSI's Conestoga I rocket took off on September 9, 1982, from his third of Matagorda Island, which lies off the coast of Texas and which was co-owned with the U.S. government and the state of Texas. The rocket flew 65 miles straight up, which was its goal, but Wynne had a heart attack while waiting for the launch and died en route to a hospital in Dallas.
