= Haiyan County, Zhejiang =

Haiyan 海盐县 Haiyen
- County
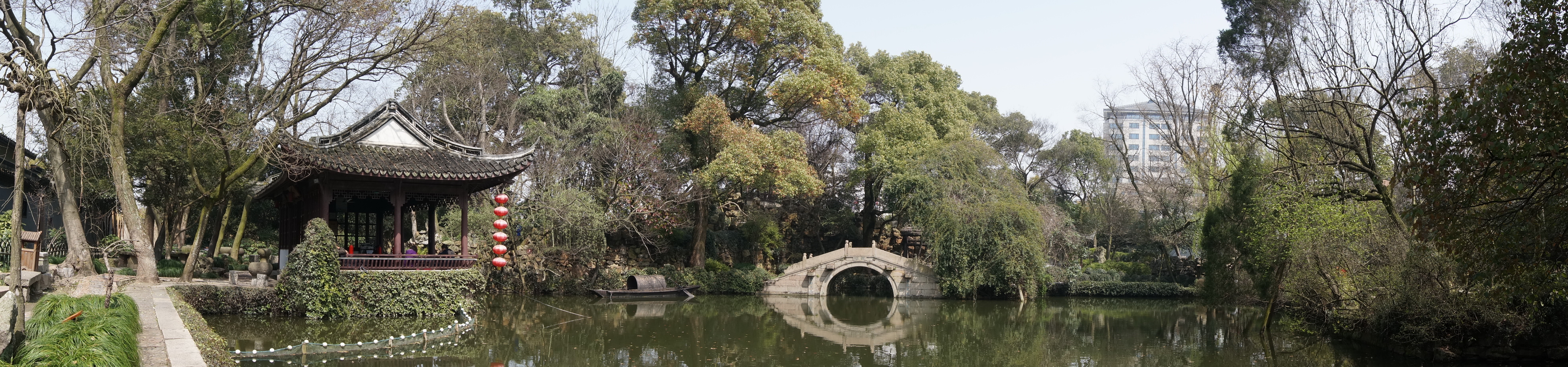
- Qi Garden of Haiyan

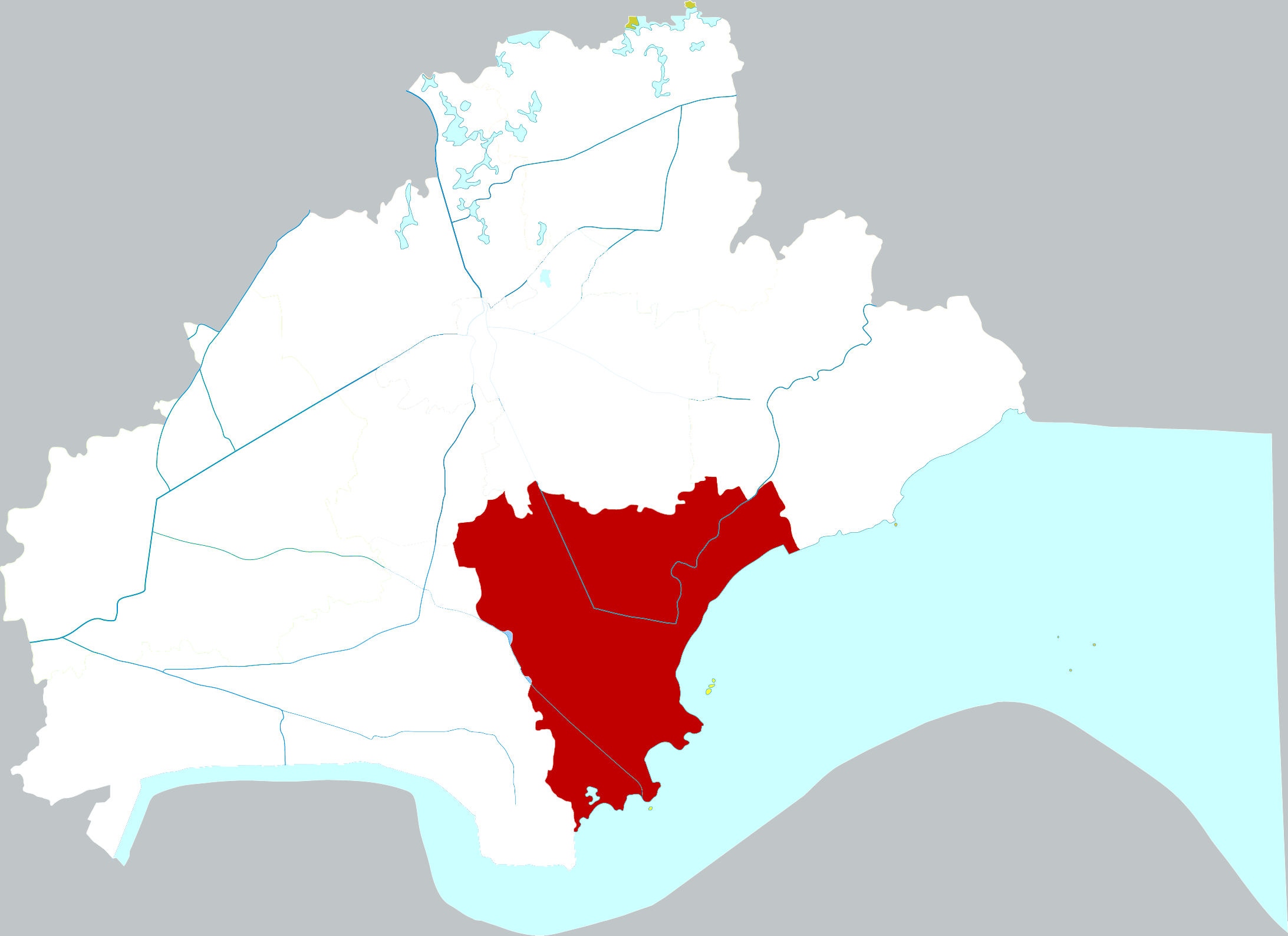
- Location of Haiyan County within Jiaxing

- Location of the county seat in Zhejiang
- Coordinates: 30°31′N 120°57′E
- Country: People's Republic of China
- Province: Zhejiang
- Prefecture-level city: Jiaxing

Area
  - Total: 584.96 km^{2} (225.85 sq mi)

Population (2020)
  - Total: 456,775
  - Density: 780.87/km^{2} (2,022.4/sq mi)
- Time zone: UTC+8 (China Standard)
- Area code: (0)573
- Website: www.haiyan.gov.cn

Haiyan County (simplified Chinese: 海盐县; traditional Chinese: 海鹽縣; pinyin: Hǎiyán Xiàn) is a county under the administration of Jiaxing City, in the north of Zhejiang province, China, situated on the north shore of Hangzhou Bay and includes the north end of the Hangzhou Bay Bridge.

Its area is 503 km^{2} (194 sq mi). Population is 370,000. Postal code: 314300.

The county government is located on 118 Zaoyuan Middle Rd, Wuyuan town.

In August 2010, Haiyan was selected to house the 'Nuclear City'. China will reportedly spend some €130 billion over the next ten years on developing the 130 square-kilometer Haiyan Nuclear City, which will be needed by local industry. By 2014, nine nuclear power plants should be in operation, with electrical generating capacity of around 6300 MWe, which will help reduce the country's carbon footprint.

In September 2015, Six Flags and Riverside Group announced that they would build the first international Six Flags theme park in Haiyan County, Zhejiang.

== Administrative divisions ==
Subdistricts:

- Wuyuan Subdistrict (武原街道), Qinshan Subdistrict (秦山街道), Xitangqiao Subdistrict (西塘桥街道), Yuantong Subdistrict (元通街道)

Towns:

- Shendang (沈荡镇), Tongyuan (通元镇), Chepu (澉浦镇), Yucheng (于城镇), Baibu (百步镇)

== Climate ==
Climate data for Haiyan, elevation 5 m (16 ft), (1991–2020 normals, extremes 1981–2010)
Month	Jan	Feb	Mar	Apr	May	Jun	Jul	Aug	Sep	Oct	Nov	Dec	Year
Record high °C (°F)	22.4 (72.3)	27.7 (81.9)	30.7 (87.3)	32.3 (90.1)	35.8 (96.4)	37.9 (100.2)	39.1 (102.4)	39.4 (102.9)	37.8 (100.0)	34.6 (94.3)	28.7 (83.7)	24.1 (75.4)	39.4 (102.9)
Mean daily maximum °C (°F)	8.2 (46.8)	10.1 (50.2)	14.1 (57.4)	19.7 (67.5)	24.8 (76.6)	27.7 (81.9)	32.5 (90.5)	32.1 (89.8)	28.0 (82.4)	23.1 (73.6)	17.4 (63.3)	11.0 (51.8)	20.7 (69.3)
Daily mean °C (°F)	4.8 (40.6)	6.5 (43.7)	10.3 (50.5)	15.7 (60.3)	21.0 (69.8)	24.5 (76.1)	28.9 (84.0)	28.7 (83.7)	24.6 (76.3)	19.3 (66.7)	13.5 (56.3)	7.2 (45.0)	17.1 (62.8)
Mean daily minimum °C (°F)	2.1 (35.8)	3.7 (38.7)	7.3 (45.1)	12.4 (54.3)	17.8 (64.0)	22.0 (71.6)	26.0 (78.8)	25.9 (78.6)	21.7 (71.1)	16.0 (60.8)	10.2 (50.4)	4.2 (39.6)	14.1 (57.4)
Record low °C (°F)	−7.0 (19.4)	−5.7 (21.7)	−2.8 (27.0)	1.9 (35.4)	9.5 (49.1)	13.2 (55.8)	19.1 (66.4)	18.7 (65.7)	14.0 (57.2)	2.9 (37.2)	−2.9 (26.8)	−8.7 (16.3)	−8.7 (16.3)
Average precipitation mm (inches)	84.4 (3.32)	79.1 (3.11)	115.9 (4.56)	94.6 (3.72)	115.4 (4.54)	232.7 (9.16)	154.8 (6.09)	193.7 (7.63)	121.1 (4.77)	69.0 (2.72)	67.8 (2.67)	59.2 (2.33)	1,387.7 (54.62)
Average precipitation days (≥ 0.1 mm)	12.3	11.6	13.9	13.2	12.2	15.2	11.4	12.5	10.7	7.7	9.5	9.0	139.2
Average snowy days	2.9	2.1	0.6	0	0	0	0	0	0	0	0.2	1.0	6.8
Average relative humidity (%)	78	78	78	77	77	83	79	80	79	77	78	76	78
Mean monthly sunshine hours	105.6	110.0	131.3	148.8	163.3	130.7	216.1	211.9	163.0	159.7	128.3	124.4	1,793.1
Percentage possible sunshine	33	35	35	38	38	31	50	52	44	46	41	40	40
Source: China Meteorological Administration
