= 2011 in amusement parks =

This is a list of events and openings related to amusement parks that occurred in 2011. These various lists are not exhaustive.

== Amusement parks ==
=== Opening ===
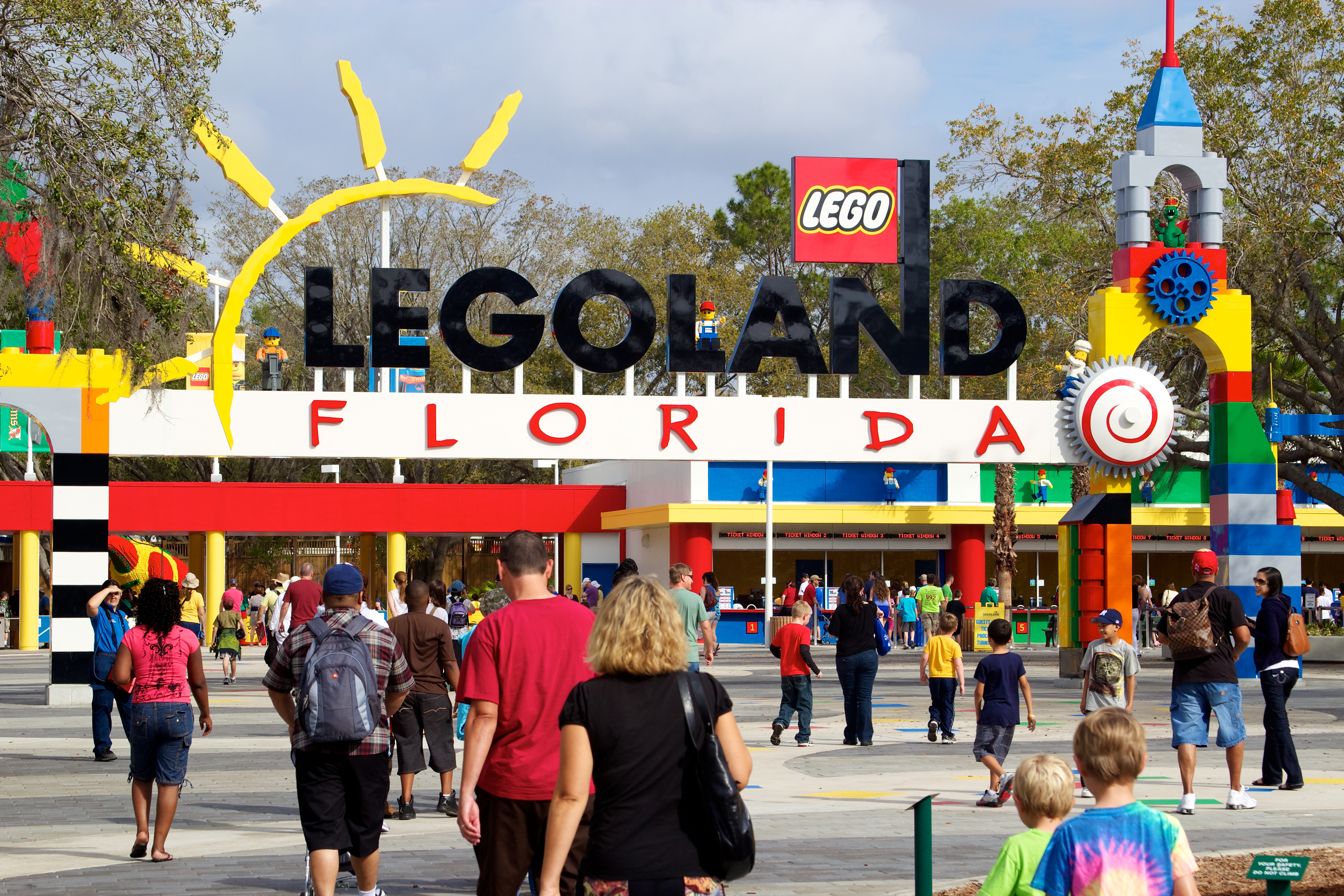
Legoland Florida opened in October

- Legoland Florida - October 15, replaced the former Cypress Gardens
- Rainbow MagicLand - May 26
- Trans Studio Bandung - June 18

=== Change of name ===
- Geauga Lake's Wildwater Kingdom » Wildwater Kingdom
- Walibi World » Walibi Holland

=== Change of ownership ===
- Darien Lake - PARC Management » Herschend Family Entertainment
- Elitch Gardens - PARC Management » Herschend Family Entertainment

=== Birthday ===
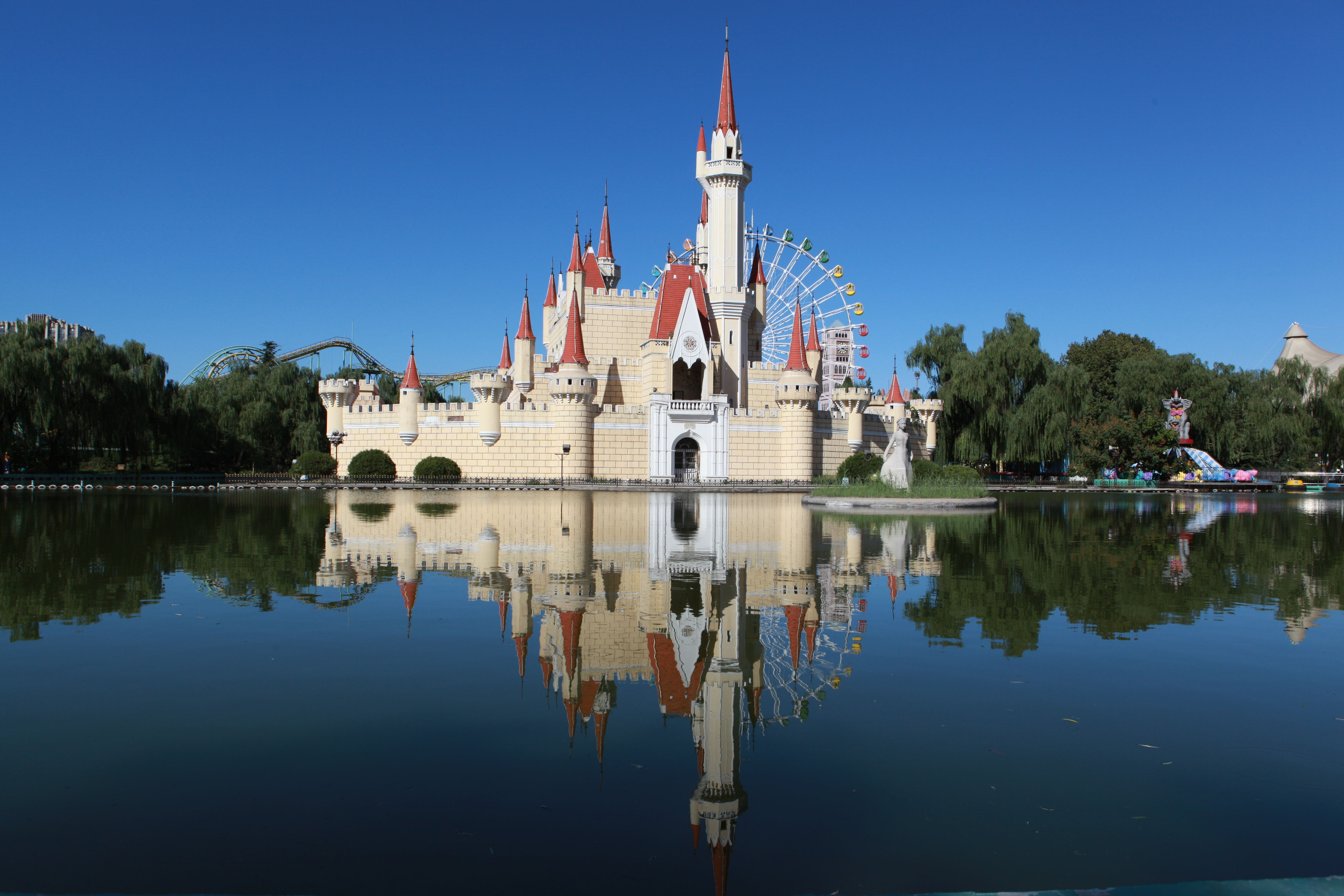
Beijing Shijingshan Amusement Park celebrates its 25th anniversary in September

Dreamworld celebrates its 30th anniversary throughout the year

- Beijing Shijingshan Amusement Park - 25th birthday
- California's Great America - 35th birthday
- Walt Disney World Resort - 40th birthday
- Canada Canada's Wonderland - 30th birthday
- Disney California Adventure - 10th birthday
- Dreamworld - 30th birthday
- Lagoon Amusement Park - 125th birthday
- Magic Kingdom - 40th birthday
- Michigan's Adventure - 55th birthday
- Toverland - 10th birthday
- Six Flags Great America - 35th birthday
- Six Flags Magic Mountain - 40th birthday
- Six Flags Over Texas - 50th birthday
- Six Flags St. Louis - 40th birthday
- Australia Sea World - 40th birthday
- Valleyfair - 35th birthday
- Warner Bros. Movie World - 20th birthday
- WhiteWater World - 5th birthday

=== Closed ===
- Escape Theme Park - November 26
- Wannado City - January 2
- NASCAR Cafe - May 1
- Storyland
- Yongma Land

== Additions ==
=== Roller coasters ===
==== New ====
Name	Park	Type	Manufacturer	Opened
Ben 10 - Ultimate Mission	England Drayton Manor Theme Park	Junior Boomerang	Vekoma	April 21
BuzzSaw	Australia Dreamworld	SkyLoop	Maurer Söhne	September 17
Cheetah Hunt	United States Busch Gardens Tampa Bay	LSM Launch	Intamin	May 27
Dare Devil Dive	United States Six Flags Over Georgia	Euro-Fighter	Gerstlauer	May 28
Green Lantern Coaster	Australia Warner Bros. Movie World	El Loco	S&S Worldwide	December 23
Green Lantern: First Flight	United States Six Flags Magic Mountain	Zacspin	Intamin	July 1
Hair Raiser	People's Republic of China Ocean Park Hong Kong	Floorless Coaster	Bolliger & Mabillard	December 8
Krake	Germany Heide Park	Dive Coaster	Bolliger & Mabillard	April 16
Mountain Peak	People's Republic of China Jinjiang Action Park	Giant Inverted Boomerang	Vekoma	September 30
New Texas Giant	United States Six Flags Over Texas	Steel roller coaster	Rocky Mountain Construction	April 22
Raptor	Italy Gardaland	Wing Coaster	Bolliger & Mabillard	April 1
RC Racer	People's Republic of China Hong Kong Disneyland	Half Pipe roller coaster	Intamin	November 17
Sky Scrapper	People's Republic of China World Joyland	Flying Coaster	Bolliger & Mabillard	April 30
Takabisha	Japan Fuji-Q Highland	Euro-Fighter	Gerstlauer	July 16
Timber Drop	France Fraispertuis City	El Loco	S&S Worldwide	July 2
Untamed	United States Canobie Lake Park	Euro-Fighter	Gerstlauer	June 11
Van Helsing's Factory	Germany Movie Park Germany	Bobsled Coaster	Gerstlauer	June 18

==== Relocated ====
Name	Park	Type	Manufacturer	Opened	Formerly
Astro Storm	England Brean Leisure Park	Enclosed	Zierer	July 23	Space Invader 2 at Pleasure Beach Blackpool
Black Diamond	United States Knoebels	Family roller coaster	Philadelphia Toboggan Company	October 10	Gold Nugget at Dinosaur Beach
Cosmic Coaster	United States Valleyfair	Kiddie	Zamperla	May 14	Dragon Coaster at Dorney Park & Wildwater Kingdom
Gotham City Gauntlet: Escape from Arkham Asylum	United States Six Flags New England	Wild Mouse	Maurer Söhne	April 16	Road Runner Express at Kentucky Kingdom
Green Lantern	United States Six Flags Great Adventure	Stand-up	Bolliger & Mabillard	May 25	Chang at Kentucky Kingdom
Lego Technic Test Track	United States Legoland Florida	Wild Mouse	Mack Rides	October 15	Jungle Coaster at Legoland Windsor
Road Runner Express	United States Six Flags Magic Mountain	Junior	Vekoma	May 28	Road Runner Express at Six Flags New Orleans
Soarin' Eagle	United States Scream Zone	Flying	Zamperla	April	Flying Coaster at Elitch Gardens
Tiger Express	France Mer de Sable	Wild Mouse	Mack Rides	June 26	Flying Dutchman Gold Mine at Walibi Holland
Zippin Pippin	United States Bay Beach Amusement Park	Wooden	The Gravity Group	May 21	Zippin Pippin at Libertyland

==== Refurbished ====
Name	Park	Type	Manufacturer	Opened	Formerly
Apocalypse	United States Six Flags Magic Mountain	Wooden roller coaster	Great Coasters International	January 8	Terminator Salvation: The Ride
Flying School	United States Legoland Florida	Suspended Family Coaster	Vekoma	October 15	Swamp Thing at Cypress Gardens
Goofy's Sky School	United States Disney California Adventure	Wild Mouse	Mack Rides	July 1	Mulholland Madness
Sky Rocket	Australia Dreamworld	Suspended Family Coaster	Vekoma	June 25	Rugrats Runaway Reptar
Superman: Escape from Krypton	United States Six Flags Magic Mountain	Launched shuttle roller coaster	Intamin	March 19	Superman: The Escape

=== Other attractions ===
==== New ====
Name	Park	Type	Opened
AtmosFear	Sweden Lisberg	Drop tower	April
Barnstormer	United States Dollywood	Screamin' Swing	March 28
Beach Party	United States WildWater Adventure	Children's Play Area	May
Cheetah Run	United States Busch Gardens Tampa Bay	Cheetah exhibit	May 27
Dinosaurs Alive!	United States Kings Island	Animatronic dinosaur exhibit	May 26
Dora's Best Friends Adventure	Australia Sea World	Live show	December 17
DreamWorks Holiday Shrektacular	Australia Dreamworld	Live show	December 19
Dreamworld Cinema	Australia Dreamworld	Movie theater	January 6
Fantasmic!	Japan Tokyo DisneySea	Nighttime spectacular	April 28
Flying Swings SS Wally Wendy's Tea Party	United States Waldameer & Water World	Zamperla Wave Swinger, Rockin' Tug, and Teacups	May 7
Giant Slide	Australia Aussie World	Giant Slide	September
"it"	United States Morey's Piers	Pendulum ride	Summer 2011
Jasmine's Flying Carpets	Japan Tokyo DisneySea	Aerial carousel	July 18
Kid's World	Australia Dreamworld	Themed area	June 25
KIDZOPOLIS	United States Great Escape; United States Six Flags Fiesta Texas; United States Six Flags Great America; United States Six Flags New England	Themed area	May 21; March 5 May 7 April 16
The Lair	Australia Dreamworld	Exotic animal exhibit	April 9
The Little Mermaid: Ariel's Undersea Adventure	United States Disney California Adventure	Dark ride	June 3
Madagascar: A Crate Adventure	Singapore Universal Studios Singapore	Water ride	May 16
Maus au Chocolat	Germany Phantasialand	Interactive Dark Ride	June 9
Marvin the Martian in the Third Dimension	England Drayton Manor Theme Park	3D film	March 19
Mäch Tower	United States Busch Gardens Williamsburg	Drop tower	August 18
Mickey's PhilharMagic	Japan Tokyo Disneyland	3D film	January 24
Nickelodeon Land	England Pleasure Beach Blackpool	Themed area	May 4
Pixie Hollow	People's Republic of China Hong Kong Disneyland	Meet and greet	January 21
Planet Snoopy	United States Dorney Park & Wildwater Kingdom; United States Valleyfair; United States Worlds of Fun	Themed Area	May 4 May 14; April 16
Plunge	Australia Aussie World	Log flume	December 7
Raveleijn	Netherlands Efteling	Theater attraction	April 7
Redback	Australia Aussie World	Zamperla Disk'O	April 1
Riptide Bay	United States Six Flags Hurricane Harbor Chicago	Themed area	June 3
Shockwave	Australia Dreamworld	Zamperla Disk'O	June 25
SkyCoaster	Australia Wet'n'Wild Water World	Skycoaster	March 9
SkyScreamer	United States Six Flags Discovery Kingdom; United States Six Flags St. Louis	Tower swing ride	May 25; May 14
Slinky Dog Zig Zag Spin	People's Republic of China Hong Kong Disneyland	Caterpillar ride	November 17
SpongeBob SquarePants 4-D	Australia Sea World	3D film	Unknown
SpongeBob ParadePants	Australia Sea World	Parade	December 17
Starlight Spectacular	Canada Canada's Wonderland	Nighttime show	June 25
Star Tours–The Adventures Continue	United States Disneyland; United States Disney's Hollywood Studios	3D Motion simulator	June 3 May 20
Storm Surge	England Thorpe Park	Water ride	March 17
Terminator X: A Laser Battle for Salvation	Mexico Six Flags México	Laser tag	February 3
Tikal	Germany Phantasialand	Family Drop tower	April 1
Toy Soldier Parachute Drop	People's Republic of China Hong Kong Disneyland	Parachute tower	November 17
Transformers: The Ride	Singapore Universal Studios Singapore	Dark ride	December 3
Walt Disney's Enchanted Tiki Room	United States Magic Kingdom	Theater attraction	August 15
Whistlestop Park	United States Six Flags America; United States Six Flags Magic Mountain; United States Six Flags Over Georgia	Themed area	April 16; March 19; March 19
Wild Africa Trek	United States Disney's Animal Kingdom	Guided Tour	January 15
WindSeeker	Canada Canada's Wonderland; United States Cedar Point; United States Kings Island; United States Knott's Berry Farm	Tower swing ride	May 24; June 14; June 21; August 18
Zip Lines	Australia Wet'n'Wild Water World	3 Zip lines	April
The magic, memories, and you!	US Magic Kingdom and Disneyland park	Projection show	January (MK) Unknown (DL)

== Closed attractions & roller coasters ==
Name	Park	Type	Closed	Manufacturer	Ref
Déjà Vu	United States Six Flags Magic Mountain	Giant Inverted Boomerang	October 16	Vekoma	
Family Adventure	Italy Mirabilandia	Junior roller coaster	November 1	Vekoma	
Tornado	Denmark Sommerland Syd	Invertigo	Unknown	Vekoma	
Iron Wolf	United States Six Flags Great America	Stand-up roller coaster	September 5	Bolliger & Mabillard	
Rampage	United States Alabama Adventure	Wooden roller coaster	Unknown	Custom Coasters International	
Speed – The Ride	United States NASCAR Cafe	Launched roller coaster	May 1	Premier Rides	
WildCat	United States Cedar Point	Wild mouse roller coaster	October 30	Anton Schwarzkopf	
Zoomberang	United States Alabama Adventure	Boomerang	Unknown	Vekoma	
Batman Adventure – The Ride	Australia Warner Bros. Movie World	Motion simulator	October 15		
East River Crawler	United States Six Flags Great America	Anton Schwarzkopf (Monster III)	October 30		
The Crypt	United States Kings Island	Giant Top Spin	October 30		
Falling Star	United States Michigan's Adventure		Unknown		
Happy Feet 3-D Experience	Australia Sea World	3D film	Unknown		
Happy Feet 4-D Experience	United States Moody Gardens	4D film	January 1		
Hot Summer Lights	United States Cedar Point	Nighttime show	Unknown		
Ikarus	Italy Gardaland	Condor	November 1		
Jimmy Neutron's Nicktoon Blast	United States Universal Studios Florida	Motion simulator	August 19		
Log Jammer	United States Six Flags Magic Mountain	Log flume	October 31		
Looney Tunes River Ride	Australia Warner Bros. Movie World	Water ride	February 1		
Mickey's Country House	United States Magic Kingdom	Walk Through	February 12		
Nickelodeon Central	Australia Dreamworld	Themed Area	June 24		
Paddlewheel Excursions	United States Cedar Point	Boat ride	September 5		
Pitt Fall	United States Kennywood	Gyro Drop	September		
Shipwreck Falls	United States Six Flags New England	Water ride	September 5		
Skull Mountain	United States Six Flags America	Log Flume	July 10		
Stonewash Creek	Germany Phantasialand	Log Flume	November 6	Mack Rides	
Tak Attack	United States Nickelodeon Universe	Rotoshake	November 14		
Texas Splashdown	United States Sea World San Antonio	Log flume	May 13		
The Enchanted Tiki Room (Under New Management)	United States Magic Kingdom	Theater attraction	January 12		
Universal 360: A Cinesphere Spectacular	United States Universal Studios Florida	Nighttime Fireworks show	September 9		
Wagon Wheel	United States Six Flags Fiesta Texas	Enterprise	Unknown		
Wildwash Creek	Germany Phantasialand	Log Flume	November 6	Mack Rides	

== Amusement parks in terms of attendance ==
=== Worldwide ===
This section list the top 25 largest amusement parks worldwide in order of annual attendance in 2011.

Rank	Amusement park	Location	2011 Attendance
1	Magic Kingdom at Walt Disney World Resort	Lake Buena Vista, Florida, US	17,142,000
2	Disneyland at Disneyland Resort	Anaheim, California, US	16,140,000
3	Tokyo Disneyland	Tokyo, Japan	13,996,000
4	Tokyo DisneySea	Tokyo, Japan	11,930,000
5	Disneyland Park at Disneyland Paris	Marne-la-Vallée, France	10,990,000
6	Epcot at Walt Disney World Resort	Lake Buena Vista, Florida, US	10,825,000
7	Disney's Animal Kingdom at Walt Disney World Resort	Lake Buena Vista, Florida, US	9,783,000
8	Disney's Hollywood Studios at Walt Disney World Resort	Lake Buena Vista, Florida, US	9,699,000
9	Universal Studios Japan	Osaka, Japan	8,500,000
10	Islands of Adventure at Universal Orlando Resort	Orlando, Florida, US	7,674,000
11	Lotte World	Seoul, South Korea	7,580,000
12	Ocean Park Hong Kong	Hong Kong, China	6,955,000
13	Everland	Yongin, Gyeonggi-Do, South Korea	6,570,000
14	Disney California Adventure at Disneyland Resort	Anaheim, California, US	6,341,000
15	Universal Studios Florida at Universal Orlando Resort	Orlando, Florida, US	6,044,000
16	Hong Kong Disneyland	Hong Kong, China	5,900,000
17	Nagashima Spa Land	Kuwana, Japan	5,820,000
18	SeaWorld Orlando	Orlando, Florida, US	5,202,000
19	Universal Studios Hollywood	Universal City, California, US	5,141,000
20	Walt Disney Studios Park at Disneyland Paris	Marne-la-Vallée, France	4,710,000
21	Europa-Park	Rust, Germany	4,500,000
22	SeaWorld San Diego	San Diego, California, US	4,294,000
23	Busch Gardens Tampa Bay	Tampa, Florida, US	4,284,000
24	Efteling	Kaatsheuvel, Netherlands	4,125,000
25	Tivoli Gardens	Copenhagen, Denmark	3,963,000

== Poll rankings ==
=== Golden Ticket Awards ===
The 2011 Amusement Today Golden Ticket Awards were held at Holiday World & Splashin' Safari in Santa Claus, Indiana.

Category	2011 Recipient	Location	Vote
Best New Ride (Amusement park)	New Texas Giant	Six Flags Over Texas	45%
Best New Ride (Water park)	The Falls	Schlitterbahn	45%
Best Amusement park	Cedar Point	Sandusky, Ohio	23%
Best Water park	Schlitterbahn	New Braunfels, Texas	66%
Best Children's Park	Idlewild and Soak Zone	Ligonier, Pennsylvania	30%
Best Marine Park	SeaWorld Orlando	Orlando, Florida	55%
Best Seaside Park	Santa Cruz Beach Boardwalk	Santa Cruz, California	29%
Best Indoor Water park	Schlitterbahn Galveston Island	Galveston, Texas	31%
Friendliest Park	Holiday World & Splashin' Safari	Santa Claus, Indiana	32%
Cleanest Park	Holiday World & Splashin' Safari	Santa Claus, Indiana	35%
Best Shows	Dollywood	Pigeon Forge, Tennessee	30%
Best Food	Knoebels Amusement Resort	Elysburg, Pennsylvania	29%
Best Water Ride (Park)	Dudley Do-Right's Ripsaw Falls	Islands of Adventure	26%
Best Water Park Ride	Wildebeest	Holiday World & Splashin' Safari	34%
Best Kids' Area	Kings Island	Mason, Ohio	30%
Best Dark ride	Harry Potter and the Forbidden Journey	Islands of Adventure	26%
Best Outdoor Show Production	Epcot	Orlando, Florida	34%
Best Landscaping	Busch Gardens Williamsburg	Williamsburg, Virginia	33%
Best Halloween Event	Universal Orlando Resort	Orlando, Florida	32%
Best Christmas Event	Dollywood	Pigeon Forge, Tennessee	38%
Best Carousel	Knoebels Amusement Resort	Elysburg, Pennsylvania	55%
Best Indoor Coaster	Revenge of the Mummy	Universal Studios Orlando	31%
Best Funhouse/Walk-Through Attraction	Noah's Ark	Kennywood	24%

Top 10 Steel Roller Coasters
Rank	Roller Coaster	Park	Manufacturer	Points
1	Millennium Force	Cedar Point	Intamin	1540
2	Bizarro	Six Flags New England	Intamin	1201
3	Nitro	Six Flags Great Adventure	B&M	864
4	Goliath	Six Flags Over Georgia	B&M	794
5	Phantom's Revenge	Kennywood	Morgan/Arrow	756
6	New Texas Giant	Six Flags Over Texas	Rocky Mountain	743
7	Apollo's Chariot	Busch Gardens Williamsburg	B&M	643
7	Expedition GeForce	Holiday Park	Intamin	643
9	Top Thrill Dragster	Cedar Point	Intamin	627
10	Magnum XL-200	Cedar Point	Arrow	510

Top 10 Wooden Roller Coasters
Rank	Roller Coaster	Park	Manufacturer	Points
1	The Voyage	United States Holiday World & Splashin' Safari	The Gravity Group	1631
2	Phoenix	United States Knoebels Amusement Resort	PTC/Schmeck	1375
3	El Toro	United States Six Flags Great Adventure	Intamin	1359
4	Boulder Dash	United States Lake Compounce	CCI	1267
5	Thunderhead	United States Dollywood	GCI	1065
6	Ravine Flyer II	United States Waldameer & Water World	The Gravity Group	969
7	The Beast	United States Kings Island	KECO	591
8	Hades	United States Mount Olympus Water & Theme Park	The Gravity Group	494
9	Shivering Timbers	United States Michigan's Adventure	CCI	484
10	Prowler	United States Worlds of Fun	GCI	452

== Records broken ==
Record name	Record attribute	Ride	Amusement Park	Date broken	
Amusement park with the largest number of roller coasters	18 roller coasters	Green Lantern: First Flight	United States Six Flags Magic Mountain	July 1	(Note: Six Flags Magic Mountain has since removed Déjà Vu resulting in the record now being a tie between Six Flags Magic Mountain and Cedar Point with 17 roller coasters each.)
Steepest Steel Roller Coaster Drop	113.1° drop	Timber Drop	France Fraispertuis City	July 2	
Steepest Steel Roller Coaster Drop	121° drop	Takabisha	Japan Fuji-Q Highland	July 16	

== See also ==
- List of roller coaster rankings
- Category:Amusement rides introduced in 2011
- Category:Roller coasters opened in 2011
- Category:Amusement rides closed in 2011
