= List of roller coaster rankings =

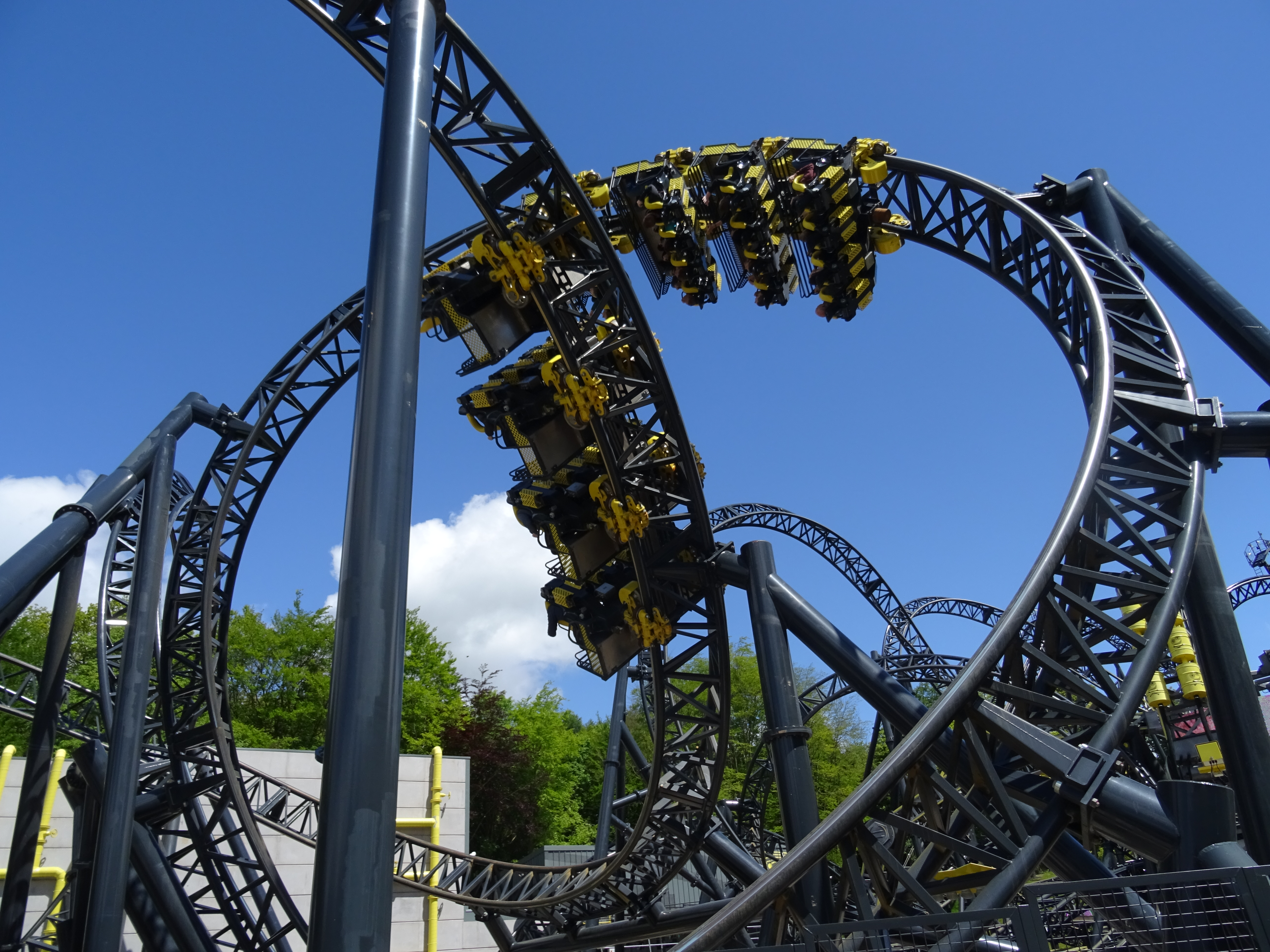
The Smiler is the roller coaster with the most inversions in the world.

Roller coasters are amusement rides developed for amusement parks and modern theme parks. Early iterations during the 16th and 17th centuries, popularized in Russia, involved wooden sleds that carried riders down large slides made from ice. The first roller coasters to attach a train to a wooden track appeared in France in the early 1800s. Although wooden roller coasters are still being produced, steel roller coasters were introduced in the mid-20th-century and eventually became more common. They can be found on every continent except Antarctica.

Amusement parks often compete to build the tallest, fastest, and longest rides to attract thrill seekers and boost park attendance. Ranked by height, speed, length, and number of inversions, roller coasters often became the focal point for competing parks. Computer-simulated models led to innovations that produced more intense thrills while improving quality and durability. The debut of Magnum XL-200 in 1989 at Cedar Point introduced the first complete-circuit roller coaster to exceed 200 feet (61 m) in height, marking a pivot point in the industry and a new era sometimes referred to as the Coaster Wars. This period saw increasing competition as parks sought to be the latest to set a new world record, and some records were held for less than a year.

The pace of competition eventually slowed, however. The now-defunct Kingda Ka, previously the tallest coaster in the world at 456 feet (139 m), held the height record from 2005 until its closure in 2024. Formula Rossa, formerly the world's fastest at 149 mph (240 km/h), held the speed record for 15 years. Steel Dragon 2000, with its track length of 8,133 feet (2,479 m), was the longest in the world for more than 25 years. These records were eventually surpassed by Falcons Flight in 2025, which opened as the tallest, fastest, and longest roller coaster in the world. Other notables include The Beast, the world's longest wooden coaster since its opening in 1979, featuring a track length of 7,361 feet (2,244 m), and The Smiler, which set a world record with fourteen inversions in 2013.

== Key ==
Key
Key	Meaning
1	Record holder
**	Under construction
*	Still exists but not operating

== Height rankings ==
=== Tallest steel roller coasters ===
Tallest steel roller coasters (Note: Record was held by Superman: The Escape (Note: A shuttle roller coaster, not complete-circuit) from March 1997 – May 2003, with a height of 415 feet (126 m).) (Note: Record was held by Kingda Ka from May 2005 – November 2024, featuring a height of 456 feet (139 m) and a drop distance of 418 feet (127 m).)
Rank	Name	Park	Country	Height	Manufacturer	Record held
1	Falcons Flight	Six Flags Qiddiya City	Saudi Arabia	534.8 ft (163.0 m) (Note: Falcons Flight has been advertised with a height of 640 feet (200 m). This is the difference from the highest point to lowest point. Tallest freestanding element is the 534.8 feet (163.0 m) camelback hill.)	Intamin	December 2025 – present
2	Top Thrill 2	Cedar Point	United States	420 ft (130 m)	Intamin/Zamperla	May 2003 – May 2005; November 2024 – December 2025
**	Bakunawa	Six Flags Great Adventure	United States	382 ft (116 m)	Mack Rides	—N/a
3	Red Force	Ferrari Land	Spain	367.3 ft (112.0 m)	Intamin	—N/a
4	Fury 325	Carowinds	United States	325 ft (99 m)	Bolliger & Mabillard	—N/a
5	Steel Dragon 2000	Nagashima Spa Land	Japan	318.3 ft (97.0 m)	D. H. Morgan Manufacturing	—N/a
6	Millennium Force	Cedar Point	United States	310 ft (94 m)	Intamin	—N/a
7	Tormenta Rampaging Run	Six Flags Over Texas	United States	309 ft (94 m)	Bolliger & Mabillard	—N/a
8	Leviathan	Canada's Wonderland	Canada	306 ft (93 m)	Bolliger & Mabillard	—N/a
9	Pantherian	Kings Dominion	United States	305 ft (93 m)	Intamin	—N/a
10	Orion	Kings Island	United States	287 ft (87 m)	Bolliger & Mabillard	—N/a

=== Longest steel roller coaster drops ===
Longest steel roller coaster drops (Note: Record was held by Tower of Terror from January 1997 – May 2003 and Superman: The Escape from March 1997 – May 2003, both of which featured a drop distance of 328.1 feet (100.0 m).)
Rank	Name	Park	Country	Drop length	Manufacturer	Record held
1	Falcons Flight	Six Flags Qiddiya City	Saudi Arabia	518.4 ft (158.0 m)	Intamin	December 2025 – present
2	Top Thrill 2	Cedar Point	United States	400 ft (120 m)	Intamin/Zamperla	May 2003 – May 2005; November 2024 – December 2025
3	Red Force	Ferrari Land	Spain	~345 ft (105 m) (Note: Drop height estimated at 345 ft (105 m) according to TripSavvy.)	Intamin	—N/a
4	Fury 325	Carowinds	United States	320 ft (98 m)	Bolliger & Mabillard	—N/a
5	Steel Dragon 2000	Nagashima Spa Land	Japan	306.8 ft (93.5 m)	D. H. Morgan Manufacturing	—N/a
6	Leviathan	Canada's Wonderland	Canada	306 ft (93 m)	Bolliger & Mabillard	—N/a
7	Millennium Force	Cedar Point	United States	300 ft (91 m)	Intamin	—N/a
7	Orion	Kings Island	United States	300 ft (91 m)	Bolliger & Mabillard	—N/a
7	Pantherian	Kings Dominion	United States	300 ft (91 m)	Intamin	—N/a
10	Tormenta Rampaging Run	Six Flags Over Texas	United States	285 ft (87 m)	Bolliger & Mabillard	—N/a

=== Tallest wooden roller coasters ===
Tallest wooden roller coasters (Note: Record was held by Son of Beast from May 2000 – June 2009. It had a height of 218 feet (66 m), a drop distance of 214 feet (65 m) and a maximum speed of 78 mph (126 km/h).)
Rank	Name	Park	Country	Height	Manufacturer	Record held
1	Monimo RUSH	Everland	South Korea	183.8 ft (56.0 m)	Intamin	June 2009 – present
1	Wildfire	Kolmården Wildlife Park	Sweden	183.8 ft (56.0 m)	Rocky Mountain Construction	June 2016 – present
3	El Toro	Six Flags Great Adventure	United States	181 ft (55 m)	Intamin	—N/a
4	Goliath	Six Flags Great America	United States	165 ft (50 m)	Rocky Mountain Construction	—N/a
5	Colossos - Kampf der Giganten	Heide Park	Germany	164 ft (50 m)	Intamin	—N/a
6	The Voyage	Holiday World & Splashin' Safari	United States	159 ft (48 m)	The Gravity Group	—N/a
7	Jupiter	Kijima Kogen	Japan	137.8 ft (42.0 m)	Intamin	—N/a
8	Hades 360	Mt. Olympus Water & Theme Park	United States	136 ft (41 m)	The Gravity Group	—N/a
9	Wodan Timbur Coaster	Europa-Park	Germany	131.2 ft (40.0 m)	Great Coasters International	—N/a
10	Le Monstre	La Ronde	Canada	130.9 ft (39.9 m)	Martin & Vleminckx	July 1985 – March 1990

=== Longest wooden roller coaster drops ===
Longest wooden roller coaster drops
Rank	Name	Park	Country	Drop length	Manufacturer	Record held
1	Goliath	Six Flags Great America	United States	180 ft (55 m)	Rocky Mountain Construction	June 2014 – present
2	El Toro	Six Flags Great Adventure	United States	176 ft (54 m)	Intamin	June 2009 – June 2014
3	Outlaw Run	Silver Dollar City	United States	162 ft (49 m)	Rocky Mountain Construction	—N/a
4	Wildfire	Kolmården Wildlife Park	Sweden	160.8 ft (49.0 m)	Rocky Mountain Construction	—N/a
5	Colossos - Kampf der Giganten	Heide Park	Germany	159.1 ft (48.5 m)	Intamin	—N/a
6	The Voyage	Holiday World & Splashin' Safari	United States	154 ft (47 m)	The Gravity Group	—N/a
7	Monimo RUSH	Everland	South Korea	150.9 ft (46.0 m)	Intamin	—N/a
8	The Boss	Six Flags St. Louis	United States	150 ft (46 m)	Custom Coasters International	—N/a
9	American Eagle	Six Flags Great America	United States	147 ft (45 m)	Intamin	May 1981 – May 1991
10	The Beast	Kings Island	United States	141 ft (43 m)	Kings Island	April 1979 – May 1981

=== Gallery ===
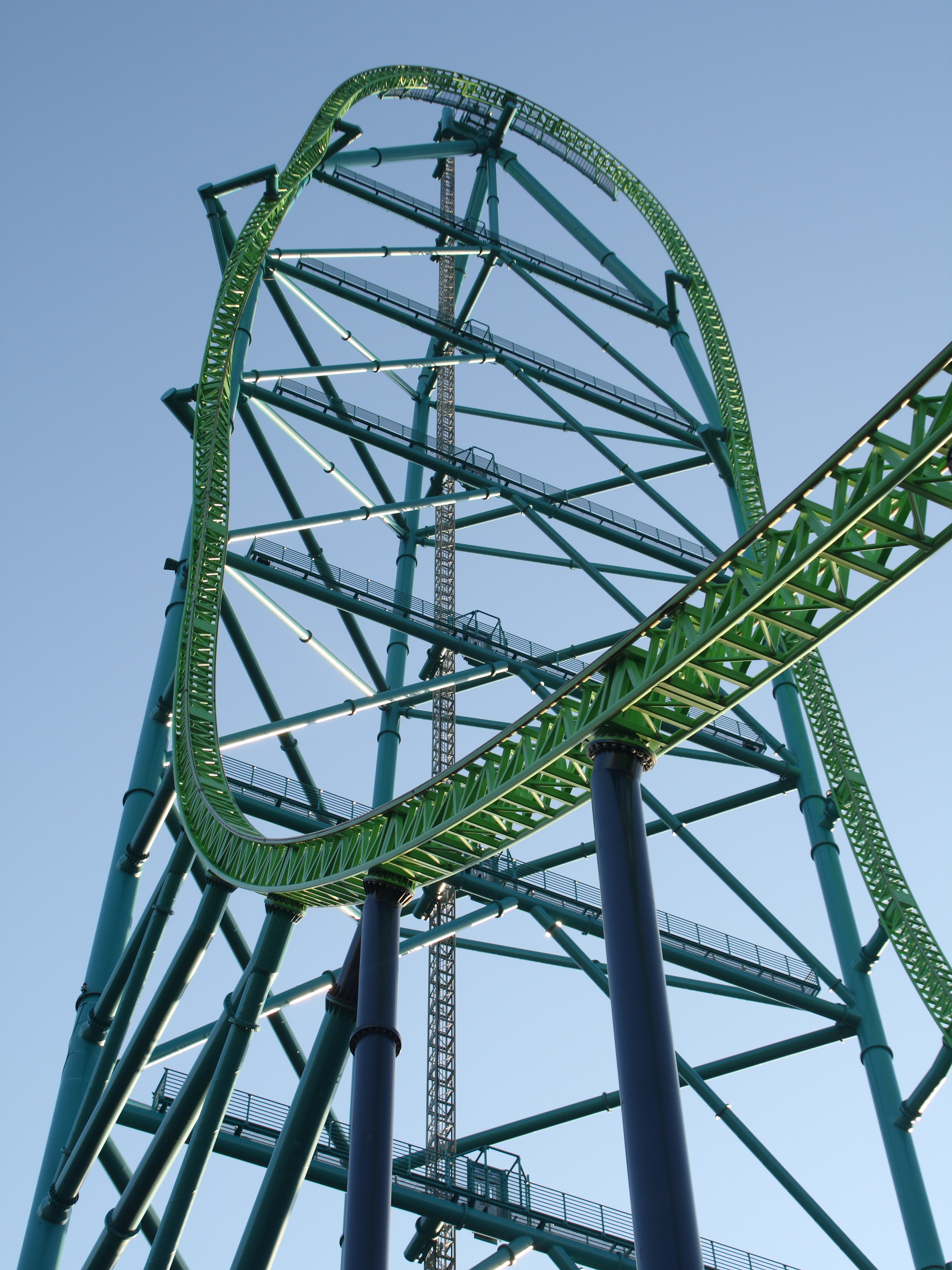
Kingda Ka, the tallest roller coaster in the world from 2005 to 2024.

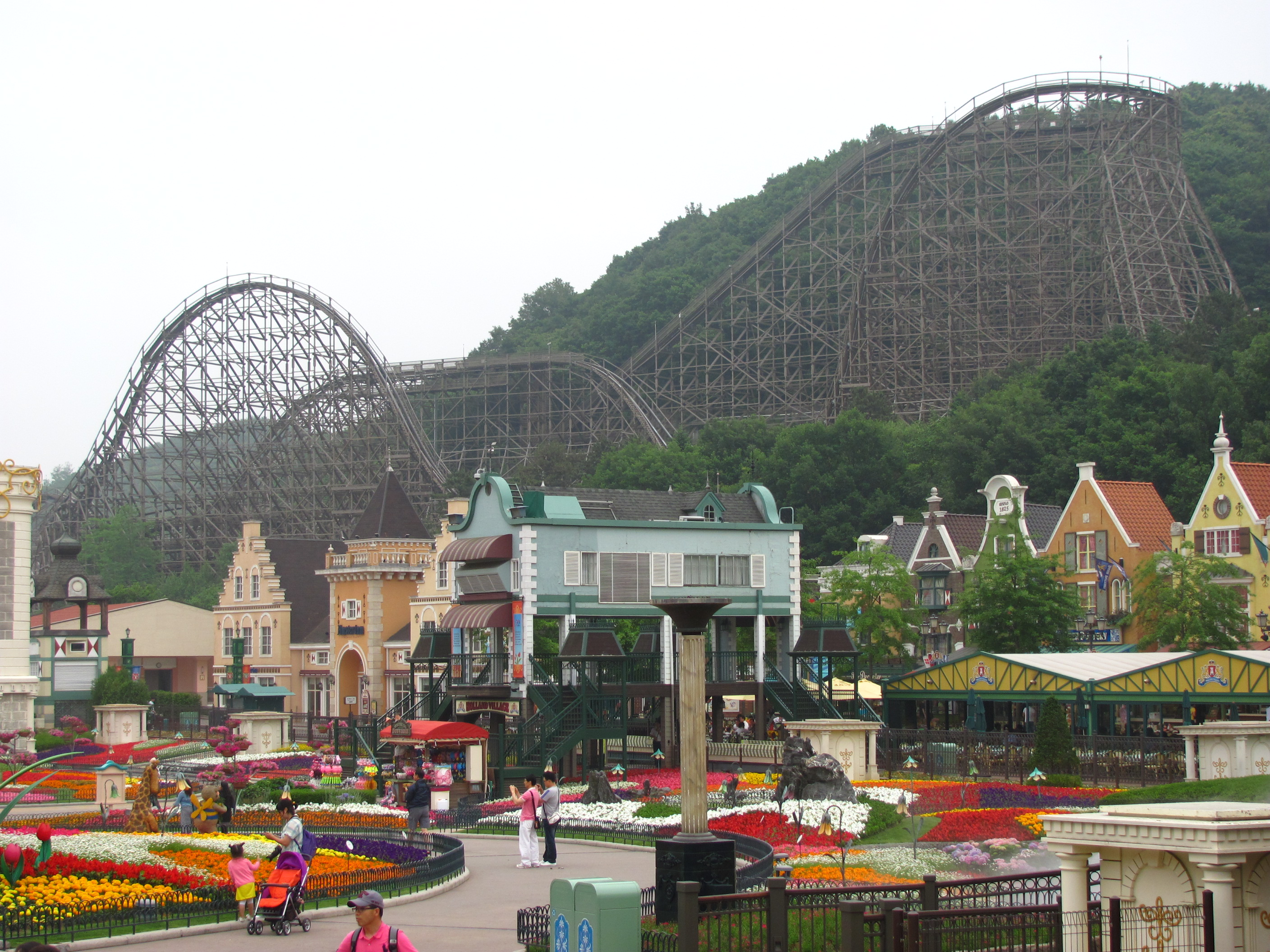
Monimo RUSH at Everland in South Korea, the tallest wooden coaster in the world.

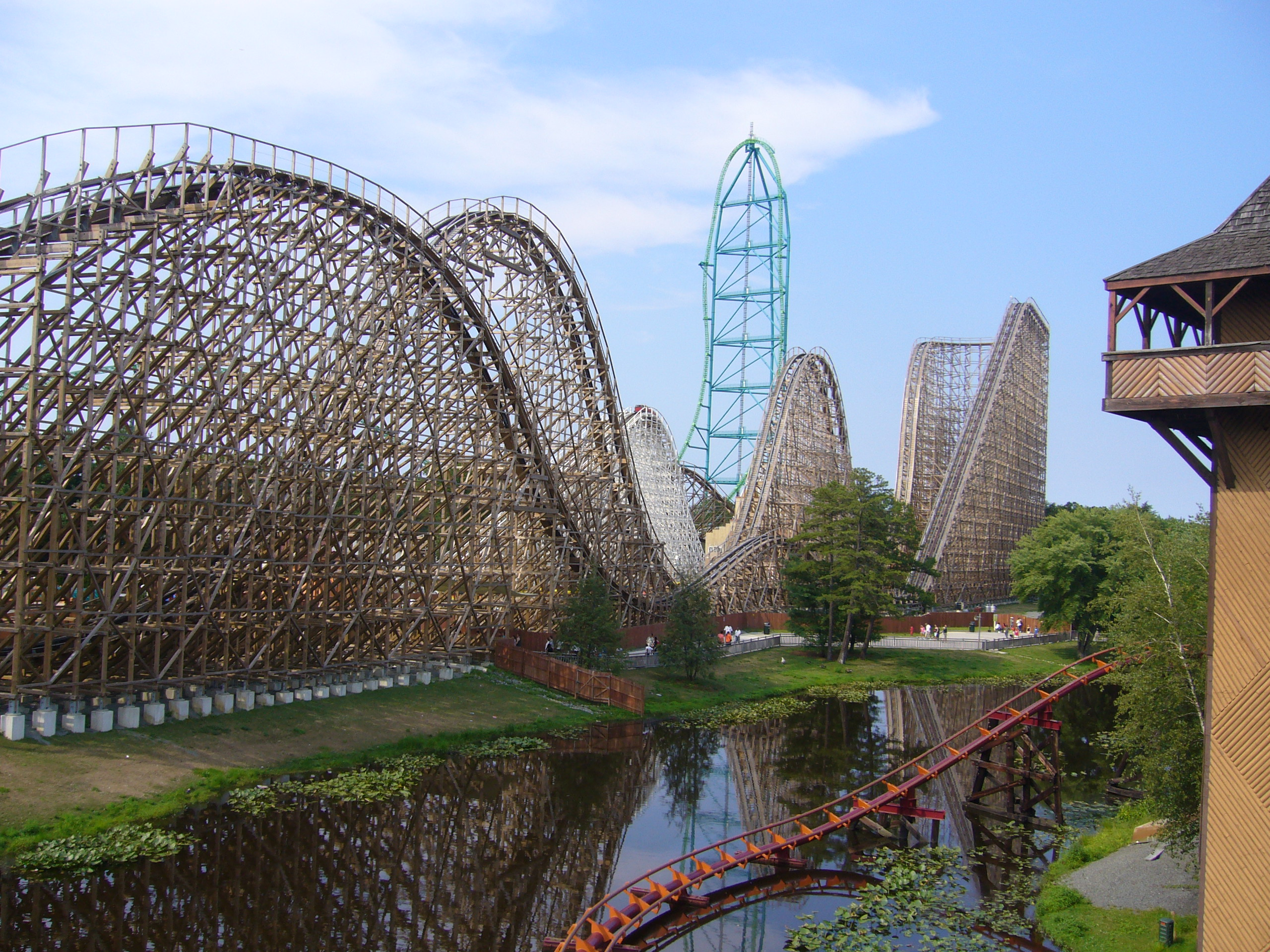
Among the tallest wooden coasters in the world, El Toro at Six Flags Great Adventure in New Jersey features one of the longest drops.

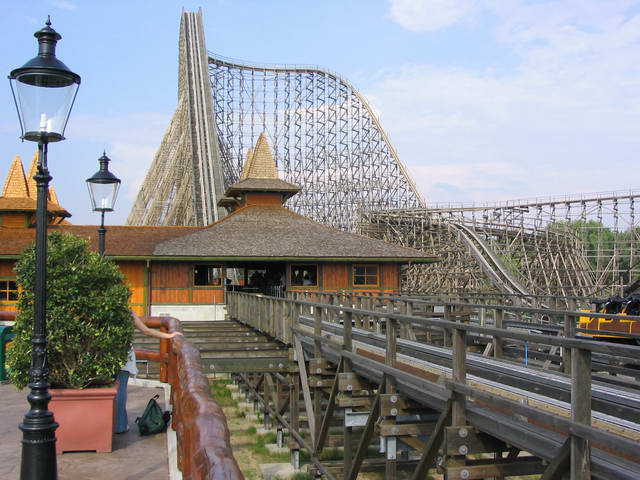
Colossos at Heide Park in Germany, one of the tallest wooden coasters in the world.

== Speed rankings ==
=== Fastest steel roller coasters ===
Fastest steel roller coasters (Note: Record was held by Tower of Terror from January 1997 – December 2001 and Superman: The Escape from March 1997 – December 2001, both of which featured a maximum speed of 100.0 mph (160.9 km/h).) (Note: Record was held by Dodonpa from December 2001 – May 2003, with a maximum speed of 106.9 mph (172.0 km/h).) (Note: Record was held by Kingda Ka from May 2005 – November 2010. It had a maximum speed of 128 mph (206 km/h).)
Rank	Name	Park	Country	Speed	Manufacturer	Record held
1	Falcons Flight	Six Flags Qiddiya City	Saudi Arabia	155.3 mph (249.9 km/h)	Intamin	December 2025 – present
2	Formula Rossa	Ferrari World Abu Dhabi	United Arab Emirates	149.1 mph (240.0 km/h)	Intamin	November 2010 – December 2025
3	Top Thrill 2	Cedar Point	United States	120 mph (190 km/h)	Intamin/Zamperla	May 2003 – May 2005
4	Red Force	Ferrari Land	Spain	111.8 mph (179.9 km/h)	Intamin	—N/a
**	Bakunawa	Six Flags Great Adventure	United States	100 mph (160 km/h)	Mack Rides	—N/a
5	Steel Dragon 2000	Nagashima Spa Land	Japan	95 mph (153 km/h)	D. H. Morgan Manufacturing	—N/a
5	Fury 325	Carowinds	United States	95 mph (153 km/h)	Bolliger & Mabillard	—N/a
7	Millennium Force	Cedar Point	United States	93 mph (150 km/h)	Intamin	—N/a
8	Leviathan	Canada's Wonderland	Canada	92 mph (148 km/h)	Bolliger & Mabillard	—N/a
9	Orion	Kings Island	United States	91 mph (146 km/h)	Bolliger & Mabillard	—N/a
10	Pantherian	Kings Dominion	United States	90 mph (140 km/h)	Intamin	—N/a

=== Fastest wooden roller coasters ===
Fastest wooden roller coasters (Note: Record was held by Lightning Rod from June 2016 – September 2020, before its conversion into a steel roller coaster. It had a drop distance of 165 feet (50 m) and a maximum speed of 73 mph (117 km/h).)
Rank	Name	Park	Country	Speed	Manufacturer	Record held
1	Goliath	Six Flags Great America	United States	72 mph (116 km/h)	Rocky Mountain Construction	June 2014 – June 2016; September 2020 – present
2	Wildfire	Kolmården Wildlife Park	Sweden	71.5 mph (115.1 km/h)	Rocky Mountain Construction	—N/a
3	El Toro	Six Flags Great Adventure	United States	70.0 mph (112.7 km/h)	Intamin	June 2009 – June 2014
4	Colossos - Kampf der Giganten	Heide Park	Germany	68.4 mph (110.1 km/h)	Intamin	—N/a
5	Outlaw Run	Silver Dollar City	United States	68 mph (109 km/h)	Rocky Mountain Construction	—N/a
6	The Voyage	Holiday World & Splashin' Safari	United States	67 mph (108 km/h)	The Gravity Group	—N/a
7	The Boss	Six Flags St. Louis	United States	66.3 mph (106.7 km/h)	Custom Coasters International	April 2000 – May 2000
8	American Eagle	Six Flags Great America	United States	66 mph (106 km/h)	Intamin	May 1981 – April 2000
9	The Beast	Kings Island	United States	64.8 mph (104.3 km/h)	Kings Island	April 1979 – May 1981
10	Monimo RUSH	Everland	South Korea	64.6 mph (104.0 km/h)	Intamin	—N/a

=== Gallery ===
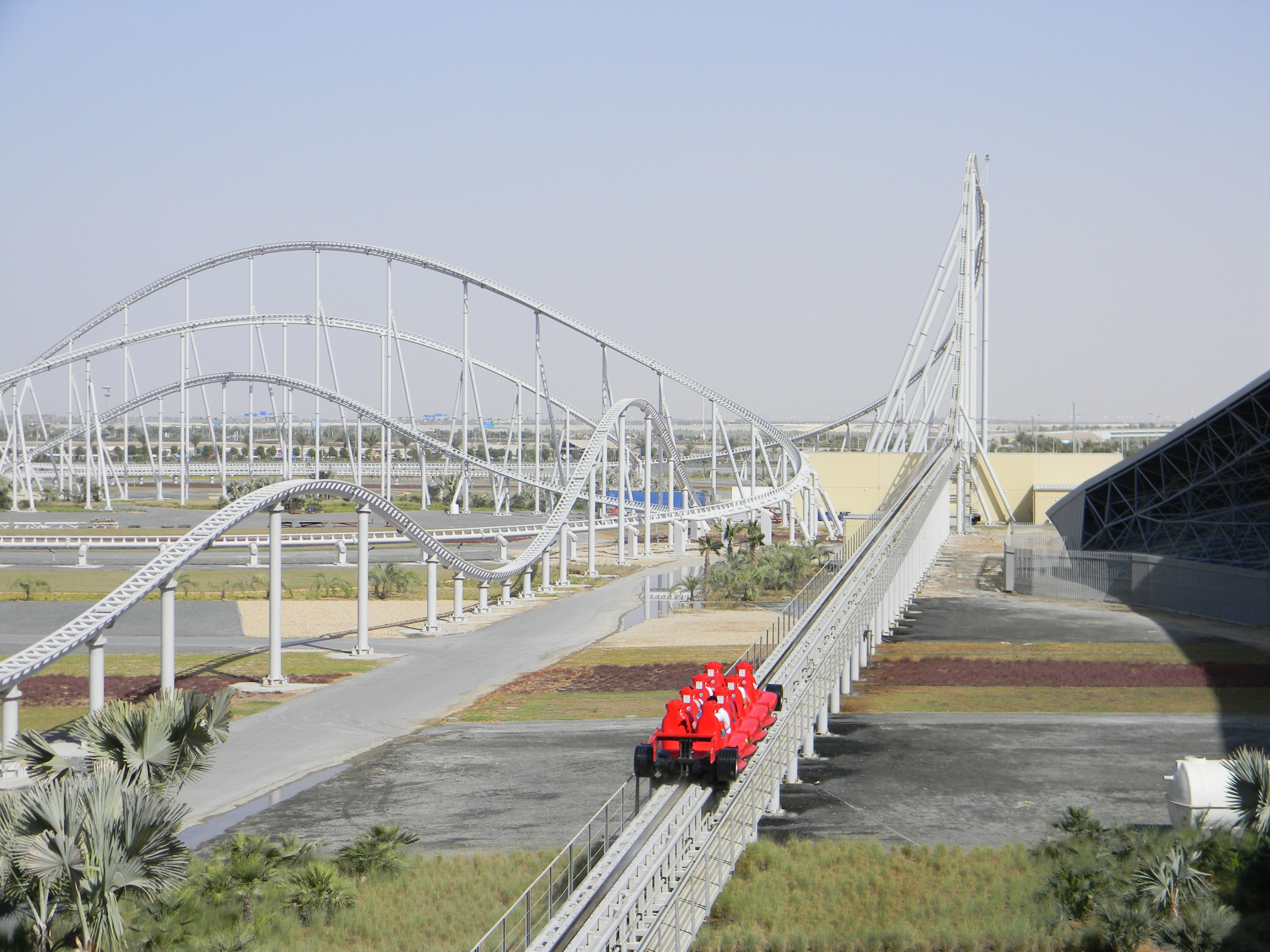
Formula Rossa in United Arab Emirates, the fastest roller coaster in the world from November 2010 to December 2025.

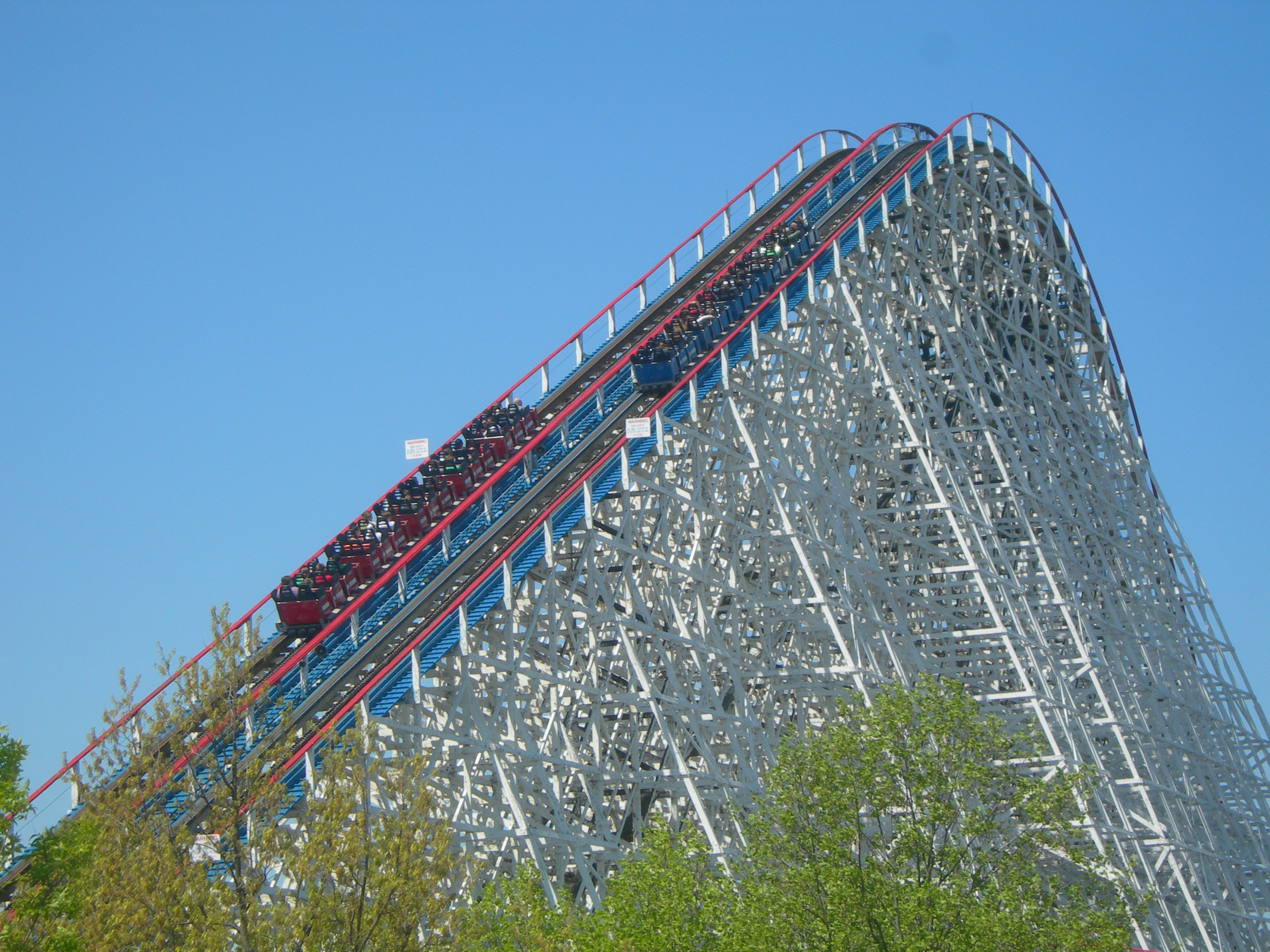
American Eagle opened in 1981 as the fastest roller coaster in the world.

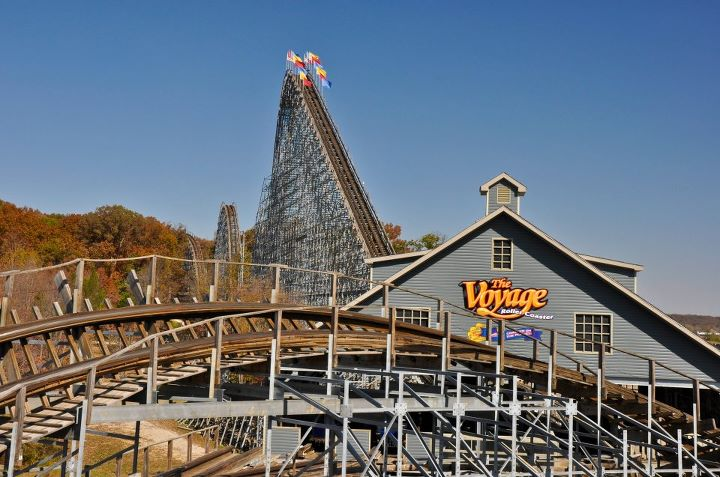
The Voyage, one of the fastest wooden coasters in the world.

== Length rankings ==
=== Longest steel roller coasters ===
Longest steel roller coasters (Note: Record was held by The Ultimate from July 1991 – August 2000, with a length of 7,442 feet (2,268 m).)
Rank	Name	Park	Country	Length	Manufacturer	Record held
1	Falcons Flight	Six Flags Qiddiya City	Saudi Arabia	13,944 ft (4,250 m)	Intamin	December 2025 – present
2	Steel Dragon 2000	Nagashima Spa Land	Japan	8,133 ft (2,479 m)	D. H. Morgan Manufacturing	August 2000 – December 2025
3	Formula Rossa	Ferrari World Abu Dhabi	United Arab Emirates	6,805 ft (2,074 m)	Intamin	—N/a
4	Fujiyama	Fuji-Q Highland	Japan	6,709 ft (2,045 m)	TOGO	—N/a
5	Fury 325	Carowinds	United States	6,602 ft (2,012 m)	Bolliger & Mabillard	—N/a
6	Millennium Force	Cedar Point	United States	6,595 ft (2,010 m)	Intamin	—N/a
7	Incredicoaster	Disney California Adventure	United States	6,072 ft (1,851 m)	Intamin	—N/a
*	Desperado	Buffalo Bill's	United States	5,843 ft (1,781 m)	Arrow Dynamics	—N/a
8	Steel Vengeance	Cedar Point	United States	5,740 ft (1,750 m)	Rocky Mountain Construction	—N/a
9	Mamba	Worlds of Fun	United States	5,600 ft (1,707 m)	D. H. Morgan Manufacturing	—N/a
9	Steel Force	Dorney Park & Wildwater Kingdom	United States	5,600 ft (1,707 m)	D. H. Morgan Manufacturing	—N/a

=== Longest wooden roller coasters ===
Longest wooden roller coasters
Rank	Name	Park	Country	Length	Manufacturer	Record held
1	The Beast	Kings Island	United States	7,361 ft (2,244 m)	Kings Island	April 1979 – present
2	The Voyage	Holiday World & Splashin' Safari	United States	6,442 ft (1,964 m)	The Gravity Group	—N/a
3	Monimo RUSH	Everland	South Korea	5,383.8 ft (1,641.0 m)	Intamin	—N/a
4	Shivering Timbers	Michigan's Adventure	United States	5,383 ft (1,641 m)	Custom Coasters International	—N/a
5	Jupiter	Kijima Amusement Park	Japan	5,249 ft (1,600 m)	Intamin	—N/a
6	Python in Bamboo Forest	Nanchang Sunac Land	China	5,111 ft (1,558 m)	Great Coasters International	—N/a
7	Wood Coaster	Knight Valley	China	4,817 ft (1,468 m)	Great Coasters International	—N/a
8	Hades 360	Mt. Olympus Water & Theme Park	United States	4,746 ft (1,447 m)	The Gravity Group	—N/a
9	Boulder Dash	Lake Compounce	United States	4,725 ft (1,440 m)	Custom Coasters International	—N/a
10	American Eagle	Six Flags Great America	United States	4,650 ft (1,420 m)	Intamin	—N/a

=== Gallery ===
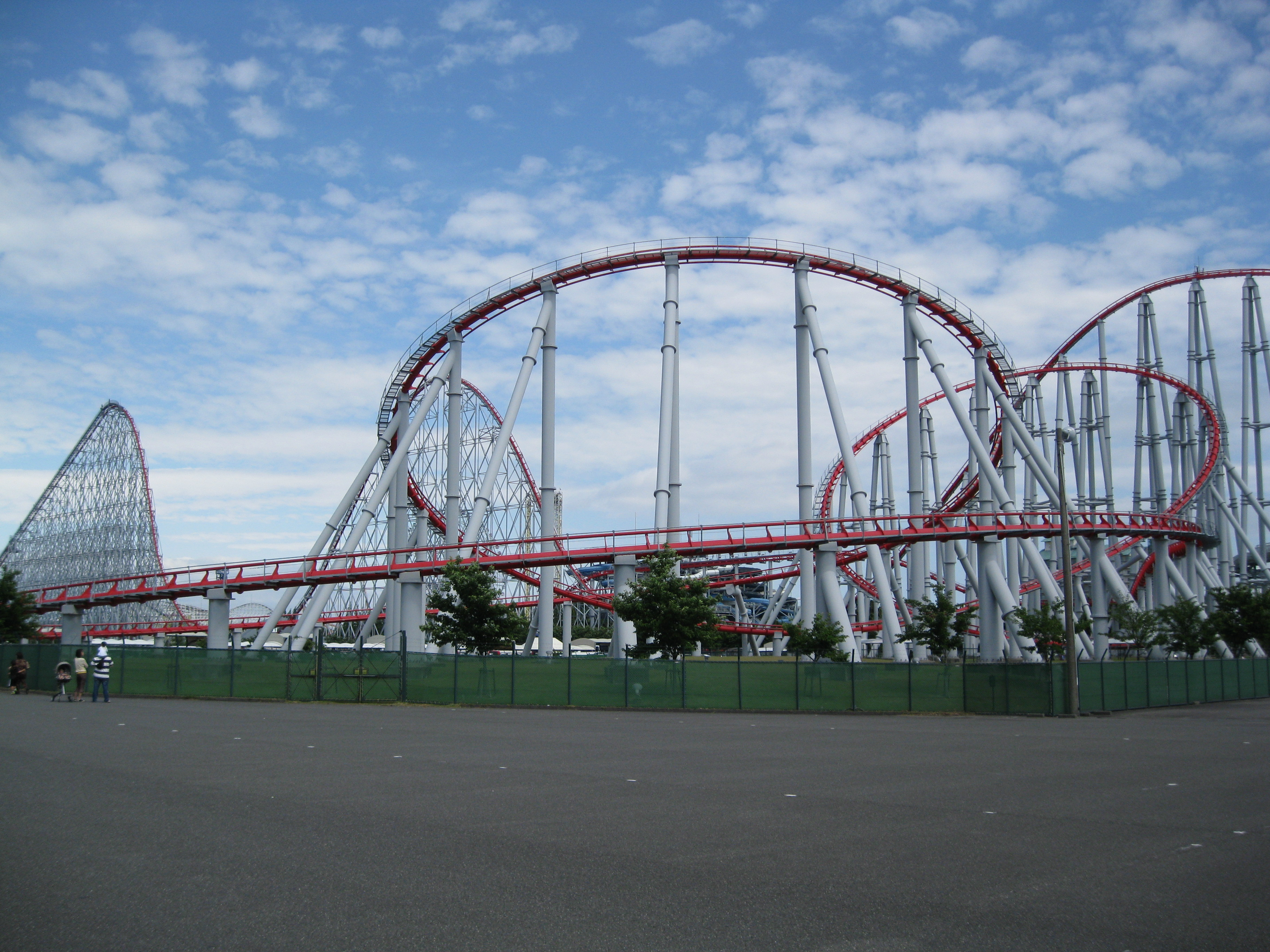
Steel Dragon 2000, the longest roller coaster in the world from August 2000 to December 2025.

== Inversion rankings ==
This listing contains all types of roller coaster inversions.

=== Steel roller coasters ===
Most inversions on a steel roller coaster (Note: Record was co-held by 10 Inversion Roller Coaster from February 2006 – May 2013, featuring 10 inversions)
Rank	Name	Park	Country	Inversions	Manufacturer	Record held
1	The Smiler	Alton Towers	United Kingdom	14	Gerstlauer	May 2013 – present
*	Eleventh Roller Coaster	Great Xingdong Tourist World	China	11	Hebei Zhongye	—N/a
2	Altair	Cinecittà World	Italy	10	Intamin	—N/a
2	Colossus	Thorpe Park	United Kingdom	10	Intamin	March 2002 – May 2013
2	Crazy Coaster	Locajoy Holiday	China	10	Intamin	—N/a
2	Velikolukskiy Myasokombinat-2	Wonder Island	Russia	10	Intamin	—N/a
2	Sik	Flamingo Land	United Kingdom	10	Intamin	—N/a
*	LightSpeed	Wonderland Eurasia	Turkey	10	Intamin	—N/a
7	AlpenFury	Canada's Wonderland	Canada	9	Premier Rides	—N/a
8	Avalancha	Xetulul	Guatemala	8	Intamin	—N/a
8	Dragon Khan	PortAventura Park	Spain	8	Bolliger & Mabillard	May 1995 – March 2002
8	Steel Curtain (Note: The Roller Coaster DataBase lists the ride as having eight inversions, since the banana roll is counted as one inversion. Other sources list the ride as having nine inversions, with the banana roll counted as two.)	Kennywood	United States	8	S&S - Sansei Technologies	—N/a

=== Wooden roller coasters ===
Most inversions on a wooden roller coaster (Note: Record was held by Son of Beast from May 2000 – July 2006, which featured 1 inversion. The vertical loop was removed following an incident in July 2006.)
Rank	Name	Park	Country	Inversions	Manufacturer	Record held
1	Outlaw Run	Silver Dollar City	United States	3	Rocky Mountain Construction	March 2013 – present
1	Wildfire	Kolmården Wildlife Park	Sweden	3	Rocky Mountain Construction	June 2016 – present
2	Goliath	Six Flags Great America	United States	2	Rocky Mountain Construction	—N/a
3	Hades 360	Mt. Olympus Water & Theme Park	United States	1	The Gravity Group	—N/a
3	Jungle Trailblazer	Oriental Heritage, Ningbo	China	1	Martin & Vleminckx Rides	—N/a
3	Jungle Trailblazer	Oriental Heritage, Wuhu	China	1	Martin & Vleminckx Rides	—N/a
3	Jungle Trailblazer	Oriental Heritage, Jinan	China	1	Martin & Vleminckx Rides	—N/a
3	Mine Blower	Fun Spot America: Kissimmee	United States	1	The Gravity Group	—N/a

=== Gallery ===
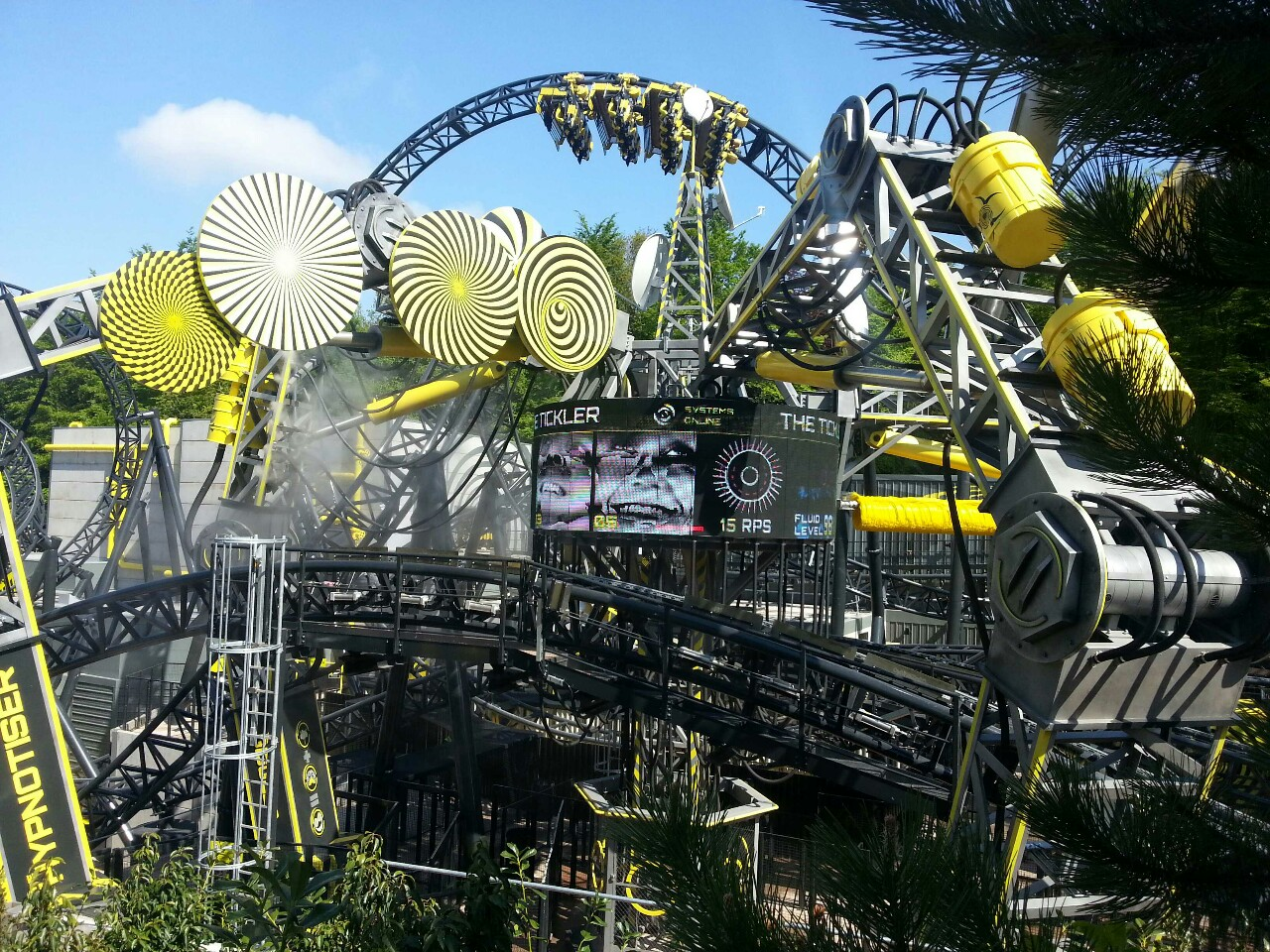
The Smiler, the roller coaster with the most inversions in the world.

== Drop angle rankings ==
=== Steel roller coasters ===
Steepest drop angle on a steel roller coaster
Rank	Name	Park	Country	Drop angle	Manufacturer	Record held
1	TMNT Shellraiser	Nickelodeon Universe	United States	121.5°	Gerstlauer	October 2019 – present
2	Takabisha	Fuji-Q Highland	Japan	121.0°	Gerstlauer	15 July 2011 – October 2019
3	Green Lantern Coaster	Warner Bros. Movie World	Australia	120.5°	S&S Worldwide	—N/a
4	Crazy Bird	Happy Valley Tianjin	China	120.0°	S&S Worldwide	—N/a
5	Cannibal	Lagoon	United States	116.0°	Lagoon Corporation	—N/a
6	Timber Drop	Fraispertuis City	France	113.0°	S&S Worldwide	2 July 2011 – 14 July 2011
7	Mumbo Jumbo	Flamingo Land Resort	United Kingdom	112.0°	S&S Worldwide	July 2009 – 1 July 2011
8	Steel Hawg	Indiana Beach	United States	111.0°	S&S Worldwide	July 2008 – July 2009
9	Defiance	Glenwood Caverns Adventure Park	United States	102.3°	Gerstlauer	—N/a
10	Monster	Adventureland	United States	101.0°	Gerstlauer	—N/a
10	Toutatis	Parc Astérix	France	101.0°	Intamin	—N/a

=== Wooden roller coasters ===
Steepest drop angle on a wooden roller coaster (Note: Record was held by Switchback from October 2015 – August 2025, featuring a drop angle of 87.0°.)
Rank	Name	Park	Country	Drop angle	Manufacturer	Record held
1	Goliath	Six Flags Great America	United States	85.0°	Rocky Mountain Construction	June 2014 – October 2015, August 2025 – present
2	Wildfire	Kolmården Wildlife Park	Sweden	83.0°	Rocky Mountain Construction	—N/a
3	Outlaw Run	Silver Dollar City	United States	81.0°	Rocky Mountain Construction	March 2013 – June 2014
4	Monimo RUSH	Everland	South Korea	77.0°	Intamin	March 2008 – March 2013
5	El Toro	Six Flags Great Adventure	United States	76.0°	Intamin	June 2006 – March 2008
6	Balder	Liseberg	Sweden	70.0°	Intamin	April 2003 – June 2006
7	Voyage	Holiday World & Splashin' Safari	United States	66.0°	The Gravity Group	—N/a
8	Hades 360	Mt. Olympus Water & Theme Park	United States	65.0°	The Gravity Group	—N/a
8	Cú Chulainn	Emerald Park	Ireland	65.0°	The Gravity Group	—N/a
10	Hala Madrid	Real Madrid World	United Arab Emirates	63.9°	Great Coasters International	—N/a
