= El Loco (roller coaster) =

Type of roller coaster manufactured by S&S Worldwide

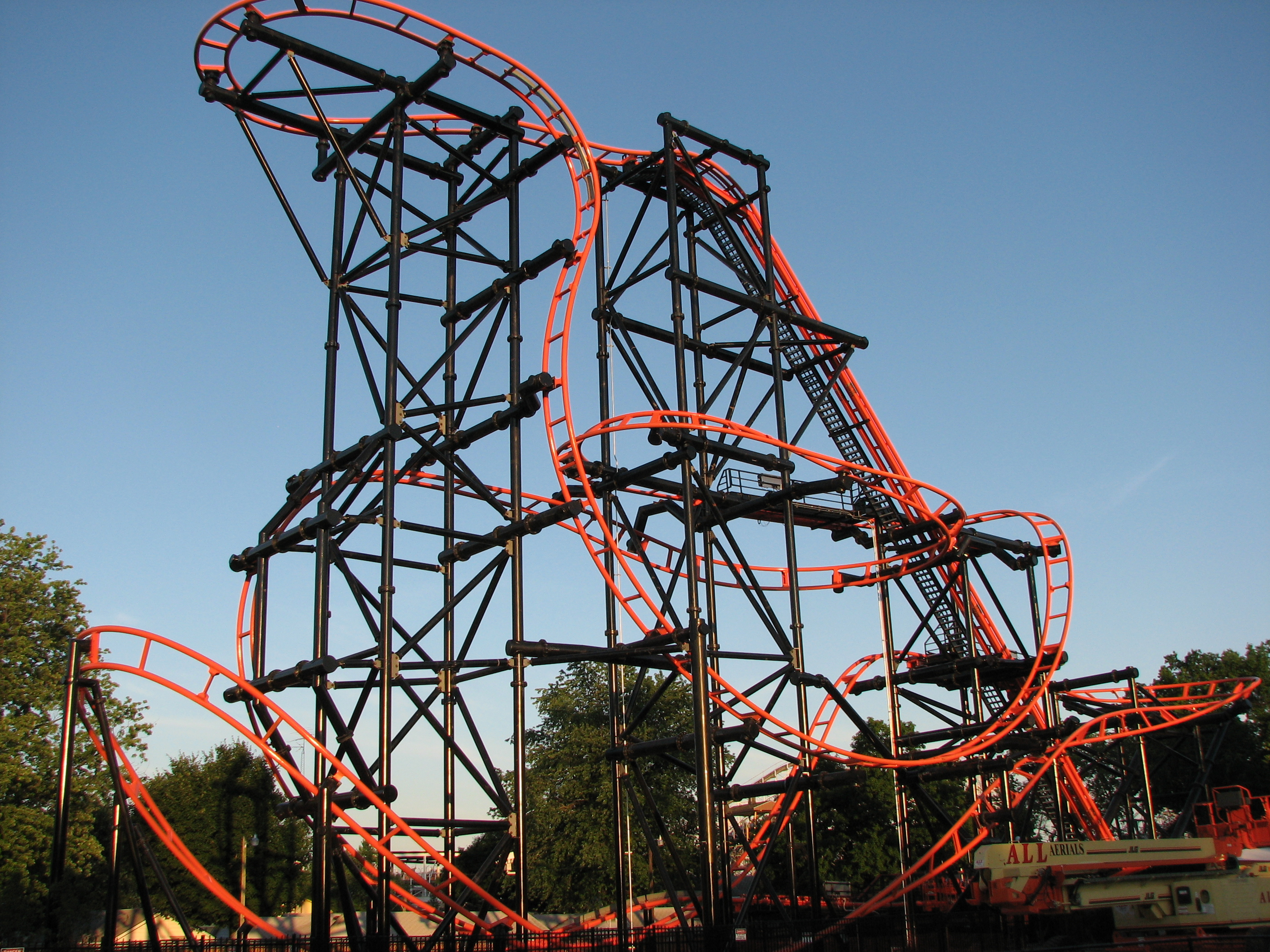
- An overview of Steel Hawg at Indiana Beach
- Status: In production
- First manufactured: 2008
- No. of installations: 6
- Manufacturer: S&S Worldwide
- El Loco at RCDB

El Loco is a model of steel roller coaster manufactured by S&S Worldwide. The rides are characterized by a vertical or beyond-vertical drop, tight corners and abnormal banking. As of November 2013, there are six El Locos operating around the world.

== History ==
The first El Loco was Steel Hawg at Indiana Beach. The ride was announced in November 2007 as having a 120° first drop and a planned opening date in mid-May 2008. However, these were revised to a drop angle of 111° and an opening date on July 5, 2008. The ride drop angle was the steepest in the world at the time, taking the record from a series of Gerstlauer Euro-Fighters which shared the record with drops of 97°. The design of the outward banking turn found on the ride was developed by Alan Schilke of Ride Centerline LLC.

Mumbo Jumbo at Flamingo Land was the next El Loco to be constructed. In order for the ride to take the world's steepest drop record from Steel Hawg, the drop angle was increased to 112°. All other elements of the ride remained the same. The ride opened on July 4, 2009.

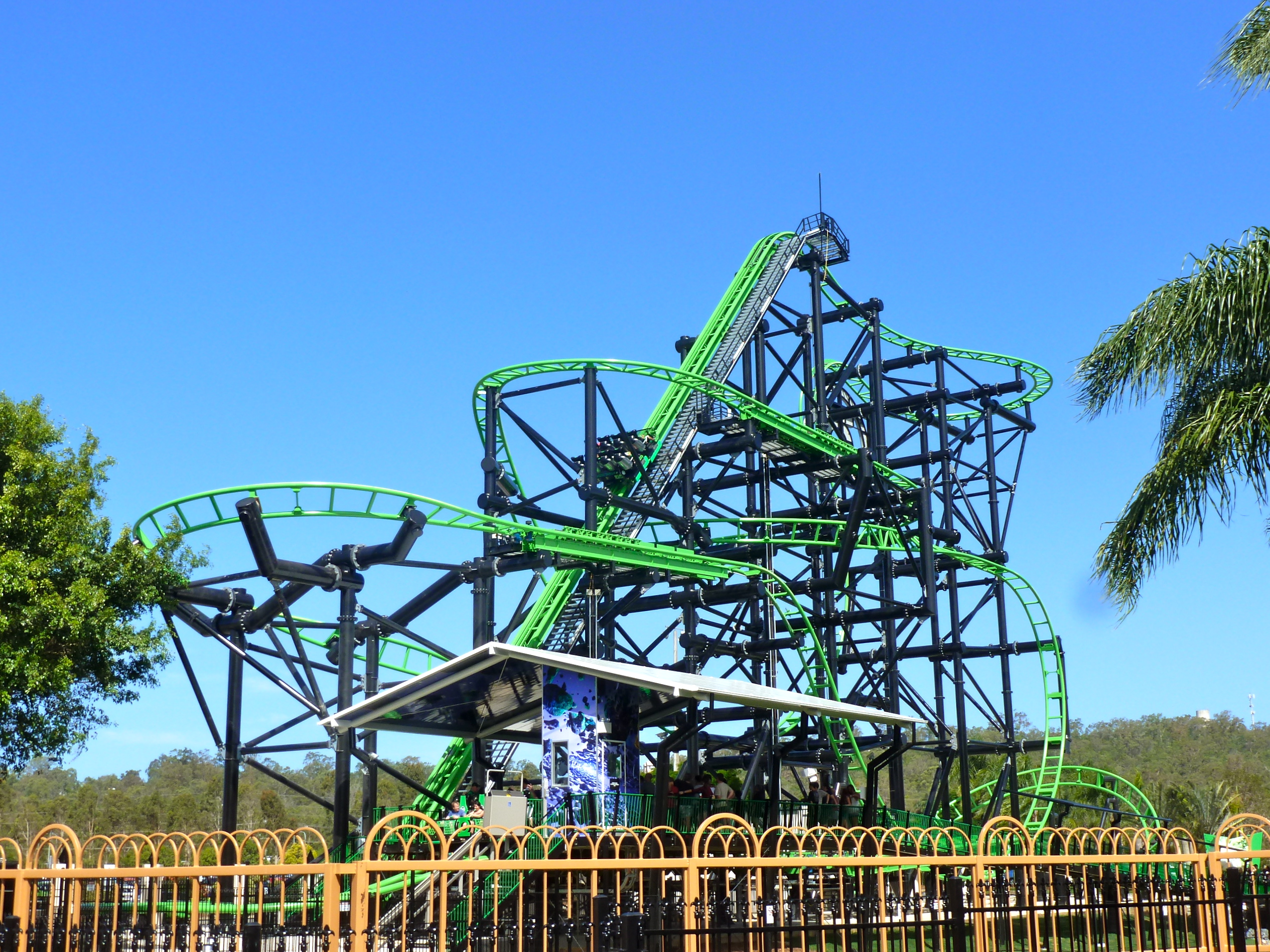
The biggest El Loco is Green Lantern Coaster at Warner Bros. Movie World.

In 2011, S&S Worldwide set about building two El Loco roller coasters. The first was Timber Drop at Fraispertuis City which opened on July 2, 2011. Following the trend from the previous versions, this ride had an increased drop angle of 1° (making the drop 113°) to claim the world record. This record was short-lived with Takabisha at Fuji-Q Highland claiming the record just two weeks later. Also in 2011, Warner Bros. Movie World collaborated directly with S&S Worldwide to develop an El Loco roller coaster that was unlike the previous models of Mumbo Jumbo, Steel Hawg and Timber Drop. The park wanted the same style of ride, but with increased capacity. S&S Worldwide came up with a new train design which features four across seating in two rows, totalling eight riders per train. This gives the ride double the capacity of the previous El Locos. The trains are articulated in such a way that the first row of four riders moves independently from the second row. Each seat features a pair of stereo speakers in the head rest which are capable of playing multiple tracks for up to 9 minutes on a single charge. Riders are harnessed in to the ride through the use of lap bars and seat belts. This design was showcased by the company at the 2011 IAAPA Attractions Expo. The ride also features a drop angle of 120.5° – the third steepest in the world. Green Lantern Coaster officially opened on December 23, 2011.

In 2013, a new El Loco was opened at Happy Valley, Tianjin named Crazy Bird, featuring a 120° drop.

Circus Circus Las Vegas opened the first indoor El Loco on a custom track layout to fit an existing space in February 2014. It is the second indoor installation at the Adventuredome.

In March 2014, Sansei Technologies, S&S's parent company, constructed Twist Coaster Robin at Yomiuriland, a roller coaster based on S&S's El Loco model. The ride featured a layout that differed from the previous models, although the elements were similar. The coaster closed the same day it opened following an incident, and it remained closed until it was demolished in March 2016.

== Locations ==
As of February 2014, there are six El Locos operating around the world.

Name	Park	Location	Opening date	Status	Drop angle	Ref.
Crazy Bird	Happy Valley, Tianjin	Dongli, Tianjin, China	December 22, 2013	Operating	120°	
El Loco	Adventuredome	Las Vegas, Nevada, United States	February 18, 2014	Operating	90°	
Green Lantern Coaster	Warner Bros. Movie World	Gold Coast, Queensland, Australia	December 23, 2011	Operating	120.5°	
Mumbo Jumbo	Flamingo Land	North Yorkshire, England, United Kingdom	July 4, 2009	Operating	112°	
Steel Hawg	Indiana Beach	Monticello, Indiana, United States	July 5, 2008	Operating	111°	
Timber Drop	Fraispertuis City	Jeanménil, Vosges, France	July 2, 2011	Operating	113°	

== Ride experience ==
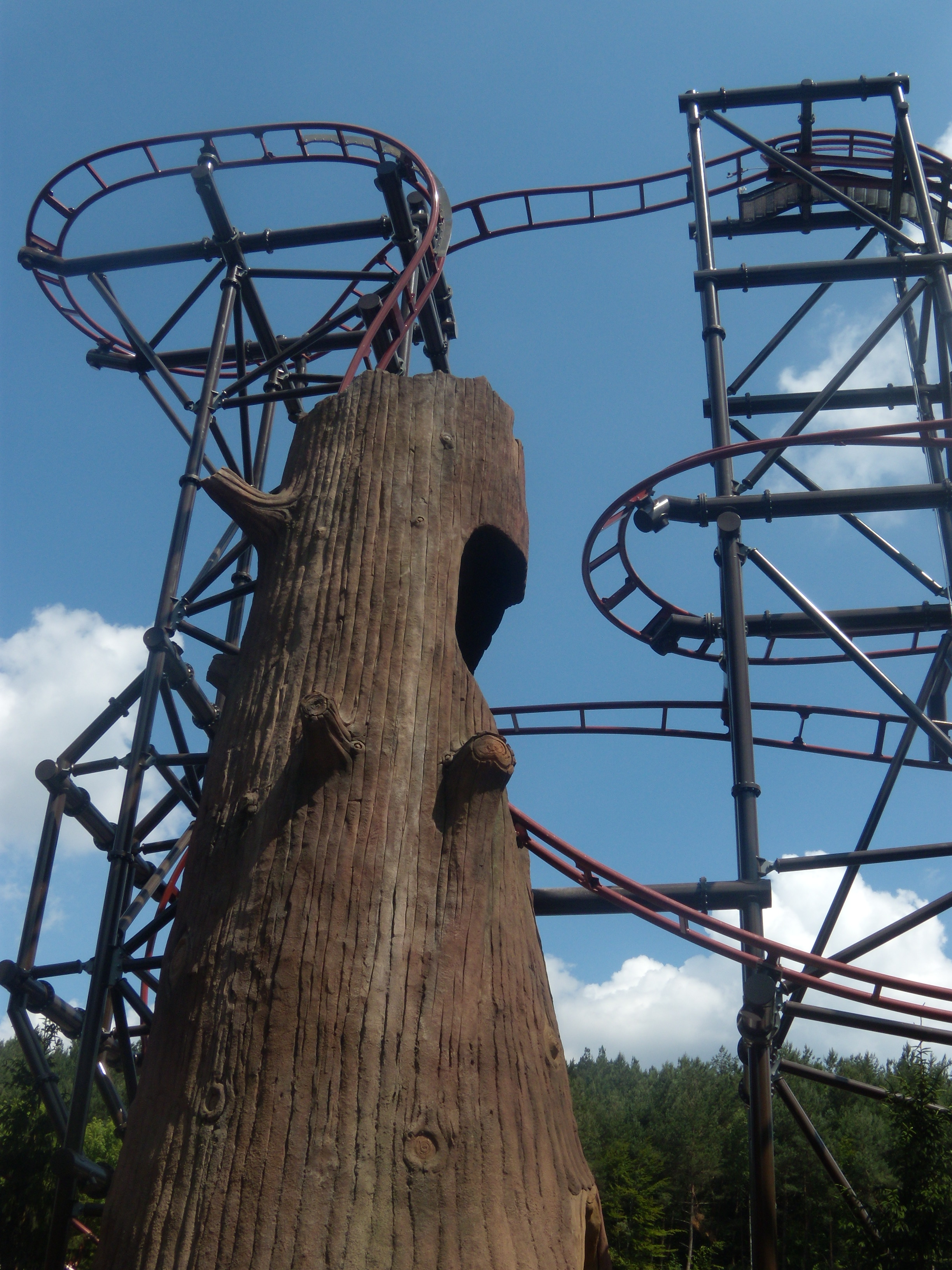
The first drop on Timber Drop at Fraispertuis City

The majority of El Loco roller coasters begin with a U-turn out of the station. Riders ascend a chain lift hill before going down a small dip and into an s-bend followed by a U-turn. After a slight ascent, the car enters a beyond-vertical drop. The track then returns to approximately two thirds of its original height before entering the first set of block brakes. These brakes lead into a left turn with reverse or outward banking. It then drops under the block brakes and into the first inversion – a Dive Loop. The inversion begins with half of an inline twist which transitions into half of a vertical loop. Upon exiting the inversion the track makes an incline and into a second set of block brakes. The train then goes around a right U-turn and into the second inversion – a downwards inline twist. This leads into a cutback-style turnaround before entering the final brake run and returning to the station.

== Records ==
As of July 2022, the operating El Loco roller coasters are two of the five steepest roller coasters in the world. Three of these rides held the Guinness World Record for a period of time.

Steepest steel roller coasters
Rank	Name	Location	Drop angle	Record held	Ref.
3	Green Lantern Coaster	Warner Bros. Movie World	120.5°	—N/a	
4	Crazy Bird	Happy Valley	120°	—N/a	
6	Timber Drop	Fraispertuis City	113°	July 2, 2011 – July 15, 2011	
7	Mumbo Jumbo	Flamingo Land	112°	July 4, 2009 – July 1, 2011	
8	Steel Hawg	Indiana Beach	111°	July 5, 2008 – July 3, 2009	

== See also ==
- Polercoaster
- Gerstlauer Euro-Fighter
