= Twist Coaster Robin =

Roller coaster in Tokyo

- A diagram of the ride

Yomiuriland
- Location: Yomiuriland
- Coordinates: 35.625317°N 139.519394°E
- Status: Removed
- Opening date: 19 March 2014
- Closing date: 19 March 2014
- Cost: ¥450 million
- Replaced by: Hashibiro GO!

General statistics
- Type: Steel
- Manufacturer: Sansei Technologies
- Designer: S&S Worldwide
- Model: El Loco
- Height: 62.3 ft (19.0 m)
- Length: 1,026.9 ft (313.0 m)
- Speed: 38.5 mph (62.0 km/h)
- Inversions: 2
- Max vertical angle: 93°
- G-force: 3.9
- Trains: a single car. Riders are arranged 2 across in 2 rows for a total of 4 riders per train.
- Twist Coaster Robin at RCDB

Twist Coaster Robin (Japanese: ツイストコースター ロビン) was a steel roller coaster at Yomiuriland amusement park in Inagi, Tokyo, Japan. The coaster was noteworthy for its steeper-than-vertical first drop of 93 degrees. It is also one of two S&S coasters to have run for less than a week, the other being Ring Racer.

== Description ==
Twist Coaster Robin was a custom installation of the El Loco roller coaster model. The coaster was built by a collaboration between Sansei Technologies and S&S Worldwide (the usual manufacturer of El Loco coasters, and of whom Sansei Technologies is a majority owner). The coaster featured two inversions: an inline twist and a dive loop. In addition, the coaster had a helix and an unusual element known as a "reverse-cant curve", intended to give riders the feeling that they will be thrown off of the coaster. Park guests could see the Shinjuku skyline when riding Twist Coaster Robin. The coaster had single-car trains, each of which had four riders in two rows of two.

== History and incidents ==
The construction of Twist Coaster Robin cost a total of 450 million yen, which a Yomiuriland spokesperson called "the largest investment on a single attraction (in the park) since 1997". The grand opening for Twist Coaster Robin occurred on 19 March 2014—the 50th anniversary of Yomiuriland's opening.

On the same day that Twist Coaster Robin opened, a coaster car detached from the lift chain, rolled back, and collided with another car. Although no riders were hurt, the park suspended operation of the coaster. Roller Coaster DataBase notes that the coaster only operated in March 2014. It was removed from the park in 2016.
