= Mumbo Jumbo (roller coaster) =

Amusement ride at Flamingo Land Resort

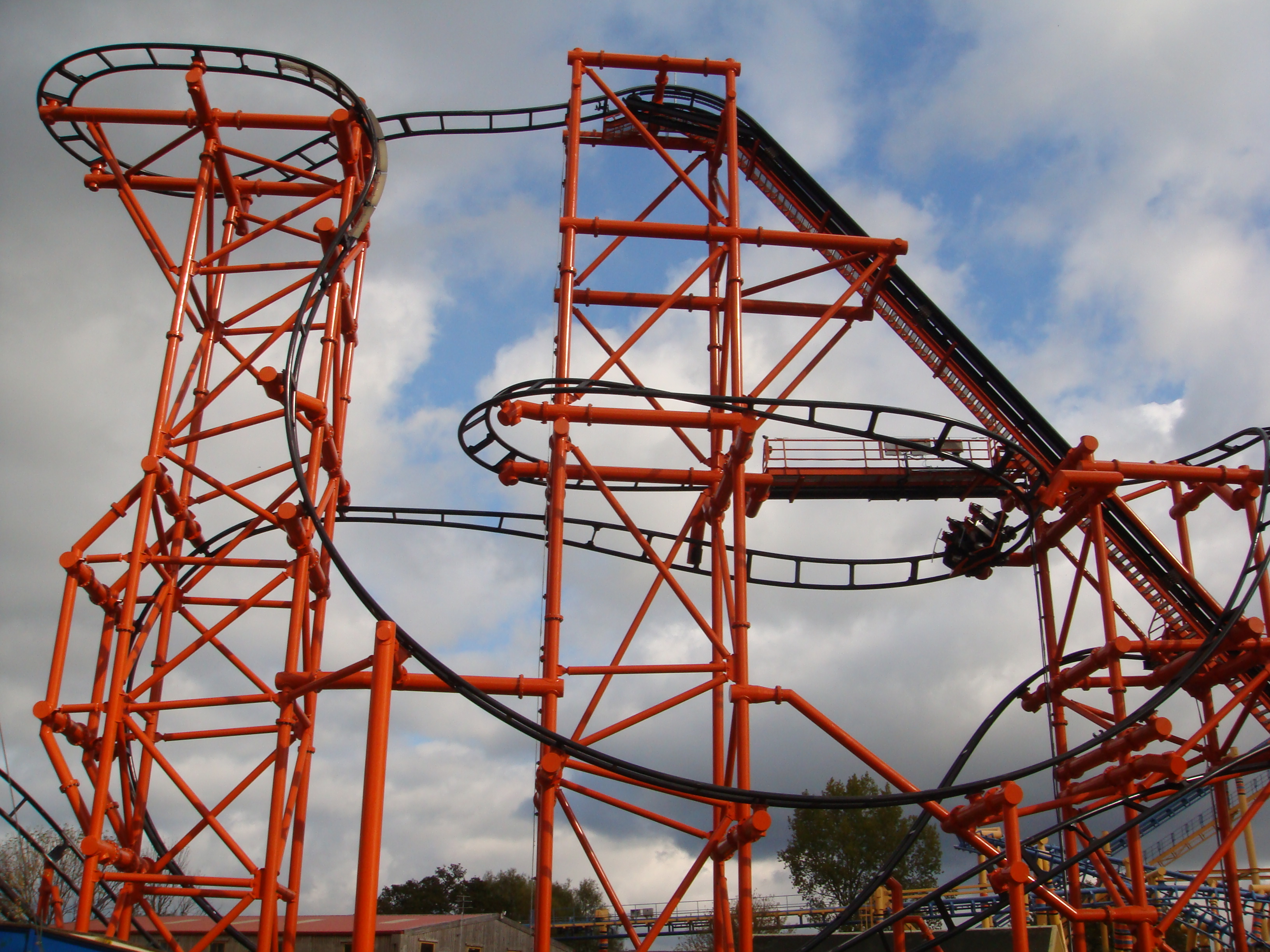
- Mumbo Jumbo

Flamingo Land Resort
- Location: Flamingo Land Resort
- Coordinates: 54.209°N 0.808°W
- Status: Operating
- Opening date: 4 July 2009
- Cost: £4 million
- Replaced: Tidal Wave

General statistics
- Type: Steel
- Manufacturer: S&S – Sansei Technologies
- Designer: Alan Schilke
- Model: El Loco
- Lift/launch system: Chain lift hill
- Height: 98 ft (30 m)
- Inversions: 2
- Max vertical angle: 112°
- G-force: 4
- Height restriction: 48 in (122 cm)
- Mumbo Jumbo at RCDB

Mumbo Jumbo is a roller coaster which opened to the public on 4 July 2009 at Flamingo Land Resort, Kirby Misperton, North Yorkshire, England. Mumbo Jumbo is situated in the Lost Kingdom section of the park and has orange supports and black tracks.

The roller coaster is an El Loco model built by manufacturer S&S – Sansei Technologies; it is 99 feet (30 m) tall, features two inversions and a maximum G force of 4 g.

== History ==
Mumbo Jumbo was manufactured by S&S – Sansei Technologies for a price of £4 million. An El Loco model, the 99-foot-tall (30 m) roller coaster opened to the public on 4 July 2009 as the world's steepest roller coaster. The park stated that the name Mumbo Jumbo is a tongue-in-cheek description of how other parks advertise their new roller coasters.

== Ride experience ==
After being dispatched from the station, trains enter a 180-degree turn before ascending the chain lift hill. At the top of the lift hill, trains navigate a left turn into the ride's 112-degree first drop. They then ascend a hill into another left turn before entering a mid-course brake run. Next, trains traverse an outer-banked turn into a dive loop, then ascend into a second mid-course brake run. Afterwards, trains make a left turn into a downwards in-line twist, then enter an elevated turn before the final brake run.

== Records ==
The roller coaster's maximum vertical angle is 112 degrees, making it the world's steepest roller coaster from 4 July 2009 until 16 July 2011. The official park press release stated that the Mumbo Jumbo opening will be attended by representatives of Guinness World Records. Andrea Banfi of Guinness World Records said: "We will be in attendance at the opening of Flamingo Land's new roller coaster and look forward to this new Guinness World Records record in the 'Steepest roller coaster made from steel' category".

This record was previously held by another S&S El Loco, Steel Hawg in Indiana Beach. Mumbo Jumbo's record was surpassed by Timber Drop, an S&S El Loco with a 113.1-degree drop at Fraispertuis City in France.

Preceded by Steel Hawg; 111°	World's steepest roller coaster July 4, 2009 – July 1, 2011; 112°	Succeeded by Timber Drop; 113.1°

== Incident ==
On 3 May 2010, one of the cars stopped on an inverted section of the ride due to a poncho blowing into the wheels. Two passengers were upside down for 20 minutes before being safely removed from the ride by the park's operations team.
