= Timber Drop =

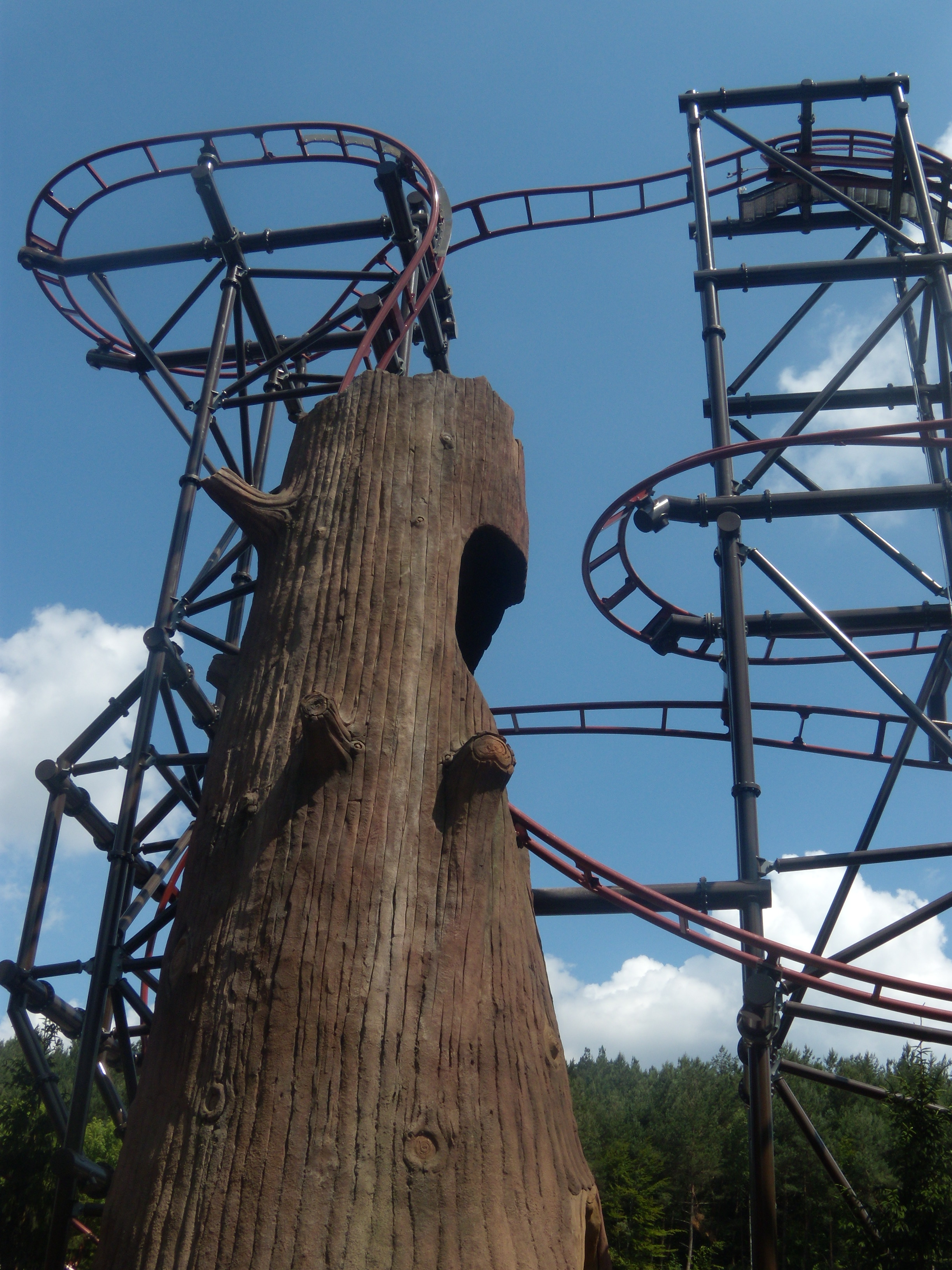
- First hill on Timber Drop

Fraispertuis City
- Location: Fraispertuis City
- Coordinates: 48.3242°N 6.7295°E
- Status: Operating
- Opening date: 12 July 2011
- Cost: €3,000,000

General statistics
- Type: Steel
- Manufacturer: S&S – Sansei Technologies
- Model: El Loco
- Height: 29.26 m (96.0 ft)
- Speed: 66 km/h (41 mph)
- Inversions: 2
- Duration: 1:20
- Max vertical angle: 113.1°
- Height restriction: 122 cm (4 ft 0 in)
- Timber Drop at RCDB

Timber Drop is a steel roller coaster located at the Fraispertuis City amusement park in Jeanménil, France. With a slope of 113.1°, the coaster held the world record for the steepest drop in the world from 1 July 2011 to 16 July 2011, and currently holds the record for the steepest roller coaster drop in Europe.

== History ==
On 8 October 2010 at the trade show of the Euro Attractions Show in Rome, Fraispertuis City finalized the purchase of a new roller coaster to be built by S&S – Sansei Technologies. Named Timber Drop, the coaster was inaugurated on 1 July 2011 and opened to the public the next day.

The coaster is an "El Loco" model, of which there are variants in five other parks. When Timber Drop was installed, two other El Loco coasters existed: One named Steel Hawg at Indiana Beach in the United States and another named Mumbo Jumbo at Flamingo Land Theme Park & Zoo in England. Steel Hawg (opened in 2008) and Mumbo Jumbo (opened in 2009) were holders of the world's steepest roller coaster drops of 111° and 112° respectively. Timber Drop had a steeper-than-vertical drop of 113.1°, which allowed it to win the title when opening. However, this record was exceeded fifteen days later, with the opening of Takabisha (121°) at Fuji-Q Highland in Japan on 16 July 2011.

With a total budget of 4 million euros, Timber drop represented the largest investment in the park since its inception. More than one million euros is spent on decoration and arrangement of attraction, entrusted to the company Artistic Concrete Workshop. The theme of the attraction is that of redwoods. Trains pass through several tree stumps during the run. Various cut logs decorate the area surrounding the attraction.

Since its opening, a counter was set up on the attraction, to count the number of visitors riding Timber Drop. The park, in partnership with the association "Trees for Life" decided to educate visitors on the issue of deforestation. Fraispertuis City committed to donate money to replant and maintain one tree for every 500 riders. In 2011, the park has recorded 146,500 riders, which led to the replanting of 293 trees in Benin.

Preceded by Mumbo Jumbo; 112°	World's steepest roller coaster 7 July 2011 – 15 July 2011; 113.1°	Succeeded by Takabisha; 121°
