= Crazy Bird =

Roller coaster

Happy Valley Tianjin
- Location: Happy Valley Tianjin
- Coordinates: 39.184731°N 117.468590°E
- Status: Operating
- Opening date: 22 December 2013

General statistics
- Type: Steel – Indoor
- Manufacturer: S&S – Sansei Technologies
- Designer: Alan Schilke
- Model: El Loco
- Lift/launch system: Chain lift hill
- Drop: 30 m (98 ft)
- Length: 390 m (1,280 ft)
- Inversions: 2
- Max vertical angle: 120°
- Trains: 4 trains with a single car; riders arranged 2 across in 2 rows for a total of 4 riders per train
- Crazy Bird at RCDB

Crazy Bird (Chinese: 愤怒的小鸟) is an indoor steel roller coaster at Happy Valley Tianjin, an amusement park in Dongli District, Tianjin, China. The coaster has one of the steepest drops of any roller coaster in the world.

== Overview and features ==
Built by S&S – Sansei Technologies, Crazy Bird is one of six "El Loco" model roller coasters in the world. It is also an indoor coaster, and has been cited by Funworld Magazine as an example of the increased prevalence of indoor coasters that occur in Asia versus coasters on other continents. Funworld Magazine argued that this is due to climatic factors involving the rainy season in much of Asia. The coaster has occasionally been marketed to take advantage of the Angry Birds franchise (the Chinese characters "愤怒" mean angry and not crazy), but the theming for the coaster does not fit the Angry Birds style.

Crazy Bird is most notable for the steeper-than-vertical (120-degree) drop on its first hill, giving the coaster one of the steepest first drops in the world. The coaster also has sharply banked turns, as well as two inversions (a dive loop and an inline twist). Park guests ride the coaster in individual 4-seat cars which have onboard speakers. Crazy Bird is the only El Loco coaster in Asia.

== Incidents ==
On 26 July 2014, an incident occurred where four riders were stranded 20 metres (66 ft) above the ground. Park staff failed to restart the train and the riders were forced to exit on foot. Reports indicated that a similar event had occurred in early April of the same year.

== Reviews ==
Theme Park Investigator identified the coaster as number 5 in the top 5 most anticipated roller coasters for 2013.
