= Happy Valley Tianjin =

Theme park in Tianjin, China

- View of park
- Interactive map of Happy Valley Tianjin
- Location: Tianjin, China
- Coordinates: 39.188304°N 117.460858°E
- Status: Operating
- Opened: July 27, 2013

Attractions
- Roller coasters: 4
- Website: tj.happyvalley.cn

Happy Valley Tianjin (simplified Chinese: 天津欢乐谷; traditional Chinese: 天津歡樂谷; pinyin: Tiānjīn Huānlè Gǔ) is a theme park in Dongli District, Tianjin, China. Opened on 27 July 2013, it is the sixth installation of the Happy Valley theme park chain.

== Notable rides ==
Name	Type	Manufacturer	Model	Opened	Other statistics
Crazy Bird	Steel	S&S Worldwide	El Loco	2013	Length: 1,279.5 ft (390.0 m); Height: 98.4 ft (30.0 m); Inversions: 2; Max Vertical Angle: 120°
Fjord Flying Dragon	Wood	Martin & Vleminckx	Wood Coaster	2013	Length: 3,923.9 feet (1,196.0 m); Height: 109.9 feet (33.5 m)
Mini Coaster	Steel - Junior	Zamperla	Speedy Coaster	2013	Length: 574.2 feet (175.0 m); Height: 29.5 feet (9.0 m); Speed: 18.6 miles per hour (29.9 km/h)
Expedition of Volcano	Steel	Golden Horse	Dual-tracked roller coaster - Mine Train	2013	Unknown
