= Takabisha =

Japanese roller coaster

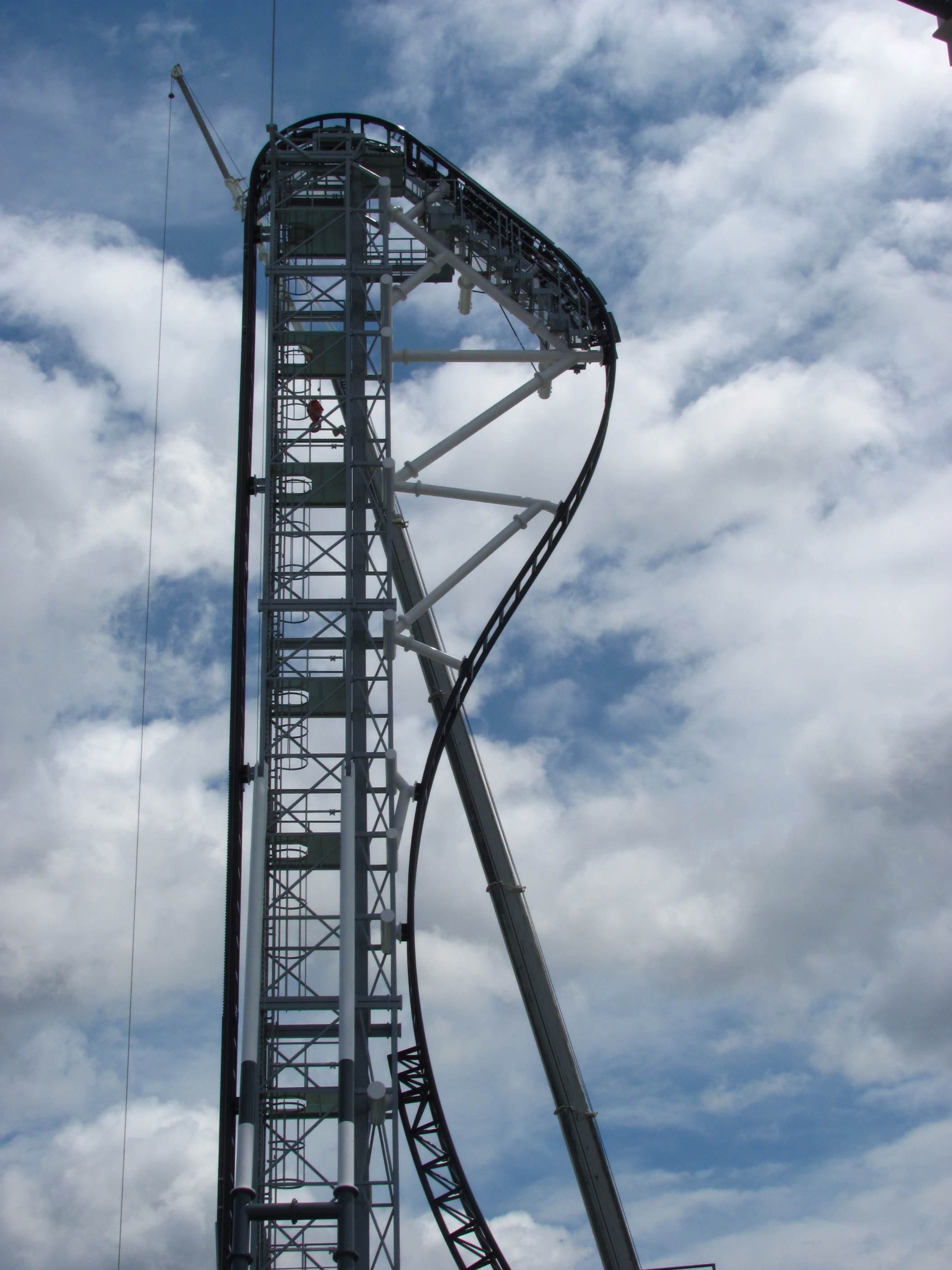
- Takabisha's record-breaking 121° drop.

Fuji-Q Highland
- Location: Fuji-Q Highland
- Coordinates: 35.485340°N 138.779958°E
- Status: Operating
- Opening date: 16 July 2011

General statistics
- Type: Steel – Launched – Euro-Fighter
- Manufacturer: Gerstlauer
- Model: 1000
- Lift/launch system: Linear motor launch, chain lift hill
- Height: 43 m (141 ft)
- Drop: 42 m (138 ft)
- Length: 1,000 m (3,300 ft)
- Speed: 100 km/h (62 mph)
- Inversions: 7
- Duration: 1:52
- Max vertical angle: 121°
- Acceleration: 0 to 100 km/h (0 to 62 mph) in 2 seconds
- G-force: 4.4
- Height restriction: 125 cm (4 ft 1 in)
- Trains: Several trains with a single car; riders arranged 4 across in 2 rows for a total of 8 riders per train
- Takabisha at RCDB

Takabisha (高飛車) is a Gerstlauer Euro-Fighter steel roller coaster located at Fuji-Q Highland in Fujiyoshida, Yamanashi, Japan. It opened on 16 July 2011, and is known for having a drop angle of 121°. It was the steepest coaster in the world before it was overtaken in 2019 by TMNT Shellraiser at American Dream in New Jersey. The Japanese name Takabisha translates to "high-handed" or "domineering" in English. The name is a pun, in that the three kanji in the name literally mean "high fly car".

== History ==
On 11 May 2011, Fuji-Q Highland announced that they would be opening Takabisha, the world's steepest roller coaster. Testing for the ride began around 8 June 2011, with media and invited guests allowed to ride Takabisha early. The ride officially opened to the public on 16 July 2011.

== Ride ==
Takabisha is a custom Gerstlauer Euro-Fighter roller coaster. The 1,000-metre (3,300 ft) ride begins with a sudden drop into pitch black darkness before entering a slow heartline roll. In just two seconds, the car is launched by linear motors down a 63-metre (207 ft) long tunnel to a speed of 100 kilometres per hour (62 mph). It then exits the station building and directly into a large corkscrew. Immediately following the exit of this inversion, the car goes into a banana roll, another corkscrew, and two airtime hills. The ride is slowed on a set of block brakes and returns to the station building. The track then turns a sharp 180° turn to the right before going back out of the building and onto the vertical chain lift hill. This hill takes riders up to a height of 43 metres (141 ft). Once at the top, the car slowly inches towards the 121° beyond-vertical drop. Once the car is released from the top of the hill, it falls down towards the ground and enters a dive loop, an inverted top hat, and the seventh inversion, an immelmann loop. The ride is approximately 2 minutes long.

== Records ==
When Takabisha opened on 16 July 2011, it gained the Guinness World Record for the steepest roller coaster made from steel. It took the world record from Fraispertuis City's Timber Drop roller coaster, which had gained the record only two weeks earlier. Timber Drop's record was set at 113.1°, while Takabisha's drop measures at an angle of 121°.

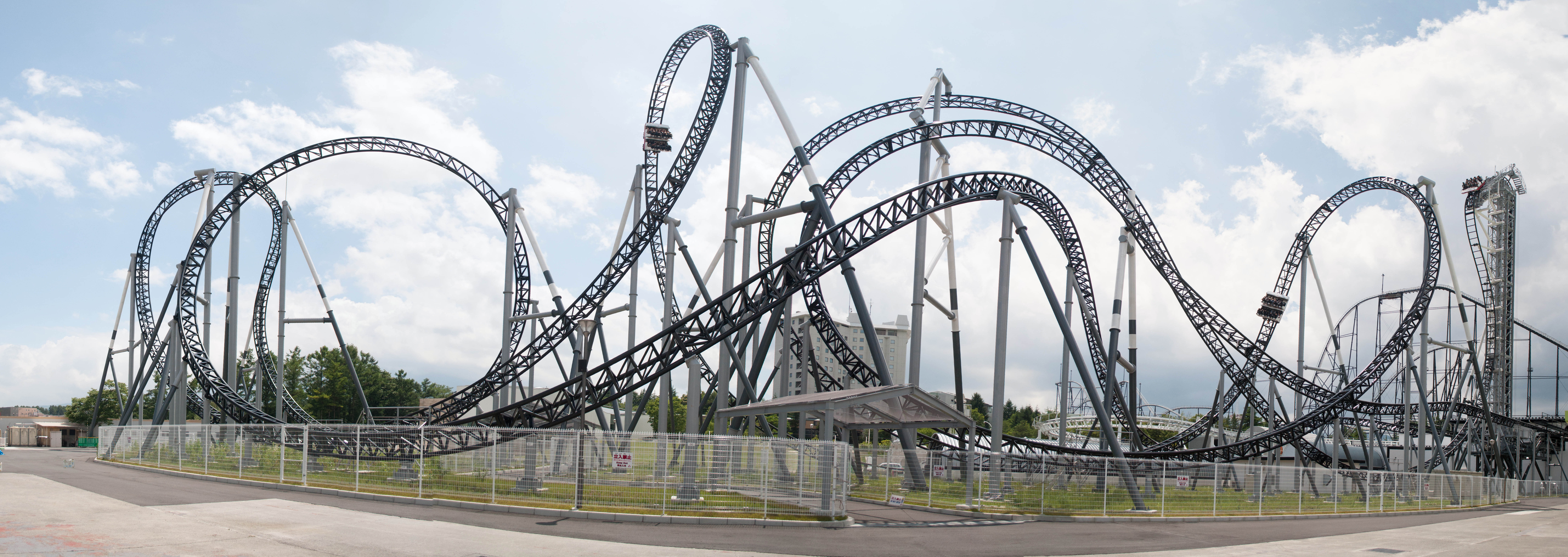

Preceded by Timber Drop; 113.1°	World's steepest roller coaster 16 July 2011 – 25 October 2019; 121°	Succeeded by TMNT Shellraiser; 121.5°

== See also ==
- 2011 in amusement parks
