= Steel Hawg =

Roller coaster in Monticello, Indiana

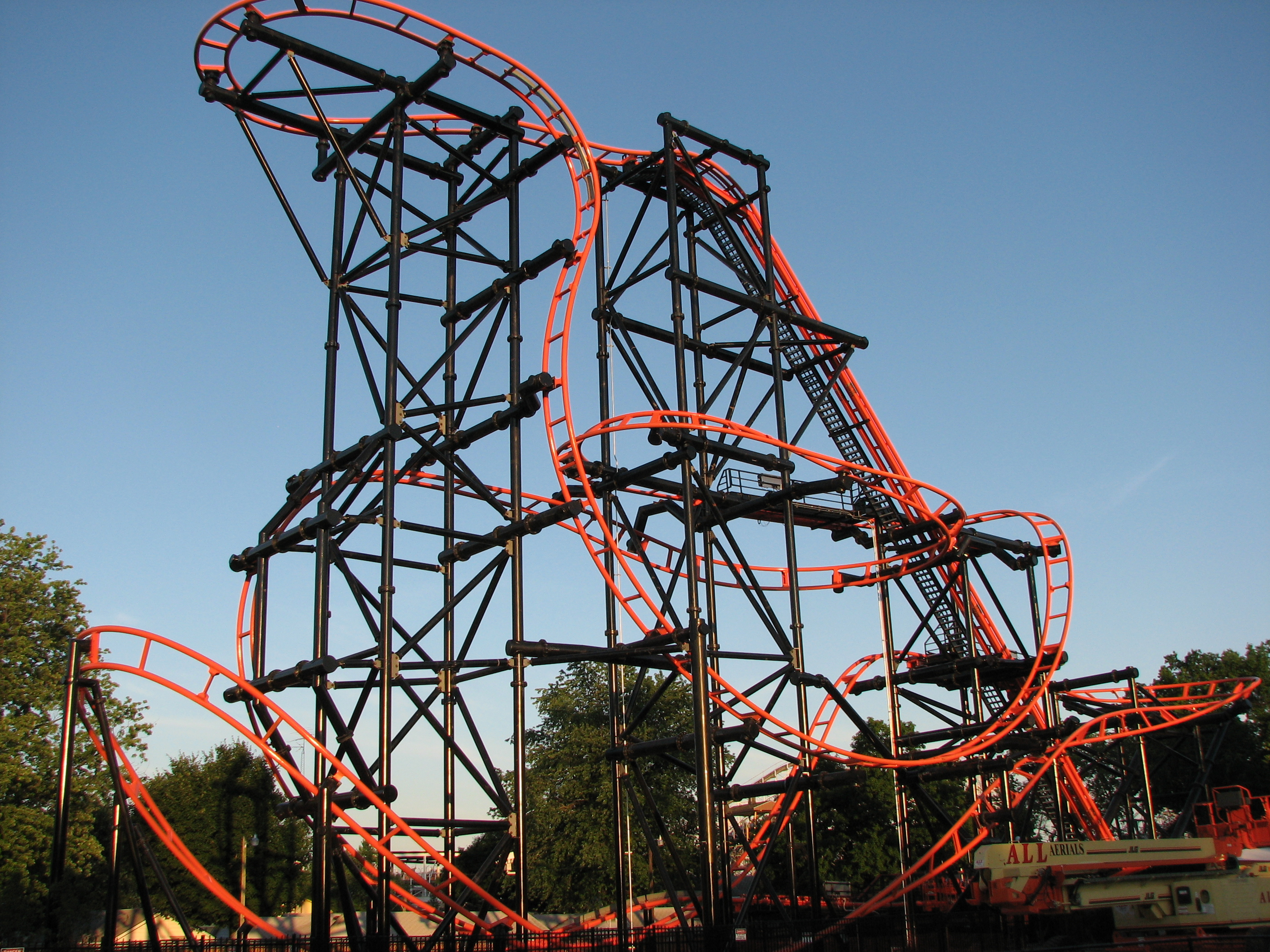

Indiana Beach
- Location: Indiana Beach
- Coordinates: 40.790911°N 86.771843°W
- Status: Operating
- Opening date: July 5, 2008

General statistics
- Type: Steel
- Manufacturer: S&S – Sansei Technologies
- Designer: Alan Schilke
- Model: El Loco
- Lift/launch system: Chain lift hill
- Height: 96 ft (29 m)
- Speed: 41 mph (66 km/h)
- Inversions: 2
- Max vertical angle: 111°
- Height restriction: 48 in (122 cm)
- Trains: 4 trains with a single car. Riders are arranged 2 across in 2 rows for a total of 4 riders per train.
- Steel Hawg at RCDB

Steel Hawg is a steel roller coaster located at Indiana Beach, Monticello, Indiana. The ride is the first El Loco model built by manufacturer S&S Worldwide (now S&S – Sansei Technologies) of Logan, Utah. The ride was installed by Ride Entertainment Group.

Steel Hawg was expected to open in mid-May 2008, but was rescheduled for an early July opening.

Steel Hawg opened to the public on July 5, 2008. The ride contains a 111 degree drop, two inversions, and several twists and turns. It also includes the world's first "outside" turn, where the rider banks to the left and turns right or vice versa.

Whilst it was originally planned that Steel Hawg would have a 120° drop, the design was simplified such that the drop is just 111°.

Steel Hawg was the world's steepest roller coaster prior to the opening of Mumbo Jumbo, on July 4, 2009, at Flamingo Land, United Kingdom. Mumbo Jumbo is also an S&S El Loco; it has a 112° drop. It still had the third steepest drop of all coasters in North America, exceeded only by Cannibal at Lagoon in Utah, which has a 116° drop and TMNT Shellraiser, at Nickelodeon Universe in New Jersey, which has a 121.5° drop.

Steel Hawg was featured in Travel Discoveries "Extreme Terror Rides 2." It was the tallest coaster at the park, and ranked 22 on travel Channel's 101 greatest thrills.

Steel Hawg can run up to 4 trains at a time, but the park typically chooses to run only 1 or 2 due to limited attendance.

Preceded by Fahrenheit; Rage; Speed: No Limits; SpongeBob SquarePants Rock Bottom Plunge; Typhoon; Vild-Svinet; 97°	World's steepest roller coaster 5 July 2008 - 4 July 2009; 111°	Succeeded by Mumbo Jumbo; 112°
