= Fraispertuis City =

Amusement park in France

- Interactive map of Fraispertuis City
- Location: Jeanménil, Vosges, France
- Coordinates: 48.324°N 6.729°E
- Opened: 1966
- Owner: The Fleurent Family

Attractions
- Total: 25
- Roller coasters: 3
- Water rides: 3
- Website: www.fraispertuis-city.fr

Fraispertuis City is a theme park in Jeanménil, France. It opened in 1966.

Its roller coaster Timber Drop, created by S&S Power, was the steepest in the world when it opened on July 2, 2011, but it lost the record with the opening on July 16, 2011, of Takabisha at Fuji-Q Highland in Japan.

== Gallery ==
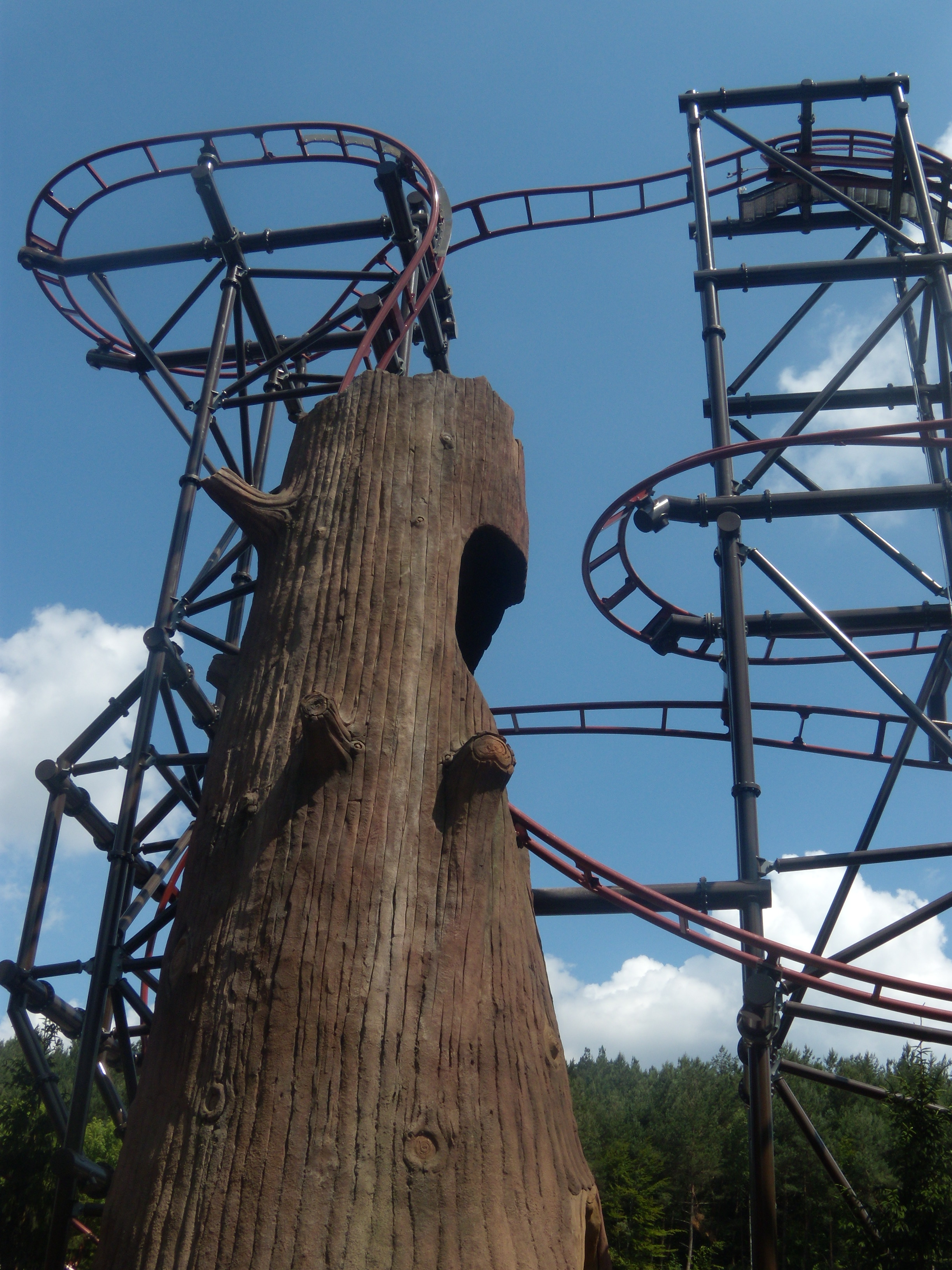
Timber Drop

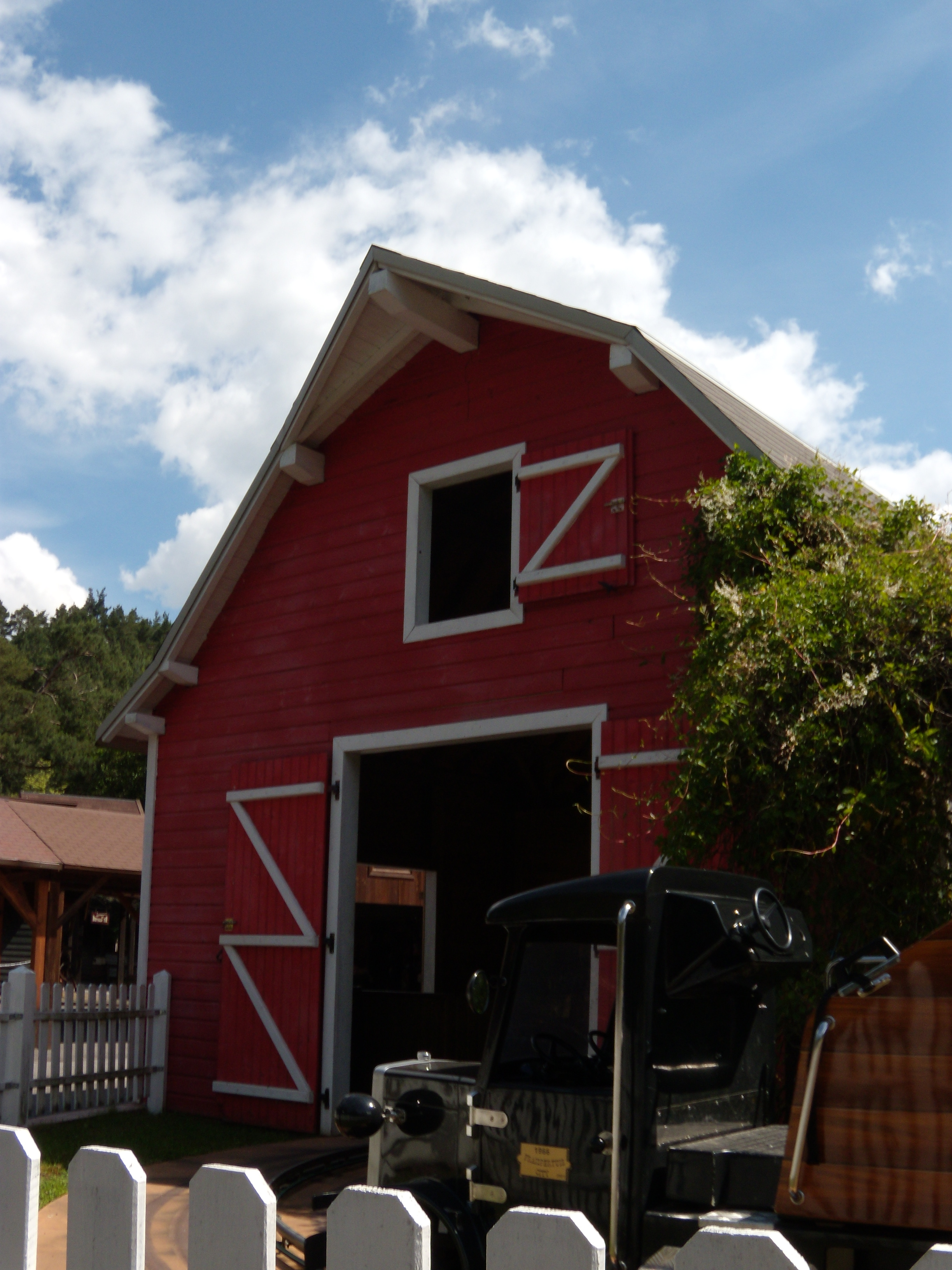
Old America

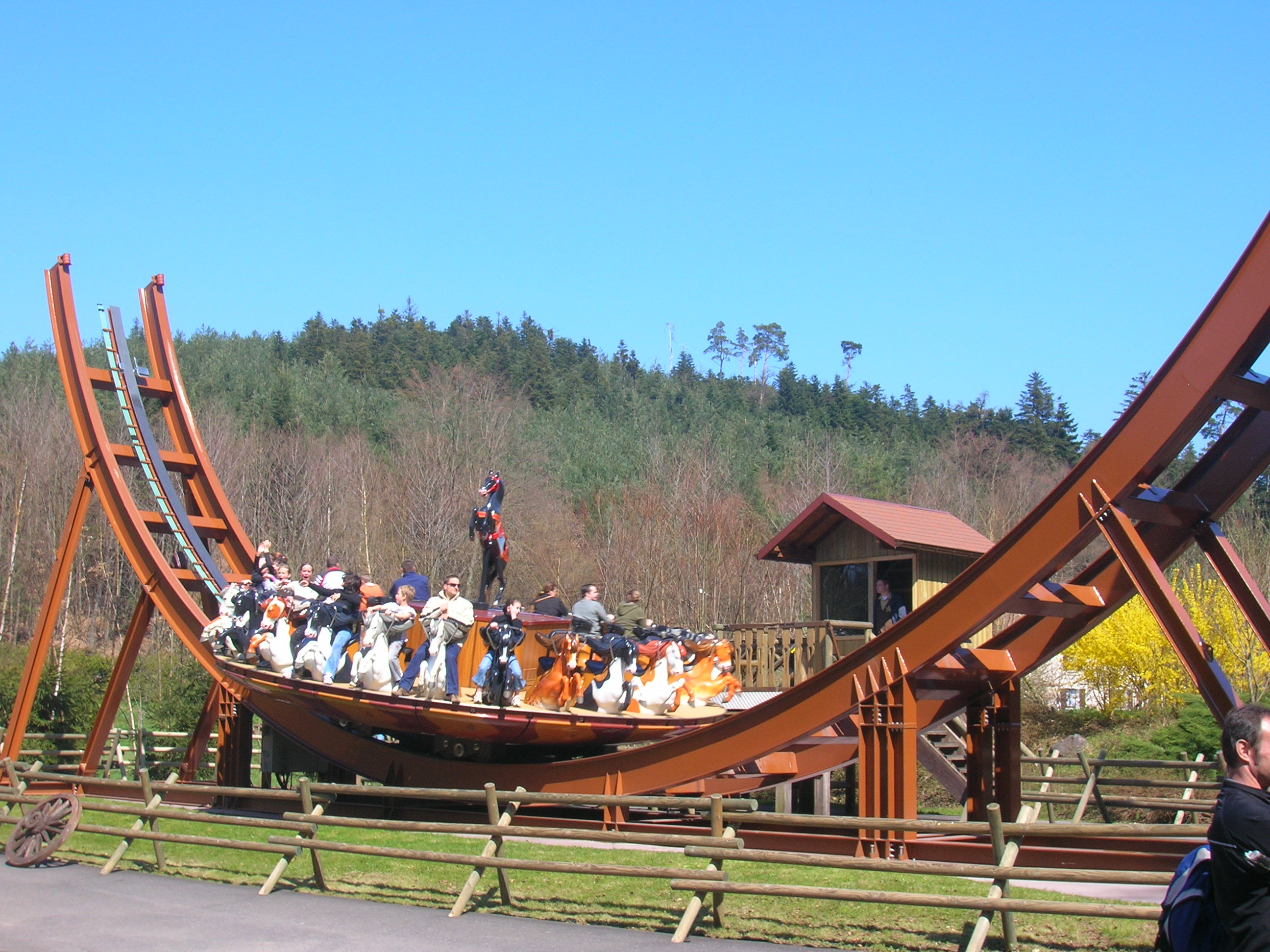
La Cavalerie

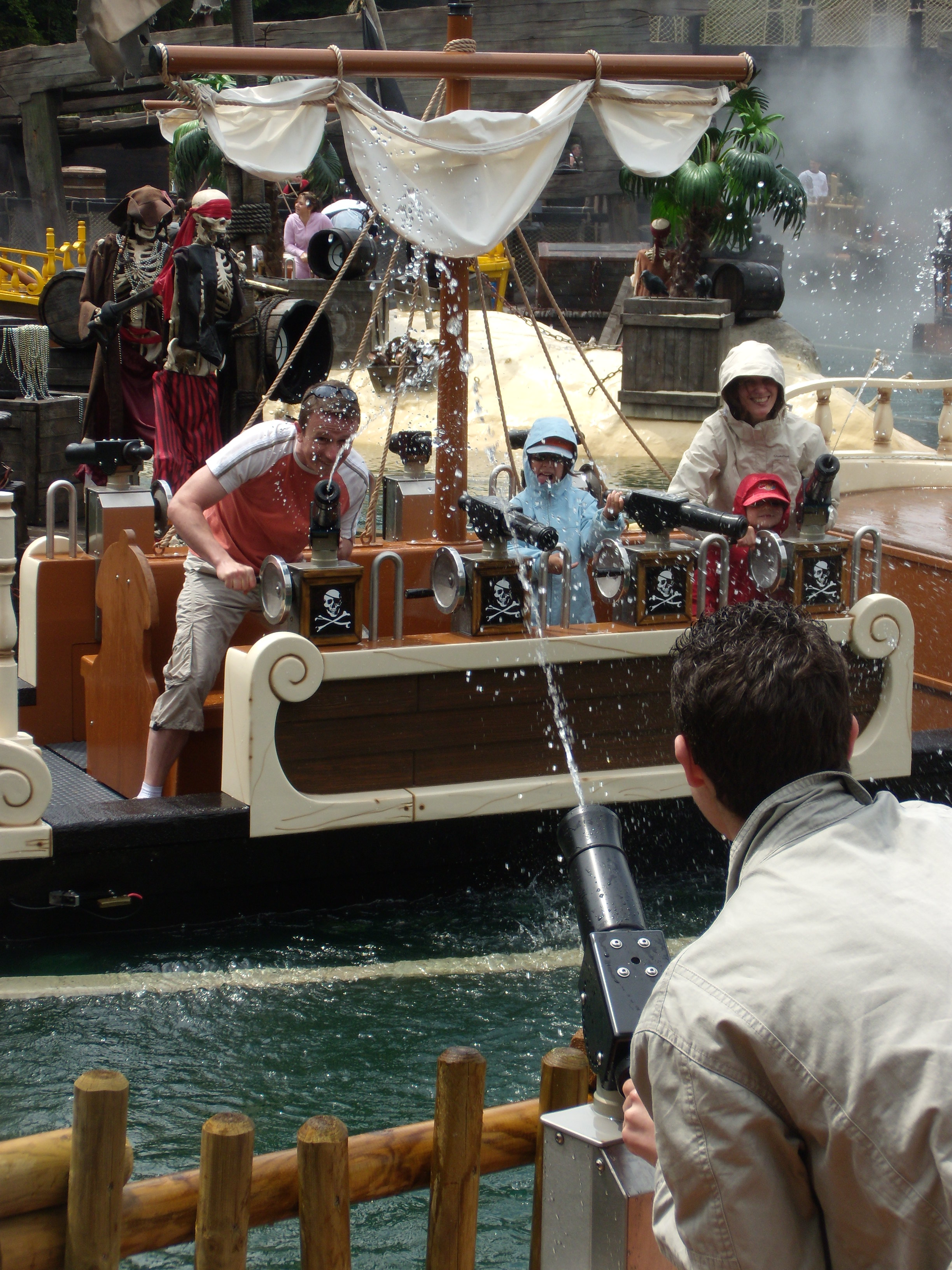
Pirates Attack

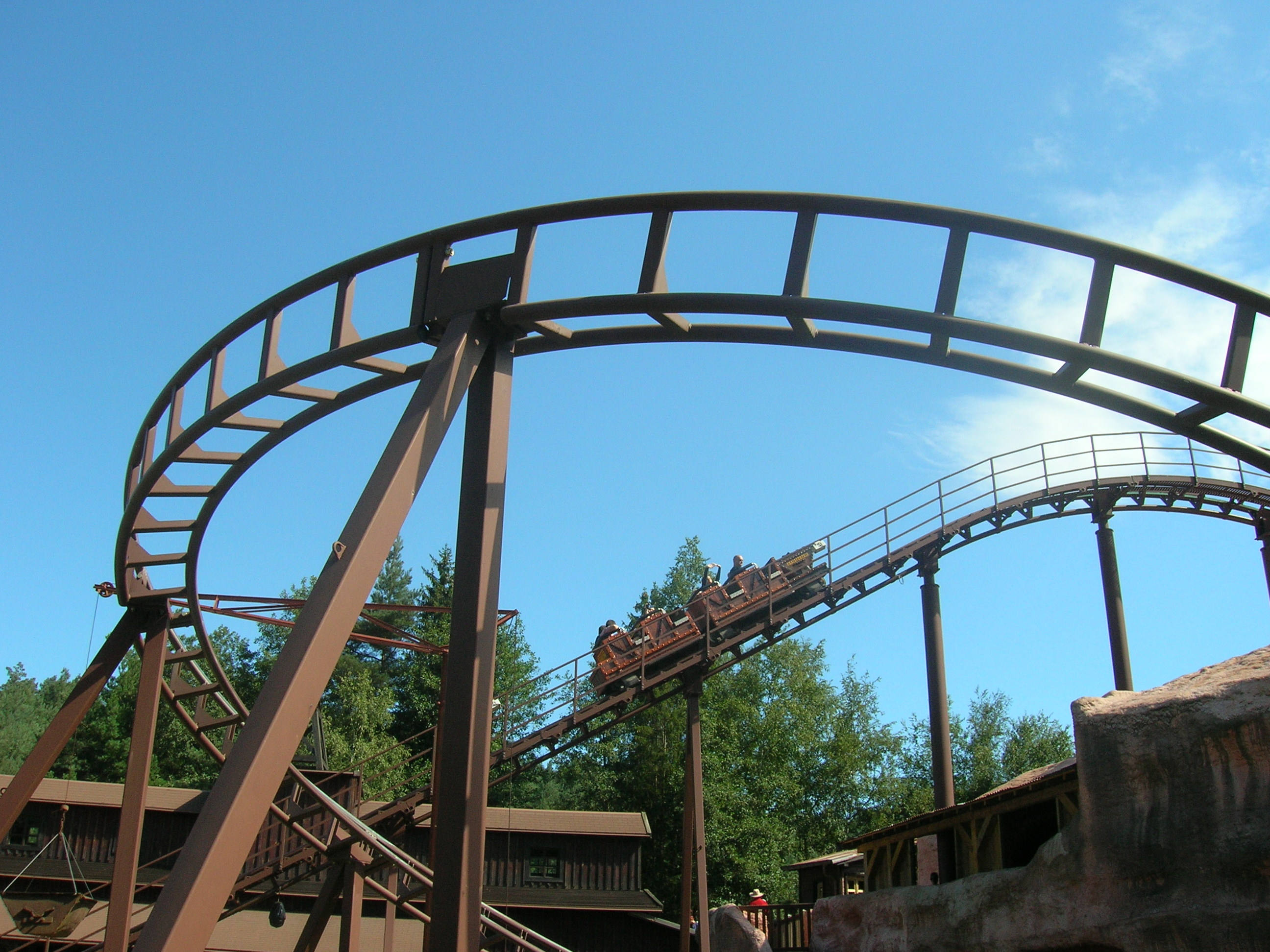
Grand Canyon
