= Arrastão =

Arrastão may refer to:

- Arrastão (robbery), a form of flash robbery in Brazil
- Arrastão (capoeira), a capoeira move

== Music ==
- Arrastão (album), a Sertanejo album
- Arrastão (song), a song by Vinicius de Moraes, Edu Lobo, and Elis Regina

=== Samba schools ===
- Arrastão de Cascadura, a samba school in Rio de Janeiro
- Arrastão da Gamboa, a samba school in Cabo Frio
- Arrastão da Lagoinha, a samba school in Nova Iguaçu
- Arrastão de São João, a samba school in São João de Meriti
