= Marcelo Cardoso =

Brazilian businessman (born 1966)

Marcelo Lopes Cardoso
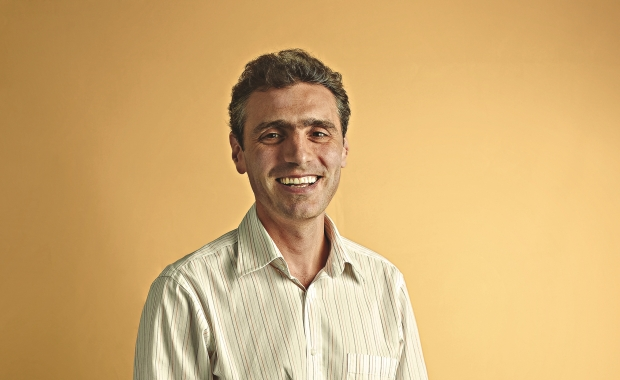
- Born: August 3, 1966 (age 59); São Paulo, Brazil
- Known for: Metaintegral Associates CEO

Marcelo Lopes Cardoso (born August 3, 1966) is a Brazilian businessman from São Paulo. He is CEO for Metaintegral Associates, a company based in Sao Francisco that apply Business transformation grounded in Integral Theory leveraging scientific evidence from areas such as psychology, neuroscience, social science, complex theory. He is the founder and president of Instituto Integral Brasil.

== Education ==
Cardoso holds a Bachelor of Business Administration (B.B.A) degree from Faculdade Campos Salles that included an undergraduate sandwich program at Northwestern University in Chicago, Illinois.

== Career ==
From 1986 to 1996, he was the CFO of Metódo Engenharia. He left the company to join GP Investimentos with the role of CFO at Playcenter. In 1997, when he was 31, he was invited to start up and operate the theme park Hopi Hari, which is one of the largest of its kind of Latin America. After five years, his departure from Hopi Hari’s presidency was announced in 2002.

In 2003, he prepared the start-up of the real estate asset Hedging-Griffo.

From 2004 to 2008, he was the executive director and Latin America regional president of DBM, a consulting firm that specializes in people management.

From 2008 to 2013, he had the position of senior vice-president of organizational development and sustainability of Natura, a Brazilian cosmetic giant. He was responsible for the implementation of the Natura management system, which comprises the company’s strategy, general management, people management and leadership development projects. In 2010 he was appointed as executive of the year by human resources magazine Você RH for his role as Natura’s organizational development and sustainability vice-president.

In 2013, he joined Grupo Fleruy, a Brazilian firm working within the fields of medicine and health. He was SVP of people, strategy, innovation, and sustainability.

Cardoso is also the president of Instituto Integral Brasil, a non-governmental organization. The entity works under the mission of presenting and sustaining emerging and permeable networks in the segments of business, health & well-being, education, and sustainability. Instituto Integral Brazil is linked to Integral Institute, which was established in the United States.

During 2013, Cardoso was a member of the Creation Committee of CONARH 2013 – 39º Congresso Nacional de Gestão de Pessoas (39th National Congress of People Management). The event was promoted by ABRH-Nacional (Brazilian Association of Human Resources). In 2014, Marcelo was elected as one of the 100 leaders with the best reputation in Brazil by Merco, a European consultancy and one of the most admired Human Resource professionals of Brazil by Gestão & RH Magazine.

Since 2014, Marcelo has been called upon as a consultant by both Brazilian and Multinational firms to support complex strategic and human resources problems. Some of his current clients are Eileen Fisher, IBM, Fazenda Toca, Sequoia and iFractal.

Cardoso is also a speaker, coach and facilitator. He provides support and contributes to programs of Instituto Evoluir, an organization that develops short term courses within the fields of psychology, health, education, and organizational practices. Marcelo has taken part in dozens of live web casts in Brazil where he re-interprets current news through the lens of Integral Theory and practice.
