= Montezum =

Wooden rollercoaster in São Paulo, Brazil

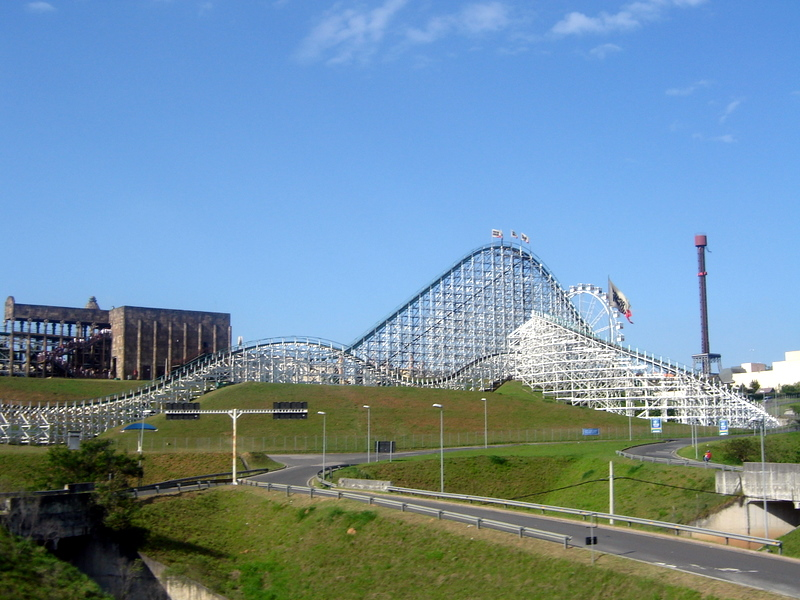

Hopi Hari
- Location: Hopi Hari
- Coordinates: 23.098682°S 47.010926°W
- Status: Operating
- Opening date: 1999

General statistics
- Type: Wood
- Manufacturer: Roller Coaster Corporation of America
- Lift/launch system: Chain Lift
- Drop: 42.4 m (139 ft)
- Length: 1,030 m (3,380 ft)
- Speed: 103 km/h (64 mph)
- Inversions: 0
- Restraint style: Seat Belt / Lap Bar
- Height restriction: 140 cm (4 ft 7 in)
- Trains: 2 trains with 5 cars. Riders are arranged 2 across in 3 rows for a total of 30 riders per train.
- Montezum at RCDB

Montezum is a wooden roller coaster located in Hopi Hari theme park, in São Paulo, Brazil. The ride is able to exceed 103 kilometres per hour (64 mph) and runs through the ride in fifty-eight seconds. It is the only wooden roller coaster operating in South America.

This roller coaster was built in 18 months. More than 1500 people of the RCCA (Roller Coaster Corporation of America) worked to build Montezum. It was finished in 6 months before the park opening in November, 1999.

The trains were built by Philadelphia Toboggan Coasters. The ride has two trains with four cars and the passengers are arranged two across in three rows. It is located in Mistieri area of the park. Mistieri means Mystery in Hopi Hari's language, an old archaeological site found during the construction of the capital.

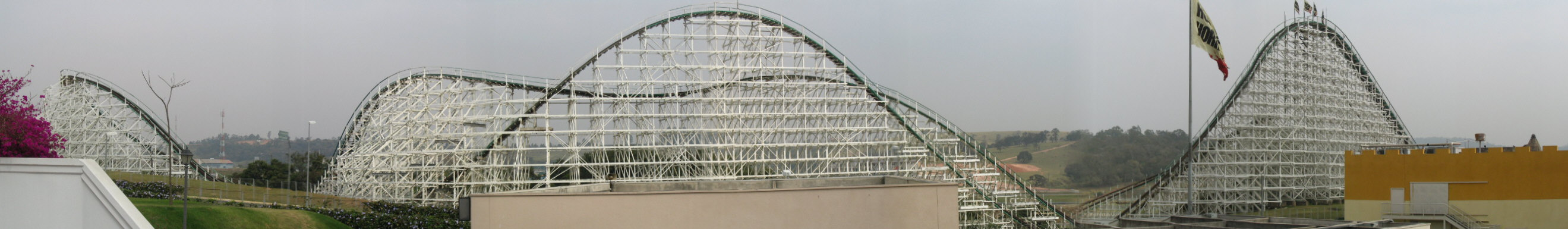
Montezum's panorama
