= Hopi Hari =

Brazilian theme park

- Previously known as Playcenter Great Adventure

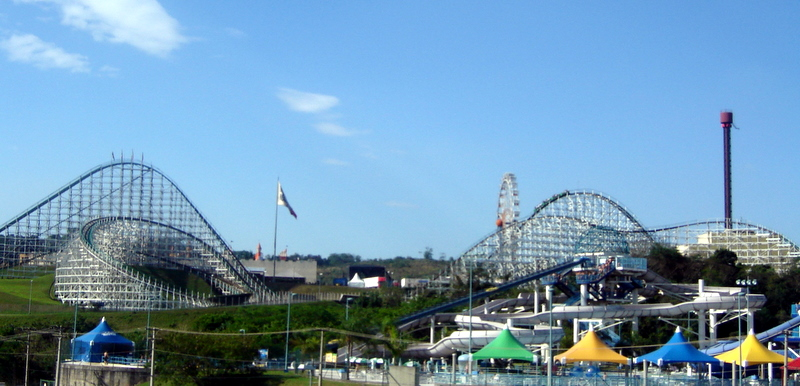
- Hopi Hari's Skyline
- Interactive map of Hopi Hari
- Location: Vinhedo, São Paulo, Brazil
- Coordinates: 23°5′48.98″S 47°0′38.69″W
- Opened: November 27, 1999
- General manager: Alexandre Rodrigues
- Theme: Imaginary country
- Slogan: "The Most Fun Country in the World"
- Operating season: Thursday to Sunday and holidays, from 11:00 am to 8:30 pm.
- Area: 076 km^{2} (29 sq mi)

Attractions
- Total: 35
- Roller coasters: 4
- Water rides: 2
- Website: www.hopihari.com.br/

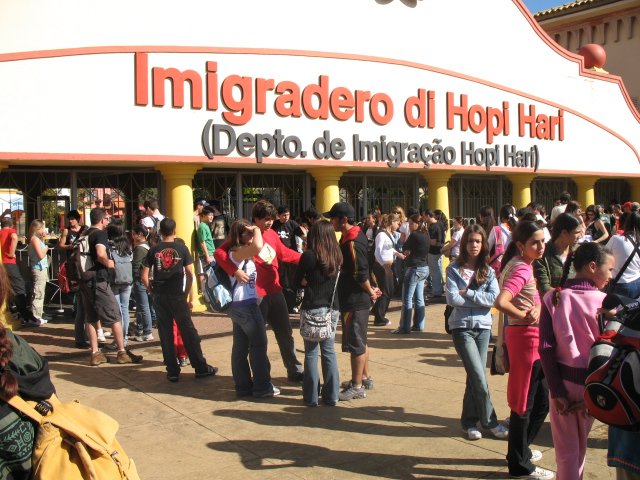
Hopi Hari's Entrance

Hopi Hari is a Brazilian theme park located at Km 72 of Bandeirantes Highway, Vinhedo, in the state of São Paulo. It is located 30 km away from Campinas and 72 km away from São Paulo. Covering an area of 0.76 km^{2}, it is considered the second largest amusement park in Brazil and is a part of the tourist complex SerrAzul Full Life. Due to the debts of the park in June 2009, the group GP Investments sold the park for a symbolic value to the group HH II PT S/A.

== History ==
Opened on November 27, 1999, Hopi Hari was designed and built by International Theme Park Services Inc., a U.S. company located in Cincinnati, Ohio which based the design of the park on Kings Island, a theme park also located in Cincinnati. Originally, the park would be called "Playcenter Great Adventure" as it belonged to the Playcenter Group. Due to the Brazilian economic crisis in the 1990s, it was forced to sell while still under construction as a consequence of the reduction in visitors at Playcenter. The company GP Investments took over operations, where the park project has undergone several changes, including a name change to "Hopi Hari."

=== Tourist and Economic Importance ===
Due to its close proximity to large urban centers like São Paulo and Campinas, the park has an important role for the economy and tourism in the state of São Paulo and Brazil. The park is part of the complex SerrAzul Full Life which also includes Wet 'n Wild water park, Shopping SerrAzul, the Premium Outlet shopping center, the Quality Resort Hotel and Itupeva SerraAzul Farm subdivision. This complex attracts more than 5 million Brazilian tourists a year (number equal to the amount of foreign tourists to Brazil received in 2008) surpassing even tourist spots known as Christ the Redeemer, one of the Seven Wonders of the modern world, and the Sugar Loaf mountain in Rio de Janeiro, which together received only 1.9 million tourists (Brazilian and foreign) in 2008, according to RioTur. The park hopes to double that amount within 10 years, since it hopes to attract more tourists in agreement with Warner Bros. In 2010, Hopi Hari had a gross revenue of R $103 million, meaning an increase of 25% compared to 2009. Hopi Hari had the biggest increase among parks reporting in previous years, with close to 500,000 additional visitors, driven by a combination of the opening of several major new rides, and very strong economic growth in Brazil.

=== Warner Bros agreement ===
In 2011, Warner Bros. Consumer Products (WBCP) and Hopi Hari, struck a licensing agreement to bring some of the biggest franchises in the world to the park, including characters from the Justice League, Looney Tunes and Penelope Pitstop, with the goal of bringing a more "Hollywoodian" feel to the park. Some characters used were Tweety, Sylvester, Superman, Batman, Bugs Bunny, Aquaman, Taz, and The Flash. Some areas of the park include Infantasia (Looney Tunes characters and Penelope) and Aribabiba (the Justice League characters). The characters of Sesame Street were removed despite being part of the park since its inauguration. The "lore" (story) of the fictional country of Hopi-Hari was very attached to the Sesame Street characters after the deal, will be with other Warner Bros properties. "[...] The entry of the Looney Tunes will be based on a new design in which Bugs Bunny is a millionaire with his inventions and moves in with Daffy Duck. Hopi Hari sends an invitation for them to settle at the park. He accepts the invitation, and brings the whole crew to Infantasia; an ideal place for filming. They also bring all the ACME paraphernalia to the park.After witnessing all the happiness and joy that the park offers, the greatest villains decide to invade Hopi Hari. The goddess Hari calls the Justice League in order to establish the park to prevent the triumph of the villains within the Lore. Aribabiba is in this battle will happen at each attraction. "

=== Management Issues ===
Even with the strong economic potential, the park has always faced great difficulties throughout the years due to factors such as mismanagement, constant changes in administration and some accidents. In its early years, the park did not achieve project revenue thus, preventing new investments and the balance of its construction's debts and resulting in the transfer of the business to new owners in 2009. The best performance the park achieved was between 2010 and 2011, with a high audience, which allowed agreements with brands and sponsorships, such as Warner Bros, in addition to the purchase of a Multi Inversion Roller Coaster from Intamin. Despite the growth, in 2012 the park faced difficulties again after a fatal accident in its free-fall tower. As a result of the accident and sensational media, the park experienced a drop in visitation that triggered more financial issues and security problems. Close to bankruptcy in 2016 and with 700 million Reais in debt, the park again changed management, got a recovery agreement with the court and it was forced to sell the unbuilt 10 inversion roller coaster to pay off a creditor. In 2017 the new management team was able to form agreements to revitalize and repair the park's areas and rides which attracted more visitors. In 2018, the recovery agreement was refuted by one of the largest creditors and after several amendment proposals (including the attempt to buy from another group) it was accepted in 2022. Meanwhile, the park had a new change in management in 2019 that provoked protests among employees.

== Themed areas ==
Hopi Hari is divided into five themed areas: Kaminda Mundi, Mistieri, Infantasia, Aribabiba and Wild West.

=== Kaminda Mundi "Way of the World" ===
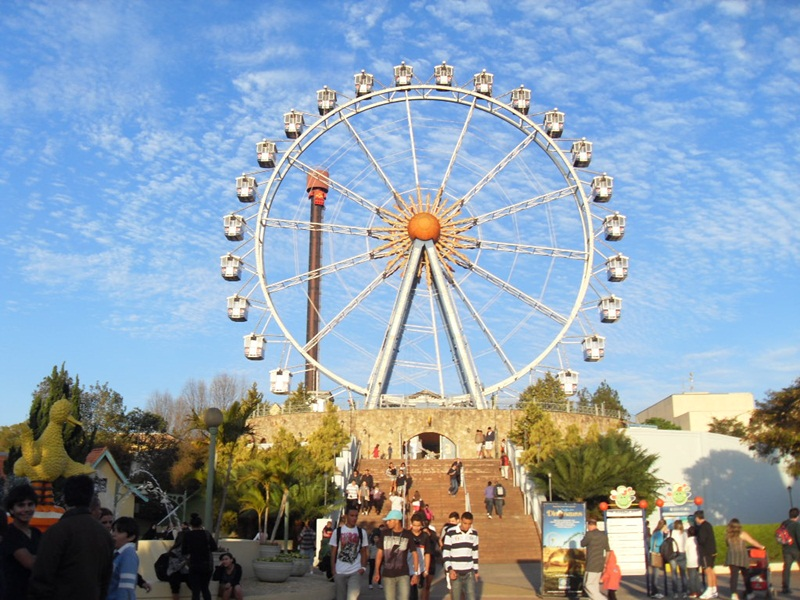
Giranda Mundi

Kaminda Mundi (Way Of The World or World Avenue) is located in Southwest of Hopi Hari and occupies an area of 29,000 m^{2} (is the first region of the park, just after the entrance). It is a tribute to the people of Hopi Hari, their ancestors and their origins (France, Italy, Spain, Portugal, England, Germany and the Netherlands). Kaminda Mundi has the largest theater in Hopi Hari and a 3D cinema.

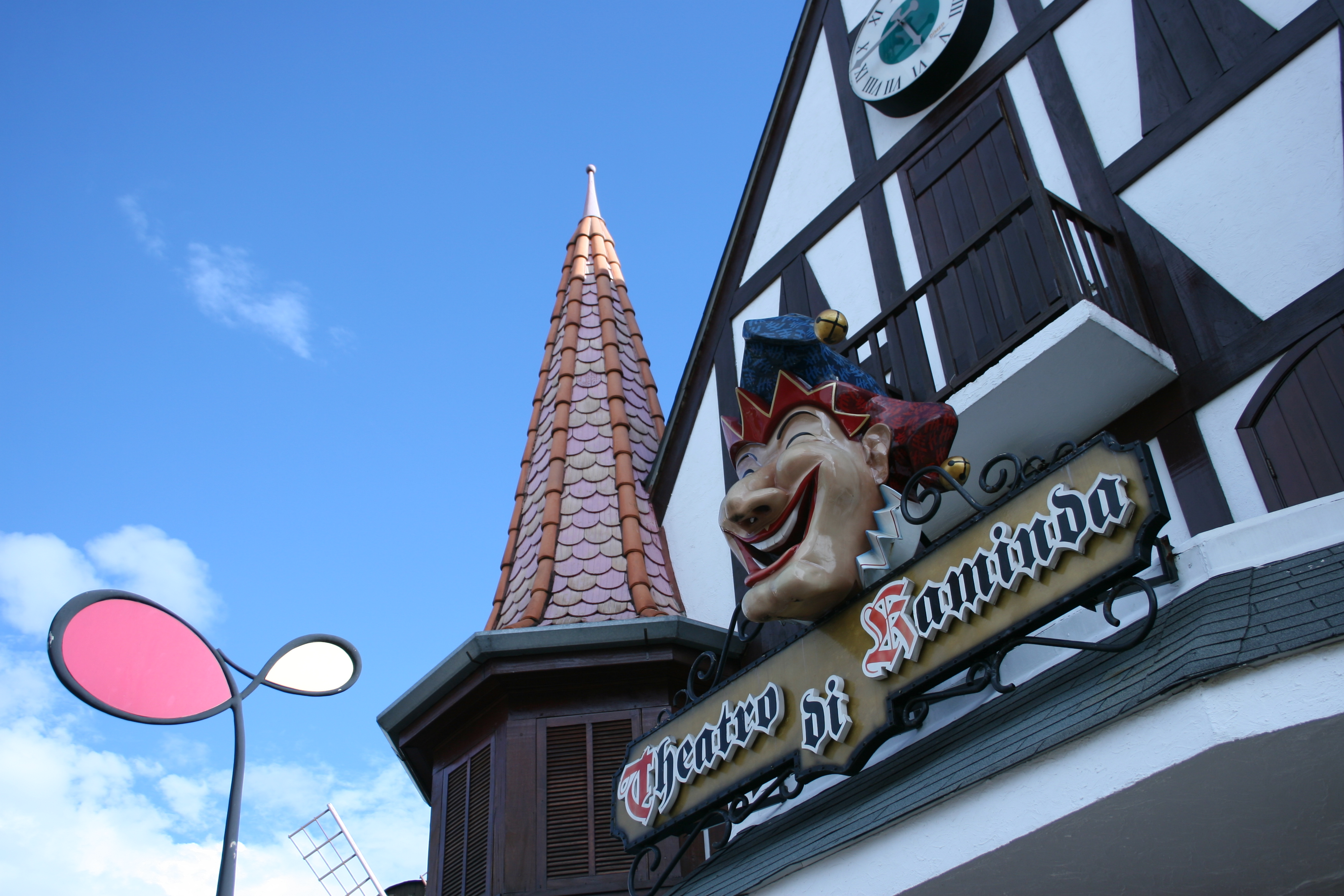
Theatro di Kaminda

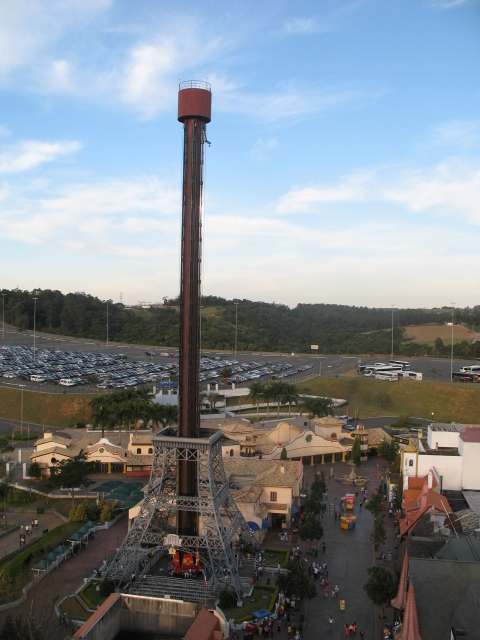
La Tour Eiffel

Kaminda Mundi's Attractions
| Ride | Rating | Year opened | Manufacturer | Status | Description |
|---|---|---|---|---|---|
| Cinétrion | Familiar | 1999 | | SBNO | A 3D cinema that currently serves only for special events, meetings, exhibitions and workshops. |
| Giranda Mundi | Familiar | 1999 | Nauta Bussink | Operating | German Wheel, 44m high, where you get the full panorama of the park. In the 1990s went through Playcenter. |
| Jogaki di Kaminda | Familiar | 1999 | | Operating | Area with carnival games and prizes (Paid separately). |
| Le Voyage | Radical | 1999 | Intamin | Removed | Formerly known as La Tour Eiffel, this is a 69-meter-tall (226 ft) Intamin Giant Drop. Upon reaching the top of the tower, the gondolas are held up there for a few seconds and then released, reaching speeds of 85 km/h in just 4 seconds. Closed since 2012, this attraction was removed in 2026. |
| Theatro di Kaminda | Familiar | 1999 | | Operating | A large theatre with capacity for 847 people with a mixed seasonal plays and musicals. |

=== Mistieri "The Lost Continent" ===
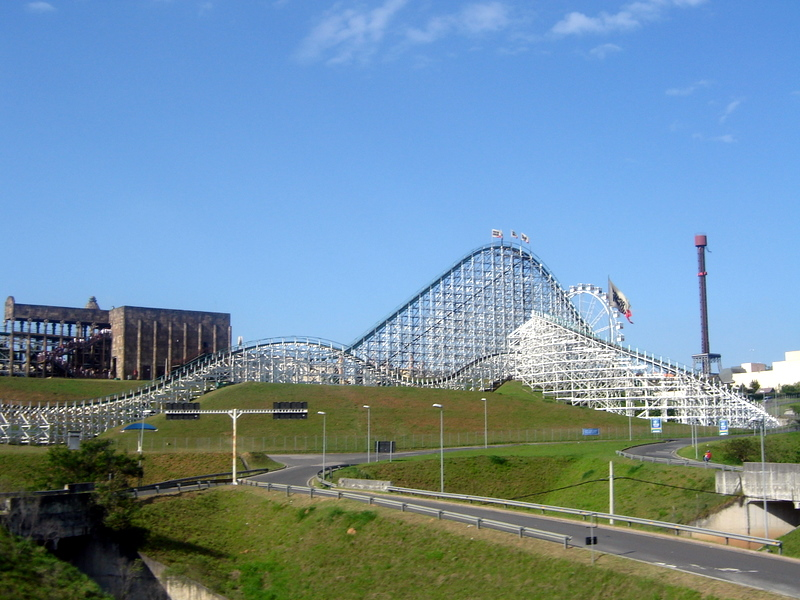
The Montezum's Helix

Mistieri (Mystery) is in the northwest of the park and occupies an area of 52,000 m^{2}. The themed area is based on ancient civilizations as Ancient Egyptians, Summerians, Mayas, Incas and Aztecs. In this region there is the top spin Ekatomb, an attraction that turns passengers upside down in several different ways, and Vulaviking, a boat that swings until it reaches about 90 degrees to the ground. This area of the park features two roller coasters: Montezum, a wooden roller coaster with 1030m. of length that reaches speeds of 103 km/h, and Vurang, another roller coaster inside a pyramid, where the cars turn around their own axis.

Mistieri's Attractions
| Ride | Rating | Year opened | Manufacturer | Status | Description |
|---|---|---|---|---|---|
| Ekatomb Annunaki | Radical | 1999 | Huss Rides | Operating | A classic Top Spin model themed as a Summerian ship, which leaves passengers upside down in various directions. |
| Katakumb | Familiar | 2003 | Indiana Mystery | Operating | A horror maze themed as the tomb of Ramesses II, which houses sarcophagi and mummies. |
| Montezum | Radical | 1999 | RCCA | Operating | An Aztec tribute wooden roller coaster where visitors sweep over 1030m in less than two minutes at a speed of up to 103 km/h (64 mph). It is the most popular attraction of the park |
| Simulákron | Familiar | 1999 | SimEX Iwerks | Operating | A simulator inside of an Inca temple with two rooms, each with a screen of 250 square meters. |
| Vulaviking | Familiar | 1999 | Huss Rides | Operating | A Viking boat that swings until an inclination of 90° to the ground. |
| Vurang | Radical | 1999 | Intamin | Operating | Also known as "Roller Coaster in the dark", it is a familiar spinning roller coaster inside in a pyramid, which runs most of its path entirely in the dark. |

=== Infantasia "Fantasyland" ===
Infantasia (Fantasyland) is in the central plain of the park and covers an area of 31,000 m^{2}. It is an area geared toward children, it had been themed around the Vila Sésamo and Looney Tunes characters. In this region the guest can find attractions such as Kastel di Lendas, where some Brazilian folk stories are told.

Infantasia's Attractions
| Ride | Rating | Year opened | Manufacturer | Status | Description |
|---|---|---|---|---|---|
| Astronavi | Children ride | 2011 | Zamperla | Operating | Little spaceships that turns and go up and down moving the stick. Formerly known as Konfront. |
| Bugabalum | Children ride | 1999; 2023 | Zamperla | Operating | Coloured little spaceships that turns and go up and down moving the stick. |
| Chabum | Children ride | 1999 | | Removed | Aquatic playground. |
| Dispenkito | Children ride | 1999 | | Operating | Two mini-free fall towers. A frog hopper model. |
| Giralata | Children ride | 1999 | Zamperla | Operating | Tea cups flat ride themed as paint cans. Formerly known as Lokolorê. |
| Giranda Pokotó | Children ride | 1999 | Fabricon | Operating | The famous and traditional Merry-go-round. Formerly known as Giranda di Musik. |
| Kastel di Lendas | Familiar | 1999 | Intamin | Operating | In a castle like "It's a Small World!", You enter one of 7 yellow boats that travel through a 250-meter-long water channel, passing animatronic dolls, representing the rich Brazilian folklore, each in their respective states (Amazonas, Bahia, Recife, Rio Grande do Sul, Rio de Janeiro and São Paulo) also has a final room illustrating countries. The boats have a capacity of 20 people each, totaling 140 people having fun at the same time. |
| Komboio | Children ride | 1999 | Zamperla | Operating | Little trucks (Convoy model) going through various scenarios. |
| Theatro Klapi Klapi | Familiar | 1999 | | Operating | A theater with capacity for 220 people, where children's plays are performed. |
| Toka do Uga | Children ride | 1999 | | Operating | Playground with pool balls, mazes, slides and tunnels of various sizes. It is themed with the new caracther Uga, from a pocket show "Dino, a True Dinosaur". Formerly known as Parkid and Trakitanas. |

Especial notes

- There is a song playing at theKastel di Lendas attraction, here is a short excerpt:

 "No Castelo das Lendas sabe o que é que tem?
  Alegria e muita diversão também!
  Vamos nessa magia é só navegar!
  O show, vai começar!"

=== Aribabiba "Living Life with Fun" ===
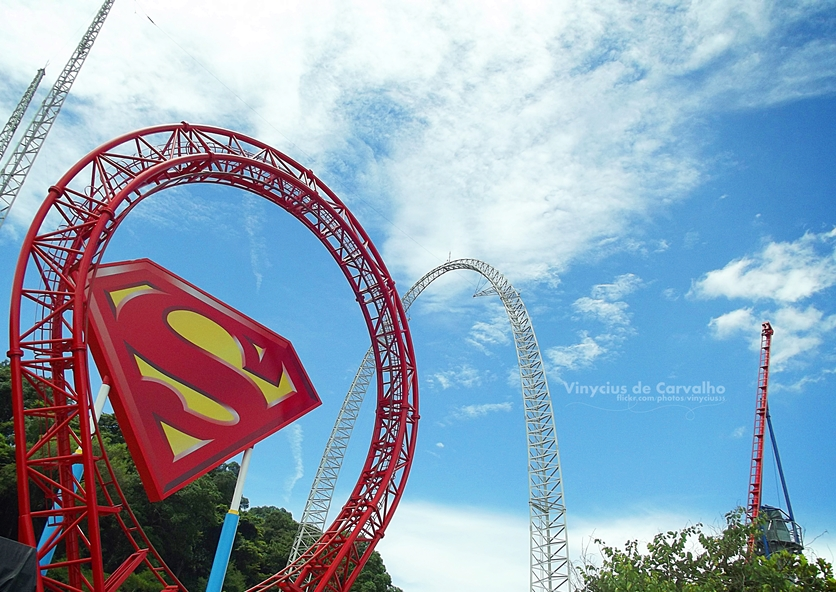
Katapul with Superman logo.

Aribabiba is the capital of the fictional country, and occupies an area of 16,000 m^{2}. Aribabiba means "living life with fun". It is located in the northwest, near Mistieri. In this region there are attractions like Hadikali (Skycoaster), Vambatê (bumper cars), among others. In November 2005 debuted "Chevrolet Mundi," but at the end of the contract with the automaker, the place that has restaurants changed its name to Gran Palaz Burger & Pasta, showing their lunches now owning the Aribabiba names of the attractions.

In 2011 to 2012, Aribabiba received the Justice League theme in a 10 years contract with Warner Bros and DC Comics. In 2019 Hopi Hari announces that they have not renewed the contract with Warner Bros. and with that the area would gain an unprecedented theme respecting the fictitious history of the park. The new theme has not yet been announced by the park.

Aribabiba's Attractions
| Ride | Rating | Year opened | Manufacturer | Status | Description |
|---|---|---|---|---|---|
| Aribabobbi | Familiar | 2023 | Zamperla | Operating | A Rockin' Tug ride. |
| Cinemotion | Familiar | 1999 | | Operating | A simulator where visitors live an adventure, which includes audio and special effects, a distance at high speed in a field where there is evidence of giant ramps, runways and challenges on all sides. All to provide the maximum sense of reality. |
| Hadikali | Radical | 2000 | Skycoaster | Operating | A dual tower Skycoaster. Here you can attain a speed of about 120 km/h at an altitude of 53 m, with a group of up to three people. |
| Hula hupi | Radical | 1999 | Fabbri | Removed | Gondolas turning to the music coming to let people upside down. Formerly known as Tokaia. |
| Jambalaia | Familiar | 1999 | Fabbri | Operating | Two crazy wagons that rock until they take a complete turn. Formerly known as Eléktron. |
| Jogos | Familiar | 1999 | | Removed | Area with carnival games and prizes (Paid separately). |
| Katapul | Radical | 1999 | Schwarzkopf | Operating | A Shuttle Loop. This ride utilizes a "weight drop" launch that sends riders a maximum speed of 53 miles per hour (85 km/h) into a vertical loop and up a 70 degree spike. Then the coaster will then complete the course backwards, back through the loop, into the station, up another 70 degree spike, and finally going back into the station to make a complete stop. |
| Parangolé | Familiar | 1999 | | Operating | Also known as "Flying Carousel". A big "umbrella" where people turn on chairs set in it. Formerly known as Trukes di Pinguim. |
| Speedi '64 | Children ride | 1999 | Zamperla | Operating | A powered roller coaster with a capacity of up to 20 people at a time. Formerly known as Billi Billi and as Bat Hatari. |
| Test-Drive | Familiar | 2005 | | Removed | Part of the partnership with Chevrolet, the attraction allowed visitors to pilot different models of the company's vehicles on a closed circuit. |
| Vambatê | Familiar | 1999 | | Operating | Traditional bumper cars. |

Especial notes

- Katapul used to operate at Alton Towers in England under the name Thunder Looper, and before that it ran at Kings Dominion and Jolly Roger Amusement Park as "King Kobra".

=== Wild West ===
"After a Hopi Hari citizen found gold in Rio Bravo, the news spread attracting North American immigrants." This is the basic story of this area strongly themed as an Old West Town. It has several attractions such as Rio Bravo, Evolution, Ghosti Hotel, as well as shows and other presentations daily.

Evolution, the cowboy's lasso.

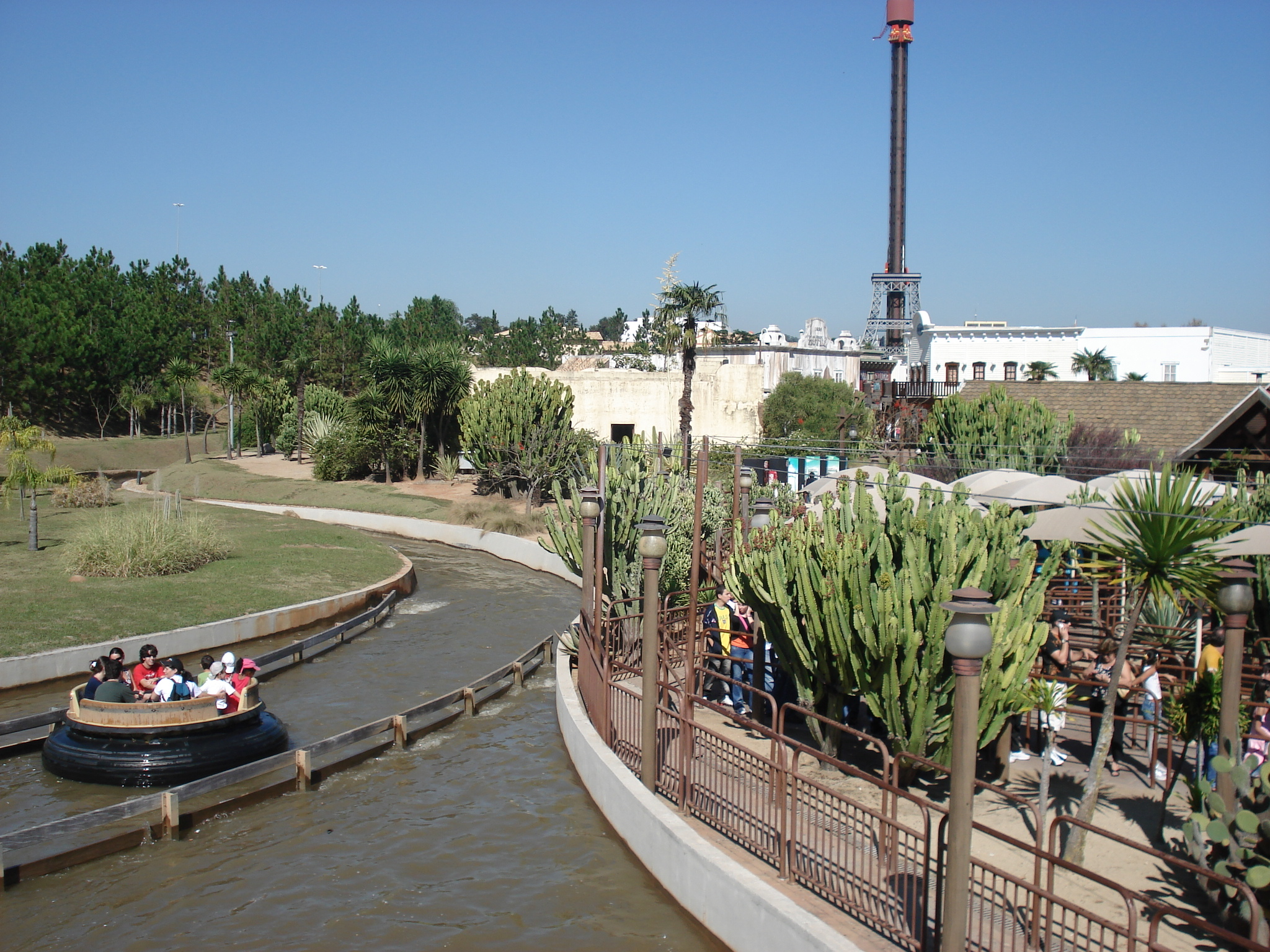
Rio Bravo

Wild West's Attractions
| Ride | Rating | Year opened | Manufacturer | Status | Description |
|---|---|---|---|---|---|
| Bravo Bull | Children ride | 1999 | | Operating | A mechanical bull ride. |
| Crazy Wagon | Familiar | 1999 | Huss Rides | Removed | A big wagon that rotates horizontally, like the Jambalaia, but much larger. His spins are given in clockwise and counterclockwise. A Rainbow model. |
| Evolution | Radical | 1999 | Fabbri | Operating | Ten gondolas stuck in a circle, supported by a large mechanical arm. This turns the circle and the gondolas at a constant speed at a height of approximately 20 m (roughly the same height as the Crazy Wagon), causing people to be upside down, and then descends back to its normal position. This appeal was withdrawn in 2004, and stored in warehouses of the park due to the numerous defects and high maintenance costs, however, been renovated and restored to service on August 21, 2010. |
| Ghosti Hotel | Familiar | 1999 | Gerstlauer | Operating | Hotel haunted. The tour is a wooden wagon that runs slowly all the frightening scenarios with sensory experiences as it passes through the reception, bar, bedrooms, bathrooms, gardens and basement. The trip takes about 3 minutes and 30 seconds. |
| La Mina Del Joe Sacramento | Familiar | 1999 | | Operating | The visitors make a journey on foot inside an abandoned mine, where they encounter monsters, an elevator that goes down, among others. |
| Namuskita | Familiar | 1999 | | Operating | Shooting game. (Paid separately) |
| Rio Bravo | Familiar | 1999 | Intamin | Operating | One of the most successful attractions in the region. Simulates a raft in a river about 600 meters long, with rapids and waterfalls. The course is conducted by means of circular rafts with a capacity of nine people. If you go back, you get wet some more. |
| Saloon Show | Familiar | 1999 | | Operating | Restaurant themed as a Wild West saloon, with typical dishes of the day, and several shows during the day. |
| Spleshi | Familiar | 1999 | | Operating | This is a water ride following the Log Flume model, which has a boat-shaped trunk that can carry up to 4 people. The ride rises, and then go through a steep decline, falling back into the water. The impact of the boat with water causes people to be very wet. In 2008, this attraction was renovated. Formerly known as Kidspleshi. |
| Tirolesa | Radical | 2002 | | Operating | A zip-line 200 meters long crossing from Wild West to Aribabiba over the lake. (Paid separately) |
| Vamvolari | Familiar | 2023 | Zamperla | Operating | A Kite Flyer ride. |

== Former attractions ==
- Unicirco: Circo of Marcos Frota, who presented a show called GIRO. Taken from the park in 2009. It was located in the region of Infantasia.
- Chevrolet Mundi: Complex where restaurants were located, a motion simulator about Chevrolet brand cars and where it is possible to test drive. In 2011, the Chevrolet did not renew the contract with the park. Currently, the restaurant is called Gran Palaz Burger & Pasta, the simulator displays the same Simulákron films, and the location of the Test Drive is abandoned.
- Komunikatron: 3D and 4D Simulator telling the story of the phone. Besides, there was also a giant phone. It was off by building the space Hopi Niver. He stayed five years in the park.
- Mining: Located in the Wild West, this attraction for children consisted of a water wheel where they mined gravel. Who more mines, won prizes.
- Aquabum: Aquatic version of the bumper cars, located on Lake of Hopi Hari. It was opened in 2002 and closed a few years later.
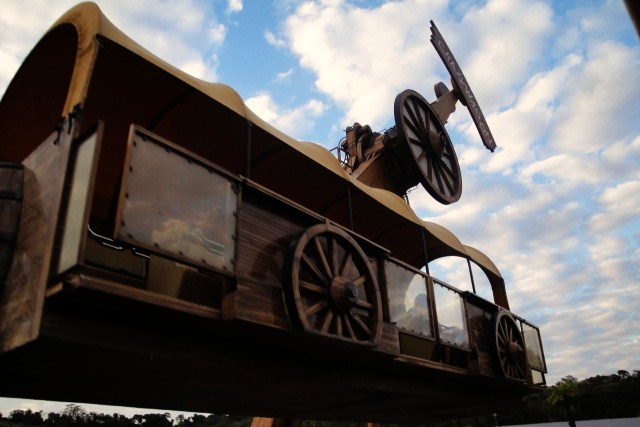
  Crazy Wagon
- Wylli Mundi: It was a playground for a giant baby that entertained and taught children about the importance of health care. Off in 2011 in line with the reforms of Infantasia.
- Crazy Wagon: A big wagon that rotates horizontally, like the Jambalaia, but much larger. The spins are given in clockwise and counterclockwise. It was built by the German factory HUSS Rides which calls those types of rides like "Rainbow".
- Unknown: Popularly known as "10i", the newer version of the Intamin 10-inversion roller coaster that costed $21 million. This ride uses a cable lift hill that reaches 20 km/h, and directly goes into a curved drop. Its maximum speed is 85 km/h. Never constructed due to the park's financial issues, it remained in storage until sold, and has since been relocated to Flamingo Land in England, where it opened as Sik.
- Tokaia: Gondolas turning to the music and themed with Cat Woman vs. Wonder Woman, coming to let people upside down. One model in the world, the Fabbri Fly Wind model. Currently standing but not operating.

== Events ==
Throughout the year, Hopi Hari has several seasonal and occasional events:

=== Summer at Hopi Hari (Hopi Verani) ===
“Summer at Hopi Hari” takes place from January to March and the season features parades, characters and many live shows. Some editions had themes and Kaminda Mundi usually is the central area of the event.

==== The themes of the Summer at Hopi Hari ====
- 2010: Alice at Hopi Hari
- 2011: Alice comeback to Hopi Hari
- 2012: Looney Tunes at Hopi Hari

=== Hopi Night ===
Hopi Night is the main second season event that takes place from April to June and brings to Hopi Hari a festival of electronic music with many special effects, fireworks, performances and dancers. Each year is chosen a different theme for the event.

==== The themes of Hopi Night ====
- 2009: The Mystery of the Pyramid
- 2010: Vampires and Werewolves
- 2011: Eléktron
- 2012: Alien Experience
- 2014: Connect
- 2015: Are You Ready?
- 2016: 360°
- 2018: Elements
- 2019: Alunagem
- 2022: Atlantis
- 2023: Hollywood

=== Magical Vacations (Férias Spetakuláris) ===
Magical Vacations, as the "Summer at Hopi Hari", is a season event focused on families with different theme each year. The season Magical Vacations takes place from June to August and features parades, characters, musical performances, daily shows and fireworks.

==== The themes of Magical Vacations ====
- 2008: Fun Street Night
- 2009: A Thousand and One Days in Hopi Hari
- 2010: Pirates of Neverland
- 2011: The Magic of Dinosaurs
- 2012: The Looney Tunes Show
- 2018: Wild West - Amazing
- 2019: Around the World
- 2021: Alice Back to the Funniest Country in the World
- 2022: Oz - A Journey to the Magical Realm

=== Horror Time (Hora do Horror) ===
Considered the main season of the park, the Horror Time is the halloween event held in August to November at Hopi Hari. The event that explore new horror themes every year features characters usually wandering around at Mistieri, Aribabiba and Wild West, besides performances, live shows, fireworks, special effects. The event starts from 6 pm and liberates access to the special horror themed mazes.

==== The themes of the Horror Time ====
- 2002: Fear Has Never Been So Real
- 2003: Fear is Back
- 2004: Fear has time
- 2005: The 4 Elements
- 2006: Under the Dominion of Shadows
- 2007: Nightmares
- 2008: 7 Games of Fear
- 2009: Circus of Horrors
- 2010: The Wax Museum
- 2011: Epidemic
- 2012: Black Moon
- 2013: Once upon a time - Fables of Evil
- 2014: The Toys Store
- 2015: The City of the Forgotten
- 2016: Horror Gran Hotel
- 2017: Karnak - The Tomb's Curse
- 2018: Sacrificium
- 2019: Apocalypse
- 2020: Horror Drive Tour and Dark Christmas
- 2021: Déjàvu
- 2022: Alcatraz - Rebellion of Souls
- 2023: Tenebris - The Gods' Revenge

=== Hopi Pride ===
It is the major punctual event that happens in November focused for the LGBT community. Since 2022, the event has a summer edition that happens in February.

=== Magic Christmas (Natal Magiko) ===
The main last season event of Hopi Hari takes place from November to January. Based on Christmas theme, this season attracts families to the park to attend parades and shows.

== Shopping and food ==
There are a number of shops throughout the park, the majority being at the end of each ride.

For food, one can travel to the numerous sandwich shops located throughout the park. For a more interesting eating experience, there are several small restaurants in the park, generally with a different food theme based in the park history.

- Doce Mundi: a candy shop.
- Dog do Hópiu: a hot dog food stall.
- Euro Restaurandi: one of the most important restaurant at the park, themed as a bistro with gourmet dishes.
- Hango do Guido: a fast food restaurant.
- Hopi Dog: a hot dog food stall.
- Hopi Grill
- Hopi Hango: a fast food restaurant.
- Hopi Vegani: a vegan fast food restaurant.
- Kafé di Palaz: the biggest fast food restaurant at the park and offers some arcade games.
- Kitutis da Hópia
- Place de la Glace: an ice cream restaurant.
- Pizzaria do Chefinho Hari: a pizza restaurant.
- Rango Django
- Saloon: one of the most important restaurant at the park, themed as a wild west saloon with shows and typical dishes.
- Spleshi Snacks

== Hopês (Hoplish - Hopi Hari's language) ==
As an imaginary country, Hopi Hari has also its own language, called hopês ("Hoplish"). It is a humorous, often childish language mostly based on Portuguese with lexical influence from other languages, chiefly Papiamento, Bororo, Portuguese, English, Italian and German. Signs throughout the park are printed in both hopês and Portuguese and there are several places in the park where one can buy the Michaelis "Hoplish-Portuguese Dictionary" (Dicionário Hopês-Português).

Some examples of expressions in the language include:

- Tchauí – "goodbye" (from tchau)
- Danki – "thank you"
- Oiê – "hey, hello" (from oi)
- Kuanto ki tikitaki? – "what time is it?" (from quanto que + tick tack)
- Vendinovu – "come again" (from vem de novo)
- Click click – "picture; photograph" (onomatopoeic)
- Mi ké hangá! – "I'm hungry"
- Bon bini – "welcome"
- Tivi la – "I've been there" (from estive lá)

== Controversies ==
On 28 September 2007, Arthur Wolf, a 15-year-old student, suffered an anaphylaxis attack while in one of the Hora do Horror' tunnels. Despite being revived after a CRA by the medical team of the park, he died hours later in the hospital.

On 24 February 2012, 14-year-old Gabriella Nichimura died after falling off one of the chairs of the La Tour Eiffel. The girl fell from a height of 20 meters because she was in a seat which couldn't be utilized and was inactive for many years. Overall, eleven people, including the president of the park were indicted by the Civil Police of São Paulo by culpable homicide. The park was closed for 23 days by the Brazilian Public Ministry for investigations and had to make improvements on the safety of all rides and to reduce the working hours of the employees.

On the afternoon of 24 September 2014, a group of about 50 youngsters, who paid for their tickets, started a flash rob in the interior of the park, causing havoc and leaving six visitors hurt. Dozens of reports of people having their belongings stolen were left on the park's visitor answering service.

On 11 December 2021, a latch on the Montezum roller coaster came loose with the attraction in motion. The operators triggered the technical stop in time and there were no injuries.
