= Death of Gabriela Yukari Nichimura =

2012 amusement park death

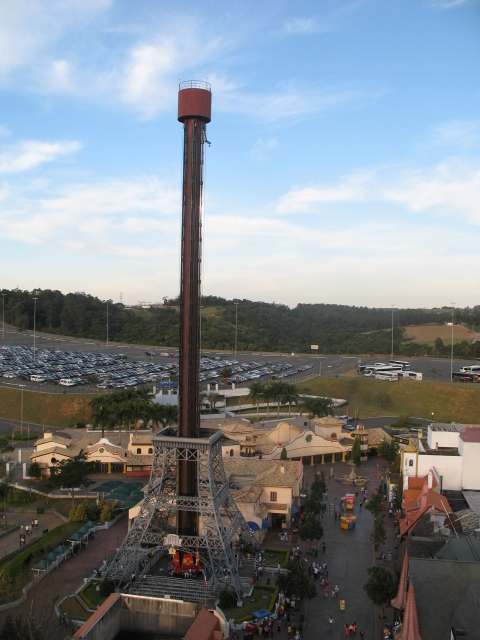
- La Tour Eiffel as pictured in 2007
- Date: 24 February 2012
- Time: ~10:20 am (UTC−02:00)
- Location: La Tour Eiffel, Hopi Hari, Vinhedo, São Paulo, Brazil; 23.0982°S 47.0084°W
- Type: Amusement ride accident
- Cause: Chair lock failure at approx. 20 meters (66 feet) in the air
- Outcome: 14-year-old girl falling out of her seat to her death; Park closed for one month; Attraction left standing but not operating since accident
- Deaths: 1
- Injuries: 0
- Arrests: 8
- Convictions: Three employees convicted of manslaughter; five other employees acquitted
- Sentence: Three employees: 32 months of community service

On 24 February 2012, 14-year-old Gabriela Yukari Nichimura died after falling from the La Tour Eiffel drop tower at the Hopi Hari amusement park in Vinhedo, São Paulo, Brazil.

== Incident ==
Nichimura's chair lock opened at about 66 feet (20 meters) in the air. The chair had been unused for 10 years, due to the seat's location where a person could bump into the metal frame of the drop tower. Therefore it was excluded for additional seat belt installation, and the old chair lock could no longer stay locked by itself; it had been opened before or during rides. But there had not been any sign informing not to use, and the park's authorities dismissed workers' warning.

== La Tour Eiffel ==
Clarification note

Hopi Hari reports that around 10:20 am today there was an accident involving a 14-year-old visitor who was in the La Tour Eiffel tower. The visitor was rescued and taken to Paulo Sacramento Hospital in the city of Jundiaí, where she died. After the accident, the park decided to end its activities for the day. Hopi Hari reopens tomorrow, Saturday, from 10 am to 7 pm. La Tour Eiffel will remain closed until the causes of the accident are clarified. The review of the ride is carried out by the Technical Police, which will investigate the hypotheses of the accident. The park deeply regrets what happened, [and] is providing all assistance to the victim's family and supporting the bodies responsible for investigating the causes of the accident.

— Hopi Hari, Facebook post from the day of the accident

The drop tower initially opened, along with the park itself, on 30 November 1999. The tower allows participants enter into free fall from a height of 69.5 meters, or 228 feet (the equivalent of a 23-story building) at a speed of approximately 94 km/h (58.41 mph).

== Aftermath and investigation ==
The park closed hours after the accident. A full review of all rides began on 2 March of that year. Upon completion of the review and the signing of a Conduct Adjustment Term (CAT), the park was reopened on 25 March 2012, but the tower remained closed.

At the time, Nichimura's family planned to sue the park for material and emotional damage, and asked for R$ 4 million in compensation from Hopi Hari and R$ 1 million from Vinhedo City Hall.

On 9 May 2012, the Public Prosecution Service indicted 12 people for the accident, including then-president of the park Armando Pereira Filho. The park attempted to reach a deal with the family.

In 2017, three employees were convicted of manslaughter, and sentenced to two years and eight months of community service and the payment of a minimum wage for a social entity. Another five employees were acquitted. The family and the park came to an undisclosed agreement.

On 18 May 2017, the Supreme Federal Court discontinued a lawsuit against former park President Armando Pereira Filho. The family received therapy in the aftermath of the incident.

== Canceled reopening ==
After changes in the drop tower, it was estimated to reopen in August 2019, but in June 2019, the management decided against it, due to the need for US$480,000 to recover the equipment and the realization of marketing.

In 2026, the drop tower was demolished.

== Notes ==
1. Hours in UTC-2 (Daylight saving time).
