= Marauder (comics) =

Marauder, in comics, may refer to:

- Marauder (2000 AD), a 2000 AD character and series written by Robbie Morrison
- Marauder (DC Comics), a DC Comics character and enemy of Aquaman
- Marauder (DC Comics), a DC Comics character from Earth-1
- Marauder (Marvel Comics), an enemy of Iron Man
- Marauders (comics), a Marvel Comics supervillain team
- Marauders (comic book), a Marvel Comics comic book launched in 2019

== See also ==
- Marauder (disambiguation)
