= Steaming (crime) =

Robbery performed by large group

In British slang, steaming is a robbery performed on train or bus passengers by a gang or large group and often involving some level of violence. Several cases have been reported on the London Underground and other city public transport systems although not exclusively localised to them. It may also be applied to other theft such as shoplifting, involving a large group employing distraction tactics, intimidation or actual violence against staff. In general, the term refers to the operation in a large group and the use of intimidation and violence to commit theft.

== See also ==
- Flash rob
