= Son of Beast =

Defunct wooden roller coaster

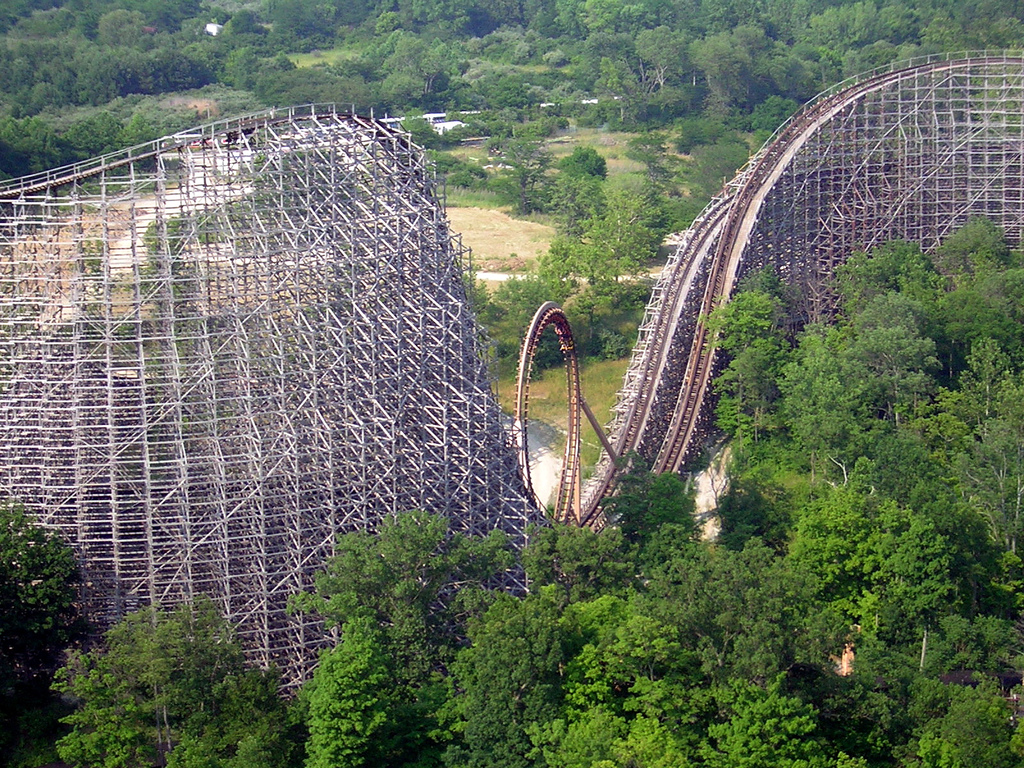
- Son of Beast's track layout with the loop, 2005

Kings Island
- Location: Kings Island
- Park section: Action Zone
- Coordinates: 39.346101°N 84.264686°W
- Status: Removed
- Opening date: April 28, 2000
- Closing date: June 16, 2009
- Cost: $20.5 million
- Replaced by: Banshee

General statistics
- Type: Wood
- Manufacturer: Roller Coaster Corporation of America
- Designer: Werner Stengel
- Track layout: Terrain roller coaster
- Lift/launch system: Chain lift hill
- Height: 218 ft (66 m)
- Drop: 214 ft (65 m)
- Length: 7,032 ft (2,143 m)
- Speed: 78.4 mph (126.2 km/h)
- Inversions: 1 (2000–2006); 0 (2007–2009)
- Duration: 2:20
- Max vertical angle: 55.7°
- Capacity: 1600 riders per hour
- G-force: 4.5
- Trains: 2 trains with 6 cars; riders arranged 2 across in 2 rows for a total of 24 riders per train
- Son of Beast at RCDB

Son of Beast was a wooden roller coaster located at Kings Island in Mason, Ohio, United States. Built and designed by the now-defunct Roller Coaster Corporation of America (RCCA), the ride opened as the tallest and fastest wooden coaster in the world on April 28, 2000. Its record-setting height of 218 feet (66 m) made it the first wooden hypercoaster – a height class of 200 feet (61 m) or more. It was also the first wooden coaster in the modern era to feature a vertical loop and reached a record-breaking maximum speed of 78 mph (126 km/h). Son of Beast was marketed and themed as a sequel to The Beast roller coaster, one of the park's signature attractions that was built in 1979.

Son of Beast met an early demise following two non-fatal but serious incidents, with the first occurring in 2006 and the second occurring in 2009. There were also issues with the ride's construction affecting its reliability and longevity. After sitting idle for three years, the roller coaster was eventually demolished in 2012. A new steel coaster, Banshee, was built in its place and opened in 2014. The height and speed records once held by Son of Beast remain unbroken.

== History ==
The Roller Coaster Corporation of America (RCCA) discussed the idea of building the world's first wooden hypercoaster with Kings Island in 1997. On May 11, 1999, the park held a public event within the park near a large, covered crate placed along a footpath. Beastly growling and snarling noises came from inside as it shook violently on occasion. Montel Williams, acting as Director of Thrills, announced that a record-breaking wooden coaster named Son of Beast would open for the 2000 season. During the announcement, the tarp covering was removed, revealing a chained crate with holes throughout its framework. A scale model of the roller coaster was displayed to the audience, as well as a list of seven world records that would be set by the new coaster.

=== Construction ===
The Roller Coaster Company of Ohio was officially recorded as the ride's designer, an affiliate and shell company of RCCA. The primary structural engineer was Wooden Structures Inc. of Georgia, while the lumber was manufactured by Universal Forest Products of Hamilton, Ohio. Problems plagued the ride from the beginning, and Paramount Parks – who owned and operated Kings Island at the time – made the decision to fire RCCA before construction was complete.

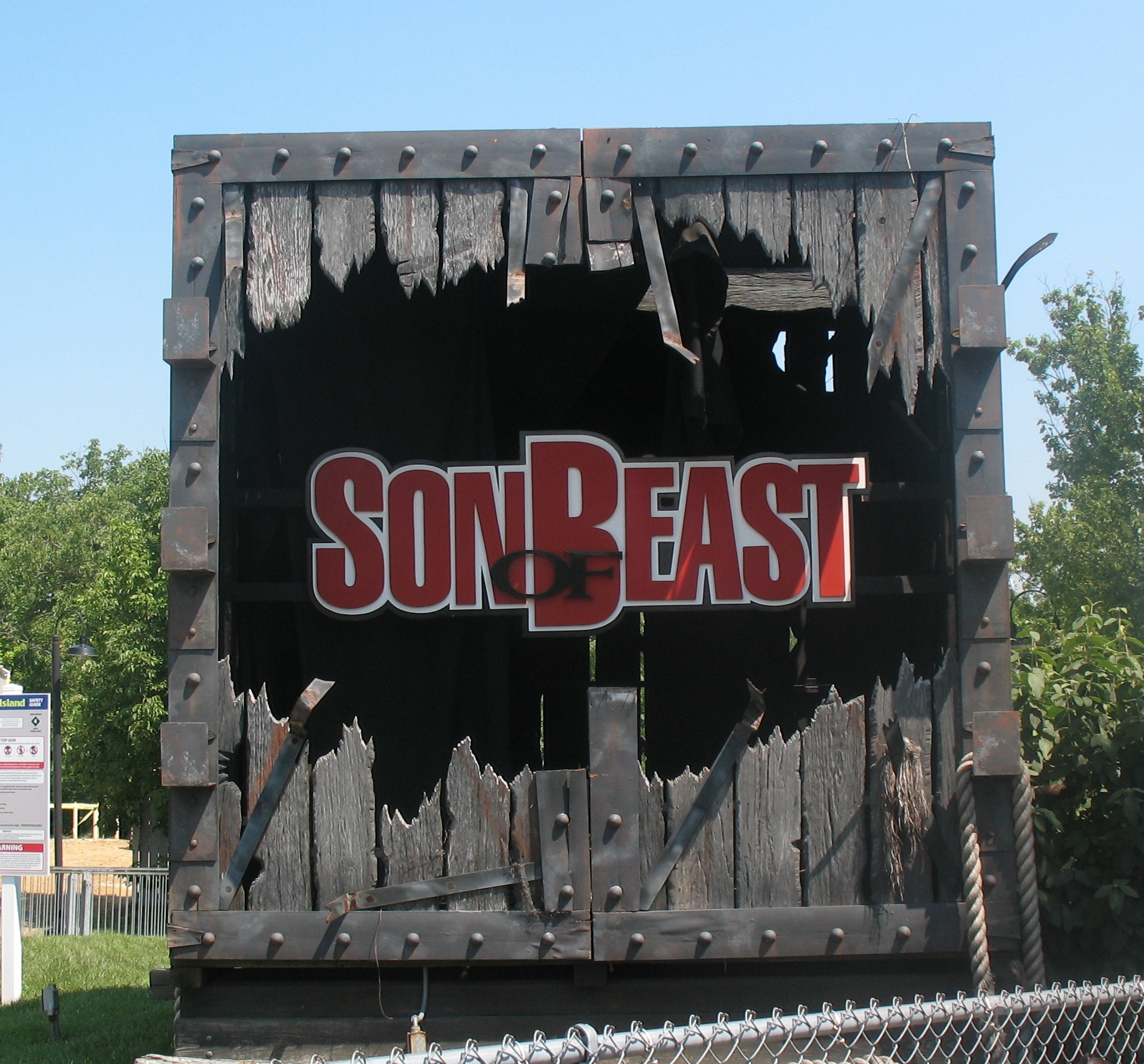
The broken crate signage at the ride's entrance

On January 11, 2000, a portion of the ride was damaged due to a strong gust of wind. It was later revealed that the second hill had collapsed by itself. The wooden structure was being held in place by a temporary ribbon support system and had been constructed only a day earlier. The ride was planned to open on April 14, 2000, but construction was halted due to rainy weather. As a result, the coaster's opening had to be delayed. In addition, the Occupational Safety and Health Administration fined Paramount $110,000 in February 2000 after discovering 18 safety violations during two inspections, including 11 that were deemed "serious".

=== Operation ===
Son of Beast officially opened to the public on April 28, 2000. The sign at the ride's entrance featured a large wooden crate covered with chains, rope, and metal straps, resembling the one on display during the public reveal in 1999. The front was ripped open with the name "Son of Beast" centered on the inside.

The day after the ride opened, officials discovered defects in a 15-foot-long (4.6 m) section of track. Son of Beast closed soon afterward, undergoing three weeks of repairs. It reopened on May 26, 2000, although heavy rains delayed the reopening by nearly six hours. The park ultimately had to make several design corrections during Son of Beast's inaugural year. Kings Island filed a lawsuit in November 2000 against the three companies involved in the design and manufacture of the roller coaster, claiming defects that delayed the initial opening and resulted in multiple closures. In 2005, a federal court ruled that the Roller Coaster Company of Ohio's insurer, Admiral Insurance, had to pay Kings Island $20 million in damages in relation to the lawsuit. However, the ruling was overturned by an appeals court in 2008.

The ride experienced its first major incident on July 9, 2006, during which a train passed over a structural track failure that severely jolted riders. Son of Beast closed for the remainder of the 2006 season while repairs were made, and Kings Island decided to replace the original trains with lighter models. The three original trains were designed by Premier Rides, each consisting of six cars for a total capacity of 36. Kings Island purchased two Gerstlauer-designed trains from the demolished Hurricane: Category 5 coaster at the Myrtle Beach Pavilion to serve as lighter replacements. The lighter trains were shorter, each consisting of six cars that held 24 riders, and were used to reduce the overall load on the wooden structure.

To help the lighter trains complete the circuit, the loop was removed in January 2007 and recycled for scrap. The park claimed that the changes helped make the ride more comfortable, and Son of Beast eventually reopened on July 4, 2007. Despite the loss of the vertical loop, the coaster continued to hold the record as tallest and fastest wooden roller coaster in the world.

=== Closure and demolition ===
Another major incident occurred in May 2009 involving a non-contact head injury, and Kings Island voluntarily closed the ride two weeks later on June 16 upon hearing feedback from the injured rider. The coaster did not reopen for the 2009 season. Kings Island officials received three proposals to repair Son of Beast, one of which they rejected outright. References to Son of Beast were removed from the park's website and map in early 2010. All signage, including the box at the entrance, was also removed. At the time, the ride had accommodated an estimated 7 million guests throughout its history.

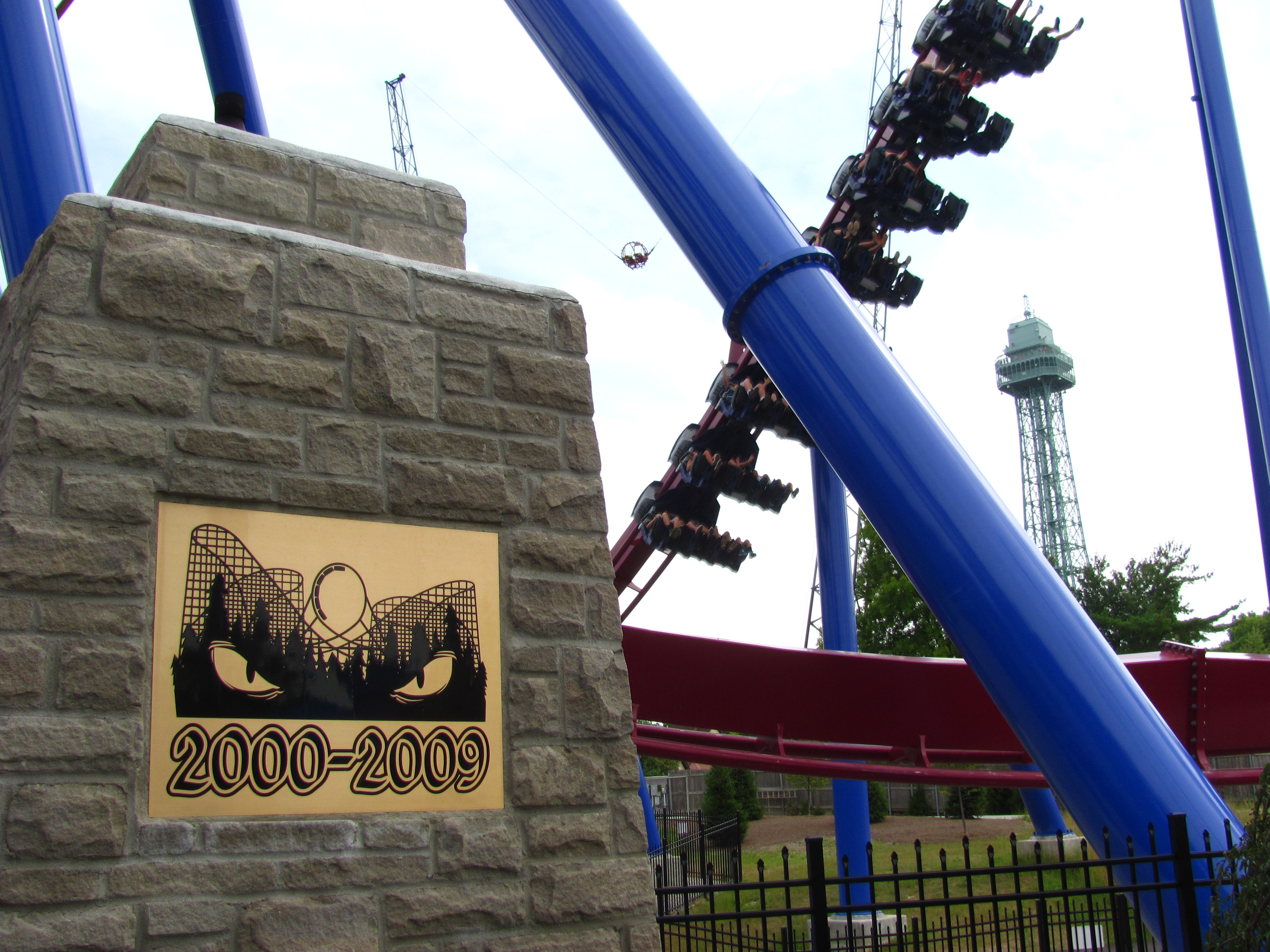
The tombstone decoration in Banshee's line queue

In March 2010, Kings Island's general manager, Greg Scheid, stated that the park had spent nearly $30 million on the ride to date and that it would not reopen for the 2010 season. Another Kings Island spokesperson, Don Helbig, announced the following year that the ride would again be closed for the 2011 season, adding, "No decision has been made concerning the ride's future. It would be inappropriate to speculate on when a decision might be made. There's nothing else to talk about." The coaster remained closed at the beginning of the 2012 season.

By late July 2012, following a thorough evaluation of the roller coaster, Kings Island announced that Son of Beast would be removed from the park to make room for future expansion. Demolition began that following September. During the demolition of Son of Beast, Kings Island sold plaques with a piece of the ride's track for $99.99. Park officials offered pieces of the wood structure for $49.99 and structural bolts for $24.99. On November 20, 2012, one of the last remaining parts of the structure, the lift hill, was demolished.

A new roller coaster called Banshee, which opened in April 2014, was constructed in its place. A tombstone with a plaque honoring Son of Beast was placed in a mockup graveyard near Banshee's line queue entrance.

During Son of Beast's closure, its station was used for a haunted house attraction called Wolf Pack beginning in 2010. Even after the ride's demolition, the station was left behind and continued to be used for Wolf Pack until the attraction was retired in 2019.

In 2018, Kings Island released posters that referenced Son of Beast's station, Outpost 5, leading some to speculate that a possible revival might be announced by the park. However, the rumors were never confirmed.

== Layout ==
After loading the train, riders left the station making a 51-foot (16 m) left-hand drop into a series of short hops before turning into the 218-foot-tall (66 m) lift hill. At the crest of the lift hill, the track made a left-hand turn over to the first drop, where it dropped 214 feet (65 m) to the ground followed by a 70-degree banked turn to the right. Riders then descended 164 feet (50 m) down a second drop into a left-hand double helix. Coming out of the helix, the train passed through a mid-course brake run dropping into a straight section of track (where the vertical loop was prior to its removal after the 2006 season), before entering a right-hand double helix nestled into the structure of the lift hill and the turn to the first drop. After leaving the helix, trains crossed over a smaller hill, then made a three quarter right hand turn before diving under the previous drop and rising up into the final brake run. One cycle of the ride lasted about 2 minutes and 20 seconds.

The superstructure of the roller coaster used yellow pine, while the track piles were made of Douglas fir. Son of Beast was supported by 2,414 footers, which extended 11 feet (3.4 m) into the ground. In addition, 225,000 21-inch (530 mm) steel bolts and over 22 short tons (20,000 kg) of nails were used to secure the roller coaster's superstructure. Before the loop was removed in December 2006, it had a steel structure and a wooden track. About 2,500,000 board feet (5,900 m^{3}) of timber were used in Son of Beast's construction, and the ride itself covered 12 acres (4.9 ha).

== World records ==
At the time of its introduction in 2000, Son of Beast was the only wooden roller coaster nationally ranked in the top 10 for track height, track length, drop height, and speed. It set several world records becoming the tallest and fastest wooden roller coaster in the world, as well as becoming the second longest following its predecessor, The Beast. In addition, when it opened, Son of Beast was the only wooden roller coaster to feature a vertical loop. The loop was removed prior to the 2007 season. Its records for height, speed, and drop length remain unbroken. (Note: As of 2022, the current height, drop distance, and speed records are as follows: Height: Wildfire/T Express – both 183.8 ft (56.0 m); Drop distance: Goliath – 180 ft (55 m); Speed: Goliath – 72 miles per hour (116 km/h); The corresponding statistics for Son of Beast were: Height: 218 feet (66 m); Drop distance: 214 feet (65 m); Speed: 78 miles per hour (126 km/h))

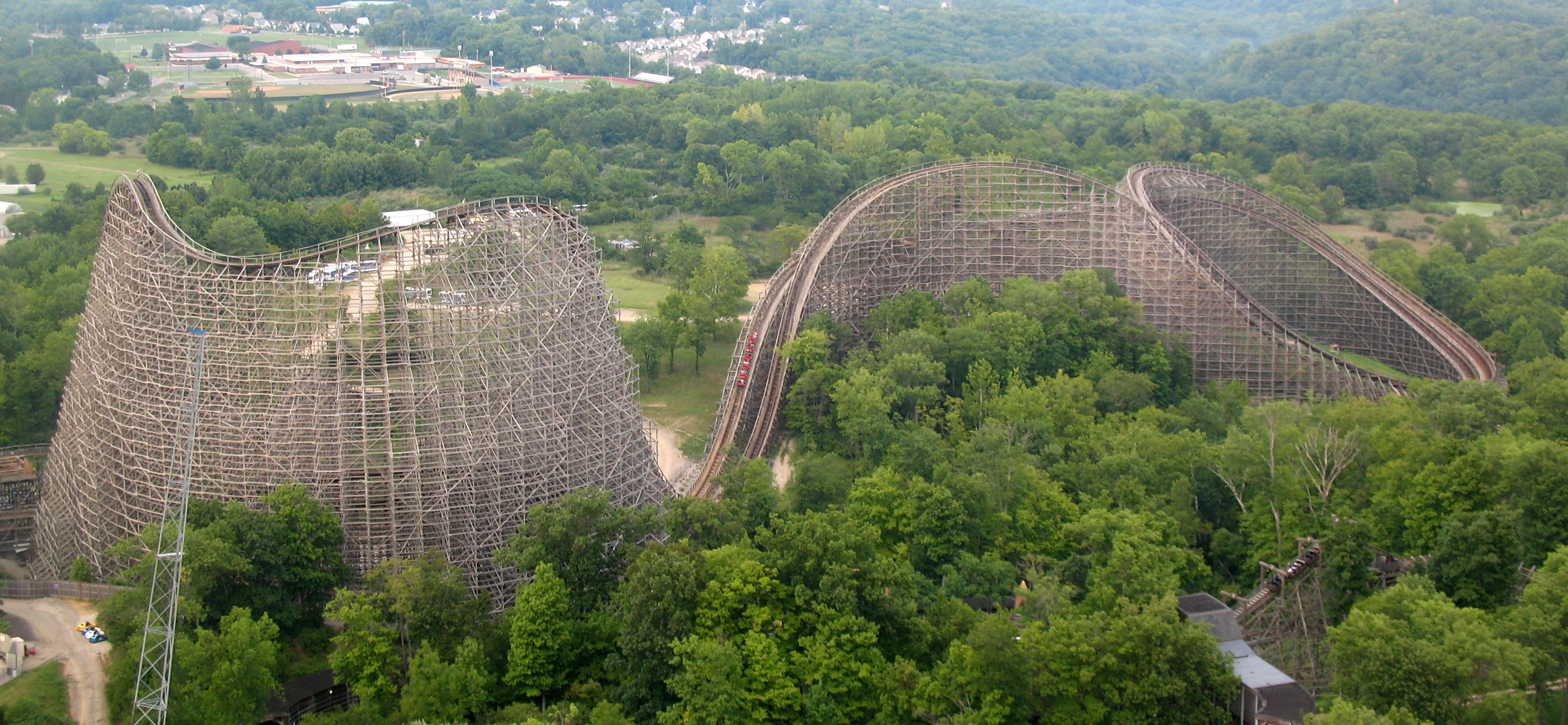
Son of Beast's track layout in 2007, after the loop was removed

The seven world records held at its introduction were:

1. Tallest wooden roller coaster
2. Longest wooden roller coaster drop
3. Fastest wooden roller coaster
4. Only looping wooden roller coaster (2000–2006)
5. Longest looping roller coaster (2000–2006)
6. Most wooden coaster track at one park (22,612 feet or 6,892 meters)
7. First and only wooden hypercoaster in the world (over 200 feet or 61 meters high)

== Incidents ==
From 2000 to 2009, the Ohio Department of Agriculture (ODA) recorded six incidents of injuries to guests riding Son of Beast, which was more than any other ride in Ohio during that time period. Only one of the six incidents, a 2006 derailment that injured 27 riders, was linked directly to structural issues with the ride itself. The other five were isolated incidents involving five individuals.

In two separate occurrences within a four-week period in 2001, a guest broke their neck while riding. Both had a preexisting medical condition called ankylosing spondylitis, a rare form of arthritis in the spine that can make spinal fractures more likely to occur. A third rider fractured vertebrae in 2003, and ODA officials were unable to determine if the injury was related to a preexisting medical condition. A fourth rider reported back pain after riding Son of Beast in 2007 and died one day later. A serious head injury to a fifth rider in 2009, involving a burst blood vessel, ultimately led to the ride's permanent closure.

=== Derailment in 2006 ===
On the evening of July 9, 2006, a structural failure in the "Rose Bowl" section of the ride formed a "slight dip" in the track, resulting in a "pothole effect". Riders were severely jolted when a coaster train passed over the damaged area. The next train, still ascending the lift hill, was halted immediately after riders returning to the station reported the issue. A total of 27 riders were sent to the hospital, with many suffering head and neck injuries, and all but two were released the same day. None of the injuries were life-threatening. An inspection the following day determined the accident was caused by cracked or split wood along the track layout. Son of Beast was shut down for an extended period of time pending repairs and a full investigation by the State of Ohio. The state asked for extensive testing before the ride could reopen, which it eventually did for the 2007 season.

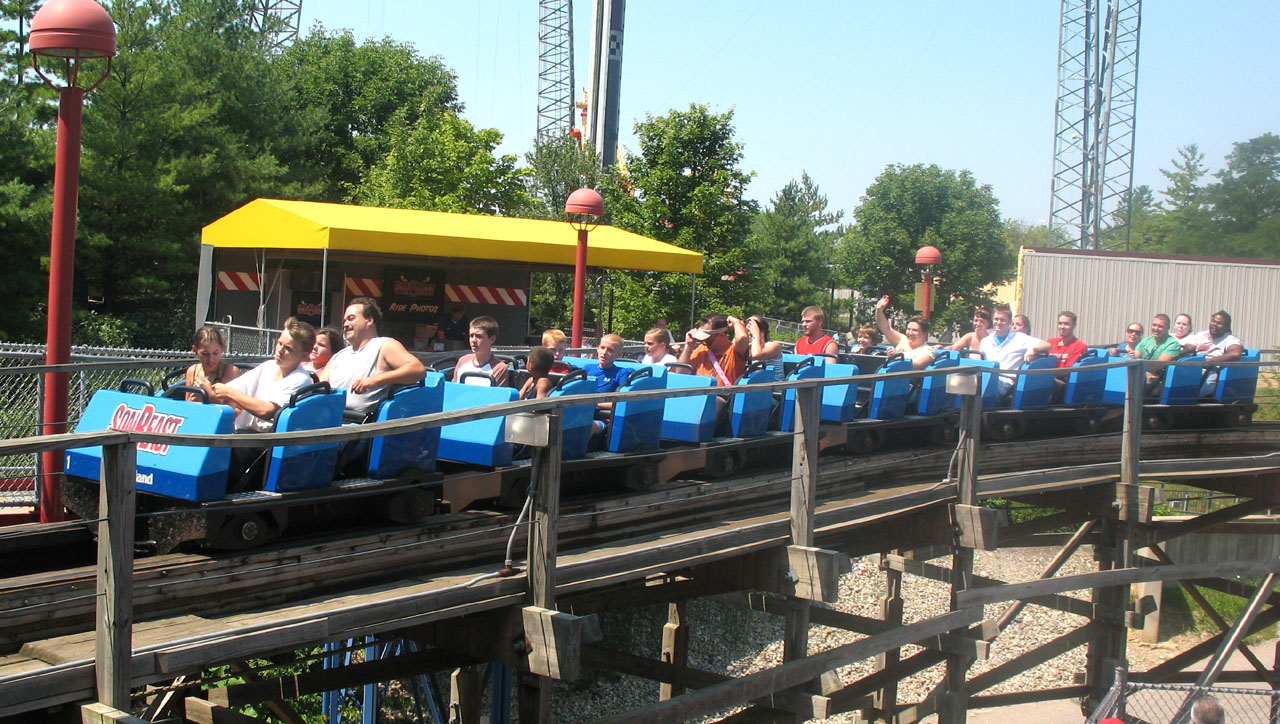
One of Son of Beast's Gerstlauer trains (2007–2009)

Following the 2006 incident, the park opted to replace the original trains with lighter models before reopening the ride. The vertical loop was also removed during this time. The injured riders filed five lawsuits, four of which were settled out of court. The fifth lawsuit resulted in a ruling that required Kings Island to pay over $76,000 in compensatory damages. Forensic investigator Rick Schmizze testified that Kings Island had known since 2000 that the ride had major issues with swaying, but that park officials had not done enough to fix the problem. Kings Island settled the last lawsuit in 2011.

=== Final incident in 2009 ===
On June 16, 2009, a woman reported suffering a head injury while riding Son of Beast during her visit to the park on May 31, 2009. She did not initially report the incident to Kings Island officials. The injury involved a burst blood vessel in her brain, and she required admission to an intensive care unit at a nearby hospital. According to the park's public relations manager, Don Helbig, "The first we heard of this was on June 16. Her visit was on May 31, and there's no record of going to first aid for anything here at the park." Helbig also noted there were no other reports of injuries on the ride that season. Son of Beast was shut down as a precaution, however, during the investigation. Regarding the reopening of the ride, Helbig stated, "At this point, it would be inappropriate to speculate on an exact date when the ride may reopen. We're going to do a thorough maintenance review. We're going to work with the state of Ohio on that."

A summary of the investigation was released on July 29, 2009, and it determined there were no irregularities found with the ride. The roller coaster remained closed following the report, and in 2012, the park revealed its decision to permanently close and dismantle Son of Beast.

== Rankings ==
Golden Ticket Awards: Top wood Roller Coasters
Year									1998	1999
Ranking									–	–
Year	2000	2001	2002	2003	2004	2005	2006	2007	2008	2009
Ranking	–	46	38	37 (tie)	36 (tie)	31	48	–	–	–
Year	2010	2011	2012	2013	2014	2015	2016	2017	2018	2019
Ranking	–	–	–	–	–	–	–	–	–	–
Year	2020	2021	2022	2023	2024	2025	2026			
Ranking	N/A	–	–	–	–	–	–			

== See also ==
- List of former Kings Island attractions
- The Beast (roller coaster)

== Notes ==
Preceded by Rattler	World's Tallest Wooden Roller Coaster; April 28, 2000 – November 20, 2012	Succeeded by T Express; Wildfire
Preceded by American Eagle	World's Fastest Wooden Roller Coaster; April 28, 2000 – November 20, 2012	Succeeded by El Toro
