= Marauder =

Marauder, marauders, The Marauder, or The Marauders may refer to:

- A person engaged in banditry or related activity
  - Piracy
  - Looting
  - Outlaw
  - Partisan (military)
  - Robbery
  - Theft

== Entertainment ==
- Marauder, the second novel in the Isaac Asimov's Robots in Time series
- One of the four fictional characters in Harry Potter and the Prisoner of Azkaban who created the Marauder's Map
- Marauder (comics), several characters
  - Marauders (comics), a Marvel Comics supervillain team
  - Marauders (comic book), a Marvel Comics comic book launched in 2019
- Marauder (G.I. Joe), a fictional vehicle from the G.I. Joe Battleforce 2000 toy line
- "Marauders" (Star Trek: Enterprise), a second-season episode
- Marauders (World of Darkness), antagonists in the role-playing game Mage: The Ascension

=== Film ===
- The Marauders (1947 film), a Hopalong Cassidy film
- The Marauders (1955 film), starring Dan Duryea
- Marauders (1986 film)
- Starship Troopers 3: Marauder, a 2008 direct-to-DVD film
- Marauders (2016 film)

=== Music ===
- Marauder (Blackfoot album)
- Marauder (Interpol album)
- Marauder (Magnum album)
- Gibson Marauder, electric guitar model
- "The Marauders", a 1983 song by Tears for Fears, B-side to "The Way You Are"

=== Video games ===
- Marauder (video game), a 1988 game developed by Hewson Consultants
- Marauder, a ship class in EVE Online
- Marauder, a class in Star Wars: The Old Republic
- Marauder, a class in Path of Exile
- Marauder Faction in Ryzom
- Marauder, a mech in MechWarrior (video game series)
- Marauders, synthetic creatures derived from Turians in Mass Effect 3
- Marauders, an enemy in Borderlands and Borderlands 2
- Marauder, a class in Final Fantasy XIV: A Realm Reborn
- Savage Marauders, a variant of Locust in Gears of War 3
- Marauder, a Super-heavy class demon in Doom Eternal
- Marauders, a playable faction in New World (video game)
- Marauder Tank, an anti-tank vehicle in Command and Conquer: Generals and Command & Conquer: Generals – Zero Hour
- Marauders, a group of npc enemies in Fortnite

== Sports ==
- Marauders, mascot of the University of Mary, a Benedictine university in Bismarck, ND.
- Marauders, mascot of St. Joseph's Collegiate Institute Catholic Boy's High School in Buffalo, New York.
- Marauders, mascot of Clearwater Central Catholic High School, Clearwater, Florida.
- Bradenton Marauders, a Class A-Advanced baseball team
- Marauders, mascot of Mira Mesa Senior High School, San Diego, California
- Marauders, mascot of Mount Vernon High School (Fortville, Indiana)
- Massachusetts Marauders, a professional American football team
- McMaster Marauders, official mascot and sporting team for McMaster University in Hamilton, Ontario
- Millersville Marauders, athletic teams of Millersville University of Pennsylvania
- Marauder (dinghy), alternative name for the Mirror 14 class dinghy
- Marauder, mascot of Central State University, Wilberforce, Ohio
- Marauder, mascot of Jesuit High School (Sacramento), California
- Marauder, mascot of Edward S. Marcus High School, Flower Mound, Texas
- Marauder, mascot of Mitchell High School, Colorado Springs, Colorado
- Marauder, mascot of Midland Secondary School, Midland, Ontario
- Mauauders, mascot of Antelope Valley College, Lancaster, California
- Marauders, mascot of Bay Shore High School, Bay shore, New York
- Marauders, mascot of Miraleste High School, Rancho Palos Verdes, California
- Marauders, mascot of Walter Murray Collegiate Institute, Saskatoon, Saskatchewan

== Transportation ==
- AVPRO Marauder, British aircraft concept
- Martin B-26 Marauder, American bomber
- Marauder Cars, British sports car company
- Marauder (vehicle), South African armoured vehicle
- Marauder, motorcycle model series from Suzuki
- Mercury Marauder, automobile

== Other uses ==
- MARAUDER, a U.S. government nuclear fusion research project
- Merauder, an American metalcore band
- Masked Marauder, a fictional Marvel Comics character
- Merrill's Marauders, United States commando unit in World War II
- Marauder, the personal starship of Clone Force 99 in Star Wars: The Bad Batch
