= Roller Coaster Corporation of America =

Defunct amusement ride manufacturer

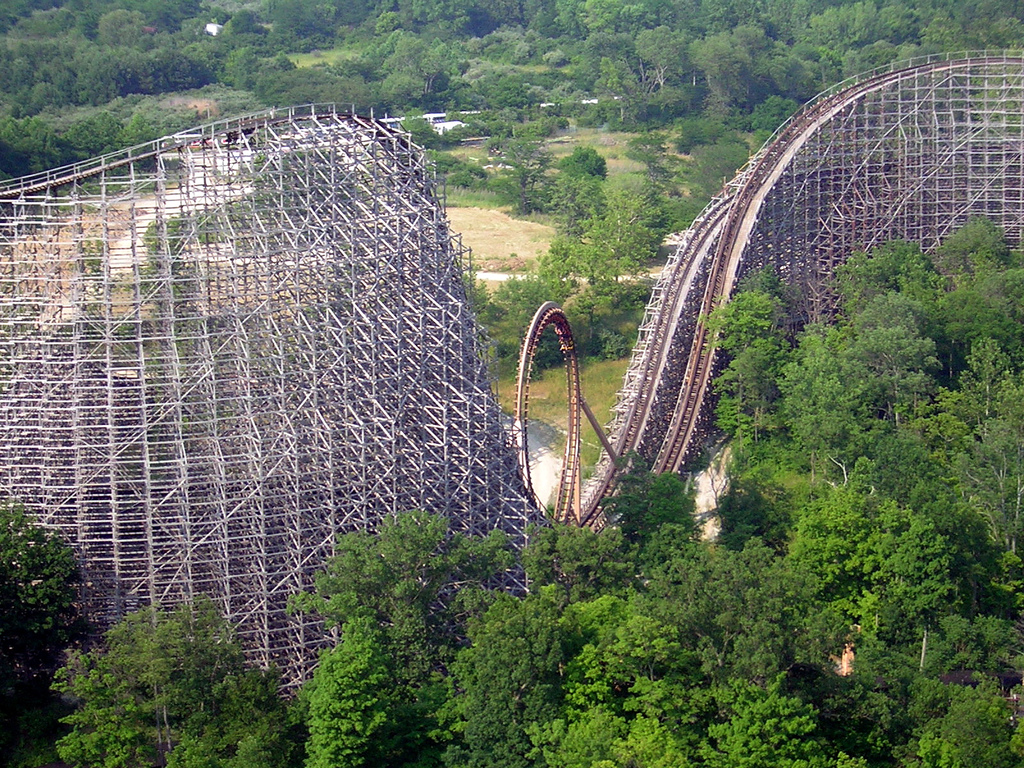
- Son of Beast, the fifth roller coaster that the company built, before its loop was removed
- Company type: Private company
- Founded: 1979
- Defunct: 2005
- Fate: Ceased Operations
- Headquarters: Atlanta, United States
- Area served: Worldwide
- Key people: Michael Black; Stephen Black
- Products: Wooden Roller Coasters
- Owner: Michael Black

Roller Coaster Corporation of America (RCCA) was an amusement ride manufacturer based in the United States. The company's first major project was the Rattler at Six Flags Fiesta Texas in 1992, while their most famous coaster was the Son of Beast at Kings Island, the world's tallest wooden coaster, and the first modern wooden roller coaster with an inversion when it opened in 2000.

== History ==
The Roller Coaster Corporation of America was established in 1979, but the president Michael Black had worked on wooden coaster construction projects before, like the Great American Scream Machine at Six Flags Over Georgia in 1973, with his father Marvin Black and brother Stephen Black. The company prided itself in their manufacturing technique, which involved pre-manufacturing sections of the wooden structure and track at facilities off-site and then assembling on-site. This reduced what could otherwise be a year long construction project to around 6 months. In 1992, under the name Roller Coaster Corporation of Texas, they built the Rattler for Six Flags Fiesta Texas, which opened as the tallest, fastest, and steepest wooden coaster in the world. However, the RCCA faced criticism for rushing through testing, and the ride's high forces led to numerous injuries during the first year of operation.

In 1997, the RCCA was approached by Paramount Kings Island to create the world's first wooden hyper coaster. The result of 3 years of planning and construction was Son of Beast, which opened in May 2000. While reviews were initially positive, the ride deteriorated over the first year, leading to a lawsuit from Kings Island against the RCCA and some of their contractors for shoddy design and insufficient supports. In response, the RCCA claimed that Kings Island had dismissed the company before construction was completed to save money and filed their own suit.

The RCCA built a handful of other coasters in the early 2000s, the most recent being Coaster Express at Parque Warner Madrid in 2002. The company did not continue to build any more roller coasters, and folded in 2005.

== List of roller coasters ==
Roller Coaster Corporation of America built 7 roller coasters around the world. Two are now defunct (Son of Beast and White Canyon) and one has been completely re-done by Rocky Mountain Construction (Rattler).

Name	Model	Park	Country	Opened	Status	Ref
Rattler	Wood Support Structure	Six Flags Fiesta Texas	United States	1992	Converted; Now known as Iron Rattler	
White Canyon	Wood Support Structure	Yomiuriland	Japan	1994	Removed	
Montezum	Wood Support Structure	Hopi Hari	Brazil	1999	Operating	
Bandit; Formerly Wild Wild West	Wood Support Structure	Movie Park Germany	Germany	1999	Operating	
Son of Beast	Wood Support Structure	Kings Island	United States	2000	Removed	
Magnus Colossus	Wood Support Structure	Terra Mítica	Spain	2000	Closed	
Coaster Express; Formerly Wild Wild West	Wood Support Structure	Parque Warner Madrid	Spain	2002	Operating	
