= Robbery =

Taking something belonging to another by force

Robbery (Note: From Old French rober ("to steal, ransack, etc.") from Proto-West Germanic *rauba ("booty")) is the crime of taking or attempting to take anything of value by force, threat of force, or use of fear. According to common law, robbery is defined as taking the property of another, with the intent to permanently deprive the person of that property, by means of force or fear; that is, it is a larceny or theft accomplished by an assault. Precise definitions of the offence may vary between jurisdictions. Robbery is differentiated from other forms of theft (such as burglary, shoplifting, pickpocketing, or car theft) by its inherently violent nature (a violent crime); whereas many lesser forms of theft are punished as misdemeanors, robbery is always a felony in jurisdictions that distinguish between the two. Under English law, most forms of theft are triable either way, whereas robbery is triable only on indictment.

== Etymology ==
The word "rob" came via French from Late Latin words (e.g., deraubare) of Germanic origin, from Common Germanic raub "theft".

== Types of robbery ==
Among the types of robbery are armed robbery, which involves the use of a weapon, and aggravated robbery, when someone brings with them a deadly weapon or something that appears to be a deadly weapon. Highway robbery or mugging takes place outside or in a public place such as a sidewalk, street, or parking lot. Carjacking is the act of stealing a car from a victim by force.

Criminal slang for various kinds of robbery includes "blagging" (armed robbery, usually of a bank), "stickup" (derived from the verbal command "Stick 'em up!" to robbery targets to raise their hands in the air), and "steaming" (organized robbery; originally referred to robbery of trains); see Wiktionary:robbery for more.

== By country ==
=== Canada ===
In Canada, the Criminal Code makes robbery an indictable offence, subject to a maximum penalty of life imprisonment. If the accused uses a restricted or prohibited firearm to commit robbery, there is a mandatory minimum sentence of five years for the first offence, and seven years for subsequent offences.

=== Ireland ===
Robbery is a statutory offence in Ireland. It is created by section 14(1) of the Criminal Justice (Theft and Fraud Offences) Act 2001, which provides:

A person is guilty of robbery if he or she steals, and immediately before or at the time of doing so, and in order to do so, uses force on any person or puts or seeks to put any person in fear of being then and there subjected to force.

=== United Kingdom ===
==== England and Wales ====
Robbery is a statutory offence created by section 8(1) of the Theft Act 1968, which reads:

A person is guilty of robbery if he steals, and immediately before or at the time of doing so, and in order to do so, he uses force on any person or puts or seeks to put any person in fear of being then and there subjected to force.

===== Aggravated theft =====
Robbery is the only offence of aggravated theft.

===== Aggravated robbery =====
There are no offences of aggravated robbery.

===== "Steals" =====
This requires evidence to show a theft as set out in section 1(1) of the Theft Act 1968. In R v Robinson the defendant threatened the victim with a knife in order to recover money which he was actually owed. His conviction for robbery was quashed on the basis that Robinson had an honest, although unreasonable, belief (under Section 2(1)(a) of the Act) in his legal right to the money. See also R v Skivington [1968] 1 QB 166, [1967] 2 WLR 655, 131 JP 265, 111 SJ 72, [1967] 1 All ER 483, 51 Cr App R 167, CA.

In R v Hale (1978) the application of force and the stealing took place in many different locations, and it was not possible to establish the timing; it was held that the appropriation necessary to prove theft was a continuing act, and the jury could correctly convict of robbery. This approach was followed in R v Lockley (1995) when the force was applied to a shopkeeper after property had been taken. It was argued that the theft should be regarded as complete by this time, and R v Gomez (1993), should apply; the court disagreed, preferring to follow R v Hale.

===== Actual or threatened force against a person =====
The threat or use of force must take place immediately before or at the time of the theft. Force used after the theft is complete will not turn the theft into a robbery.

The words "or immediately after" that appeared in section 23(1)(b) of the Larceny Act 1916 were deliberately omitted from section 8(1).

The book Archbold said that the facts in R v Harman, which did not amount to robbery in 1620, would not amount to robbery now.

It was held in R v Dawson and James (1978) that "force" is an ordinary English word and its meaning should be left to the jury. This approach was confirmed in R v Clouden (1985) and Corcoran v Anderton (1980), both handbag-snatching cases. Stealing may involve a young child who is not aware that taking other persons' property is not in order.

===== Threat =====
The victim must be placed in apprehension or fear that force would be used immediately before or at the time of the taking of the property. A threat is not immediate if the wrongdoer threatens to use force of violence some future time.

Robbery occurs if an aggressor forcibly snatched a mobile phone or if they used a knife to make an implied threat of violence to the holder and then took the phone. The person being threatened does not need to be the owner of the property. It is not necessary that the victim was actually frightened, but the defendant must have put or sought to put the victim or some other person in fear of immediate force.

The force or threat may be directed against a third party, for example a customer in a jeweller's shop. Theft accompanied by a threat to damage property does not constitute robbery, but it may disclose an offence of blackmail.

Dishonestly dealing with property stolen during a robbery constitutes an offence of handling.

===== Mode of trial =====
Robbery is an indictable-only offence.

===== Sentence =====
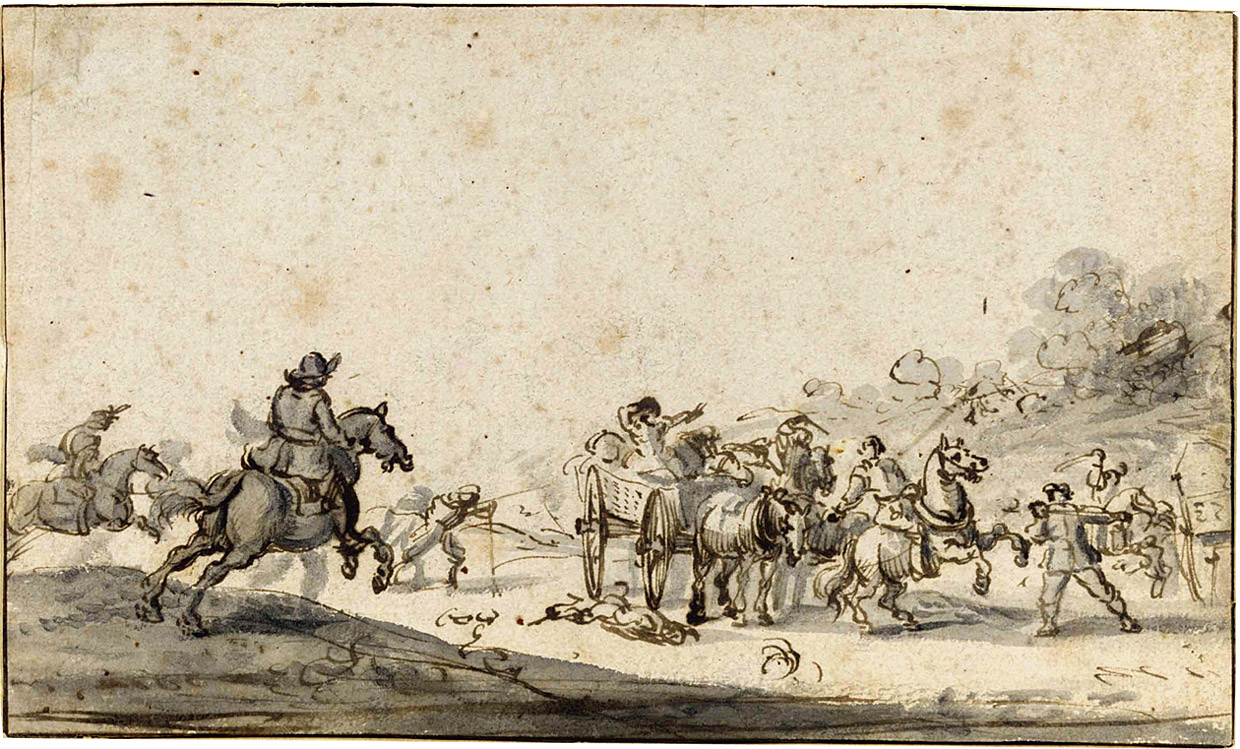
Marauders attacking a group of travellers, by Jacques Courtois

Under current sentencing guidelines, the punishment for robbery is affected by a variety of aggravating and mitigating factors. Particularly important is how much harm was caused to the victim and how much culpability the offender had (e.g. carrying a weapon or leading a group effort implies high culpability). Robbery is divided into three categories which are, in increasing order of seriousness: street or less sophisticated commercial, dwelling, and professionally planned commercial.

Robbery generally results in a custodial sentence. Only a low-harm, low-culpability robbery with other mitigating factors would result in an alternative punishment, in the form of a high-level community order. The maximum legal punishment is imprisonment for life. It is also subject to the mandatory sentencing regime under the Criminal Justice Act 2003. Current sentencing guidelines advise that the sentence should be no longer than 20 years, for a high-harm, high-culpability robbery with other aggravating factors.

The "starting point" sentences are:

- Low-harm, low-culpability street robbery: 1 year
- Medium-harm, medium-culpability street robbery: 4 years
- Medium-harm, medium-culpability professionally planned robbery: 5 years
- High-harm, high-culpability street robbery: 8 years
- High-harm, high-culpability professionally planned robbery: 16 years

An offender may also serve a longer sentence if they are convicted of other offences alongside the robbery, such as assault and grievous bodily harm.

====== Common law ======
Robbery was an offence under the common law of England. Matthew Hale provided the following definition:

Robbery is the felonious and violent taking of any money or goods from the person of another, putting him in fear, be the value thereof above or under one shilling.

The common law offence of robbery was abolished for all purposes not relating to offences committed before 1 January 1969 by section 32(1)(a) of the Theft Act 1968.

====== Statute ======
See sections 40 to 43 of the Larceny Act 1861.

Section 23 of the Larceny Act 1916 read:

23.-(1) Every person who -

(a) being armed with any offensive weapon or instrument, or being together with one other person or more, robs, or assaults with intent to rob, any person;
(b) robs any person and, at the time of or immediately before or immediately after such robbery, uses any personal violence to any person;

shall be guilty of felony and on conviction thereof liable to penal servitude for life, and, in addition, if a male, to be once privately whipped.

(2) Every person who robs any person shall be guilty of felony and on conviction thereof liable to penal servitude for any term not exceeding fourteen years.

(3) Every person who assaults any person with intent to rob shall be guilty of felony and on conviction thereof liable to penal servitude for any term not exceeding five years.

This section provided maximum penalties for a number of offences of robbery and aggravated robbery.

===== Assault with intent to rob =====
If a robbery is foiled before it can be completed, an alternative offence (with the same penalty, given by section 8(2) of the 1968 Act) is assault; any act which intentionally or recklessly causes another to fear the immediate and unlawful use of force, with an intent to rob, will suffice.

The following cases are relevant:

- R v Trusty and Howard (1783) 1 East PC 418
- R v Sharwin (1785) 1 East PC 421

====== Mode of trial and sentence ======
Assault with intent to rob is an indictable-only offence. It is punishable with imprisonment for life or for any shorter term.

Assault with intent to rob is also subject to the mandatory sentencing regime under the Criminal Justice Act 2003.

==== Northern Ireland ====
Robbery is a statutory offence in Northern Ireland. It is created by section 8 of the Theft Act (Northern Ireland) 1969.

=== United States ===
In the United States, robbery is generally treated as an aggravated form of common-law larceny. Specific elements and definitions differ from state to state. The common elements of robbery are a trespassory taking and carrying away of the personal property of another with the intent to steal from the person or presence of the victim by force or threat of force.

The first six elements are the same as common-law larceny. It is the last two elements that aggravate the crime to common-law robbery.

from the person or presence of the victim – robbery requires that the property be taken directly from the person of the victim or from their presence. This is different from larceny, which simply requires that property be taken from the victim's possession, actual or constructive. Property is "on the victim's person" if the victim is actually holding the property, or the property is contained within clothing the victim is wearing or is attached to a victim's body, such as a watch or earrings. Property is in a person's presence when it is within the area of their immediate control. The property has to be close enough to the victim's person that the victim could have prevented its taking if he/she had not been placed in fear or intimidation.

by force or threat of force – the use of force or threat of force is the defining element of robbery. For there to be robbery there must be "force or fear" in perpetrating the theft. Questions concerning the degree of force necessary for robbery have been the subject of much litigation. Merely snatching the property from the victim's person is not sufficient force unless the victim resists or one of the items is attached or carried in such a way that a significant amount of force must be used to free the item from the victim's person.

For robbery the victim must be placed in "fear" of immediate harm by threat or intimidation. The threat need not be directed at the victim personally. Threats to third parties are sufficient. The threat must be one of present rather than future personal harm. Fear does not mean "fright", it means apprehension – an awareness of the danger of immediate bodily harm.

==== California ====
The maximum sentence for robbery in California is 9 years, according to Penal Code section 213(a)(1)(A).

The threat or use of force does not have to take place immediately before or at the time of the theft. Force used after the theft will turn the theft into a robbery unless the theft is complete. The theft is considered completed when the perpetrator reaches a place of temporary safety with the property.

== Robbery statistics ==
=== Reported robberies ===
The United Nations Office on Drugs and Crime notes "that when using the figures, any cross-national comparisons should be conducted with caution because of the differences that exist between the legal definitions of offences in countries, or the different methods of offence counting and recording". Also, not every crime is reported, meaning two things: (1) robbery rates appear lower than they actually are, and (2) the percentage of crime that is not reported is higher in some countries than others; for example, in one country 86% of the robberies were reported, whereas in another country only 67% of the robberies were reported. Crime also varies by certain neighborhoods or areas in each country, so a nationwide rate does not indicate the danger or safety everywhere in that country. A 1983 study by the Department of Justice estimated that the amount of robberies in the US at schools alone may reach one million a year, exceeding the National Crime Survey reported estimate.

Country	Reported annual robberies per 100,000 population	Year
Albania	3.2	2023
Algeria	30.7	2021
Andorra	10.5	2019
Antigua and Barbuda	127.5	2023
Argentina	1010.3	2023
Armenia	7.6	2023
Australia	36.5	2022
Austria	29.3	2023
Azerbaijan	2.9	2021
Bahamas	31.2	2022
Bahrain	27.3	2008
Bangladesh	0.6	2006
Barbados	43.6	2022
Belarus	15.1	2019
Belgium	120.4	2023
Belize	45.4	2022
Benin	1.5	2017
Bermuda	78.6	2017
Bhutan	2.3	2017
Bolivia	174.2	2023
Bosnia and Herzegovina	8.4	2023
Botswana	78.2	2014
Brazil	570.3	2019
Brunei Darussalam	0.5	2006
Bulgaria	13.2	2023
Burundi	41.6	2014
Cabo Verde	432.8	2018
Cameroon	11.4	2021
Canada	60.2	2023
Chile	645.0	2023
Colombia	937.0	2022
Costa Rica	718.3	2023
Croatia	16.2	2023
Cyprus	4.6	2023
Czech Republic	13.3	2023
Denmark	22.3	2023
Dominica	65.8	2022
Dominican Republic	283.3	2023
East Timor	1.8	2017
Ecuador	432.6	2023
Egypt	2.9	2011
El Salvador	37.1	2022
England and Wales	123.3	2023
Estonia	5.6	2023
Eswatini	316.1	2004
Finland	48.7	2023
France	94.7	2023
Georgia	9.8	2019
Germany	53.1	2023
Ghana	4.2	2021
Greece	27.2	2023
Grenada	60.6	2023
Guatemala	184.9	2023
Guinea	1.6	2007
Guinea-Bissau	19.8	2016
Guyana	57.2	2023
Haiti	1.6	2018
Honduras	174.0	2023
Hong Kong	1.3	2023
Hungary	5.5	2023
Iceland	26.1	2023
India	2.8	2013
Indonesia	1.6	2022
Iraq (Central)	4.2	2021
Ireland	31.1	2023
Israel	12.0	2023
Italy	48.3	2023
Ivory Coast	2.7	2008
Jamaica	32.4	2022
Japan	1.1	2023
Jordan	3.5	2023
Kazakhstan	50.8	2017
Kenya	5.8	2018
Kosovo	9.8	2021
Kuwait	23.5	2009
Kyrgyzstan	10.3	2018
Latvia	17.1	2023
Lebanon	43.1	2015
Lesotho	64.1	2009
Liechtenstein	15.2	2023
Lithuania	11.9	2023
Luxembourg	86.2	2023
Macau	1.7	2022
Madagascar	6.8	2015
Malaysia	13.1	2023
Maldives	19.0	2017
Malta	33.0	2023
Mauritius	48.5	2021
Mexico	158.6	2023
Moldova	12.3	2023
Monaco	32.6	2015
Mongolia	11.4	2023
Montenegro	4.3	2023
Morocco	30.4	2023
Mozambique	23.5	2009
Myanmar	0.1	2023
Namibia	166.6	2021
Nepal	0.3	2016
Netherlands	33.2	2023
New Zealand	66.6	2023
Nicaragua	175.9	2019
Nigeria	1.1	2013
North Macedonia	16.1	2023
Northern Ireland	28.6	2023
Norway	25.0	2023
Oman	0.7	2017
Pakistan	32.5	2023
Palestine	9.6	2023
Panama	140.2	2022
Paraguay	83.6	2022
Peru	251.6	2022
Philippines	4.6	2023
Poland	12.0	2023
Portugal	85.9	2023
Puerto Rico	36.6	2022
Qatar	1.6	2021
Romania	16.9	2023
Russia	4.6	2019
Rwanda	25.0	2013
Saint Kitts and Nevis	81.4	2022
Saint Lucia	133.3	2023
Saudi Arabia	0.4	2019
Scotland	35.0	2023
Senegal	17.2	2015
Serbia	9.6	2023
Sierra Leone	3.1	2008
Singapore	0.3	2023
Slovakia	6.0	2023
Slovenia	13.8	2023
Solomon Islands	10.2	2008
South Africa	328.1	2017
South Korea	1.0	2021
Spain	135.1	2023
Sri Lanka	13.1	2019
St. Vincent and Grenadines	66.6	2022
Sudan	9.0	2008
Suriname	100.5	2023
Sweden	60.7	2023
Switzerland	21.8	2023
Syria	4.0	2008
São Tomé and Príncipe	0.5	2011
Tajikistan	3.7	2011
Tanzania	18.0	2015
Thailand	1.7	2023
Trinidad and Tobago	140.6	2020
Turkey	17.0	2023
Turkmenistan	2.7	2006
Uganda	17.0	2017
Ukraine	46.5	2017
United Arab Emirates	3.5	2022
United States of America	63.2	2022
Uruguay	661.5	2023
Uzbekistan	2.9	2021
Vatican City	0.0	2023
Yemen	1.7	2009
Zimbabwe	67.9	2008

=== Prevalence ===
The below table shows the percentage of population which was victim to robbery in the previous 12 months according to United Nations Office on Drugs and Crime, typically through statistical surveys to avoid under-reporting.

Country	Female	Male	Total	Year
Argentina	7.0	5.2	6.2	2016
Australia	0.2	0.3	0.2	2023
Austria	0.2	-	-	2021
Bangladesh	1.2	-	-	2019
Barbados	-	-	2.0	2009
Belarus	0.4	0.6	-	2019
Belgium	2.5	2.4	2.4	2021
Benin	1.9	1.9	-	2021
Bolivia	-	-	2.6	2023
Cabo Verde	1.6	3.1	2.3	2016
Canada	0.7	0.5	0.6	2019
Central African Republic	3.4	7.4	-	2018
Chad	3.0	3.7	-	2019
Chile	4.1	3.9	4.0	2023
Colombia	2.1	2.3	2.2	2022
Comoros	1.3	4.6	-	2022
Costa Rica	-	-	2.9	2023
Croatia	-	-	0.9	2010
Cuba	0.4	0.2	-	2019
Czech Republic	-	-	3.1	2013
DR Congo	4.3	10.7	-	2017
Denmark	0.8	0.8	0.8	2014
Dominican Republic	5.8	5.0	5.4	2022
Ecuador	12.6	15.3	13.8	2011
El Salvador	3.0	3.1	3.1	2019
England and Wales	-	-	0.2	2023
Estonia	-	-	0.7	2018
Eswatini	1.7	5.0	-	2021
Fiji	3.2	4.4	-	2021
France	-	-	0.5	2022
Georgia	0.6	0.4	-	2018
Germany	0.5	0.7	0.6	2020
Guatemala	15.8	62.5	-	2019
Guyana	3.8	6.4	-	2019
Honduras	3.5	5.5	-	2019
Hong Kong	2.1	2.9	2.5	2006
Indonesia	0.0	0.0	0.0	2022
Iraq	0.6	-	-	2018
Iraq (Central)	1.2	2.8	2.7	2020
Ireland	1.0	2.0	1.7	2019
Israel	-	-	0.3	2024
Italy	0.3	0.6	0.5	2016
Jamaica	3.8	-	-	2022
Kiribati	1.7	4.2	-	2018
Kyrgyzstan	1.8	-	-	2018
Lesotho	4.0	7.3	-	2018
Luxembourg	0.6	0.5	0.6	2020
Madagascar	2.6	5.7	-	2018
Malawi	3.6	9.4	-	2019
Mauritius	-	-	15.0	2004
Mexico	4.7	6.0	5.3	2023
Mongolia	2.3	2.5	-	2018
Montenegro	0.7	1.7	-	2018
Myanmar	-	0.2	-	2019
Netherlands	0.1	0.3	0.2	2023
New Zealand	-	-	0.5	2014
Nigeria	4.7	5.6	5.2	2023
Northern Ireland	-	-	0.1	2019
Pakistan	0.5	2.5	-	2019
Palestine	-	-	3.2	2020
Panama	-	-	1.7	2016
Paraguay	6.1	4.9	5.6	2019
Peru	16.5	16.4	16.5	2023
Poland	-	-	2.0	2023
Portugal	1.7	2.1	1.9	2022
Saint Lucia	-	-	0.6	2018
Samoa	0.7	3.9	-	2019
Saudi Arabia	0.1	0.9	0.9	2019
Scotland	-	-	0.2	2021
Serbia	1.0	-	-	2019
Slovenia	0.5	0.7	0.6	2020
South Africa	0.7	0.5	0.6	2021
South Korea	-	-	0.1	2022
St. Vincent and Grenadines	-	-	6.0	2010
Suriname	2.0	3.0	-	2018
Sweden	0.4	1.6	1.0	2023
Switzerland	0.4	0.4	0.4	2021
Thailand	0.1	0.2	-	2022
Tonga	1.2	1.0	-	2019
Trinidad and Tobago	2.3	-	-	2022
Tunisia	1.3	1.9	-	2023
Turkmenistan	0.0	-	-	2019
Turks and Caicos Islands	1.7	1.0	-	2019
Tuvalu	1.8	2.2	-	2019
Uganda	-	-	1.8	2024
United States of America	-	-	0.2	2023
Uruguay	5.0	5.0	5.0	2011
Uzbekistan	0.0	-	-	2021
Vietnam	0.8	0.6	-	2020
Zimbabwe	3.0	5.9	-	2019

== See also ==
- Aircraft hijacking
- Art theft
- Balaclava (clothing)
- Brigandage
- Bushranger
- Convenience store crime
- Crime statistics
- Dacoit
- Flash mob robbery
- Gangs in the United States
- Hajduk
- Highwayman
- Home invasion
- Klepht
- Looting
- Mafia
- Marauder (disambiguation)
- Metal theft
- Millionaire tour
- Organized retail crime
- Outlaw
- Piracy
- Ram-raiding
- Shanlin
- Snapphane
- Snatch theft
- Train robbery
- Truck hijacking

== Sources ==
- Matthew Hale. Historia Placitorum Coronae. 1736. 1800 Edition. Volume 1. Chapter XLVI. pp 532–538.
