= Flash rob =

Robbery with many robbers at once

A flash rob, also known as a multiple offender crime or flash mob robbery, is an organized form of theft in which a group of participants enter a retail shop or convenience store en masse and steal goods and other items. Typically, store workers and employees in these cases quickly become overwhelmed by the large number of participants and cannot stop the theft.

The National Retail Federation does not classify these crimes as "flash mobs" but rather "multiple offender crimes" that utilize "flash mob tactics". In a report, the NRF noted, "multiple offender crimes tend to involve groups or gangs of juveniles who already know each other, which does not earn them the term 'flash mob'."

== Etymology ==
The term often used by the media for this type of event is "flash rob", which originates from flash mobs, where a group of people assemble quickly, perform an unusual and seemingly pointless act, and then disperse.

In Chile this kind of robbery is known as turbazo.

In Brazil this kind of robbery is known as "arrastão".

== Flash rob dynamics ==
Flash robs operate using speed and sheer numbers in order to intimidate any resistance and complete the act before police can respond. While often viewed as a form of theft or looting (the illegal taking of items), these crimes more closely fit the definition of robbery because the large crowd creates an implied threat of violence should employees or bystanders attempt to intervene. Many investigations into these robberies have shown that they are planned ahead of time using social media, and the participants do not all necessarily know each other personally.

=== United States ===
Flash robs have occurred in places such as Chicago, Illinois, Portland, Oregon, Houston, Texas, Jacksonville, Florida, Germantown, Maryland, Beverly Hills, Los Angeles , San Francisco, and Walnut Creek, California.

=== Brazil ===
Brazil has seen mass flash robberies since the early 1990s. In a phenomenon known as arrastão (trawling), mobs will steal money, telephone, watches, rings, bags and sometimes even victim's clothing. The most infamous case of trawling took place on 18 October 1992, on Ipanema beach in Rio de Janeiro, when hundreds of young people ran together in a mass to rob beach goers.

As a result of mass flash robberies, shopping malls in Brazil have heavy security, and typically prevent large crowds of young people from entering the private property, which has been called a form of soft-apartheid. In 2013, a rolezinho (strolling) protest movement arose amongst youth, where thousands of young people coordinated their simultaneous entry to normally inaccessible upscale shopping malls. In some rolezinhos, the police were called and crowds were dispersed with tear gas and flash grenades.

== See also ==
- Steaming
- Convenience store crime
- Crime in the United States
