= Convenience store crime =

For a variety of reasons, convenience stores are often popular targets for a variety of crimes, most notably shoplifting and robbery. In some cities, convenience store crime has become such a problem that special task forces have been created or some stores have been completely closed down. American convenience stores are often direct targets of armed robbery. In some areas of the United States, it is not unusual for clerks to be working behind bulletproof glass windows, even during daylight hours. Some convenience stores may even limit access inside at night, requiring customers to approach a walk-up window specifically for such situations to make purchases. The main dangers are that almost all convenience stores only have one person working night shift, most of the transactions are in cash, and easily resold merchandise, such as liquor, lottery tickets, and cigarettes are on site.

Most convenience stores have a cash drop slot into a time-delay safe so clerks may limit the amount of cash on hand. Many have installed security cameras to help detect robberies and shoplifting. Because of their vulnerability to crime, nearly all convenience stores have a friendly relationship with the local police. To reduce burglaries when the convenience store is closed, some convenience stores will have bars on the windows.

The reasons for the higher rate of crime at convenience stores may be attributable to various factors, including:

- the small number of employees per store makes it difficult to stop or deter criminals
- the extended hours of many convenience stores present more opportunities when few customers and/or witnesses are present
- the smaller size of the stores makes it easy for criminals to quickly navigate the floor plan and enter and exit close to the cash registers
- the majority of purchases are in cash as opposed to electronic transactions, leading to a relatively large amount of cash (often minimally secured) at any point

This type of retail outlet is also often used for perpetrating crimes such as money laundering, sale of counterfeit goods, sale of illegal drugs, tax fraud, and illegal work.

== Robbery ==
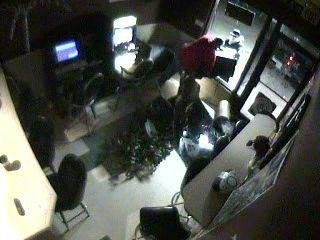
A convenience store robbery captured by a security camera.

In the 1960s, the amount of convenience store crime, such as shoplifting and armed robberies, became an emerging problem, which put the spotlight on store security. As the industry grew, so did robberies and hold-ups. To address this issue, stores used training material provided in part by the National Association of Convenience Stores (NACS) such as the six security workshops in 1971, including the "Why Hold Up Convenience Stores?" workshop, featuring a panel of six ex-convicts — including Ray D. Johnson, who became the first maximum-security prisoner to escape from Folsom Prison. Johnson was also an anti-crime consultant for the Southland Corporation and an anti-crime lecturer. Today, many of the panelists' recommendations still ring true: keep windows clear from clutter, minimize the cash on hand, and place the checkout area at the front of the store, visible from the street.

To gain a better understanding of ways to control and deter convenience store robberies, the Southland Corporation, parent company of 7-Eleven, starting in 1975 invested $2 million in-depth studies of 17,000 convenience store robberies and the individuals most likely to commit the crimes. They discovered that the most important things would-be robbers considered when deciding whether or not to commit a crime were the ease of escape from the store/surrounding area and how much money they thought the store would have on hand. They also discovered that while the acquisition of money was the most important motivation for robberies, a sense of power or thrill from committing the crime was often mentioned as well. The key six points are: (1) Cash control, (2) the clear sight lines, (3) prominent placement of the cash registers, (4) eliminating escape routes so that people cannot stage their car behind a convenience store and then come out and make a quick escape, (5) balanced lighting and (6) employee training.

These points became the 7-Eleven Crime Prevention program which was shared widely throughout the c-store industry. The final element was to tell potential robbers about what you had done. Ray D. Johnson appeared on over 20 Johnny Carson television programs. 7-Eleven's in-house ad agency, The Stanford Agency, created store signage to educate robbers.

In 2008, the NACS newsletter reported that in March the Houston City Council implemented a convenience store ordinance requiring the city's 1,400 stores to register online with the local police department and adopt specific crime-prevention practices. The first year the ordinance was in effect, c-store crime dropped 17 percent, followed in 2009 by a 5 percent decline over the previous year. In 2010, robberies were down 31 percent compared to the year before.

In 2009, gasoline theft cost the U.S. convenience store industry $89 million, a steady decline from the record $300 million reported in 2005. Gas theft cost the industry $109 million in 2008 and $134 million in 2007. The average loss per store in 2009 was $761, and that figure is conservative, since it only includes reported thefts and is based on all convenience stores that sell gasoline, including those in states that mandate full-serve (New Jersey and Oregon) and stores in areas where prepay is the norm. Gasoline theft has declined since September 2005 (post-Hurricane Katrina, when gasoline rapidly increased and topped $3 per gallon) when more stations began mandating prepay for fuel.

== Shoplifting ==
While robberies may be the crime most often associated with convenience stores, shoplifting is also quite common in such establishments. Statistics suggest that 54% of all shoplifters regularly steal from convenience stores. An increasingly common crime is shoplifting by juveniles. Almost 90% of juveniles say they know someone who has shoplifted, and more than half of adult shoplifters claim they began doing so as teenagers. As many convenience stores attract groups of minors, especially after school or on the weekends, they face the challenge of offering their services in a professional manner while closely monitoring the activities of the patrons. Multiple customers at the same time can create opportunities for theft, as one or more members of a group can distract the employees or block their view of certain areas of the store.

== See also ==
- National Association of Convenience Stores
