= Bill Kitchen (inventor) =

American inventor and business executive (born 1948)

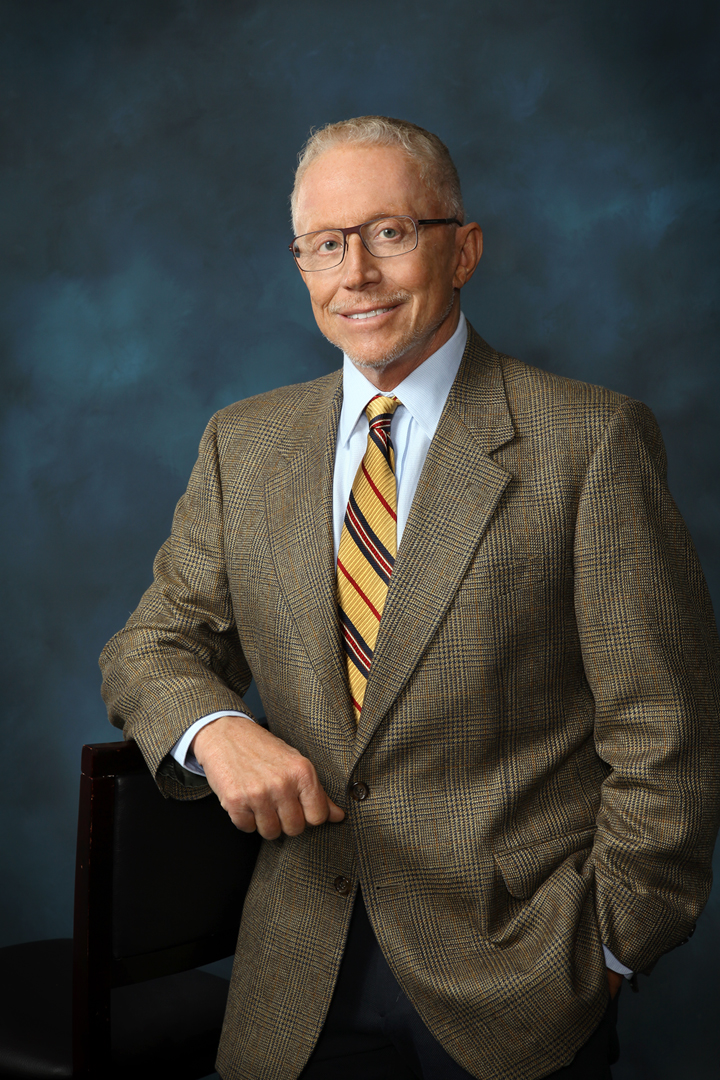
- Born: William Joel Kitchen; Atlanta, Georgia, U.S.
- Employer(s): U.S. ThrillRides, Inc. Thrillcorp, Inc. Polercoaster, Inc. Skyventure, Inc. (1999 - 2001) Sky Fun 1, Inc. (1992 - 1998)
- Known for: Inventor of Skycoaster, iFly (Consumer Vertical Wind Tunnel,) Polercoaster
- Title: Founder and Chairman at US ThrillRides Founder and Chairman Polercoaster Founder and Chairman Thrillcorp

William Joel Kitchen is an American inventor and business executive. He is the founder and CEO of U.S. ThrillRides, Inc. and Thrillcorp, Inc.

== Career ==
Kitchen has a background in electrical engineering and initially put it to use in radio broadcasting before shifting his interests to skydiving and thrill seeking in 1990. He developed a thrill ride company, Sky Fun 1, Inc. with Ken Bird in 1992. Beginning with the resulting "Skycoaster", he continued to develop and sell thrill ride industry concepts through patents including the iFly indoor skydiving wind tunnel, Unicoaster circular ride (operating as Brain Surge), and Polercoaster vertical roller coaster tower ride. In 2015 he founded Thrillcorp, Inc. with longtime business partners Micheal Kitchen and David Gust in order to play a larger role in the physical development and applications of their ride concepts.

== Inventions ==
=== Skycoaster ===
In 1990 Kitchen completed his first skydive and developed an interest in high thrill sports. This led to the founding of Sky Fun 1, Inc. by Kitchen along with Ken Bird in 1992. While they initially offered traditional bungee jumping from a crane, their focus was to develop an idea Kitchen had for a safer alternative to bungee jumping that could be easily installed in amusement parks. In March 2011 Kitchen told the Orlando Sentinel: "I drew on a dinner napkin a picture of a ride which I thought would simulate skydiving without having to jump out of a perfectly good airplane." Kitchen and Bird subsequently filed the initial patent for this ride on August 19, 1992 and the first "Skycoaster" was permanently installed at Kennywood Park in Pittsburgh (West Mifflin), Pennsylvania that year. In 1998, Kitchen licensed his Skycoaster patents to another company in order to focus full-time on his developing a wind tunnel invention.

=== iFly (formerly Skyventure) ===
In 1995, before the sale of Skycoaster, Kitchen began developing his ideas for another method of simulating skydiving by use of a vertical wind tunnel. He filed the first version of this patent as a "Skydiving Trainer Windtunnel" that year. Kitchen then hired an engineer named Michael Palmer to assist him in refining his concept and in 1998, after licensing the Skycoaster business, filed an improved patent that represented the first proof of concept and prototype Skyventure location in Orlando, Florida. Kitchen's Skyventure attracted the attention of Alan Metni, of the U.S. Skydiving team, Airspeed, after a training session there. They began working together to expand the business and in 2002 Kitchen sold to Metni the rights to the Skyventure business which was then rebranded as iFly.

=== Unicoaster ===
In 2006, Kitchen filed the first patent for his "Big wheel roundabout amusement ride" he developed along with John Chance. Chance Rides, Inc. then developed the first park-based installation under license, branded for Nickelodeon Universe as BrainSurge on March 20, 2010. The following year, a second installation was opened in San Diego's Belmont Park on January 16, 2011. After further developing the concept into a full roller-coaster style track ride, Kitchen filed a supplemental patent. Shortly after Chance Rides opened the most recent Unicoaster ("Jimmy Neutron's Atom Smasher") at the American Dream on October 25, 2019, Kitchen made a deal with them to regain all manufacturing and distribution rights for all future versions of the Unicoaster.

=== Polercoaster ===
In 2009, Kitchen filed to change the name of his company, then called "Patent Lab, LLC" (Previously Skyventure, Inc.) into its current incarnation, U.S. Thrillrides, LLC. Then in 2011, he filed a patent for a "Tower Ride" that would become the basis for both his Skyspire and Polercoaster ride concepts. By November, 2014 Kitchen had licensed the Florida rights for his invention to Skyplex where it was announced the first Polercoaster would be the tallest rollercoaster in the world, (called the "Skyscraper") and would be built by 2017. The project was delayed by setbacks however, as Universal Studios, Orlando lobbied the county's zoning and planning board to deny the required building permits in 2015, resulting in an advisory vote against the project. The well publicized debate drew public attention, resulting in a vote and subsequent win for the developers of Skyplex, Joshua Wallack, Bernard and Robert Friedman, along with Kitchen who had remained a consultant on the project. After a number of additional administrative and budget-related setbacks, the Skyplex project was still claimed to be moving forward but hadn't broke ground and the opening was set for 2020 as claimed by the developer. The project was then cancelled in 2023, after the companies that were set to build the project went bankrupt.

In addition to Orlando, Kitchen sold exclusive building rights to Wallack and the Friedmans to build in Atlantic City, New Jersey, which was announced in April 2017 for a 2019 projected completion date. In 2018 that project was reported to be delayed with no visible development, however all parties involved insisted the project was in the works as of February 2020. One of the earliest potential sites, Las Vegas, was announced in 2013 but had seen no visible development beyond initial reporting and planning.

=== Skyspire ===
Using the same patent, Kitchen developed the concept of Skyspire along with Polercoaster to be a scenic, family friendly, ferris-wheel view type of ride in a smaller land area. After many proposals, U.S. Thrill Rides' Skyspire was chosen as one of the five finalists to anchor the San Diego Bay revitalization project. Skyspire won the contract with 1HWY1 who took primary ownership of redesigning the initial concept and implementation, but encountered numerous obstacles that have hindered development to the present day.
