= Steel Curtain (disambiguation) =

Steel Curtain was the name of the Pittsburgh Steelers defense throughout the 1970s

Steel Curtain may refer to:

- Operation Steel Curtain, a military operation executed by coalition forces in 2005
- Steel Curtain (roller coaster), a steel roller coaster at Kennywood in West Mifflin, Pennsylvania

== See also ==
- Iron Curtain
