= Skyscraper (roller coaster) =

Cancelled roller coaster concept

- Concept art of the Skyplex complex featuring Skyscraper

Skyplex
- Location: Skyplex
- Coordinates: 28.45017°N 81.47066°W

General statistics
- Type: Steel
- Manufacturer: Intamin
- Designer: US Thrill Rides
- Model: Polercoaster
- Track layout: Custom
- Speed: 65 mph (105 km/h)
- Inversions: 7
- Max vertical angle: 123°
- Capacity: 1000 riders per hour
- Trains: Several trains with a single car. Riders are arranged 4 across in 2 rows for a total of 8 riders per train.

Skyscraper was a roller coaster concept originally planned for a future Skyplex entertainment complex located in Orlando, Florida. Development began in 2012 by American manufacturer US Thrill Rides and Swiss manufacturer Intamin, with both companies designing the attraction as the first Polercoaster model utilizing an observation tower for its main support structure. Skyscraper would have been the tallest roller coaster in the world at over 500 feet (150 m), and it would have featured both the steepest drop and highest inversion in the world.

Developers anticipated completion by 2016, but a number of delays resulted in the date being pushed back several times. By 2019, the status of the project fell into uncertainty with the removal of the project's website and lack of updates from developers. In 2022, the companies funding the project filed for Chapter 11 bankruptcy. On October 17, it was confirmed that the project has been officially cancelled, with the unused land being put up for sale.

== History ==
In 2012, Wallack Holdings, owners of Mango's Tropical Café in Orlando, selected the Polercoaster design concept pitched by US Thrill Rides to become their flagship attraction at the future-planned Skyplex indoor entertainment complex. After several successful negotiations for land, the development of both the roller coaster and Skyplex began. In May 2014, investment for the project was sought, and a website was formed to assist with the endeavor. Documents uncovered by an Orlando news agency revealed that the roller coaster would be located in Central Florida along International Drive at the intersection with Sand Lake Road.

Skyscraper was officially announced on June 5, 2014. Construction on the main complex was expected to begin in 2015, with the ride opening in 2016. However, design changes and a lengthy process for obtaining the necessary permits caused several delays in breaking ground, and the timeline was updated to reflect construction on the complex beginning in mid-2017. The addition of virtual reality headsets to Skyscraper was announced in late 2016, and the expected opening date was updated to 2019. By April 2017, portions of the roller coaster's track had been completed by Intamin and were placed in storage, but construction of the complex was put on indefinite hold pending permit approval which did not come to fruition.

In January 2019, Skyplex's budget was scaled back from $500 million to $250 million, with plans to retain Skyscraper's original coaster design but include less retail development around the base of the structure. The complex's projected opening date was pushed back further to 2020, with rides opening sometime later. By June 2019, the website promoting the project was taken down, and reports surfaced in 2020 that Universal used a variety of legal tactics to derail the project. The last update from the developers on Facebook was in December 2017, and their Twitter (now known as X) feed went dormant two years earlier.

In January 2019, it was announced that the Skyplex project as a whole had been scaled back, but the size of the tower and 2020 opening date would remain unchanged. In 2021, Joshua Wallack revealed that Wallack Holdings had signed a licensing deal with Lionsgate Entertainment to open Skyplex as a Lionsgate Entertainment World resort, centered around the Skyscraper roller coaster, but the project lost its financing in early 2020 as theme parks in Florida were being forced to closed due to the COVID-19 pandemic. In late 2021, Wallack Holdings still held the licensing deal and Joshua Wallack said that while he still wanted to build a roller coaster on the property, practical considerations had him considering other uses for the site such as a resort hotel to support the nearby upcoming Universal Epic Universe theme park. On December 21, 2022, US Thrill Rides LLC and Polercoaster LLC, the companies behind the project, filed for Chapter 11 bankruptcy.

== Characteristics ==
US Thrill Ride designed the steel track of Skyscraper to be approximately 5,200 feet (1,600 m) long, featuring seven inversions, including zero-g rolls and raven turns. Skyscraper would have operated with several small trains, each one with two rows that seat four riders each for a total of eight riders per train. Its theoretical capacity was 1000 riders per hour, and each seat would feature a lap restraint as opposed to over-the-shoulder harnesses to avoid obstructing the view. Skyscraper would've been 35 meters (114 feet) taller than the former world record holder, Kingda Ka, which opened at Six Flags Great Adventure in 2005.

== Records ==
Upon completion, Skyscraper would have broken multiple records among roller coasters. With a structure exceeding 500 feet (150 m) in height, it was set to pass Kingda Ka's 456-foot (139 m) height record to become the world's tallest roller coaster. Skyscraper was also designed to have had an inversion near the highest point of the ride, which would have broken the 170-foot-tall (52 m) inversion record held by Cedar Point's GateKeeper at the time. Skyscraper's first drop of 123 degrees would have set the record for steepness, and it would have become the first coaster to feature two beyond-vertical drops.
