= Skyquest =

SkyQuest or Skyquest can refer to:

== Companies ==
- SkyQuest (aircraft), a variant of the SlipStream Genesis aircraft
- SkyQuest (ride), a people mover by US Thrill Rides
