= US Thrill Rides =

Defunct American amusement ride company

- Industry: Manufacturing and design
- Predecessor: Patent Lab, LLC
- Founded: 1992; 34 years ago
- Founder: Bill Kitchen (Inventor)
- Defunct: December 21, 2022; 3 years ago
- Headquarters: Orlando, Florida, United States
- Area served: Worldwide
- Products: Amusement rides, roller coasters

US Thrill Rides was an entertainment design and consulting company in Orlando, Florida. It was best known for creating thrill rides in several US locations, hence its name.

== History ==
In 1992, William Kitchen and Ken Bird invented the SkyCoaster. Kitchen founded Sky Fun I Inc. that same year to sell the product to amusement parks. Canadian firm ThrillTime Entertainment International purchased the company for $12 million in mid-1998, renaming it SkyCoaster Inc. All 12 employees kept their jobs, with Kitchen remaining linked to the company as a consultant.

Kitchen's next invention was that of the SkyVenture, sold under SkyVenture, LLC. The first installation opened across from Wet 'n Wild Orlando on International Drive in July 1998. The attraction received a visit by George H. W. Bush.

Kitchen next founded US Thrill Rides. US Thrill Rides has since developed the UniCoaster flat rides and SkyQuest transport rides, as well as the SkySpire and Polercoaster (in collaboration with Intamin).

Martin & Vleminckx acquired Kitchen's portfolio of rides in November 2022. On December 21, 2022, US Thrill Rides filed for Chapter 11 bankruptcy and quietly shuttered.

== Products and technologies ==
US Thrill Rides specialized in amusement rides and attractions.

=== Polercoaster ===
Polercoaster was an amusement ride offered as a joint venture by US Thrill Rides and Intamin. An installation consists of a large tower structure which featured glass elevators to an observation deck, as well as an El Loco steel roller coaster wrapping around the tower. The model was first introduced in 2012. US Thrill Rides' Bill and Michael Kitchen invented the concept to allow amusement parks with little available space to be able to design a full-size roller coaster. By November 2014 Kitchen had licensed the Florida rights for his invention to Skyplex where it was announced the first Polercoaster (called the "Skyscraper") would’ve been the tallest rollercoaster in the world and would be built by 2017. The Skyplex project was claimed to be moving forward but had not broken ground and did not opened in 2020 as previously claimed by the developer. In 2023, Winter Park Construction (WPC) confirmed that the project was not moving forward, resulting in its eventual cancellation.

=== SkyQuest ===
SkyQuest was a people mover introduced in 2010. The cable-car style ride utilizes covered platforms and gondolas to move rides either around the track or from one platform to another.

=== SkySpire ===
SkySpire was an amusement ride offered by US Thrill Rides. An installation consists of a large tower structure which features glass elevators to an observation deck, as well as a ride featuring fully enclosed gondolas wrapping around the tower in the shape of a double helix. Skyspire was chosen as one of the five finalists to anchor the San Diego Bay revitalization project. Skyspire won the contract with 1HWY1 who took primary ownership of redesigning the initial concept and implementation, but encountered numerous obstacles that have hindered development to the present day.

=== SkyView ===
SkyView was a proposed concept for lightweight Ferris wheel designs with heights between 200 feet (61 m) and 1,000 feet (300 m) and able to withstand strong winds. The wheel itself does not turn like a conventional Ferris wheel, instead a chain-like mechanism is used to move the gondolas around the structure, which could be constructed in shapes other than the traditional circle. In 2009, Park World Online reported that US Thrill Rides planned to erect and operate 300-foot (91 m) tall SkyView rides in Orlando and Las Vegas, however the 400-foot (120 m) Orlando Eye and 550-foot (170 m) High Roller giant wheels have since been constructed in those cities. No SkyView rides have yet been built.

=== UniCoaster ===
UniCoaster was an amusement ride with a small footprint designed to mimic the experience of a looping roller coaster. The design was licensed exclusively to Chance Rides until 2020 when Kitchen cancelled the exclusivity and began marketing variations such as "Unicoaster Roulette" to casinos in an attempt to mitigate the financial impact of the COVID-19 theme park shutdown.

== Notable installations ==
Year	Ride	Location	Notes
2010	BrainSurge (UniCoaster)	Nickelodeon Universe – Bloomington, Minnesota	First park installation of ride
2010	Octotron (UniCoaster)	Belmont Park – San Diego, California	Removed in December 2024
2012	SkyQuest	Indianapolis Zoo – Indianapolis, Indiana	
2013	Unicoaster (UniCoaster)	Happy Valley Tianjin - Tianjin, China	
2016	Trouble Twist (Formerly Zero Gravity) (UniCoaster)	Galaxyland - Edmonton, Alberta	
2019	Jimmy Neutron Atom Smasher (UniCoaster)	Nickelodeon Universe American Dream - East Rutherford, New Jersey	
2021	Time Tumbler (UniCoaster)	Doha Quest	
2022	Rivet Town Roller (UniCoaster)	Genting SkyWorlds – Genting Highlands, Malaysia	
