= Polercoaster =

Unbuilt amusement ride

- A concept image released in 2012 for the Polercoaster
- Status: Cancelled/scrapped
- No. of installations: 4 cancelled
- Manufacturer: Intamin
- Designer: US Thrill Rides
- Capacity: 850–1,600 riders per hour

Polercoaster was a type of amusement ride offered by US Thrill Rides and Intamin. An installation would have consisted of a large tower structure, featuring glass elevators to an observation deck, as well as a steel roller coaster wrapping around the tower. The model was introduced in 2012, and the next year, four were proposed for construction. However, US Thrill Rides cancelled all future Polercoaster locations after the company went bankrupt.

== History ==
At the 2011 International Association of Amusement Parks and Attractions (IAAPA) Trade Show in Orlando, Florida, the Polercoaster was initially announced as a joint venture between US Thrill Rides and S&S Worldwide. US Thrill Rides' Bill and Michael Kitchen invented the concept to allow amusement parks with little available space to be able to design a full-size roller coaster. S&S Worldwide would manufacture roller coaster component, which would be designed by Alan Schilke. US Thrill Rides and S&S Worldwide would have subcontract parts of the ride's fabrication to Celtic Engineering and Haskell Steel.

Bill Kitchen was pleased with the ride's initial reception at the show stating "we should have firm contracts signed by the end of the year", with anticipation that at least one installation would open in 2014. The first contracts were announced in late 2013 with design and construction expected to take 24 months.

In July 2015, it was announced that the supply contract for the Orlando Polarcoaster had been awarded to Intamin, and that S&S was no longer involved.

During July 2022, it was announced that US Thrill Rides, the ride’s designer, had filed a lawsuit with Intamin for an alleged misappropriation of trade secrets and copyright infringement over a roller coaster designed and built by Intamin, located at the Dubai Hills Estate Mall Development, which US Thrill Rides claims to be a direct copy of the Polercoaster. On December 21, 2022, US Thrill Rides, the ride’s manufacturer, filed for Chapter 11 bankruptcy.

As of April 2026, Polercoaster is a product of MV Rides (Martin & Vleminckx) and can be found on their product website. Their brochure indicates a patent pending or granted 2023.

== Specifications ==
General specifications of the ride were listed at the Polercoaster's debut at IAAPA 2011. Two glass elevators would have transported riders to the top of the tower. This area would have featured dining or retail space, or the potential for a dark ride. Statistics of the two standard towers that were proposed were shown in the table below. Although these were two standard models, the Polercoaster could have been designed between 100 feet (30 m) tall or greater than 500-foot (150 m) tall.

Height	200 ft or 61 m	300 ft or 91 m
Lift height	180 ft or 55 m	270 ft or 82 m
Track length	2,400 ft or 730 m	3,300 ft or 1,000 m
Tower diameter	50 ft or 15 m	70 ft or 21 m
Top speed	44 mph or 71 km/h	50 mph or 80 km/h
Maximum g-force	4 Gs	
Duration	108 seconds	144 seconds
Capacity	960 riders per hour	
Trains	8 eight-seater trains	

== Installations ==
LakePoint Sporting Community in Georgia, United States was announced as the first installation of a Polercoaster. The ride, which was set to debut in 2015, would have stood approximately 325 feet (99 m) tall. The project has stalled, however, and as of December 1, 2015, there was no mention of the Polercoaster on LakePoint Sporting Community's website.

A second sale of the ride was confirmed for a Florida location at the IAAPA Trade Show in 2013. The location was officially confirmed on June 5, 2014 as going to the new Mango's Tropical Cafe development project on International Drive in Orlando, Florida, as well as the roller coaster's name, Skyscraper. The ride was to stand 570 feet (170 m) tall and begin with an inversion at its maximum height. As a result, it would have become the tallest roller coaster in the world, beating the 456-foot-tall (139 m) record then held by Six Flags Great Adventure's Kingda Ka, which closed in 2024 and was imploded in 2025; it was to feature the world's tallest inversion, surpassing the 197-foot-tall (60 m) inversion on Kennywood's Steel Curtain; and it was to be among the longest roller coasters in the world, with a track length of approximately 5,200 feet (1,600 m).

ABC News reported in June 2013 that a third installation had been proposed for the Las Vegas Strip, standing 650 feet (200 m) tall.

In May 2015, Wallack Holdings, who was developing the Orlando Polercoaster, was reported to be in talks to build a Polercoaster on the Atlantic City Boardwalk. The roller coaster reportedly went into the design phase in July 2015, with a planned height of nearly 350 feet (110 m). In December 2024, the Orlando site planned for Skyplex and its Skyscraper Polercoaster was put up for sale or lease, confirming that the project had been cancelled.

While the Polercoaster is listed as a product by MV Rides (Martin & Vleminckx) no installation locations have been listed, indicating none are currently built as of October 2026.
