= Log Jammer (Kennywood) =

Defunct log flume ride

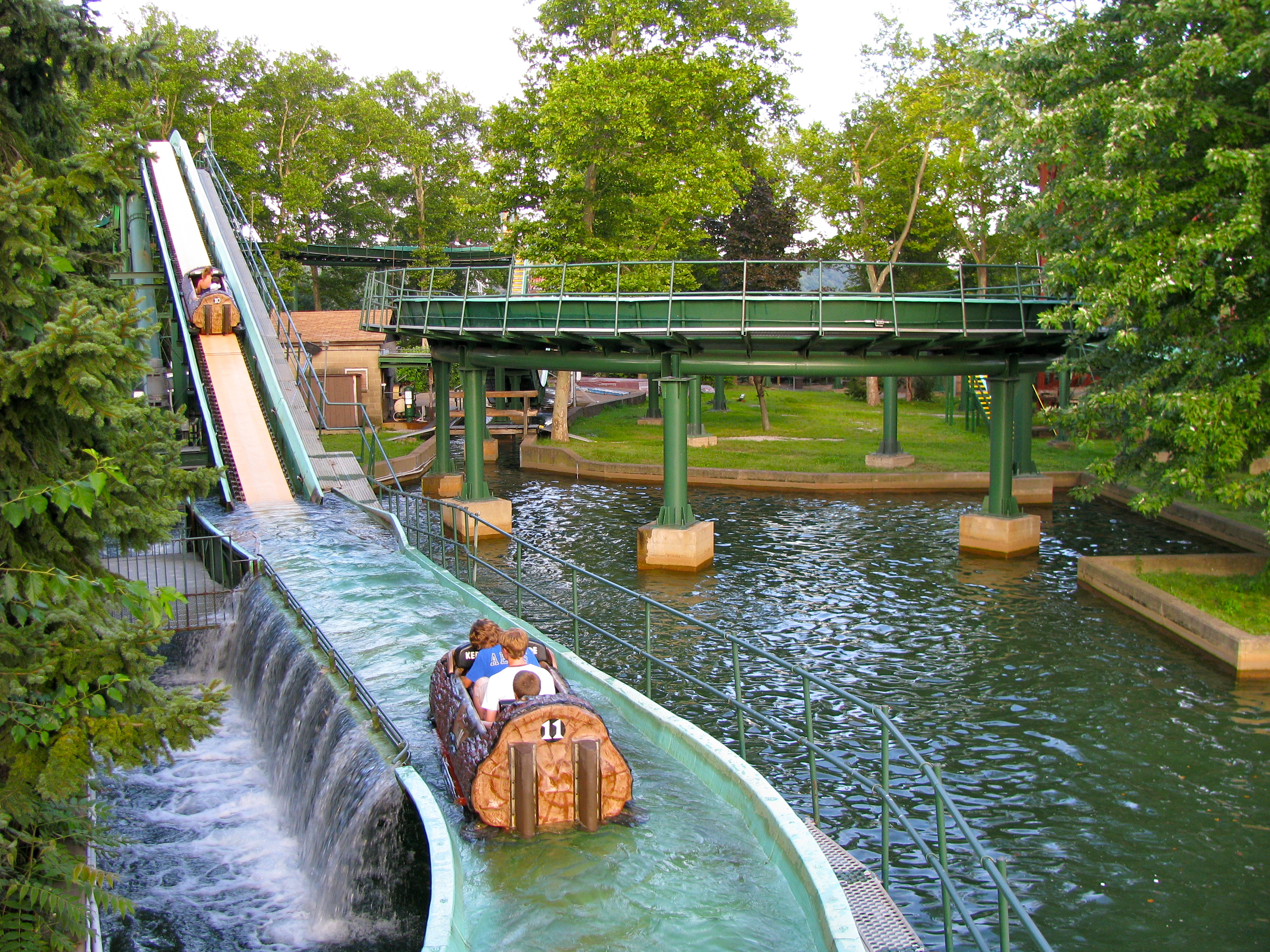
- Riders at the beginning of Log Jammer

Kennywood
- Status: Removed
- Cost: US$1,000,000
- Opening date: May 11, 1975
- Closing date: September 17, 2017
- Replaced by: Steel Curtain

General statistics
- Type: Log flume
- Manufacturer: Arrow Development
- Drop: 53 ft (16 m)
- Length: 1,650 ft (500 m)
- Capacity: 1,200 riders per hour
- Height restriction: 36 in (91 cm)

Log Jammer was a log flume ride at Kennywood amusement park in West Mifflin, Pennsylvania. It opened on May 11, 1975, and was manufactured by Arrow Development. It was the park's first million-dollar ride. The ride was distinctive because of its spillway drop. Although the spillway drop was featured on several of Arrow Development's flume rides, all were eventually removed with the exception of Log Jammer's. The ride was permanently closed at the end of the 2017 season on September 17, 2017. It was removed to make room for Steel Curtain, a roller coaster which opened in 2019. There was controversy over the closure of Log Jammer. Kennywood received minor social media backlash, and several online petitions were started in hopes of saving the ride, though they were unsuccessful.

== Ride experience ==
Log Jammer traveled through the wooded areas of Kennywood in the far right corner of the park. The ride included two lift hills, a 27-foot (8.2 m) spillway drop and a 53-foot (16 m) drop down the final chute. One of the ride's notable features was the spillway, which included a short uphill section.
