= Xtreme Skyflyer =

Skycoaster at several Six Flags parks

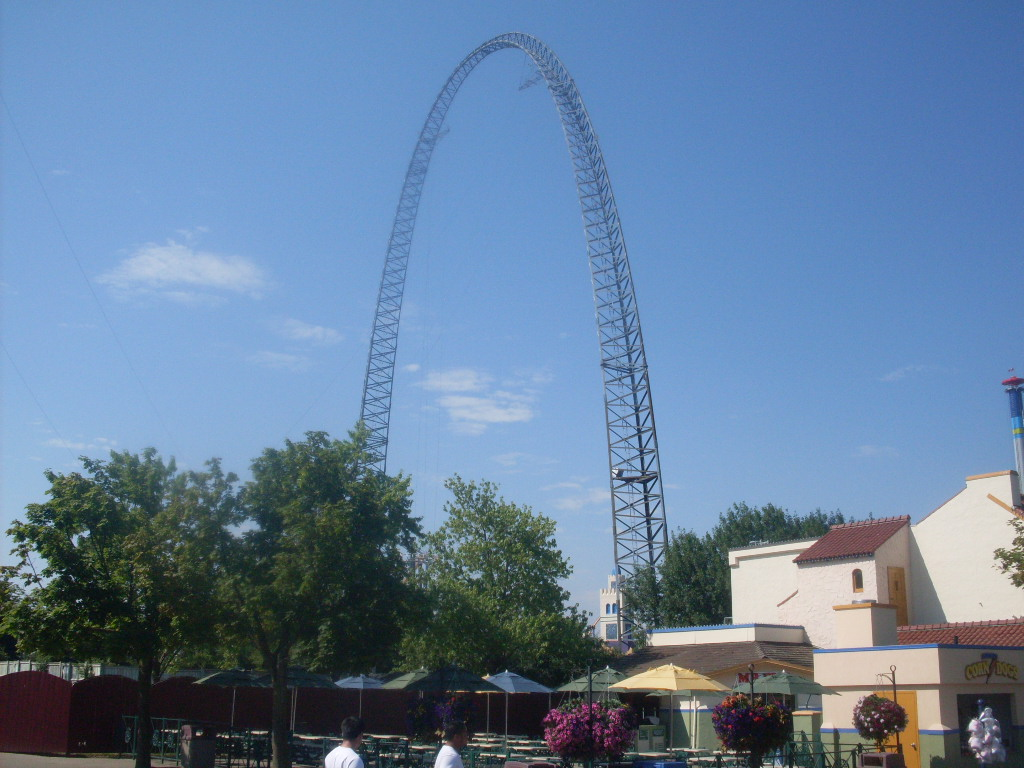
- The "arch" in 2011 at Canada's Wonderland

Canada's Wonderland
- Area: Grande World Exposition of 1890
- Status: Removed
- Opening date: 1996
- Closing date: 2023
- Replaced by: AlpenFury

California's Great America
- Area: Celebration Plaza
- Status: Operating
- Opening date: March 15, 1997

Carowinds
- Area: Thunder Road
- Status: Operating
- Opening date: June 30, 1995

Kings Dominion
- Area: Candy Apple Grove
- Status: Closed
- Opening date: March 30, 1996
- Closing date: 2025

Kings Island
- Area: Action Zone
- Status: Removed
- Opening date: 1995
- Closing date: 2024

Ride statistics
- Manufacturer: Skycoaster
- Model: Dual Swing
- Height: 45.6 m (150 ft)
- Drop: 45.6 m (150 ft)
- Participants per group: 1 - 3
- Duration: Varies (Anywhere around 3-5 minutes)
- Height restriction: 42 in (107 cm)
- Single rider line available
- This is a pay-per-use attraction

Xtreme Skyflyer, known as RipCord at Carowinds, is a Skycoaster model located at several Six Flags parks. At each park, it is pay-per-ride attraction in which guests are required to pay an additional fee to ride, separate from park admission. The Carowinds and Kings Island installations opened in 1995, while the installations at Canada's Wonderland and Kings Dominion opened in 1996. California's Great America was the last location to open an Xtreme Skyflyer in 1997.

On February 8, 2024, it was announced that Xtreme Skyflyer would permanently shut down at Canada's Wonderland to make way for future park expansion. Kings Island followed suit the following season, removing their installation after the 2024 season.

On November 6, 2026, Six Flags announced that California’s Great America would be permanently closing on September 6, 2027.

== Ride description ==
=== Structure ===
Xtreme Skyflyer's structure consists of several main elements, including an arch where the cables holding the riders are attached to. There are also two towers which hold the lift cables. Riders are lifted to the top of either tower and then can release by pulling a cable release. The ride also utilizes a scissor lift, which raises and lowers to assist riders with loading and unloading from the cable harness.

=== Summary ===
Video of ride experience at California's Great America

Riders first step onto a scissor lift, where they are raised into loading position. Operators on the platform hook riders onto a cable that is directly connected to the arch above. Another cable is connected to one of the two rear towers. After the loading platform retracts, riders are raised up to the top of one tower, and then one rider is assigned the task of pulling the ripcord, which releases the tower cable's connection and begins the free-fall. Riders experience a brief moment of freefall before entering a swinging motion. After swinging back and forth for a short time, a ride operator will raise a cable loop attached to a metal pole for one rider to grab onto, helping to bring the swinging motion to a stop and positioning the riders back over the scissor lift platform. The previous riders are unloaded as any new riders waiting to ride are attached.

Prior to the ripcord being pulled, an operator will usually state the tower number and give instructions to pull the cord by saying, "Tower one (or two). 3, 2, 1, fly." One complete cycle can last anywhere from 3 to 5 minutes.
