= AlpenFury =

Roller coaster at Canada's Wonderland

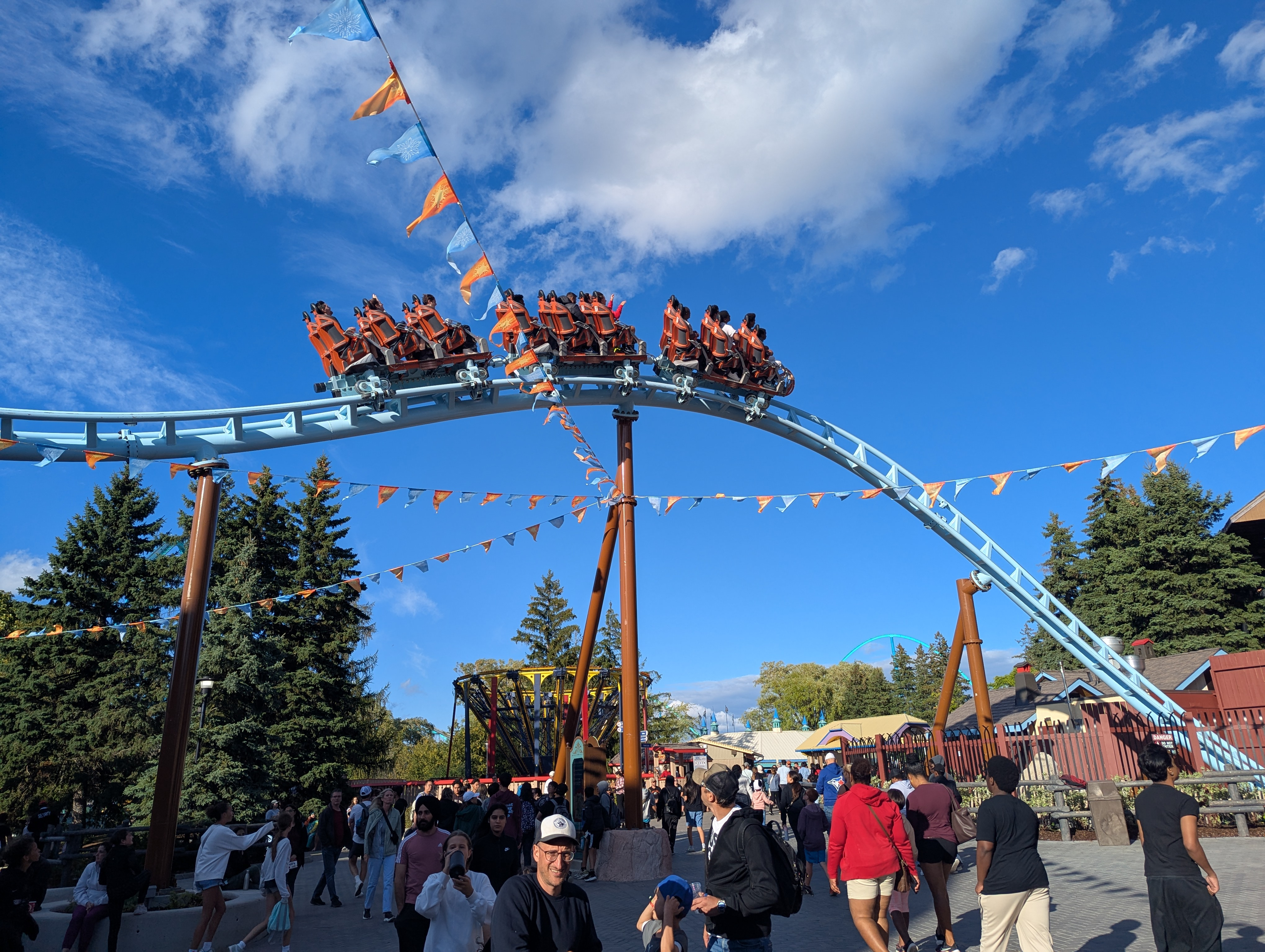
- The coaster in August 2025

Canada’s Wonderland
- Location: Canada’s Wonderland
- Park section: Alpenfest
- Coordinates: 43°50′30″N 79°32′35″W
- Status: Operating
- Soft opening date: 11 July 2025
- Opening date: 12 July 2025
- Replaced: Xtreme Skyflyer

General statistics
- Type: Steel – Launched
- Manufacturer: Premier Rides
- Model: Sky Rocket
- Track layout: Out and back
- Lift/launch system: Linear synchronous motor
- Height: 50 m (164 ft)
- Drop: 47 m (154 ft)
- Length: 1,000 m (3,281 ft)
- Speed: 115 km/h (71 mph)
- Inversions: 9
- Duration: 1:20
- Height restriction: 137–205 cm (4 ft 6 in – 6 ft 9 in)
- Trains: 2 trains with 3 cars; riders arranged 2 across in 3 rows for a total of 18 riders per train
- Website: Official site
- Fast Lane Plus only available
- Single rider line Available
- AlpenFury at RCDB

AlpenFury is a steel launched roller coaster located at Canada's Wonderland in Vaughan, Ontario, Canada. Manufactured by Premier Rides, the ride opened to the public on 12 July 2025 and was marketed as the tallest, fastest, and longest launch coaster in Canada. It features nine inversions and became the park's 18th roller coaster. It is also the first new roller coaster for Canada's Wonderland since the merger between Cedar Fair and Six Flags became active under the latter's name in July 2024.

== History ==
In July 2023, Canada's Wonderland released a survey asking guests about three future roller coaster concepts. The concepts were a "Blast Coaster", "Concert Coaster", and "Eureka Ridge Ghost Town" featuring a family wooden roller coaster. The Blast Coaster concept was described as a Wing Coaster that would be launched out of the top of Wonder Mountain. Canada's Wonderland had in actuality begun to develop the former in mid-2022, soliciting design bids from several manufacturers. By the fall of 2023, Baltimore-based Premier Rides had been attached to the project; they had previously manufactured Backlot Stunt Coaster for the park in 2005, then known as Italian Job: Stunt Track.

Canada's Wonderland removed Xtreme Skyflyer, a Skycoaster, in March 2024 and began teasing a new attraction near Wonder Mountain. On 20 July 2024, Canada's Wonderland posted to its Instagram feed with the caption "Discover the legend within.... 8/8", indicating the date that the teased ride would be announced to the public, complete with a fire and ice theme. Construction fences installed near the mountain during the 2024 season read "Something big is coming. Stay tuned".

AlpenFury was announced as promised on 8 August 2024, with the name, specifications, and storyline behind it released to the press. The first sections of steel track and supports arrived at the park on 26 August.

== Characteristics ==
AlpenFury is the longest, tallest, and fastest launch roller coaster in Canada. It reaches a height of 50 metres (164 ft), span 1,000 metres (3,281 ft) around Wonder Mountain and the entrance to the Grand World Exposition of 1890 area with the station in the Alpenfest area and achieve speeds of 115 kilometres per hour (71 mph). It features nine inversions – the most of any launch coaster and is tied for most inversions on any coaster in North America.

It is the only ride in the park to feature pyrotechnics and is designed such that fire discharges out from the top of Wonder Mountain timed to the coaster train's exit from the summit. However, AlpenFury is not the first roller coaster at Canada's Wonderland to have featured pyrotechnics. Backlot Stunt Coaster formerly had pyrotechnics back when it was known as Italian Job: Stunt Track; it was removed upon de-theming and renaming as a result of Cedar Fair acquiring the park from CBS Corporation (successor of the original Viacom) in 2006 and Cedar Fair not having the license to use Paramount IPs from CBS Corporation. Other notable elements include the Fire Serpent Roll, which offers a twisting inversion with two near-miss interactions between the train and track; the Skyflyer Loop, which features an ascending helix that climbs into a zero-G stall where the ride experiences weightlessness, before diving into an inverted, descending roll, and named after the former Xtreme Skyflyer; and the Ice Winder Roll, which twists and untwists in two inversions as they ascend and descend through an overbanked hill.

== Ride vehicles ==
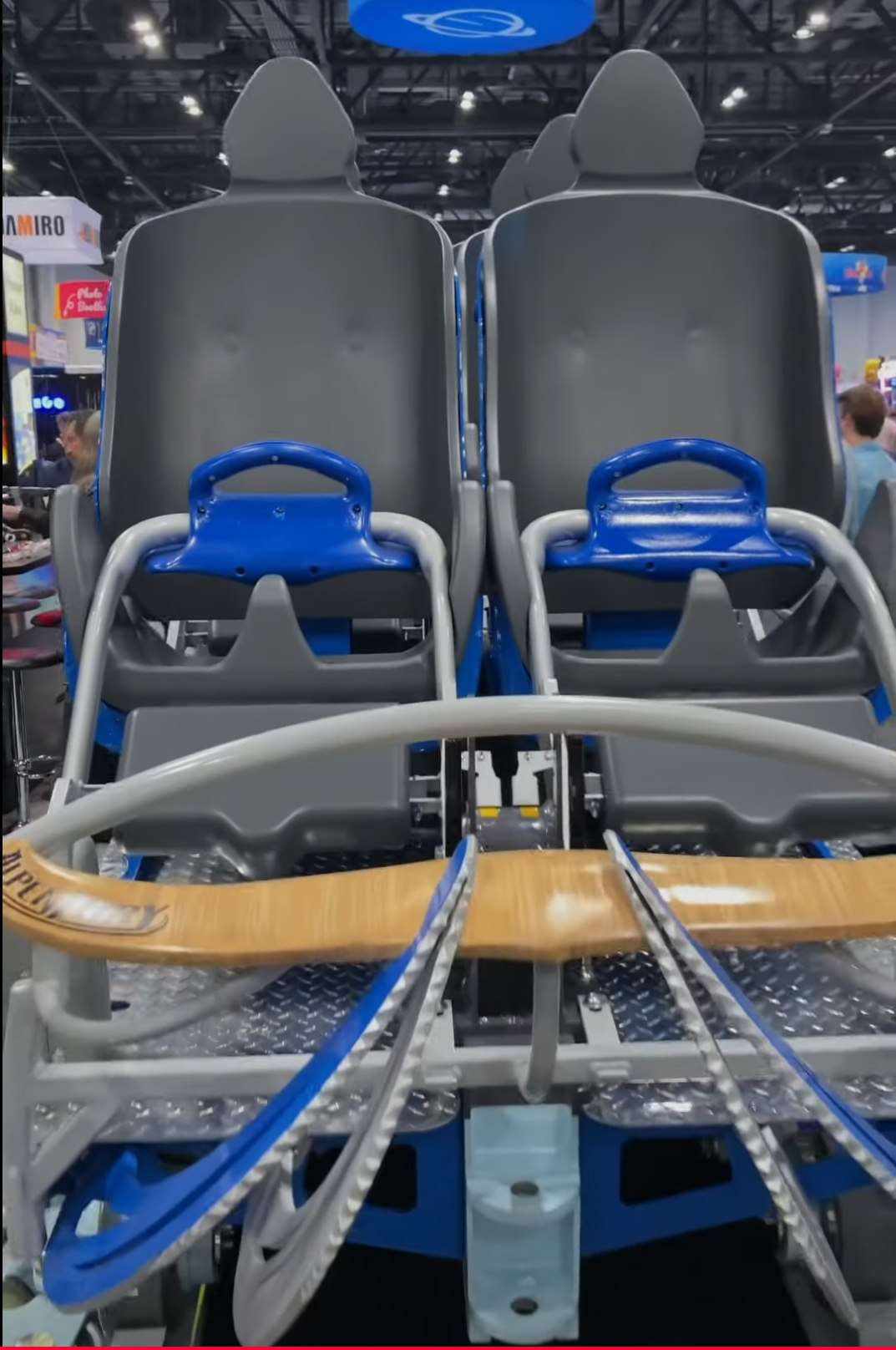
Front row seats of AlpenFury's "ice" train

The ride vehicle for AlpenFury, manufactured by Premier Rides, was showcased at the IAAPA Expo in Orlando, Florida. It has a three-row, two-abreast seating arrangement with high-backed seats and blue hand grips attached to a lap bar restraint system. The seats are grey with a contoured design. The ride operates with two trains, each composed of three cars, with each car featuring three rows of two, allowing for a total capacity of 18 riders per train and 36 riders in total.

The front of the train features a curved guardrail with a wooden accent and a lettering graphic that displays the name of the ride, “AlpenFury.” The flooring on AlpenFury is a checkered metal surface. The wheel assembly is visible beneath the train, a light blue-coloured assembly is visible on both trains, and the overall colour scheme includes grey, blue, and metallic elements. The second train is mostly similar, though the blue accent is swapped with orange, displaying the fire (orange) and ice (blue) aspects of the coaster.

== Reception ==
AlpenFury was ranked the second-best new roller coaster of 2025 by Amusement Today's Golden Ticket Awards.

Golden Ticket Awards: Top steel Roller Coasters
Year									1998	1999
Ranking									–	–
Year	2000	2001	2002	2003	2004	2005	2006	2007	2008	2009
Ranking	–	–	–	–	–	–	–	–	–	–
Year	2010	2011	2012	2013	2014	2015	2016	2017	2018	2019
Ranking	–	–	–	–	–	–	–	–	–	–
Year	2020	2021	2022	2023	2024	2025	2026			
Ranking	N/A	–	–	–	–	–	13			
