= BrainSurge (attraction) =

Mall of America attraction

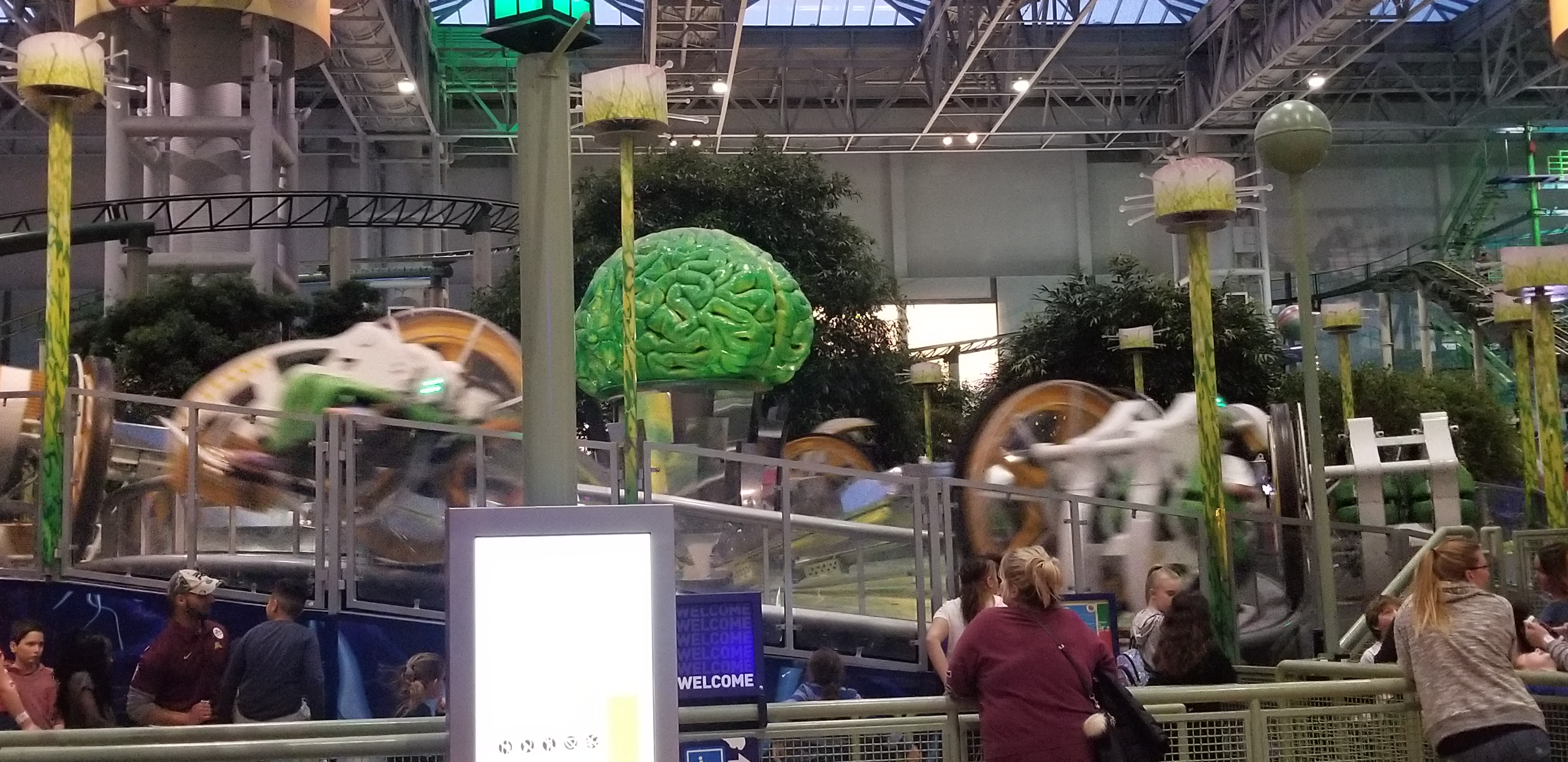
- BrainSurge

Nickelodeon Universe
- Status: Operating
- Opening date: March 20, 2010

Ride statistics
- Attraction type: UniCoaster
- Manufacturer: Chance Morgan
- Designer: US Thrill Rides
- Theme: BrainSurge

BrainSurge is a flat ride located in Nickelodeon Universe amusement park in the Mall of America. It is a first park model of Chance Morgan's "UniCoaster" attraction that is located near the center of the park. The ride is based on the game show of the same name.

On December 21, 2022, US Thrill Rides, the ride's designer, filed for Chapter 11 bankruptcy.

== Description ==
BrainSurge is the first park model of Chance Morgan's UniCoaster flat ride and was unveiled March 20, 2010. It is the first of three UniCoasters built and one of two still in operation, the other being Jimmy Neutron's Atom Smasher at the American Dream mall's Nickelodeon Universe park. The second UniCoaster, dubbed "Octotron" was installed at Belmont Park in San Diego, California has since been removed from the park since December of 2024.

The ride is based on the Nickelodeon television network's game show of the same name and spans 56 meters in diameter. In the center of the machine is a giant model of a brain that glows and flashes. It is in the center of the park near the Avatar Airbender ride. The ride spins at 35 mph (56 km/h) around the brain. In this ride, riders control the orientation of their car.

The ride has eight sweeps radiating from a central column. At the end of each sweep is a two-seat gondola with over-the-shoulder restraints. Sixteen riders per cycle use a lever between the seat pairs to control the forward/backward flipping motion of the individual gondolas as they travel around the track. Ride time is two minutes per cycle.
