= Steel Curtain (roller coaster) =

Roller coaster at Kennywood

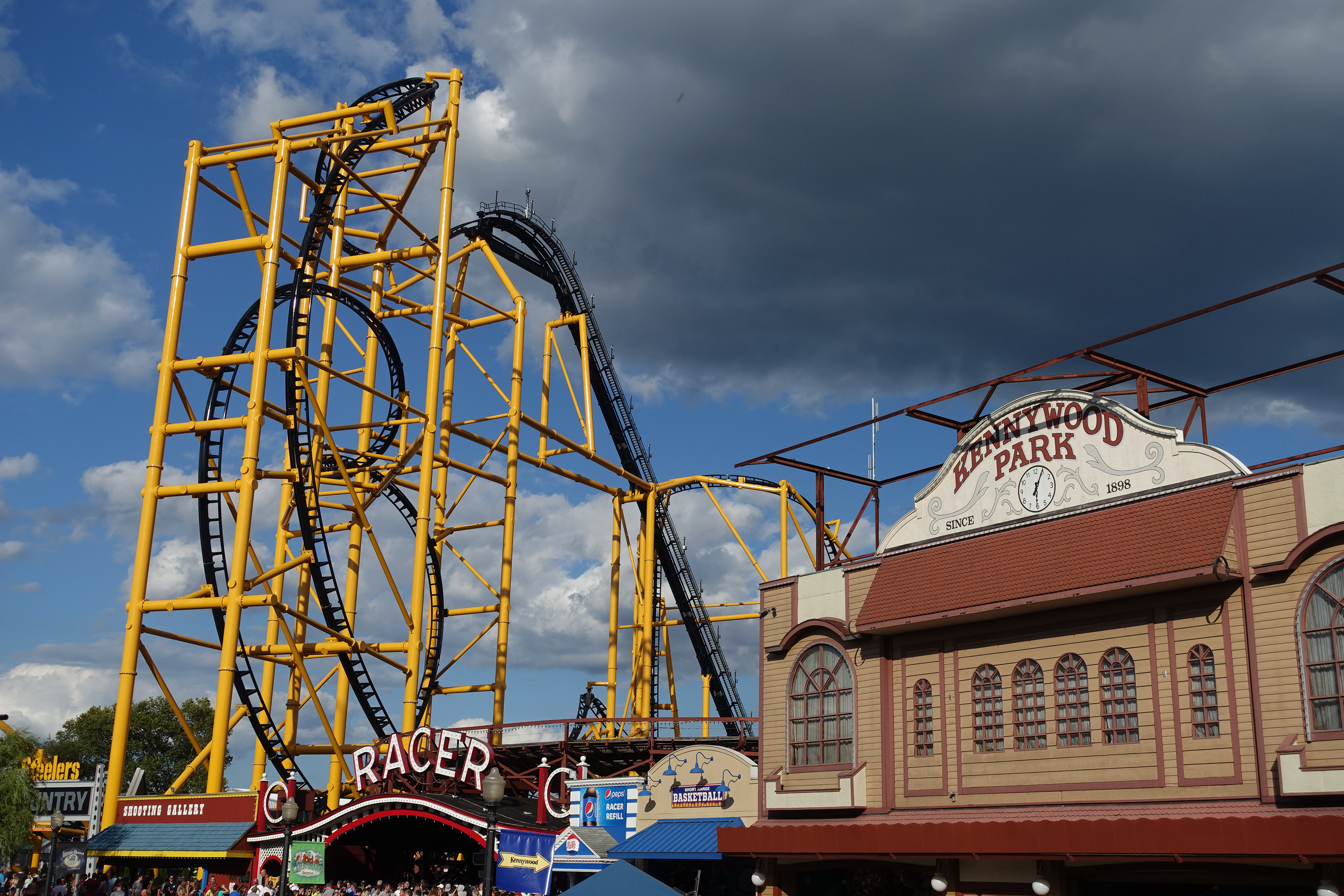

Kennywood
- Location: Kennywood
- Park section: Steelers Country
- Coordinates: 40°23′14″N 79°51′39″W
- Status: Operating
- Soft opening date: July 12, 2019
- Opening date: July 13, 2019
- Replaced: Log Jammer

General statistics
- Type: Steel
- Manufacturer: S&S – Sansei Technologies
- Height: 220 ft (67 m)
- Drop: 205 ft (62 m)
- Length: 4,000 ft (1,200 m)
- Speed: 75 mph (121 km/h)
- Inversions: 8 or 9 (Note: The Roller Coaster DataBase lists the ride as having eight inversions, since the banana roll is counted as one inversion. Other sources list the ride as having nine inversions, with the banana roll counted as two.)
- Duration: 2:00
- Height restriction: 52–77 in (132–196 cm)
- Trains: 2 trains with 6 cars; riders arranged 2 across in 2 rows for a total of 24 riders per train
- Theme: Pittsburgh Steelers
- Steel Curtain at RCDB

Steel Curtain is a steel hypercoaster at Kennywood in West Mifflin, Pennsylvania, United States. Manufactured by S&S – Sansei Technologies, the coaster reaches a height of 220 feet (67 m) and features either eight or nine inversions, including a 197-foot (60 m) corkscrew which was the world's tallest inversion at the time. Themed to the Pittsburgh Steelers NFL football team, the roller coaster is named after the Steel Curtain, the nickname for the Steelers' defensive line during the 1970s.

Steel Curtain is located on the former site of Log Jammer, a flume ride that closed in 2017. The roller coaster was announced in July 2018 following a two-phase teaser campaign dubbed "Project 412" that generated publicity for the ride. The track was topped out in March 2019. After a series of weather-related delays, the ride opened on July 13, 2019. Steel Curtain received Amusement Today magazine's Golden Ticket Award for Best New Roller Coaster in 2019. The ride was closed for repairs during the 2024 season to reinforce the ride's existing support columns and add new supports. It reopened to passholders on May 23, 2025, and to the general public the following day.

== History ==
=== Development ===
Kennywood closed its Log Jammer flume ride in September 2017. Demolition of Log Jammer began in January 2018 to make room for a new attraction which would open the following year. The demolition process was completed that March, and workers started clearing the site and installing caissons for the new attraction. In June 2018, Kennywood announced Project 412, a two-phase teaser campaign for the new ride. During the first phase, a clue was revealed on a virtual scratchcard on Facebook every Thursday. The scratchcard game revealed nine numbers, each of which corresponded to a ride statistic. The second phase, involving an online word search, was launched on July 4, 2018; entrants were asked to look for words corresponding to the nine statistics. The first twelve people to guess all of the words correctly would be invited to the attraction's opening.

Kennywood announced on July 19, 2018, that it would build a steel coaster, Steel Curtain, as part of a new themed area called Steelers Country. The ride would be named after the Steel Curtain, the nickname given to the defensive line of the Pittsburgh Steelers football team from the 1970s. It would be the park's ninth operating roller coaster. Track pieces for Steel Curtain arrived at the park in August 2018. Kennywood drained its lagoon and closed its Paddle Boats attraction so workers could lay the ride's footers. Vertical construction began that November, and the front car of a train was placed on display at the annual International Association of Amusement Parks and Attractions exposition in Orlando, Florida. The first of the ride's inversions, the cutback, was completed the following month. The lift hill was constructed in February 2019, and the tallest point of the ride was topped off the next month. At that time, nearly half of the ride's inversions had been completed.

Though the ride was originally scheduled to open in April 2019, delays in construction and testing pushed the opening to the summer. Many of the delays were attributed to heavy rainfall during 2018. Additionally, the construction cranes that installed the track and supports could not operate if the wind speed was too high. Testing began on June 22, 2019, shortly after the final piece of track was installed on June 18. The ride had to undergo at least 1,000 test runs before it opened to the public. The test runs, which largely used weighted dummies, were intended to simulate a wide range of real-life conditions.

=== Operation ===
Steel Curtain soft opened for the press and coaster enthusiasts on July 12, 2019. Several Steelers players attended the soft opening, including Steelers defensive end Cam Heyward and former players Mike Wagner and John Banaszak. The winners of the Project 412 competition, who came from as far away as California and Texas, were also invited to the ride's soft opening. The ride officially opened to the public one day later on July 13, 2019. A technical issue on opening day, in which one of the trains stopped momentarily while climbing the lift hill, resulted in the closure of the ride for the rest of the day.

On August 3, 2019, Steel Curtain was closed for adjustments, reopening four days later on August 7. In a Facebook post, Kennywood attributed the ride's downtime to the fact that Steel Curtain was a "unique prototype ride". A former president of the American Coaster Enthusiasts (ACE) said that such downtime was common for prototype rides. Steel Curtain did not operate in 2020 due to the COVID-19 pandemic, but it reopened for the 2021 season. The ride closed again for repairs in June 2022, and it reopened the following month on July 14, 2022.

In April 2024, Kennywood announced that Steel Curtain would not operate for the entire 2024 season due to a planned "extensive modification project". The park's assistant general manager, Ricky Spicuzza, stated that the goal of the project is to create a long-term solution that will increase the ride's "reliability and longevity". Following the announcement, a 2024 season pass holder filed a class action lawsuit against Kennywood, alleging that the park withheld news of the closure and used false advertising with the intent to sell more season passes. During the closure, workers installed additional columns to reinforce the ride's structure. Three of the main support columns were refurbished, and newly added columns have more bolts than the original columns. The park later revealed that S&S Worldwide added three columns and additional bracing at various points along the support structure to reduce the amount of back and forth movement the ride was experiencing. The goal was to increase Steel Curtain's reliability and longevity.

Following an inspection and hundreds of test runs in April 2025, Kennywood announced in early May 2025 that the ride would reopen. Steel Curtain reopened on May 24, 2025, having opened to season passholders the previous day. A new logo was also created for the ride to celebrate its anticipated return.

== Characteristics ==
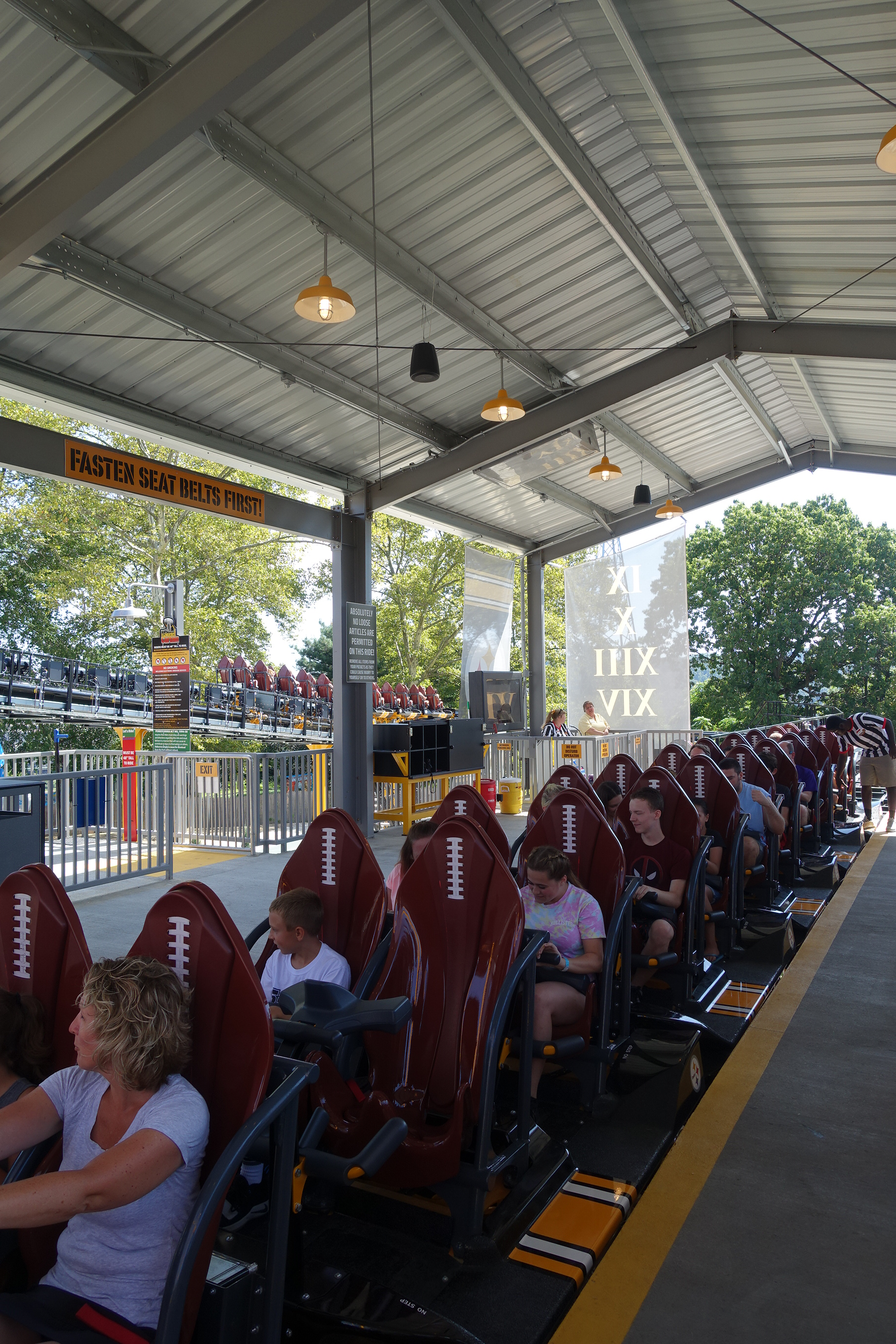
Riders on the trains' football-themed seats

The roller coaster was designed by S&S – Sansei Technologies and, at the time of its opening, was the largest coaster made by S&S. Steel Curtain features eight or nine inversions, depending on how the inversions are counted; it reaches a maximum height of 220 feet (67 m). The ride reaches a maximum speed of 75 mph (121 km/h) and lasts two minutes, although a large portion of that duration is spent on the lift hill. When it opened, Steel Curtain featured the tallest inversion in the world: a dive drop measuring 197 feet (60 m) high. Steel Curtain held this record until the opening of Spitfire at Six Flags Qiddiya City on December 31, 2025; it retains the United States inversion height record as of 2026. It is also the tallest roller coaster in Pennsylvania, and it has more inversions than any other coaster in the United States. It ties the record for most inversions in North America with AlpenFury. Steel Curtain is located within Kennywood's 3-acre (1.2 ha) Steelers Country area, which, according to the Pittsburgh Post-Gazette, was "believed to be the first pro sports team tie-in at an amusement park".

Steel Curtain's construction required 152 concrete footers, 113 pieces of track that weighed 12,000 pounds (5,400 kg) each, and over 21,000 bolts. The track pieces are colored black, while the support beams are yellow, representing the colors of the Pittsburgh Steelers. The majority of the ride's pieces were manufactured in the United States, although some pieces had to be imported from elsewhere. The largest track piece weighed 15,000 pounds (6,800 kg). In addition, the support structure consists of 1,162 pieces, which weigh up to 12,226 pounds (5,546 kg). The pieces weigh a total of 2.67 million pounds (1,340 short tons; 1,210 t), while the concrete footers weigh 8.37 million pounds (4,180 short tons; 3,800 t). The ride's exit is through a gift shop within a building that contains the Steelers Experience, which includes various football-themed activities.

Steel Curtain has two trains, where riders are seated two across in each row with two rows per car. Both trains contain six cars for a total of 24 riders per train. The restraint system consists of lap bars and a seatbelt. Each train is painted black with yellow, matching the colors of the track and supports, with white stripes to resemble a Pittsburgh Steelers jersey. The seats are designed to resemble a football. The front car of one train has the number 19 painted on it, while the front car of the other train has the number 33. These numbers represent 1933, the year that the Pittsburgh Steelers were founded.

== Ride experience ==
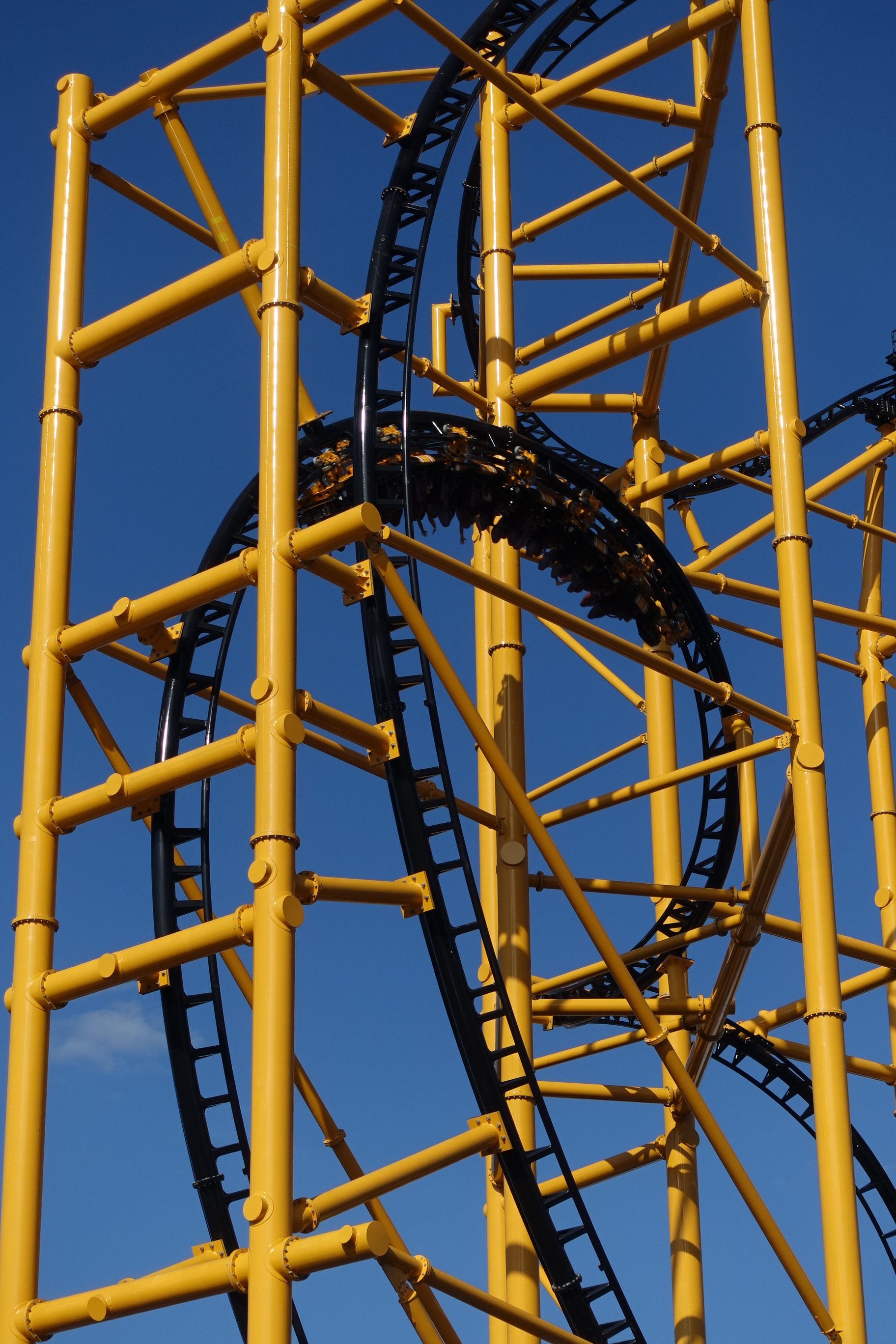
Drachen Fire Dive Drop and sea serpent

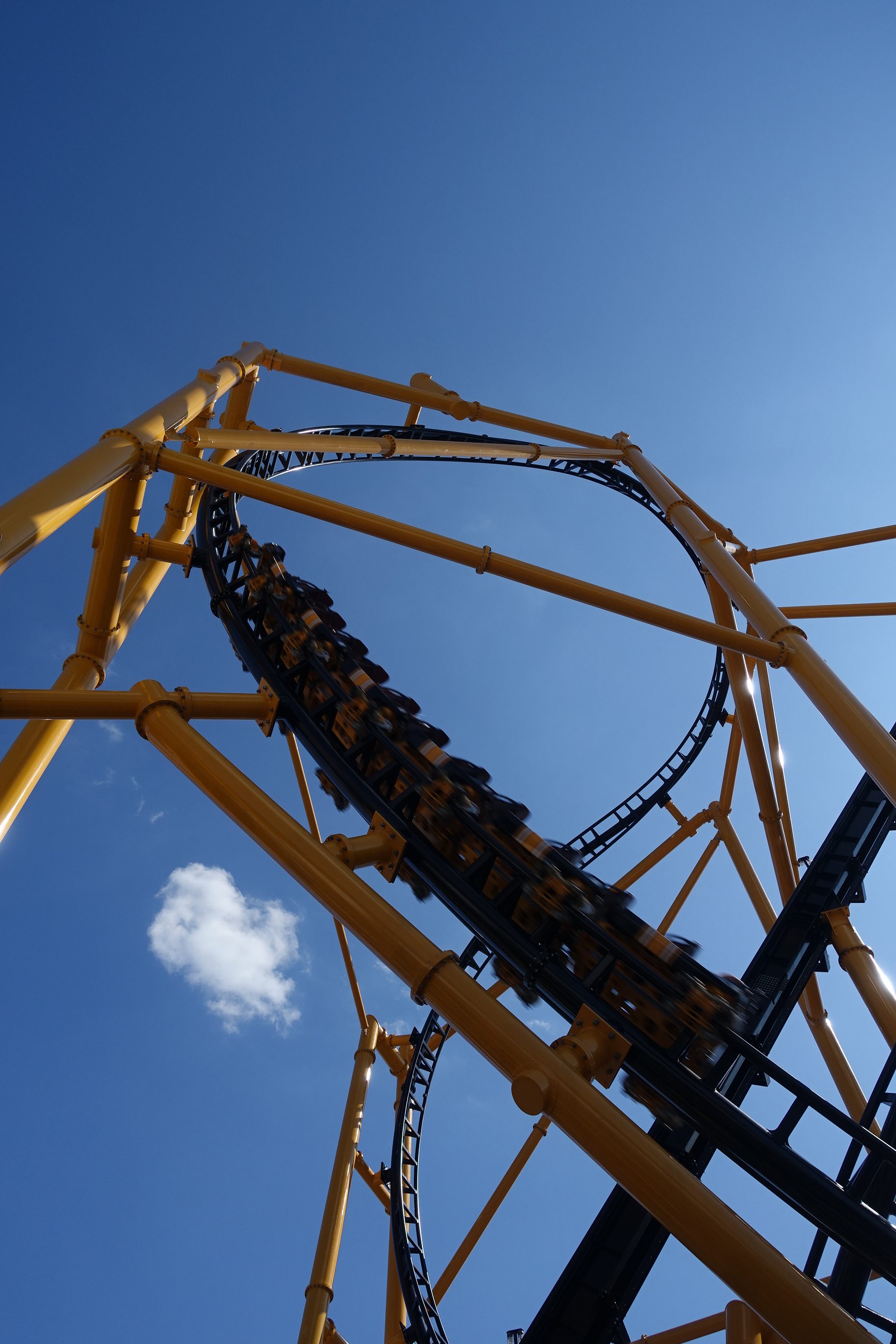
Banana roll inversion

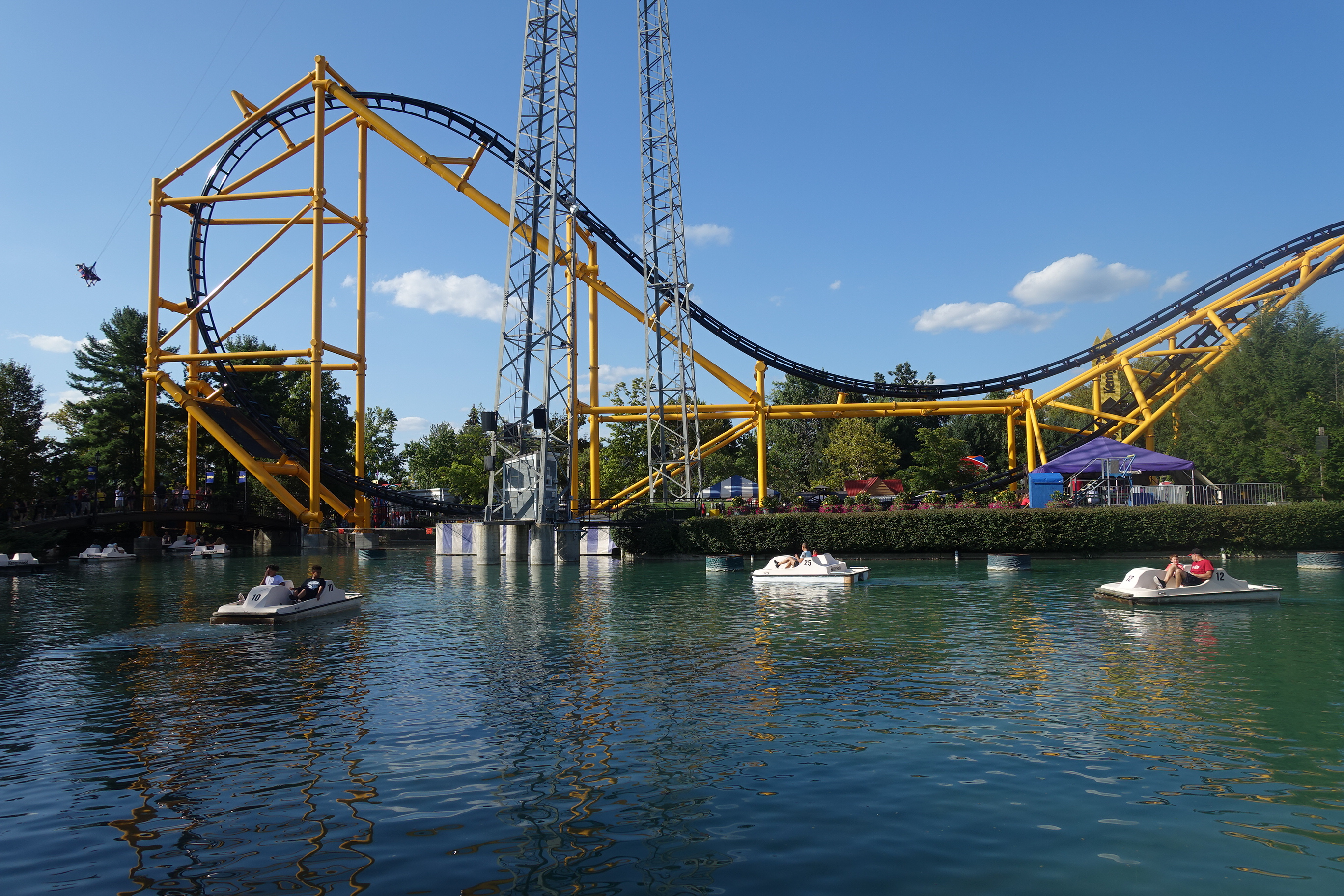
Dive loop

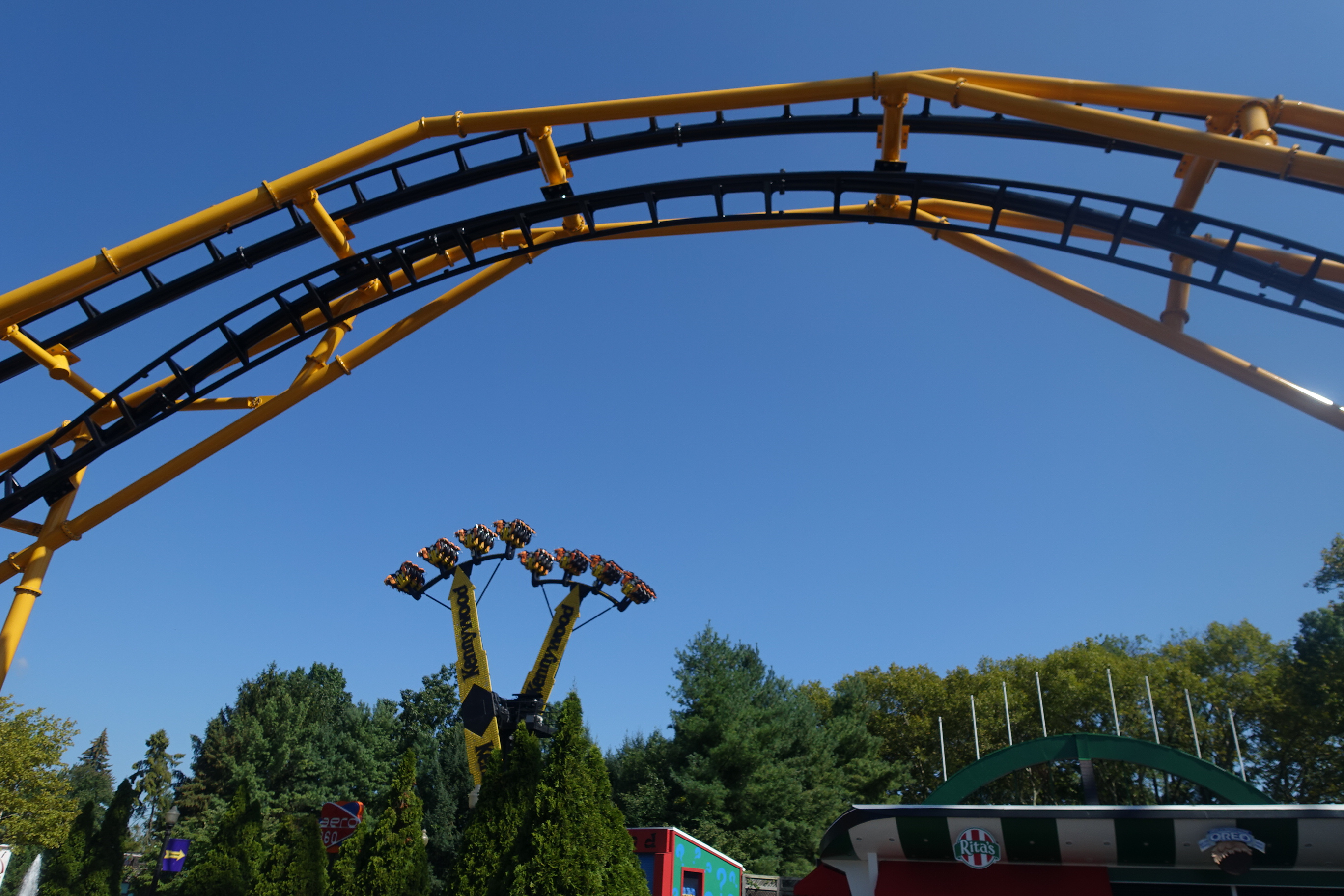
Zero-g stall

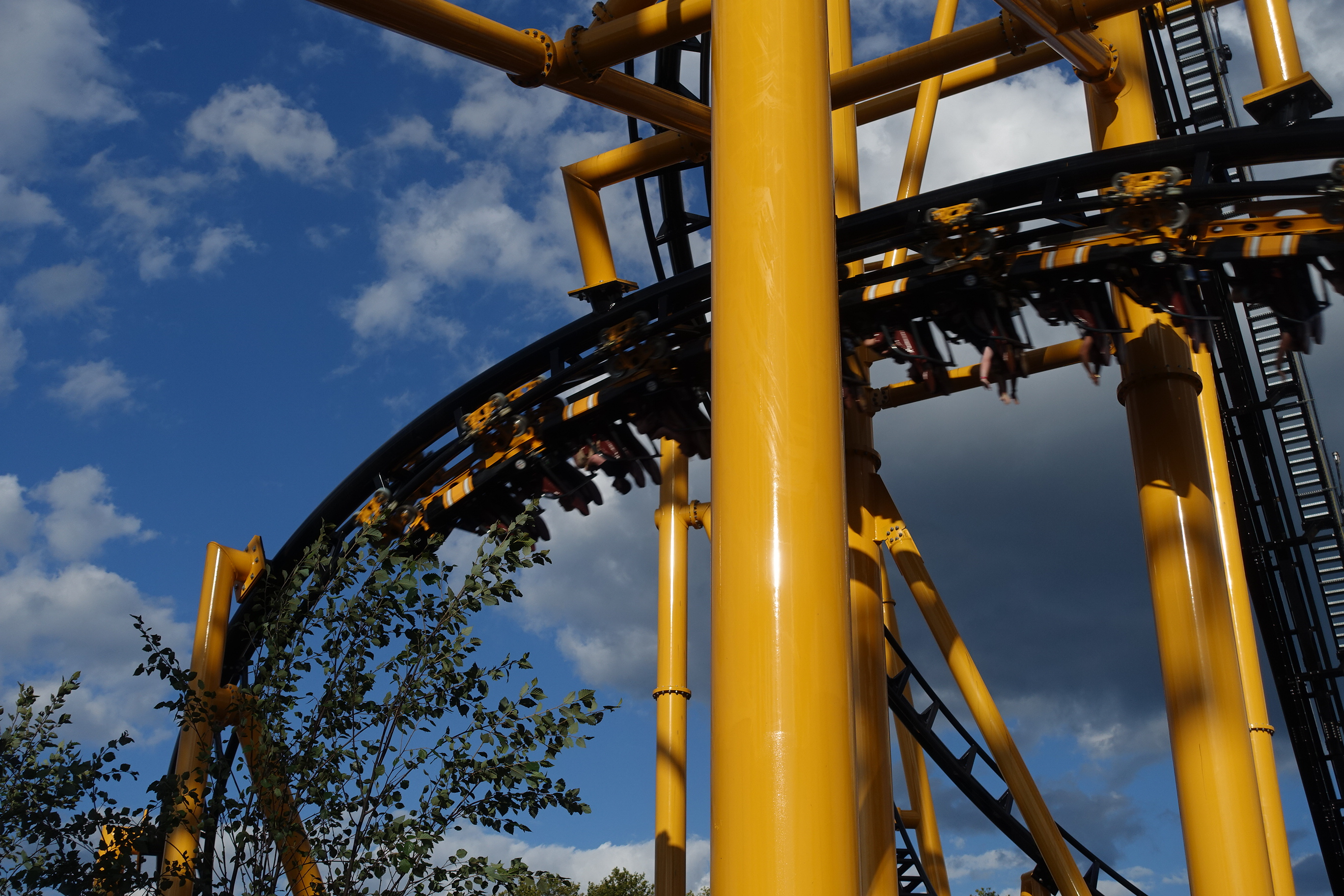
Cutback, below the corkscrew

Immediately after leaving the station, the train climbs a 220-foot-tall (67 m) lift hill, which is angled 50 degrees off the ground. The ascent up the hill is typically accompanied by the Styx song "Renegade". The lift hill uses a variable speed drive. The train climbs most of the lift hill relatively slowly, speeding up near the top after it has passed several sensors. After cresting the hill, it dips slightly and veers left into the United States' tallest inversion, a 197-foot (60 m) "Drachen Fire Dive Drop" (named for the defunct Drachen Fire). The train drops 205 feet (62 m) out of the inversion. It then banks sharply left, reaching a point close to the ground and traveling back toward the station. It veers left again and enters a banana roll, an element named after its characteristic shape, which raises the train to its second-highest point off the ground.

Riders descend low to the ground once more into a small airtime hill heading back toward the first drop, entering a sea serpent element with two more inversions. This is followed by an airtime hill and the coaster's sixth inversion, a dive loop that turns the train 180 degrees and sends it back toward the station. After a brief straightaway, riders experience a weightlessness maneuver in a zero-g stall inversion. This inversion travels over Kennywood's lagoon, part of the park's National Historic Landmark designation. The coaster's finale follows, with the train entering a corkscrew and cutback in short succession, completing the last two inversions. The cutback ends with a slight jump up onto the final brake run, where the train makes its way back into the station.

== Reception ==
At a preview event for the ride in 2019, Cam Heyward of the Pittsburgh Steelers said: "You just want to be a part of something like this and to be a Steeler ride inside Pittsburgh it's just unbelievable." A reporter for WGN-TV wrote: "What's really special about this coaster is how they were able to fit a ride that takes you upside down so many times into this space. The ride goes back and forth through itself so many times. It's remarkable." Arthur Levine of USA Today wrote: "Except for one brief pop out of my seat, there were scarcely any negative-G sensations. This is a thrill machine designed for intense speed, tight turns and inversions."

=== Awards ===
Amusement Today's annual Golden Ticket Awards awarded Steel Curtain the title of Best New Roller Coaster of 2019.

Golden Ticket Awards: Top steel Roller Coasters
Year									1998	1999
Ranking									–	–
Year	2000	2001	2002	2003	2004	2005	2006	2007	2008	2009
Ranking	–	–	–	–	–	–	–	–	–	–
Year	2010	2011	2012	2013	2014	2015	2016	2017	2018	2019
Ranking	–	–	–	–	–	–	–	–	–	42
Year	2020	2021	2022	2023	2024	2025	2026			
Ranking	N/A	23 (tie)	35	36	–	–	–			

== See also ==
- 2019 in amusement parks

== Notes ==
Preceded by Falcon	World's tallest roller coaster inversion July 2019 – December 2025	Succeeded by Spitfire (roller coaster)
