= Steel Curtain =

Group of defensive American football players

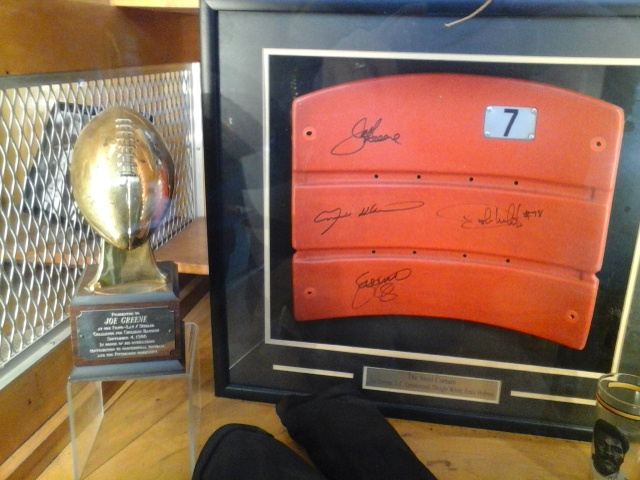
Signatures of Steel Curtain members on a seat from Three Rivers Stadium

The Steel Curtain was the nickname, first for the defensive line, but soon for the entire defensive unit of the 1970s Pittsburgh Steelers football team of the National Football League (NFL). The line was the backbone of the Steelers dynasty, which won four Super Bowls (IX, X, XIII, and XIV) in six years.

The Steelers began their 1976 season 1–4 and lost their quarterback, Terry Bradshaw. For the nine games remaining in the season, the Steelers recorded five shutouts (three of them uninterrupted), and only allowed two touchdowns (both in a single game), and five field goals. The defense allowed an average 3.1 points per game and the team had an average margin of victory of 22 points. Eight of the Steelers' starting eleven defensive players were selected for the Pro Bowl that year, and four would be selected to the Hall of Fame.

== Lineup ==
The Steel Curtain, running with a 4–3 defense, included:

- No. 75 "Mean" Joe Greene – defensive tackle 1969–1981, 4-time Super Bowl champion (IX, X, XIII, XIV), 10-time Pro Bowl selection (1969–1976, 1978, 1979), 2-time NFL Defensive Player of the Year (1972, 1974), NFL 1970s All-Decade Team, Pro Football Hall of Fame, Pittsburgh Steelers All-Time Team, NFL 100 All-Time Team, number 75 officially retired
- No. 68 "Hollywood Bags" L. C. Greenwood – defensive end 1969–1981, 4-time Super Bowl champion (IX, X, XIII, XIV), 6-time Pro Bowl (1973–1976, 1978, 1979), NFL 1970s All-Decade Team, Pittsburgh Steelers All-Time Team
- No. 63 "Fats" Ernie Holmes – defensive tackle 1972–1977, 2-time Super Bowl champion (IX, X)
- No. 78 "Mad Dog" Dwight White – defensive end 1971–1980, 4-time Super Bowl champion (IX, X, XIII, XIV), 2-time Pro Bowl (1972, 1973), Pittsburgh Steelers All-Time Team

All four men were African American and played at little-known Southern colleges and/or HBCU's that were overlooked by most other NFL teams during the waning days of the civil rights movement. While Greene was personally recruited by head coach Chuck Noll as his first draft pick with the Steelers, the other three were spotted by sportswriter and later scout Bill Nunn, who had many deep connections to HBCU's. All four appeared on the cover of the December 8, 1975 issue of Time as a result of both the Steel Curtain's dominance as well as their racial significance.

The four would remain together as the starting defensive line until 1978, when Holmes would be traded to the Tampa Bay Buccaneers (replaced by longtime backup Steve Furness) while the slightly younger John Banaszak replaced White in the starting lineup. All except Greenwood (and including Furness and Banaszak) would be gone by the end of the 1981 season, after which the Steelers would switch to the 3–4 defense; Greenwood--already 35 and unable to make the adjustment to the 3–4 (which replaced one of the defensive tackle positions with a 2nd middle linebacker)--would be cut two weeks prior to the 1982 season and retire, ending the days of the Steel Curtain. The Steelers continue to use the 3–4 as their base defense today.

Greene is the only surviving member of the line, with the deaths of Holmes and White in 2008 and Greenwood in 2013.

== Origin of the legacy name ==
The nickname "Steel Curtain", a play on the phrase "Iron Curtain" popularized by former British Prime Minister Winston Churchill, originated in a 1971 contest sponsored by Pittsburgh radio station WTAE to name the defense. The name was also a play on Pittsburgh's reputation for steel production. The contest was won by Gregory Kronz, a ninth grader at a suburban high school. According to the Pittsburgh Post-Gazette, "he was just one of 17 people who submitted the 'Steel Curtain' moniker to the WTAE contest, necessitating a drawing for the grand prize," which Kronz won. The term has also been used to refer to their defense as a whole during that time. The name is still used to reference the defense occasionally today, interchangeably with the Blitzburgh name that became popular in the 1990s behind the zone blitz schemes of Hall of Fame defensive coordinator Dick LeBeau; the Steelers current defense resembles Blitzburgh more than the Steel Curtain days.

== Namesakes ==
The Steel Curtain roller coaster at Kennywood, which opened in 2019, was named after the Steelers' defensive line.
