= Skycoaster =

Amusement park ride

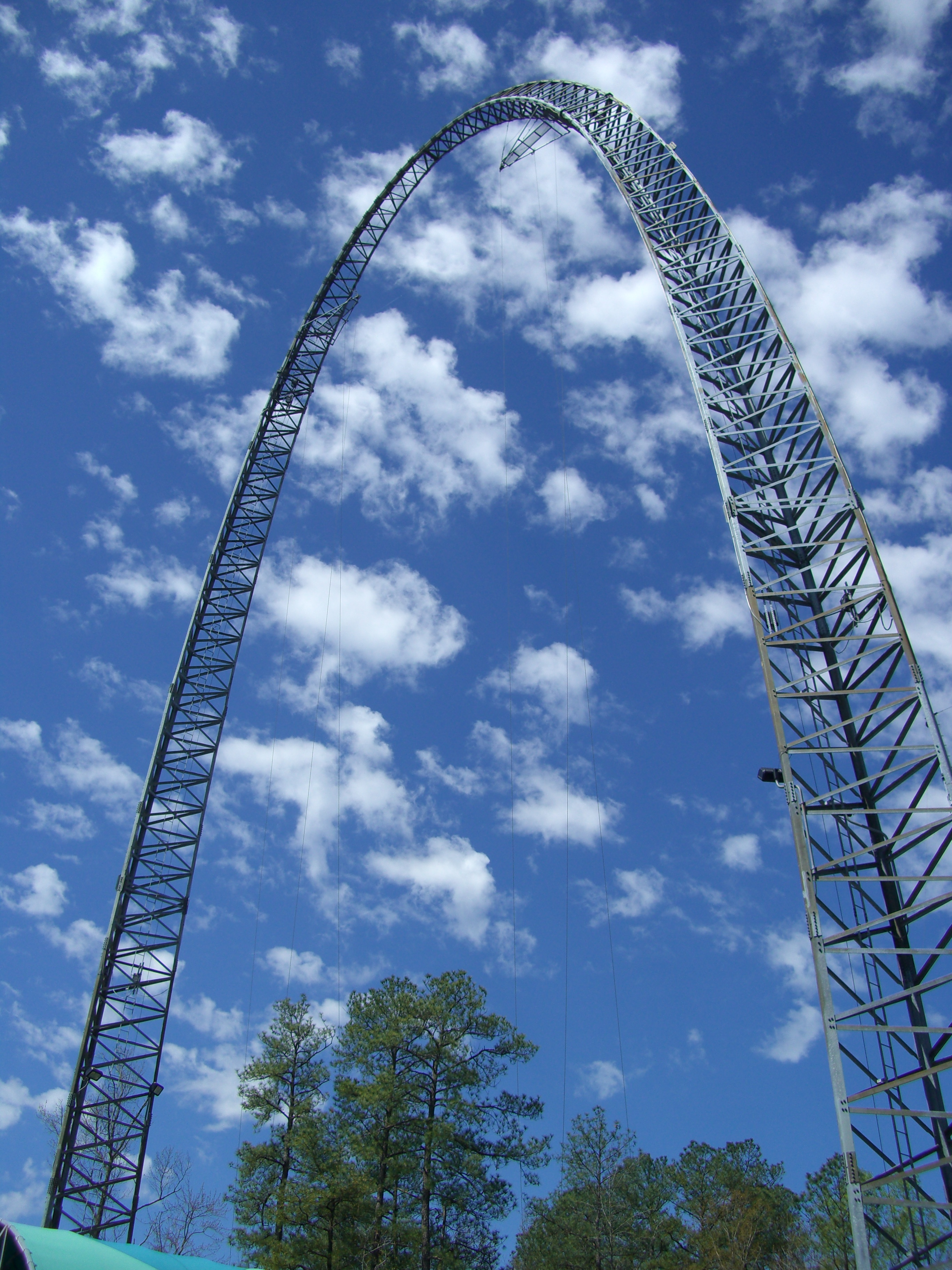
- A typical Skycoaster arch tower

Ride statistics
- Manufacturer: Ride Entertainment Group
- Designer: William Kitchen & Ken Bird
- Model: Single swing Dual swing
- Height: 100 ft – 300 ft

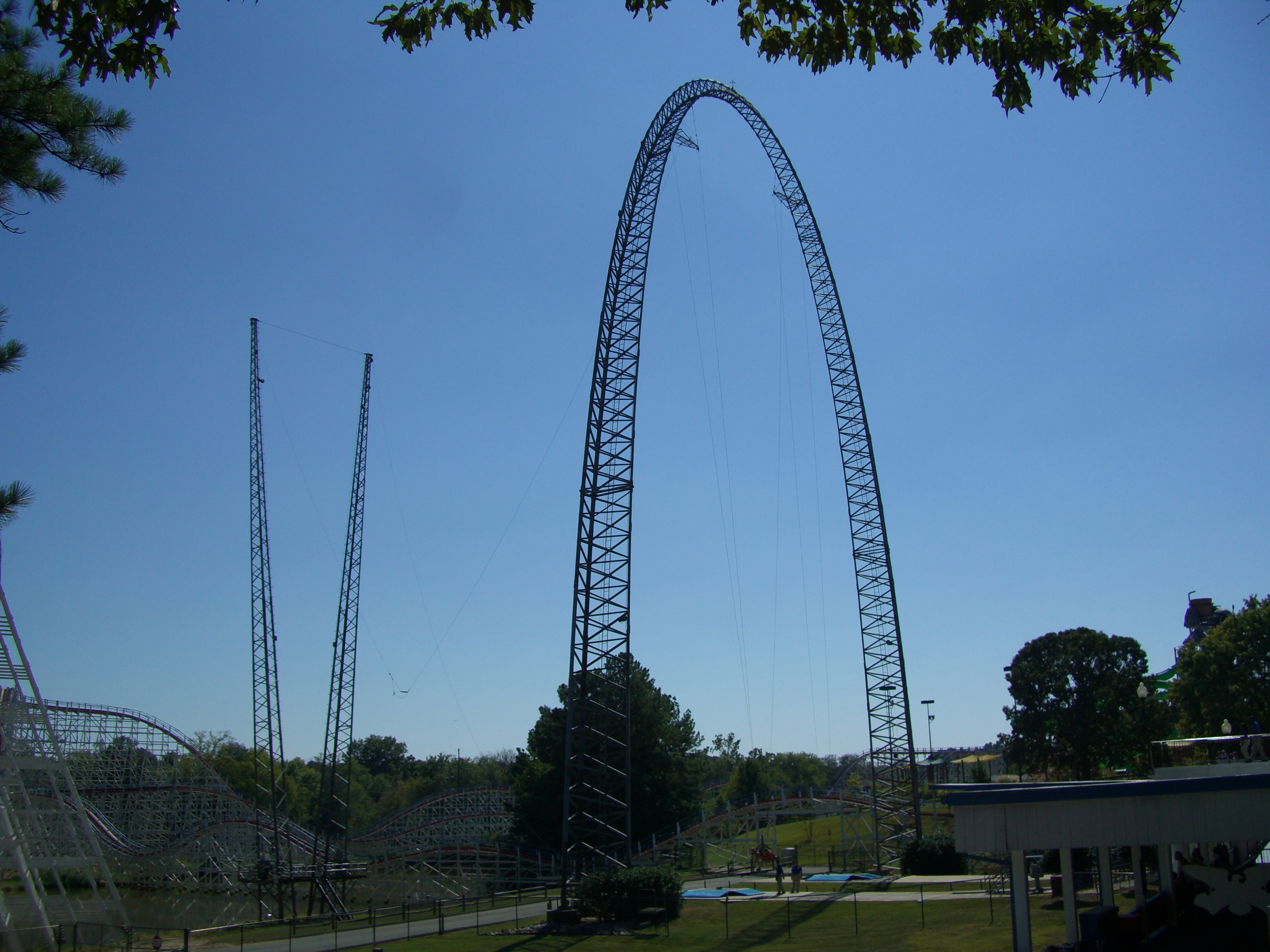
A typical Skycoaster's entire structure, including the lifting towers and the main arch

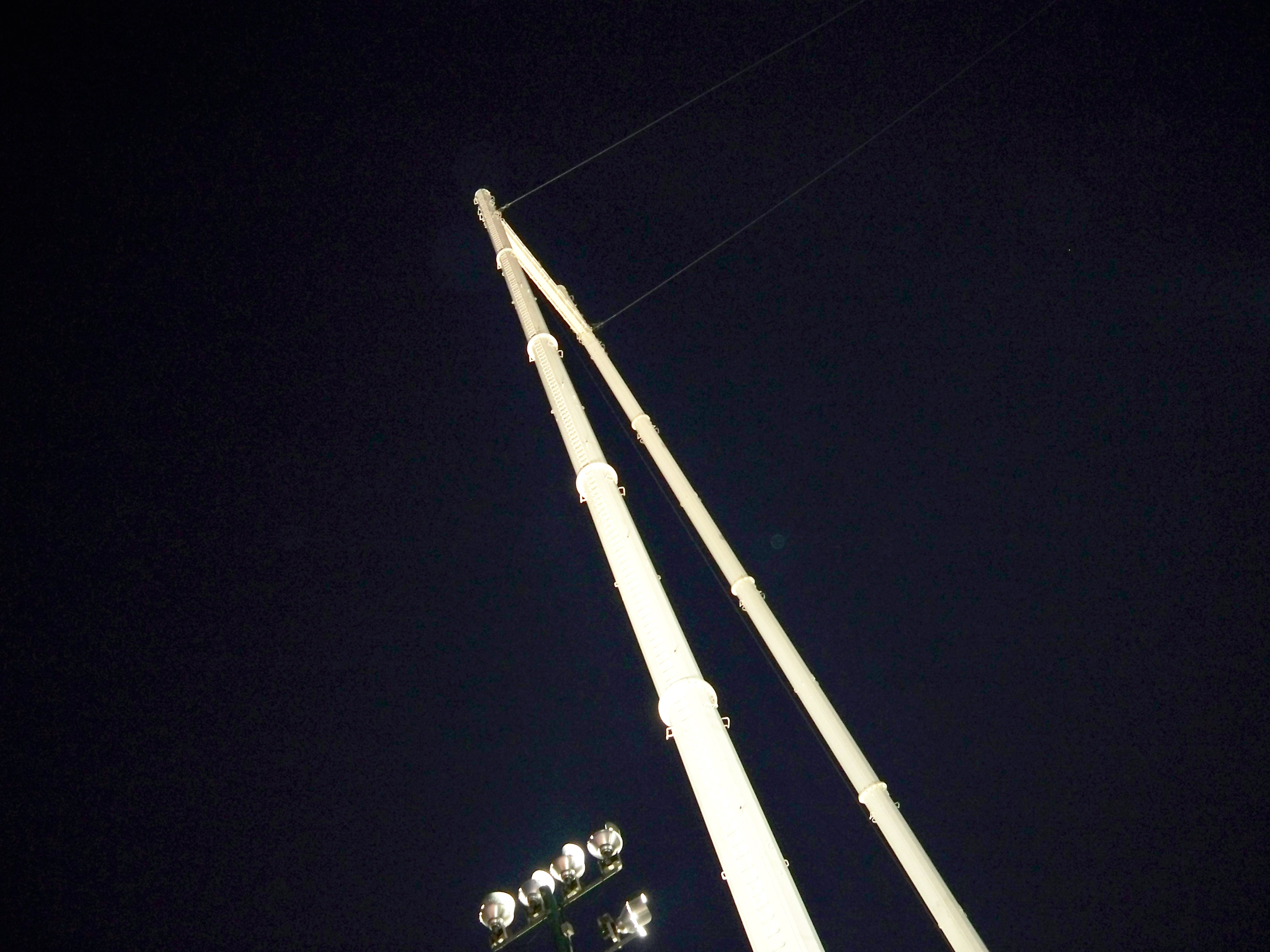
The A-frame tower of the world's tallest SkyCoaster in Kissimmee, Florida

Skycoaster is the name of a free-fall and flight-simulating amusement park attraction produced and managed by Skycoaster Company, LLC.. On the Skycoaster, riders in groups of 1 to 3 are harnessed in specialized hang gliding suits referred to as "Flight Suits" (in a face-down, prone position), and are winched to the top of a launch tower; the riders then pull a ripcord to engage their “flight”, upon which they swing several times from a cable tether, back and forth, until finally brought to a rest. The attraction is often compared to a combination of skydiving, bungee jumping, and hang gliding.

There are currently over 80 Skycoasters in operation all around the world, ranging in heights from 30–91 metres (100–300 ft). The ride can be found on every continent but Antarctica. Most locations operate as upcharge attractions with an additional fare charged to riders who have already paid general admission to the park.

Many installations use a variation of the "Skycoaster" model name, whereas others use a custom name like Dare Devil Dive or Xtreme Skyflyer (both found at several Six Flags parks).

== History ==
William Kitchen, founder of Sky Fun 1 Inc., and Ken Bird originally came up with the idea of the Skycoaster in 1992. They wanted to find a way to let others experience the thrill of jumping out of a plane or the thrills of bungee jumping, but with the safety factor of a merry-go-round. By January 1994, there were four portable models of the ride and 16 permanent fixtures in the United States.

In 1998, Kitchen sold his patents for Skycoaster and most of the Sky Fun 1 Inc. company to ThrillTime Entertainment International Inc. for $12 million. Skycoaster, Inc. was then sold to the Ride Entertainment Group in 2005.

Ride Entertainment introduced Sky Sled in 2017, a new method of riding a Skycoaster. The Sky Sled replaces the prone flying position with a sitting one. It was first introduced in 2018 at Fun Spot America in Kissimmee, Florida.

Ride Entertainment has partnered with KCL Engineering to offer lighting systems for the Skycoasters and Kool Replay to offer automated video systems.

== Production ==
The company is based in Stevensville, Maryland. Parts are manufactured throughout the United States, with the attractions assembled on site.

The two most common types of Skycoasters are lattice and monopole. Lattice Skycoasters were manufactured in a variety of sizes, but the 53-meter (173 ft) dual arch and 31-meter (100 foot) single arch were the most common. Monopole Skycoasters were manufactured in a variety of sizes, 31-meter (100-foot) single or dual, 56-meter (180-foot) single or dual, and one 91-meter (300-foot) unit. Earlier Skycoasters have some unique tower structures that do not fall within these categories.

Flight cables are made of 8 millimetres (5/16 in) galvanized steel, which supports 4,445 kilograms (9,800 lb), or stainless steel, which supports 4,082 kilograms (9,000 lb). However, the maximum weight for a flight is 386 kilograms (850 lb), mainly due to the winch. The 3-ring release system used on the Skycoaster is the same kind used on parachutes. The flight suits worn are similar to hang gliding suits, and are made by a parachute company to support weight of up to 4,535 kilograms (10,000 lb).

There are two types of Skycoaster loading systems:

- Rolling boarding platform: A cart is rolled out to and from the loading area in order to help the flyers on and off the ride.
- Scissors lift: An elevator-like platform is raised up and down to allow flyers on and off the ride.

== Skycoaster installations ==
Skycoaster name	Park	Location	Height	Opened	Closed	Details
Skycoaster	Fun Spot America - Kissimmee	Kissimmee, Florida	91 metres (300 ft)	1997	Open	World's tallest Skycoaster. Opened on Saturday, November 22, 1997, with an appearance by 82-year-old George A. Blair.
Sydney Skycoaster	Raging Waters Sydney (Formerly Wet'n'Wild Sydney)	Sydney, Australia	77 metres (251 ft)	2013	Open	World's second tallest Skycoaster. Dual Skycoaster and the first with a new design with less steel than other Skycoaster designs. Second Skycoaster with the Village Roadshow group.
Skycoaster	Fun Spot America - Orlando	Orlando, Florida	76 metres (250 ft)	2013	Open	Relocated from MGM Grand Adventures Theme Park. Only uses one of two former towers.
Sky Screamer	MGM Grand Adventures	Las Vegas	76 metres (250 ft)	1996	2001	Relocated to Fun Spot Orlando. After closing to the public, the ride was originally retained on property and available for rent by companies.
VertigoXtremo	Parque de la Costa	Tigre, Buenos Aires, Argentina	65 metres (213 ft)	1999	Opened	
Skycoaster	Skyborne	London	61 metres (200 ft)		Open	
Skycoaster	The American Adventure	Ilkeston, Derbyshire	61 metres (200 ft)		Closed	
X-Flight	Six Flags Mexico	Mexico, Mexico City	60 metres (197 ft)	2015	Open	Tallest Skycoaster in Mexico at over 55 metres (180 ft) tall.
Skycoaster	PlayCenter	São Paulo	60 metres (197 ft)		Closed	
RipCord	Worlds of Fun	Kansas City, Missouri	58 metres (189 ft)	1996	Open	
Caribbean Swing	Hurricane Harbor	Arlington, Texas	58 metres (189 ft)	1995	2014	
Skycoaster	Kennywood	West Mifflin, Pennsylvania	58 metres (189 ft)	1994	2019	Single Lattice A-Frame. First permanent Skycoaster installation in an amusement park.
SkyCoaster	State Fair of Texas	Dallas	58 metres (189 ft)		Closed	
RipCord	Michigan's Adventure	Muskegon, Michigan	56 metres (183 ft)	2002	Open	
SkyCoaster	Schlitterbahn Waterpark Resort	New Braunfels, Texas	56 metres (183 ft)	2002	closed	
Skycoaster	Lake Compounce	Bristol, Connecticut	58 metres (189 ft)	1998	Open	
RipCord	Valleyfair	Shakopee, Minnesota	55 metres (180 ft)	1996	2024	
Geronimo Skycoaster	Wild Adventures	Valdosta, Georgia	55 metres (180 ft)	1999	Open	
Skycoaster	Six Flags Darien Lake	Darien, New York	55 metres (180 ft)	1995	Open	Opened as "Skycoaster".
Sky Coaster	Six Flags Over Georgia	Austell, Georgia	55 metres (180 ft)	1996	2024	
Ultimate Rush	Grand Adventure Land	Reno, Nevada	55 metres (180 ft)	1998	Open	
Unknown	United Entertainment & Tourism Company	Shaab Park, Kuwait	55 metres (180 ft)		Open	
Skycoaster	Kentucky Kingdom	Louisville, Kentucky	55 metres (180 ft)	2001	2009	
Screamin' Skycoaster	Six Flags Fiesta Texas	San Antonio	55 metres (180 ft)	1995	2001	Relocated to Texas State Fair.
Skycoaster	Six Flags New Orleans	New Orleans	55 metres (180 ft)	2000	2005	It was flooded by Hurricane Katrina in 2005. After 20 years, it was demolished in 2025.
Skydiver	Walibi Holland	Biddinghuizen, Netherlands	54 metres (177 ft)	2002	Open	
Dare Devil Dive	Six Flags Great Escape and Hurricane Harbor	Queensbury, New York	53 metres (175 ft)	2001	Open	
Hadikali	Hopi Hari	Vinhedo, São Paulo, Brazil	53 metres (174 ft)		Open	
Catapulte	La Ronde	Montreal, Quebec, Canada	53 metres (173 ft)	2008	open	
Skycoaster	Opryland USA	Nashville, Tennessee	53 metres (173 ft)	1995	1997	Originally opened in park's State Fair area before being relocated within park for 1997 season. Park was closed and demolished following 1997 season.
Xtreme SkyFlyer	Canada's Wonderland	Vaughan, Ontario, Canada	53 metres (173 ft)	1996	2023	Dual Skycoaster.
SKY-X	Seoul Land	Gwacheon, South Korea	50 metres (165 ft)	2000	Open	
Sky Coaster	Superland	Rishon LeZion, Israel	50 metres (165 ft)	1998	Open	
SkyCoaster	Wet'n'Wild Gold Coast	Gold Coast, Australia	50 metres (164 ft)		Closed	
XLR8R	Elitch Gardens	Denver	49 metres (160 ft)	1996	Open	
Xtreme Skyflyer	Kings Island	Mason, Ohio	47 metres (153 ft)	1995	2024	Opened as "Drop Zone", named after Paramount movie Drop Zone. Renamed in 1996 to "Xtreme Skyflyer".
Dive Devil	Six Flags Magic Mountain	Valencia, California	47 metres (153 ft)	1996	Open	
Xtreme SkyFlyer	Kings Dominion	Doswell, Virginia	47 metres (153 ft)	1996	2025	
RipCord	Carowinds	Charlotte, North Carolina	47 metres (153 ft)	1995	Open	Opened as "Skycoaster". Renamed in 1996 to "Xtreme Skyflyer". Relocated next to Nighthawk in 2014.
Xtreme SkyFlyer	California's Great America	Santa Clara, California	47 metres (153 ft)	1997	Open	
Dare Devil Dive	Six Flags Great Adventure	Jackson, New Jersey	47 metres (153 ft)	1997	2024	
Dive Bomber Alley	Six Flags Over Texas	Arlington, Texas	47 metres (153 ft)	1996	Open	
Dragon's Wing	Six Flags St. Louis	Eureka, Missouri	46 metres (152 ft)	1996	2023	
Barnstormer	Six Flags AstroWorld	Houston	46 metres (151 ft)	1997	2005	
Sky Coaster	Lagoon Amusement Park	Farmington, Utah	44 metres (143 ft)	1995	Open	
Vertigo	Oakwood Theme Park	Pembrokeshire, Wales	43 metres (140 ft)	1997	2024	
I-5 Sky Dive	Wild Waves Theme Park	Federal Way, Washington	38 metres (125 ft)	1998	Open	
Dare Devil Dive	Six Flags Great America	Gurnee, Illinois	38 metres (125 ft)	1997	2023	
Skycoaster	Wet 'n Wild Emerald Pointe	Greensboro, North Carolina	38 metres (125 ft)		Closed	
Professor Delbert's Frontier Fling	Cedar Point	Sandusky, Ohio	47 metres (153 ft)	1996	2024	Originally opened as "Ripcord" in Cedar Point's Challenge Park. Relocated in 2017 to Frontier Trail and renamed.
Skycoaster	South Pier, Blackpool	Blackpool	37 metres (120 ft)	1994	Open	
Skycoaster	Six Flags America	Prince George's County, Maryland	30 metres (100 ft)	2001	2018	Removed to make way for Harley Quinn Spinsanity.
Sky Shark	Magic Springs and Crystal Falls	Hot Springs, Arkansas	35 metres (115 ft)	2014	Open	
Geronimo Skycoaster	Frontier City	Oklahoma City	34 metres (113 ft)	1995	2021	
Dive Devil	Bell's Amusement Park	Tulsa, Oklahoma	34 metres (113 ft)		Closed	
Skycoaster	The Track Family Fun Center	Gulf Shores, Alabama	34 metres (110 ft)	1995	Open	
Skycoaster	Zero Gravity	Dallas	34 metres (110 ft)	1994	2021	
Sky Coaster	Indiana Beach	Monticello, Indiana	34 metres (110 ft)	1995	Open	
Skycoaster	Big Kahuna's	Destin, Florida	34 metres (110 ft)	1993	Open	
Skycoaster	Tusenfryd	Oslo, Norway	34 metres (110 ft)	1996	Open	
Skycoaster	Parque Mundo Aventura	Bogotá D.C., Colombia	34 metres (110 ft)		Open	
Skycoaster	Six Flags New England	Agawam, Massachusetts	34 metres (110 ft)	1995	2013	Formerly known as "Taz's Daredevil Dive". Featured a unique curved tower. Replaced with Star Flyer.
Sky Coaster	Funtown Pier	Seaside Heights, New Jersey	34 metres (110 ft)	2007	2012	Demolished after Hurricane Sandy destroyed most of the pier.
Boardwalk Flight	Luna Park, Coney Island	Coney Island, New York	34 metres (110 ft)	2012	2014	
Skycoaster	Casino Pier	Seaside Heights, New Jersey	33 metres (109 ft)	2015	Open	
The Skycoaster	El Rollo Waterpark	Acapulco, Mexico	33 metres (109 ft)	2015	Closed	33 metres (109 ft) single tower.
Skycoaster	Broadway Grand Prix	Myrtle Beach, South Carolina	30 metres (100 ft)	1996	Open	
Skycoaster	Ozark Mountain Skycoaster	Branson, Missouri	30 metres (100 ft)		Open	
Skycoaster	Extreme World/Mt. Olympus	Wisconsin Dells, Wisconsin	30 metres (100 ft)		closed	
Skycoaster	Andy Alligator's Fun Park and Water Park	Norman, Oklahoma	30 metres (100 ft)	2016	2021	
Sky Coaster	Morey's Piers – Adventure Pier	Wildwood, New Jersey	30 metres (100 ft)	1994	2025	
Sky Coaster	Adventure Park USA	Monrovia, Maryland	30 metres (100 ft)	2018	Open	
Royal Rush Skycoaster	Royal Gorge Bridge and Park	Royal Gorge, Colorado	30 metres (100 ft)	2003	Open	Positioned over a 1,200-foot (370 m) canyon.
Sky Swing	Seacoast Adventures	North Windham, Maine	30 metres (100 ft)		Open	
Skycoaster	Six Flags Discovery Kingdom	Vallejo, California	30 metres (100 ft)	2001	2021	
Drop Zone	Playland	Vancouver, Canada	30 metres (100 ft)	1998	2023	
Ripcord	Geauga Lake	Aurora, Ohio	30 metres (100 ft)	1999	2007	Sold at auction for $85,000, then put up for sale by third-party company ITAL International LLC for $105,000.
The Slingshot	Ratanga Junction	Century City, Cape Town	30 metres (100 ft)	1999	Closed	
Sky Coaster	Joyland Park	Wichita, Kansas	30 metres (100 ft)		Closed	
Sky Coaster	Morey's Piers – Surfside Pier	Wildwood, New Jersey	30 metres (100 ft)		2015	
Skycoaster	Kissimmee, Florida	Kissimmee, Florida	30 metres (100 ft)	1994	Closed	Located one mile east of Old Town (amusement park).
Parachute Drop	Mitsui Greenland	Arao-shi, Japan	Unknown		Open	
Flying Carpet	Tokyo SummerLand	Tokyo, Japan	Unknown		Closed	
Skycoaster	Orlando, Florida	Orlando, Florida	Unknown		Closed	Formerly known as "Bungee Mania".
