= Skyplex =

Cancelled entertainment complex in Orlando, Florida

- Concept art of the Skyplex complex
- Interactive map of the Skyplex area

General information
- Status: Cancelled/Never built

Skyplex was a planned entertainment complex to be located on a 14-acre (5.7 ha) lot at the northeast corner of Sand Lake Road and International Drive in Orlando, Florida. Plans for the complex were to include a 570-foot (170 m) tower which would have featured the world's tallest roller coaster, Skyscraper, and the world's largest Perkins Restaurant and Bakery. In January 2019 the project was expected to cost US$250,000,000 and include space for a future hotel. The complex was originally planned to open first in 2016. But pushed back to 2017, then 2018. The project was once again delayed to 2019, then was delayed yet again to 2020. In 2021, Joshua Wallack revealed that Lionsgate originally signed a deal with Wallack Holdings LLC to turn Skyplex into a theme park named Lionsgate World Resort Orlando, which was rumored to start construction in early 2021 and was set to open in late 2024. However, no updates nor announcements on the project happened. On December 21, 2022, US Thrill Rides LLC and Polercoaster LLC filed for Chapter 11 bankruptcy and would be liquidated. On January 30, 2023, WPC (Winter Park Construction) confirmed on a message that the project would not be moving forward, resulting in the complex being delayed. On October 17, 2024, The Orlando Business Journal confirmed that Skyplex was cancelled as the area is being put up for sale. As of 2026, no replacement for the former complex is planned or announced.

== History ==
The project began in 2012 with a planned budget of US$500,000,000. After several successful land negotiations conducted under the name WF IDrive Realty, development of Skyplex and the roller coaster began.

The complex was designed by Helman Hurley Charvat Peacock/Architects Inc. In May 2014, a website seeking investors was published.

In 2015, Wallack Holdings LLC spent US$50,000,000 to develop a retail complex, a parking garage, and a Mango's Tropical Cafe on the southwest corner of the same intersection as Skyplex.

On December 1, 2015, the Orange County Board of Commissioners unanimously approved the project's rezoning. The project was lobbied against by Save Our Orange County Community, a group backed primarily by Universal Orlando. Universal's main issues with the project were that the Skyscraper would have ruined the sight lines from their parks (specifically The Wizarding World of Harry Potter), and that Universal itself was not permitted to build anything over 200 feet (61 m).

Portions of the roller coaster's track had been completed by Intamin and were in storage by April 2017, but the start of construction in Orlando was on hold pending the approval of permits, which did not come to fruition.

In January 2019, it was announced that the project had been scaled back to US$250,000,000 and would only take up a portion of the planned 14-acre (57,000 m^{2}) site, but that the size of the tower and 2020 opening date would remain unchanged. The project was later removed from Mango's Tropical Cafe's website in June 2019. In 2021, Wallack revealed that Wallack Holdings had signed a licensing deal with Lionsgate Entertainment to open Skyplex as a Lionsgate Entertainment World resort, but the project had lost its financing in early 2020 as theme parks in Florida were being forced to closed due to the COVID-19 pandemic. Wallack Holdings still held the licensing deal and Joshua Wallack said that while he still believed in the Skyplex concept, practical considerations had him considering other uses for the site such as a resort hotel to support the nearby upcoming Universal Epic Universe theme park. On December 21, 2022, Polercoaster LLC and US Thrill Rides LLC, the companies that were planning to have the project be built, filed for Chapter 11 bankruptcy. On January 30, 2023, WPC (Winter Park Construction) confirmed that the project would not be moving forward, with the planned complex falling into uncertainty. The project was officially cancelled on October 17, 2024 with the area being put up for sale or lease.

== Planned attractions ==
Skyplex was to feature Skyscraper, which would have been the world's tallest roller coaster at over 500 feet (150 m). Development of Skyscraper began in 2012 after the Polercoaster concept from US Thrill Rides was selected as an attraction for the new complex. Skyscraper was officially announced on June 5, 2014. In February 2015, it was announced that a drop thrill ride called SkyFall was to be incorporated into the design of Skyscraper.

An adult game room was to feature party rooms, a central bar, billiards, video games, and simulators. The family game area would have featured traditional games, electronic games, and simulators. There would have been a 1,000 feet (300 m) high speed competitive go-cart track, and a 250 feet (76 m) track designed for all ages.

The Apex Sports Bar would have included private party rooms, VIP seating, a tequila bar, and large screen theatre style viewing of sports programs.

The Skyplex Observation Deck would have been 535 feet (163 m) high, and was planned to be accessible via what was to be Florida's tallest glass elevator.

There was to be an open-air retail area promenade, SkyPlaza, with a raised pedestrian walkway leading to the main entrance. SkyPlaza would have been anchored by a 10,000 square feet (930 m^{2}) Perkins Restaurant and Bakery, which was to be the largest in the world. The promenade would have included several other retail and restaurant tenants.
