= Pleasure Island Family Theme Park =

Defunct amusement park in England

- Interactive map of Pleasure Island Family Theme Park
- Location: Cleethorpes, North-East Lincolnshire, England
- Coordinates: 53°32′15.85″N 0°0′18.11″W
- Status: Defunct
- Opened: 27 May 1993
- Closed: 29 October 2016
- Owner: DewarSavile Enterprises Limited (Melanie Wood)
- General manager: Neil Ireland
- Slogan: Previous: "Discover the Magic" "Don't you wish you were here?" Last slogan : "Find yourself in a world of adventure"

Attractions
- Total: 46/47 attractions
- Roller coasters: 3
- Water rides: 2
- Previously owned by Flamingo Land Ltd

Pleasure Island Family Theme Park was a theme park in Cleethorpes, North East Lincolnshire, England. It was commonly known as Pleasure Island. The park opened on 27 May 1993. It was originally a subsidiary of Flamingo Land Ltd. Pleasure Island became independent of Flamingo Land in May 2010 and was owned and operated by DewarSavile Enterprises Ltd until closing at the end of the 2016 season.

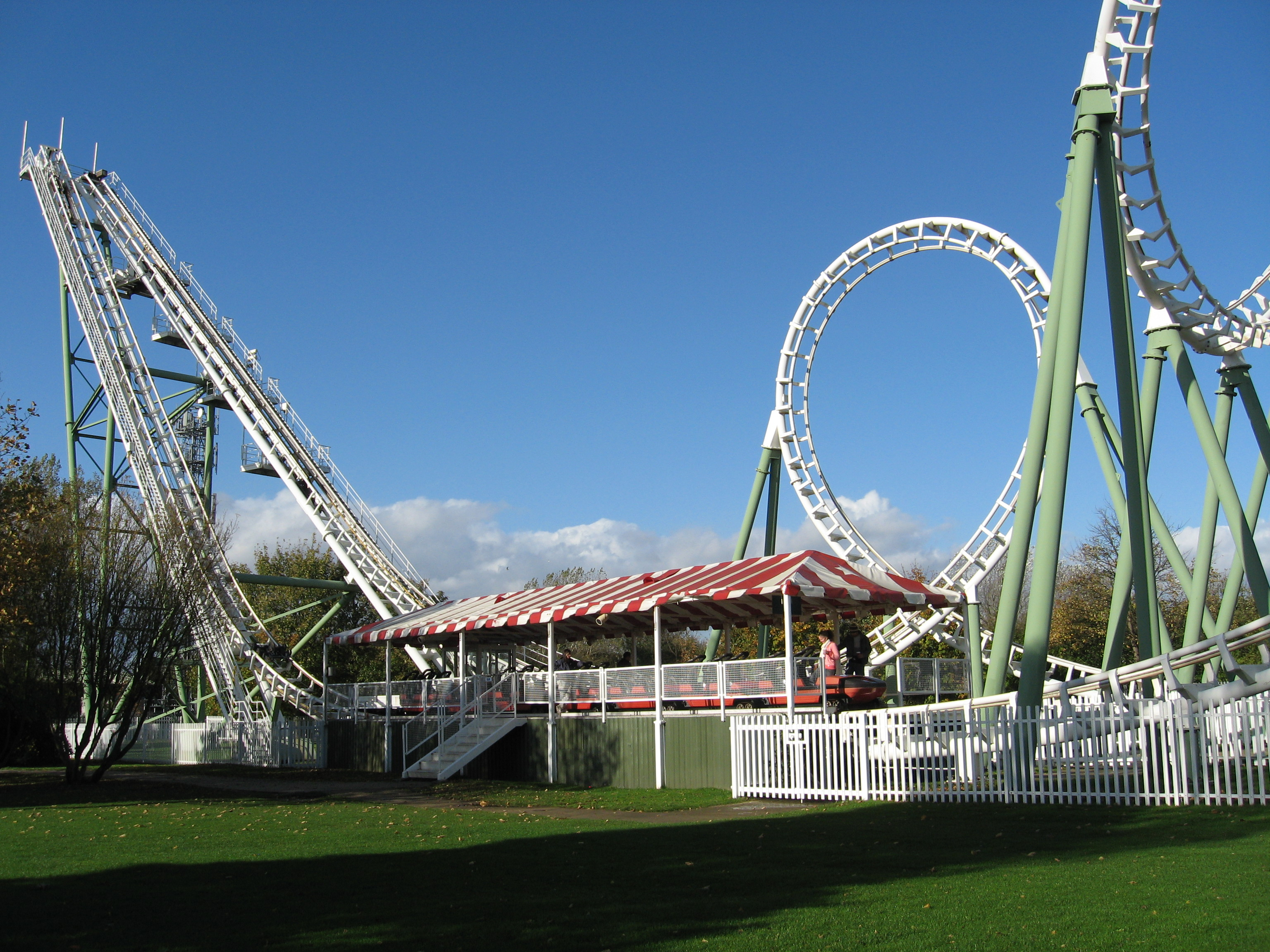
Boomerang - Manufactured by Vekoma, this was a steel roller coaster built to the standard. This ride has been dismantled and shipped to the Netherlands for a refurb before being relocated to Trans Studio Bali, Denpasar, Bali, Indonesia.

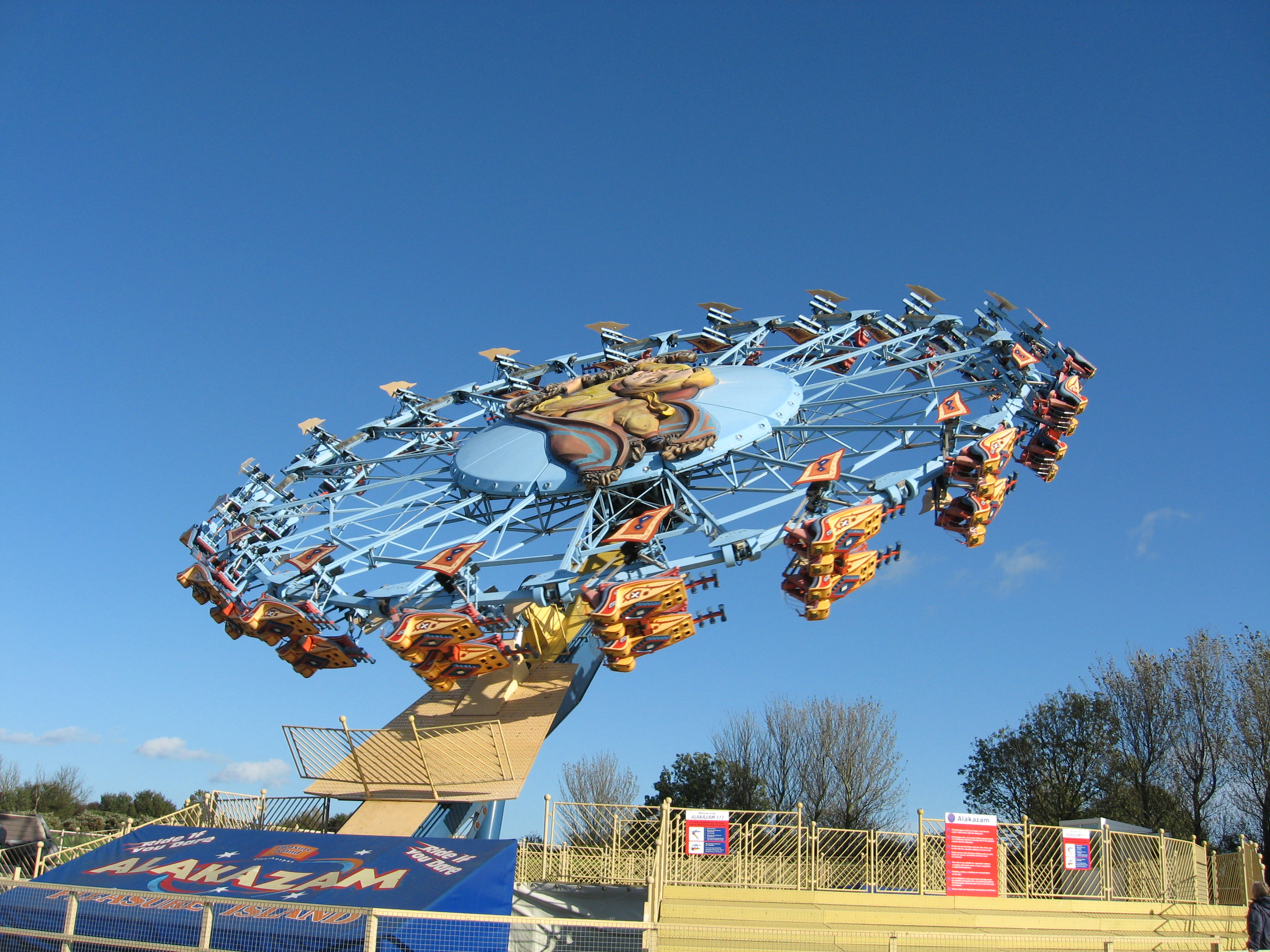
Alakazam - Manufactured by HUSS Park Attractions, this was a Fly-Away variation of the Enterprise ride, will relocated to Fantasialand, Santiago in Chile on 1 January 2019 'Super Hero’ however closed in 2023 and currently operating at Kuwait’s Winter Wonderland as ‘Fly Away’.

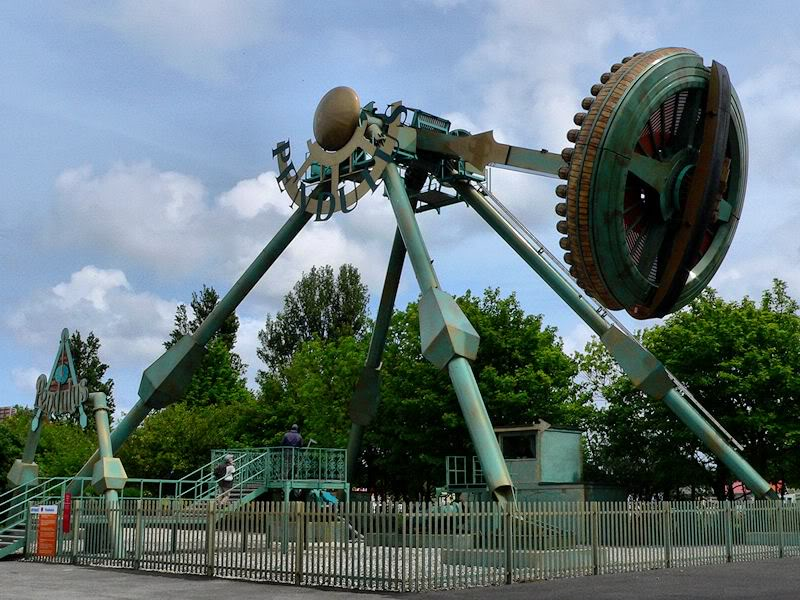
Pendulus - Manufactured by HUSS, this was the only park's model of the Frisbee ride in the UK. Went on to operate as Skyforce at Flambards, Cornwall, however the ride 'permanently' closed in July 2024, however, the ride re-opened in August 2024, for the last season before the closing of Flambards, and its subsequent scraping in August 2025.

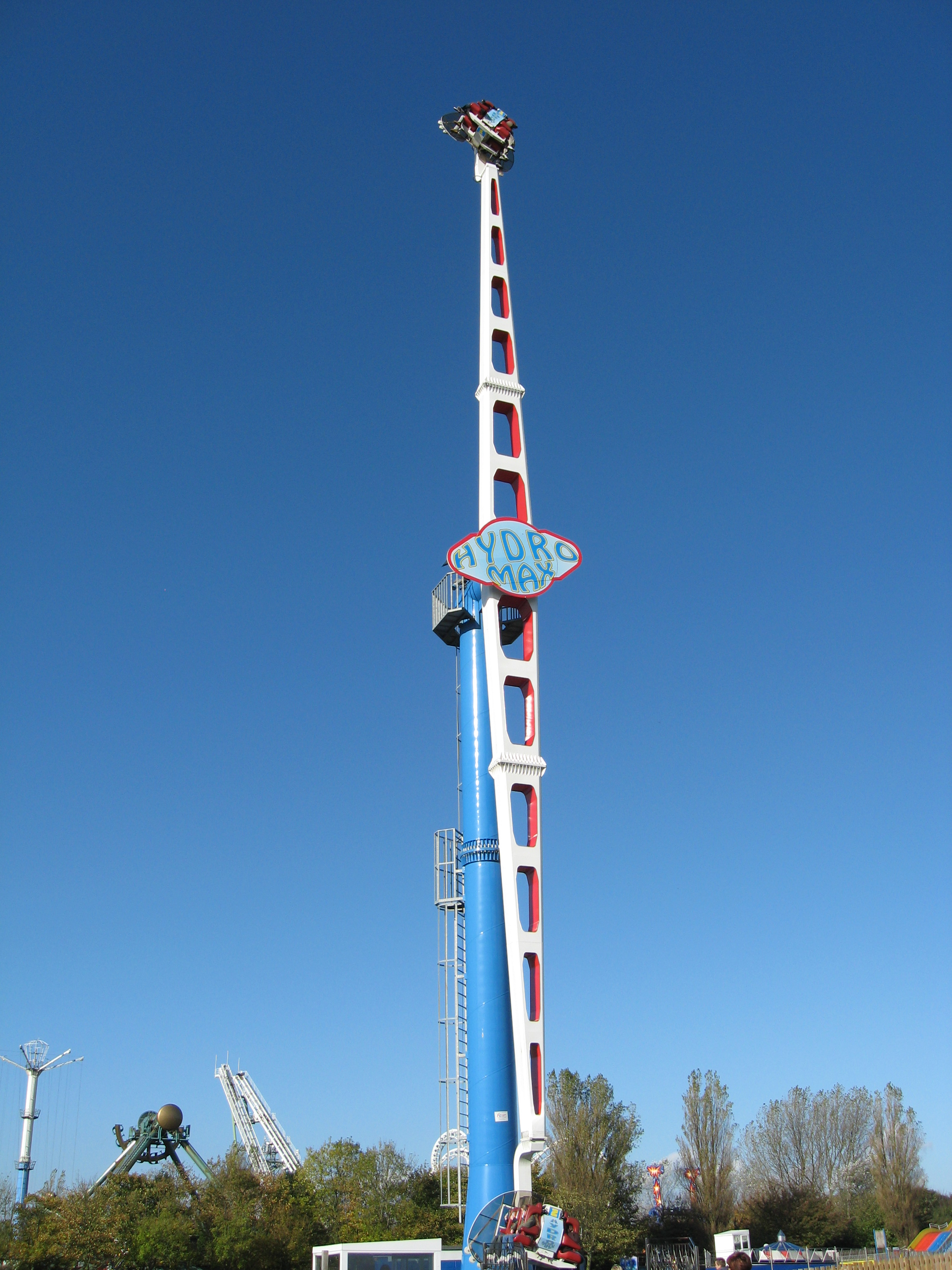
Hydro Max - Manufactured by Fabbri Group, this was a standard model Booster ride

== History ==
Pleasure Island Family Theme Park stood on the site of the former Cleethorpes Marineland and Zoo. Owned and operated as a satellite zoo of Flamingo Park, and later by Scotia Leisure, the zoo had such attractions as dolphins, sea lions and pelicans. The zoo closed in 1977. The site was sold to Pleasureworld, a division of RKF Entertainment, who announced that a new theme park would be built, as a sister park to the Pleasurewood Hills park near Lowestoft and bearing the same name. Construction began on the new theme park in the 1980s.

RKF Entertainment went into receivership during the early 1990s and construction of the park was halted. The site was sold to Robert Gibb, the managing director of Flamingo Land in Malton, North Yorkshire. Gibb decided to continue with the redevelopment of the site as a theme park, which became Pleasure Island. Reconstruction of the park was completed by Gibb in 1992 and Pleasure Island Family Theme Park was opened on 27 May 1993. Robert Gibb's son, Gordon Gibb, later became the chief executive of the company to directly run Flamingo Land, while his sister Vicky Gibb, and subsequently other sister Melanie Wood (formerly Gibb), took the responsibility for the management of Pleasure Island.

Negotiations took place to separate Pleasure Island from its sister park Flamingo Land, resulting in the managing director of Pleasure Island Melanie Wood taking control of the park on 14 April 2010 as a separate entity from the family company. Pleasure Island was then operated by Dewarsavile Enterprises Ltd, directed by Wood, and marked the end of Pleasure Island and Flamingo Land's association. As a result of the ownership transfer the Grimsby Telegraph website broke news that the park had closed. The park reopened under its new ownership on 1 May 2010. In 2013 a farm and petting zoo was added, including a tractor ride replacing an electric monorail.

Pleasure Island Family Theme Park closed permanently at the end of the 2016 season. The contents, including a 1904 carousel, were put up for auction. The last of the rides were sold off in October 2018 however as of 2025 the majority of the buildings themselves remain intact on the abandoned site. This includes all the buildings near the park entrance, the dodgems building, the children's show area and the building that housed the carousel ride. Current proposed plans for the site included two hotels, several hundred log cabins, a casino and other leisure developments and a Lidl supermarket.

== Areas ==
The theme park was split into 6 areas:

- Africa – themed around Africa, the largest area of Pleasure island and containing one white-knuckle ride
- Kiddies Kingdom – rides for especially young children
- Morocco – themed around Morocco, with three white-knuckle rides: the Alakazam, Hydromax and the Hyper Blaster
- Old England – themed around England, it contained the park entrance and was the smallest area of Pleasure Island
- Spain – themed around Spain and nearly as small as Old England, containing one ride and other attractions
- White Knuckle Valley – three white-knuckle rides: the Boomerang (a Vekoma Boomerang roller coaster), the Pendulus and the Terror Rack

== Height restrictions ==
The minimum heights are colour-coded as follows:

Height (metres)	Height (colour)
1.4 m (4 ft 7 in)	Red
1.3 m (4 ft 3 in)	Purple
1.2 m (3 ft 11 in)^{*}	Blue
1.1 m (3 ft 7 in)	Green
1.0 m (3 ft 3 in)	Yellow
0.9	—
0.8	—
0.7	—
0.6	—
0.5	—
Children Only^{**}	Pink
Anyone	White

* Although 1.2 m (3 ft 11 in), like green an adult was required on the ride with someone.
** Children below the age of 7 years, except where noted.

== Rides ==
=== Roller coasters ===
Roller Coaster	Height	Year	Description
Boomerang	Purple	1993-2016	A standard Vekoma Boomerang taken forward and back through a vertical loop and a cobra roll. The flagship rollercoaster has been fully refurbished and is currently under construction over in Indonesia at a theme park called Trans Studio Bali. No official name or opening date has been given.
Mini Mine Train	Yellow	1993-2016	A standard 208m Vekoma junior coaster themed to an African mine train completes the circuit twice through drops and helixes. This attraction has been refurbished and officially opened on 25 May 2019 at Transmart Pekalongan under the new name of 'Crazy Taxi'.
GoGator	Pink	1993-2016	A mini coaster themed around Dragons.

=== Thrill rides ===
Ride	Height	Year	Description
Alakazam	Purple	2002-16	A HUSS Flyaway variant of Enterprise. This ride has been refurbished and opened at Fantasilandia in Santiago, Chile on 1 January 2019 under the name of 'Super Hero’, however, as of the end of 2023 this ride has closed, subsequently removed from Fantasilandia. Alakazam is currently operating at Kuwait’s Winter Wonderland as ‘Fly Away’ whilst awaiting a new buyer.
Hydromax	Purple	2006-16	A Spin Doctor Ride (Booster). Purchased directly from the manufacturer in Italy. It has now been purchased and installed at ‘Happy Land’ an amusement park in Basra, Iraq which is operating under the rides original name “HydroMax” and still operates in the original colours.
Hyperblaster	Red	2000-16	A S&S Shot Tower at 90 ft. Has been refurbished and reinstalled at Navy Pier .
Obliterator	Red	2008-16	Previously at Flamingo Land, where it was known as Circulator. An Evolution Model. This ride has been sold and reopened at Baghdad Island Park, Iraq.
Pendulus	Red	2003-16	A HUSS Frisbee Ride themed around a clock. This ride was sold to Flambards theme park in Helston, Cornwall as Sky Force, however in June 2024 it was announced the ride had permanently closed at the site, however, the ride re-opened in August 2024, for the last season before the closing of Flambards, and its subsequent scraping in August 2025.
Terror Rack	Red	1995-2016	A Fabbri version of A HUSS Top spin ride overall lasts longer and is 'up-side-down' longer than other rides like Alton Towers. Has been removed from the site, and is now operating at Sindbad Land, Iraq still under the Terror Rack name.
Voltar	Blue	2015-16	A Vekoma Double Swinging Inverter Ride relocated from Flamingo Land, it used to be called Sky Flyer. Has been removed from the site and is now operating at Baghdad Island, Iraq alongside the Obliterator.

=== Family rides ===
Ride	Height	Description
Furry Friends and Tractor Ride	White	A farmyard animals attraction featuring a repainted monorail ride with tractor themed trains.
Flying Chairs	Yellow	A traditional Swing ride This ride has been removed from the park and is now a UK travelling ride with Taylors of Edinburgh.
Shreiksville	7+ y.o.	A scary ghost train built for the park by Studios East LTD a company specialising in UV art work. Has now been dismantled and is to be used as a new attraction for its new owner.
Century 2000	Green	has been removed from the site, it has been bought and was thought to be refurbished before travelling the UK.
Galleon	Blue	A classic Pirate Ship ride. The Galleon has now been relocated from Pleasure Island to Gullivers Land.
Dodgems	Red	A classic Bumper Cars attraction. Removed from the site. This ride has been bought by a wedding venue to which is used as part of the venues packages for guests.
Whirly Twirly Walzers	Yellow	A Tilt a Whirl attraction with seashell type cars. As of 2017, this ride was relocated to Funland and rethemed and renamed as "Neptune's Fury". It is currently at Gulliver's World.
Paratrooper	Yellow	Hrubetz Paratrooper attraction. Sold to an independent operator and now operates as a travelling ride.
Carousel	Yellow	A traditional Carousel horse ride. This ride has now been dismantled and sold to an undisclosed buyer, but will be travelling Ireland.
Astra Slide	Yellow	A tall slide which children and adults would ride down in bags. Has been dismantled and is now in Iraq alongside the Terror Rack and Obliterator.
Razzle Dazzle	Green	A spinning top going to different heights during the ride. Is now operating as a travelling ride with John Wesseldine after having a full light and sound refurbishment.
Lake Boats	Green	A free-roam Pedalo boat ride that's situated in a large lake at the centre of the park.
Annabel Train	White	2 ft (610 mm) train ride around amusements. This ride has been removed from Pleasure Island and is now been sent abroad for refurbishment before heading to another theme park.
Gravitron	Blue	A spaceship ride manufactured by Vekoma, was located at Pleasure Island after a short stint at Alton Towers, since Pleasure Island closed this ride is now located at Barry Island Pleasure Park. It also opened at Barry Island when new, a few years before its Alton Towers days.

=== Kiddie rides ===
Ride	Height	Description
Tinkaboo's Sweet Adventure	Pink	Indoors water-boat ride tailored towards young children that takes riders on a tour of the Tommy Tinkaboo sweet factory, full of animatronic characters and music specially designed by the former Rex Studios international ride theming and ride system built by WGH Ltd. This ride has been dismantled and sold as individual parts with some parts being used in other theme parks as spare/repairs and others including the famous toffee heads being sold at auction.
Frog Hopper	Pink	A miniature, frog-themed Drop tower ride. Has been removed, location unknown.
Mini Dodgems	Pink	A Bumper Cars ride tailored for young children. Relocated along with the Galleon to Gullivers Land.
Kiddies Cove	—	A small play park situated next to the sea lion show at the back of the park.
Kiddies Roundabouts	Yellow	
Kiddies Roundabouts	White	

=== Water rides ===
Ride	Height	Description
Falls of Fear	Blue	A water slide in which riders ride down in inflatable rafts. Was demolished on-site after the park closed.
Aquasphere	White	Closed in 2014 to make way for Voltar ride.

=== Former rides ===
- Condor – a HUSS Condor Stood on the site of Kiddies Cove, before being sold at auction
- 1001 Nights – replaced by The Galleon
- Dream Boat – stood where the Hydro Max is now
- Big Splash – a unique water ride replaced by The Falls of Fear
- Crazy Loop – a Pinfari Looping Roller Coaster that also previously operated at Flamingo Land under the same name. It is now located in Brean Leisure Park as 'Bulldog'
- 4 Man Bob – a small Schwarzkopf Bobsleigh Roller Coaster which was replaced by 'Crazy Loop'
- Pony Rodeo – a small, monorail-like rollercoaster themed around riding a horse
- Para Tower - originally from Drayton Manor Theme Park, was a tall structure that would take riders up for an overhead view of the park. Was scheduled for removal but was only removed after the park sold it for scrap metal.

== Shows ==
- Masai Warriors Show – introduced during ownership by Flamingo Land as a copy of their 'Bongo Warriors Show' (Africa)
- Bird Show – parrots, barn owls and red-legged seriema performing tricks (Spain)
- Sea Lion Show – sea lions performing tricks (Morocco)
- Tommy Tinkaboo Musical Extravaganza (Morocco)
- The Basil Brush Laughter Show (Africa)
- High School Summer – set as the movie High School Musical 1 + 2 (Morocco)
- Rock-afire Explosion - American-styled animatronic show featuring Billy Bob and his singing animal band (Morocco)
- Talking Chimps - An American animatronic show featuring talking and singing chimps. (Tinkaboo Town Corridor)

== Restaurants and eateries ==
- Food Court (Spain)
- McCormack's Family Bar – a family-themed restaurant and bar selling traditional British pub meals (Old England)
- Lakeside – drinks and snack sales
- Tommy`s Tukka / Tinkaboo Town Café – drinks and snack sales, located inside of the Tinkaboo Town Attraction
- Fatimas Fish & Chips – fish and chip shop.
- Sinbads Ice Cream Parlour – iced cream and drinks sales
- Carousel – Snack bar in the Carousel building.
- 90s / 00s Kiosks - Multiple small food and drinks kiosk's were located around the parks lake and kiddies kingdom area. These were removed well before the parks closure.

== Shops ==
- Tinkaboo Sweet Shop (Spain)
- Gift Shop (Old England)
- Shrieksville Shop of Horrors (Africa)
- Big Splash Photo Kiosk (Kiddies Kingdom)

== Others ==
- Ali Baba's Arcade – arcade with toilets next to the Gravitron and Spain area (Morocco)
- Kiddies' Cove – children's play area with swings and benches, next to the Sealion Show and Century 2000
- Tinkaboo Town Arcade - a short-lived small arcade located inside of Tinkaboo Town.
- Palace of Fun - An indoor soft play area removed in around 1997/98
