= Pentland Hick =

British entrepreneur, author, and WWII veteran

Edwin Pentland Hick (21 July 1919 – 6 March 2016) was a British entrepreneur, author, publisher, and veteran of World War II. Hick is best known for founding the Flamingo Land Theme Park and Zoo in North Yorkshire

== Military service ==
Hick served with the Eighth Army as a sergeant in the Royal Army Medical Corps from 1939 to 1945.

== Pentland Hick Cinemas ==
After World War II, he left the army and returned to his hometown of Scarborough, North Yorkshire, where he was given shares in the failing Aberdeen Walk Picture House when his father, a solicitor, was able to arrange for a client to grant a mortgage for it.

He renamed the cinema "The Gaiety" and turned it around financially. He built the business into Pentland Hick Cinemas, a chain of seven cinemas including the Wyke Star.

The Aberdeen Picture House is now a furniture store, with the original name still visible in stone relief along the front.

== Playwright/Impresario ==
During the 1950s, Hick was also writing - Samuel French published two of his one-act plays, The Singing Maid, and The Emperor Godiva.

He was friends with Harry Corbett and contributed scripting and promotion to Sooty. He brought Harry and Sooty to the stage in his show FAMILY FUN in Christmas matinees at the Adelphi Theatre in London, and holiday season matinees at the Floral Hall in Scarborough, North Yorkshire.

== Zoo and Theme Park ==
In 1959 Hick sold the cinema chain and bought a bankrupt country club on 9 acres (36,000 m^{2}) of land in the Ryedale district and named it the Yorkshire Zoological Gardens. He originally rented animals until receipts allowed him to buy more. The park housed not only pink flamingos, but the UK's first captive bottlenose dolphins in 1963 and later a whale. One of the dolphins was named Sooty after Corbett's creation.

The park grew to incorporate a funfair and amusement rides, one of the first zoos in Europe to do so. Hick floated the park on the London Stock Exchange in 1965 as Associated Pleasure Parks, and renamed the park "Yorkshire Zoo". Associated Pleasure Parks was then taken over by a larger company (Scotia Leisure) which shortly afterward collapsed in an embezzlement scandal, leaving Hick broke. The park was eventually to come full circle and is now, at 375 acres (1.52 km^{2}), once again Flamingo Land Theme Park and Zoo.

Later without capital, Hick tried many activities without notable success, until he went full-time into writing, including theatre and television scriptwriting. He died in March 2016 at the age of 96.

== Bibliography ==
- [ASIN B0000CHKBT] (1950) The Wasp Without Wings (no ISBN)
- [ASIN B0000CIGU4] (1953) The Singing Maid, A romantic comedy in Chinese the Manner (sic!) (no ISBN)
- ISBN 978-0-573-02248-7 The Singing Maid, acting edition
- [ASIN B0000CJS43] (1957) The Emperor Godiva: A play in one act (with apologies to Hans Andersen) (no ISBN)
- ISBN 978-0-573-05206-4 The Emperor Godiva: acting edition
- ISBN 978-0-9558235-8-9 (2009) Ogoun's Bomb: a novel
