= Valley Parade =

Football stadium in Bradford, West Yorkshire, England

- Interactive map of Valley Parade
- Full name: Mbanq Valley Parade
- Location: Valley Parade; Bradford; West Yorkshire; BD8 7DY; England
- Coordinates: 53°48′15″N 001°45′32″W
- Owner: Gordon Gibb pension fund
- Capacity: 24,840
- Surface: Grass
- Record attendance: 39,146 (Bradford City–Burnley, 11 March 1911)
- Field size: 113 yd × 70 yd (103 m × 64 m)

Construction
- Opened: 27 September 1886

Tenants
- Football; Bradford City (1903–1985, 1986–present); Bradford (Park Avenue) (1973–1974); Rugby League; Manningham RFC (1886–1903); Bradford Bulls (2001–2002)

Valley Parade, currently known as Mbanq Valley Parade for sponsorship reasons, is an all-seater football stadium in Bradford, West Yorkshire, England. The stadium was built in 1886 as the home of Manningham Rugby Football Club; it remained so until 1903, when the club changed code from rugby league to association football, and became Bradford City A.F.C. Valley Parade has since been Bradford City's home ground, and is now owned by the pension fund of the club's former chairman Gordon Gibb. The stadium has also hosted Bradford (Park Avenue) for one season and the rugby league side Bradford Bulls for two seasons, and has accommodated a number of England youth team fixtures. In 1908, the football architect Archibald Leitch was commissioned to redevelop the ground when Bradford City were promoted to the First Division.

Few changes were made until a fatal fire on 11 May 1985, when 56 supporters were killed and at least 265 were injured. The stand had been officially condemned and was due to be replaced with a steel structure after the season ended. Oliver Popplewell published his inquiry into the fire, which led to the introduction of new safety legislation for sports grounds across England. Following the fire, the stadium underwent a £2.6-million redevelopment and was re-opened in December 1986.

The stadium attendance record of 39,146 was set in 1911 at an FA Cup tie against Burnley, making it the oldest-surviving attendance record at a Football League ground in England. The ground underwent significant changes in the 1990s and the early 2000s, and now has a capacity of 24,840. The highest attendance at Valley Parade after this redevelopment stands at 24,343, set at a pre-season friendly against Liverpool in 2019. In 2026, the stadium's name was changed because of sponsorship from the Seattle-based financial company Mbanq.

== History ==
Manningham Rugby Football Club, which was formed in 1876, played games at Cardigan Fields in the Carlisle Road area of Bradford. When their ground was sold to facilitate the construction of Drummond School, the club bought one-third of the Valley Parade site in Manningham, taking a short-term lease on the rest of the land in time to play there for the 1886–1887 season. The new ground and the road upon which it was built adopted the area's name Valley Parade, which was derived from the steep hillside below Manningham. The land was previously a quarry, and formed part of a larger site that was owned by Midland Railway Company.

The club spent £1,400 appointing designers to oversee the excavation and levelling of the land, and moved a one-year-old stand from Carlisle Road to the highest part of the new ground. The original ground comprised the relocated stand, a 2,000-capacity stepped enclosure with the players' changing rooms beneath the stand, the playing area, a cinder athletics track and fencing to limit the capacity to 18,000. The playing field was made of ballast, ashes, soil and sods. The ground was officially opened on 27 September 1886 for a game against Wakefield Trinity, which was watched by a capacity crowd, but construction work meant most of Manningham's early games were away fixtures.

On 25 December 1888, 12-year old Thomas Coyle was killed at the ground when the barrier under which he was sitting collapsed on him, breaking his neck. An inquest decided the death was an accident that happened due to the weight of spectators leaning on the barrier. The takings from the game, totalling £115, were distributed to Coyle's family and those of other boys who were injured in the incident.

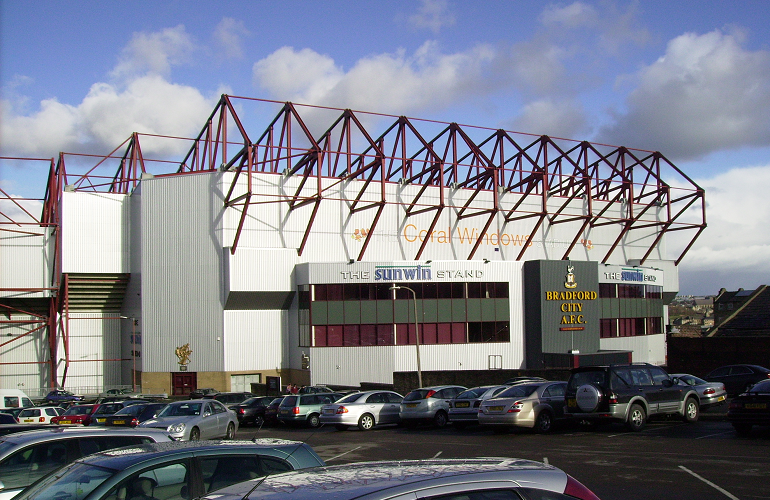
The ground's current main stand

Manningham RFC continued playing until 1903, when financial difficulties caused by relegation at the turn of the 20th century prompted club officials to change codes from rugby league to association football. The first association-football game to be played at Valley Parade on 6 April 1903 was a promotional fixture between a side of West-Yorkshire footballers and Sheffield United's 1903 FA Cup-winning side. The game was organised to stimulate interest in the sport in Bradford and attracted 8,000 fans. The new football club, Bradford City, were elected to The Football League's Division Two the following month. Bradford City's first game at Valley Parade came on 5 September 1903 against Gainsborough Trinity, drawing a crowd of 11,000. As a result of alterations first implemented in 1897, City players originally changed in a shed behind one end of the ground and visiting teams used the old rugby club's dressing rooms at the back of the nearby Belle Vue Hotel. After City's 5–1 defeat by Manchester United on 10 February 1906, United player Bob Bonthron was attacked as he left the ground. As a result, The Football Association (FA) closed the ground for 14 days, ordering City to switch its changing rooms to the nearby Artillery Barracks for the 1906–07 season. Several supporters faced criminal proceedings for the incident.

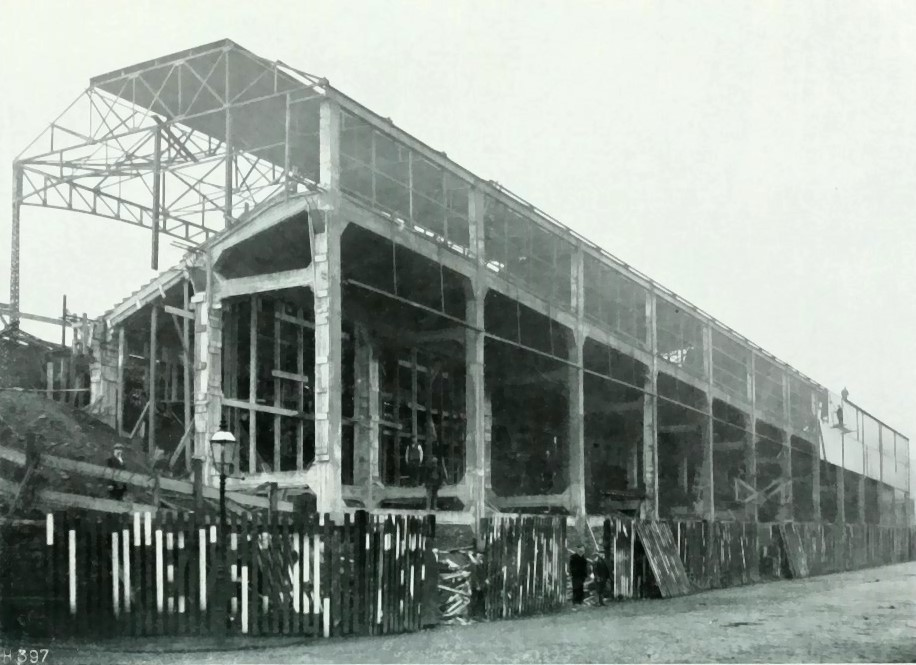
The concrete Midland Road stand for Bradford City Football Club nearing completion in 1908.

After Bradford City won the Division Two championship in 1907–08, the club hurriedly reconstructed the ground to prepare for the club's first season in Division One. Football architect Archibald Leitch was commissioned to design new terracing in the paddock—a standing area in front of the 5,300-seat main stand that was built in 1908—and build a Spion Kop at the north side of the ground and an 8,000-capacity stand at the Midland Road end opposite the main stand. Further work was done to lower the railings, erect barriers, move the pitch and add extra turnstiles. The changing rooms were moved and a tunnel leading from the rooms underneath the Kop along the main-stand side of the ground was built. The total project cost £9,958, and raised the capacity to 40,000. The work was completed midway through the 1908–09 season. Following the work, the first match took place on 25 December 1908, when 36,000 fans saw Bradford City host Bristol City. The improvements allowed Bradford City to set their attendance record of 39,146 on 11 March 1911 against Burnley during the club's FA-Cup-winning run. It is the longest-surviving attendance record at any league ground in England.

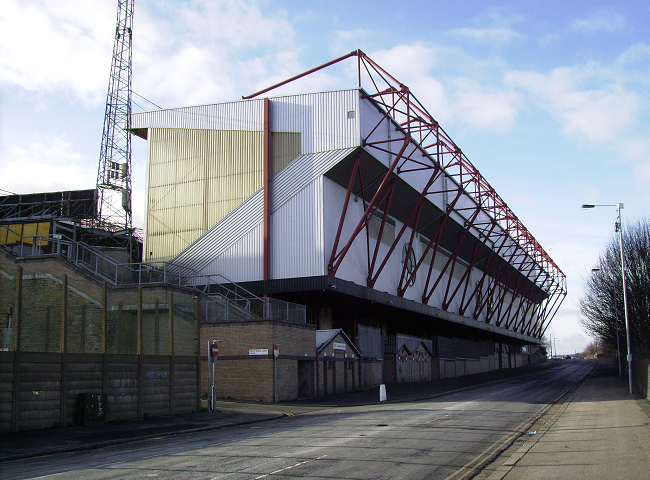
The Midland Road stand

On 17 March 1932, Bradford City paid Midland Railway Company £3,750 for the remaining two-thirds of the site to become outright owners of the ground, which was now 45 years old. The stadium had remained almost unchanged since 1908, and did so until 1952, when its capacity was reduced after examinations of the foundations were ordered following the 1946 Burnden Park disaster. The investigation resulted in the closure of half of the Midland Road stand, whose steel frame was sold to Berwick Rangers for £450, and a smaller replacement stand was built at Valley Parade in 1954. Six years later, the stand was again demolished because of continuing foundation problems. Six years later, all four stands at Valley Parade were able to be opened for the first time. To enable construction of a new stand on the Midland Road side of the ground, the club directors had the pitch moved 3 yards (2.7 m) closer to the main stand. The new stand was then the narrowest in the league. Further improvements to the stand were made in 1969, ready for the club's FA Cup tie with Division One side Tottenham Hotspur on 3 January 1970, which ended in a 2–2 draw in front of 23,000 fans. The cost of the work forced the club to sell Valley Parade to Bradford Corporation for £35,000, but it was bought back in 1979 for the same price.

From 1908 to 1985, the club carried out other work on the rest of the ground. These works included the introduction of floodlights in English football. Valley Parade's first floodlights cost £3,000 and were mounted on telegraph poles running along each side of the ground, and were first used for a match against Hull City on 20 December 1954. The floodlights were replaced in 1960 and again used for the first time against Hull City; in 1962, one floodlight collapsed and an FA Cup match against Gateshead went ahead with only three pylons, prompting an FA inquiry. In 1985, the football-ground writer Simon Inglis described the view from the main stand, which was still the same as when it was in 1908, as "like watching football from the cockpit of a Sopwith Camel" because of its antiquated supports and struts.

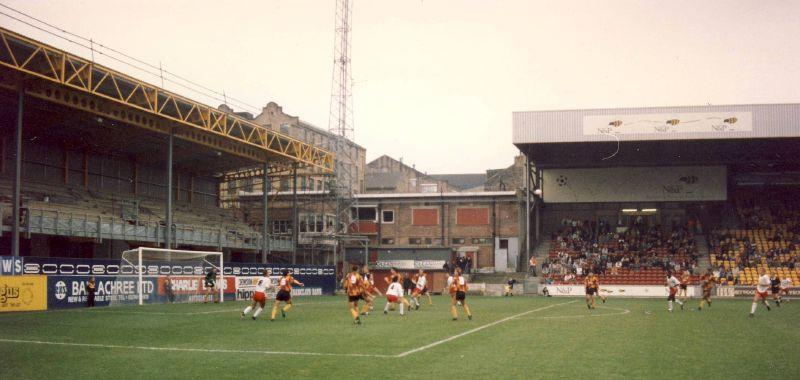
Valley Parade during the early 1990s, after it had been redeveloped following the fire, but before further work at the end of that decade

On 11 May 1985, 56 people died and at least 265 were injured in the Bradford City stadium fire at Valley Parade's main stand; it was one of the UK's worst sporting disasters. The fire started 40 minutes into the club's final game of the 1984–85 season against Lincoln City. The main stand was destroyed in nine minutes. For the next season and the first five months of the 1986–87 season, Bradford City played home games at Leeds United's stadium at Elland Road, Huddersfield Town's ground at Leeds Road and Bradford Northern's Odsal Stadium, while Valley Parade was rebuilt. The Huddersfield-based firm J Wimpenny carried out the £2.6 million work, which included funding from insurance pay-outs, The Football League stadium grants, club funds, and a £1.46 million Government loan obtained by the Bradford MPs Geoffrey Lawler and Max Madden. A new, 5,000 all-seater main stand that was longer than the previous structure, was built. The Kop was covered for the first time and increased to a 7,000 capacity. Other minor work was carried out to the ground's other two stands. On 14 December 1986, 582 days after the fire, The Hon Sir Oliver Popplewell, who had conducted the inquiry into the fire, opened the new stadium before an exhibition match against an England international XI. The new stand was first used for a league game on 26 December when City lost 1–0 to Derby County

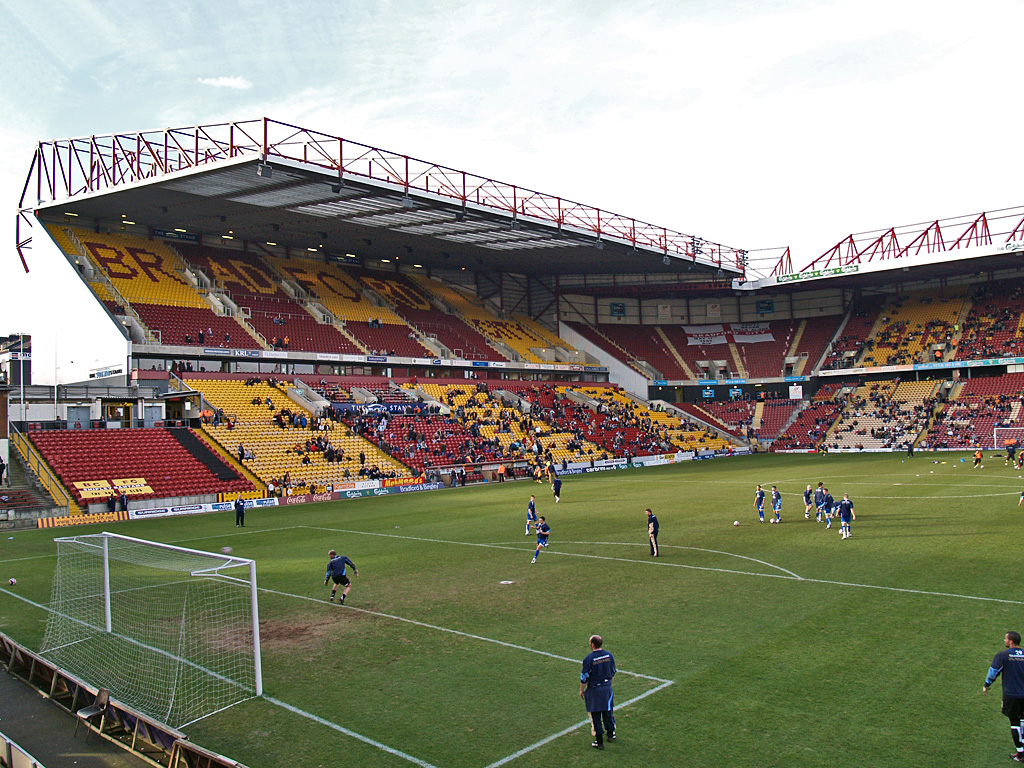
A view of the main stand from the Bradford end of the ground

The two stands that were not altered after the fire were improved during the 1990s. In 1991, the Bradford end of the ground was made a double-decker, all-seater stand, with a new scoreboard. Following City's promotion to Division One in 1996, the club's chairman Geoffrey Richmond announced the construction of a 4,500-seat stand on the Midland Road side. The new stand was first used for a Yorkshire derby against Sheffield United on 26 December 1996 and was officially opened by Queen Elizabeth II on 27 March 1997. Richmond continued his plans to redevelop the ground as the club continued to rise through the league. The roof of the Kop, which was the largest safe-standing terrace in England at the time, was removed and the capacity reduced during City's 1998–99 promotion season to prepare for a summer £6.5 million rebuilding programme. The Kop was converted into a two-tier, 7,500-seat stand. An additional 2,300-seat capacity corner section was built, filling the corner between the main stand and the Kop. The new section was opened in December 2000, taking the capacity of Valley Parade to more than 20,000 for the first time since 1970. A suite of offices and a shop were added at the same time. Once the work was completed, a second tier was added to the main stand at the cost of £6.5 million. It was opened in 2001, increasing the main stand's capacity to 11,000, and the ground's capacity to 25,000.

Richmond also planned to increase the main stand's capacity by a further 1,800 seats by building new changing rooms and office blocks, and adding a second tier to the Midland Road stand to increase the ground's capacity to more than 35,000. In May 2002, the club went into administration and Richmond was replaced by new co-owners Julian Rhodes and Gordon Gibb. The following year, Valley Parade was sold to Gibb's pension fund for £5 million, and the club's offices, shop and car park were sold to the London-based company Development Securities for £2.5 million. In 2011, Bradford City's annual rent bill to Gibb's pension fund was £370,000. The total budget for the year, including other rent payments, rates, maintenance and utility bills was £1.25 million.

Valley Parade has been renamed several times for sponsorship reasons. Sponsors have included the radio station The Pulse of West Yorkshire, the bank Bradford & Bingley, the electronics firm Intersonic and the double-glazing firm Coral Windows. The ground was renamed Northern Commercials Stadium in July 2016 but was still commonly known as Valley Parade. In July 2019 it was re-sponsored and renamed the Utilita Energy Stadium. This deal concluded in July 2022 and the stadium was subsequently renamed University of Bradford Stadium. In 2026, the Seattle-based investment company Mbanq took over as title sponsor of the stadium.

In April 2026, after four seasons, it was announced that the stadium would cease being called the University of Bradford Stadium from the 2026–27 season with the American investment company Mbanq taking over sponsorship of the stadium.

== Structure and facilities ==
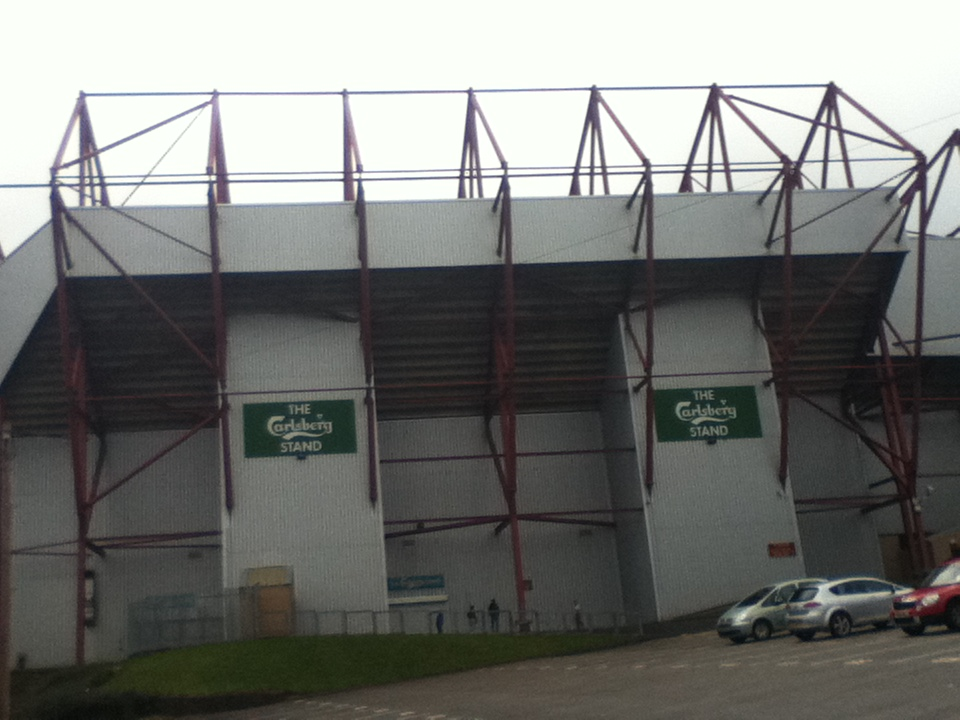
The Kop, formerly known as the Carlsberg stand

The Valley Parade stadium is divided into five all-seater stands, the JCT600 Stand, the Kop, the Midland Road Stand, the North West Corner and the TL Dallas Stand. All five stands, except for a small part of the main stand, are covered and all but the Midland Road Stand are two-tiered. Most of the stands are cantilever structures, and because of the ground's location on the hillside, the Midland Road Stand overhangs the road.

Many of the stands have more traditional names but have since been renamed because of sponsorship deals. The JCT600 Stand is the ground's main stand, and fans often call thus, but is also known as the Sunwin Stand after its former sponsor. The Kop, was the standing area whose name was derived, like at many stadia across England, from the Battle of Spion Kop. The East Stand, which is sponsored by Northern Commercials, is also named the Midland Road Stand because of the road on that side of the ground. The TL Dallas Stand is also known as the Bradford end because it is nearest to the city centre.

The capacity of Valley Parade is 24,840. The largest stand is the Morrisons Family Stand, which holds 9,004 supporters, followed by the Kop, which has a capacity of 7,392. The Bradford Lifts Stand holds 4,500 and the North West Corner 2,300. The TL Dallas Stand is the smallest of the five stands with a capacity of 1,644. The stadium includes 134 seats for media representatives.

The Sunwin Stand has further room for expansion, and is unusual because it covers only three-quarters of the length of the pitch. The rest of this side is taken up by a brick building in the south-west corner of the stadium that houses the club's changing rooms and security offices. The Sunwin Stand also includes the ground's 17 executive boxes and conference facilities, which have capacity of 700 people. A second function room, called the Bantams Bar, in the Kop can accommodate 300 people. There is more office space, a club store, ticket office and a museum in the car park behind the Kop. From early 2010, the area near the store includes a dental surgery, which will be run by NHS Bradford and Airedale in partnership with the football club.

Visiting team fans sat in the TL Dallas Stand from 1995 to 2008, but have also been given other parts of the ground for large matches. In March 2008, the club announced the TL Dallas Stand would be made available for home fans during the 2008–2009 season. The decision came after an overwhelmingly positive text-message poll from the club's supporters to use the Bradford End of the ground. Fans of visiting teams have been accommodated in the end blocks of the East Stand since the start of the 2008–2009 season.

== Fire disaster ==
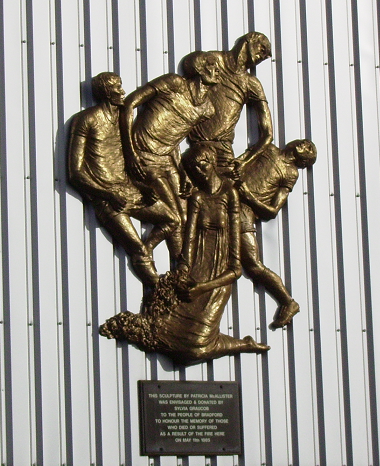
A memorial, erected on the club's main stand, to the victims of the fire in 1985

On 11 May 1985, 11,076 people attended Bradford City's final Division Three game of the 1984–1985 season against Lincoln City. The Bradford side had won the Division Three title the week before when they defeated Bolton Wanderers 2–0. The league trophy was presented to City's skipper Peter Jackson before the Lincoln game. The score was still 0–0 after 40 minutes of the game when a small fire was noticed three rows from the back near one end of the main stand. The flames became more visible within minutes, and police started to evacuate people in the stand less than six minutes later.

The club's chairman Stafford Heginbotham, who was in the main stand, described the effect and his reaction to the disaster: "The fire just spread along the length of the stand in seconds. The smoke was choking. We couldn't breathe. It was to be our day." The game was stopped and the wooden roof caught fire. The fire spread the length of the stand, and timber and the roof began to fall onto the crowds. Black smoke enveloped the rear passageways, where fans were trying to escape. The fire killed 56 spectators, ranging in age from 11-year-old children to the 86-year-old former chairman of the club Sam Firth. At least 265 supporters were injured. In some cases, the few narrow escape routes led to locked doors and the only escape for most spectators was directly onto the pitch. The match was abandoned and never replayed; The Football League ordered the score at the time of abandonment to stand. According to Steve Smith, a former club official:

All of a sudden, a sheet of flame went up to the roof and along the entire length of the stand. Within five minutes of it starting, the whole stand was burnt down. In fact, I think it was timed at 4min 35sec. The strong wind was fanning it from the end where the blaze had started.

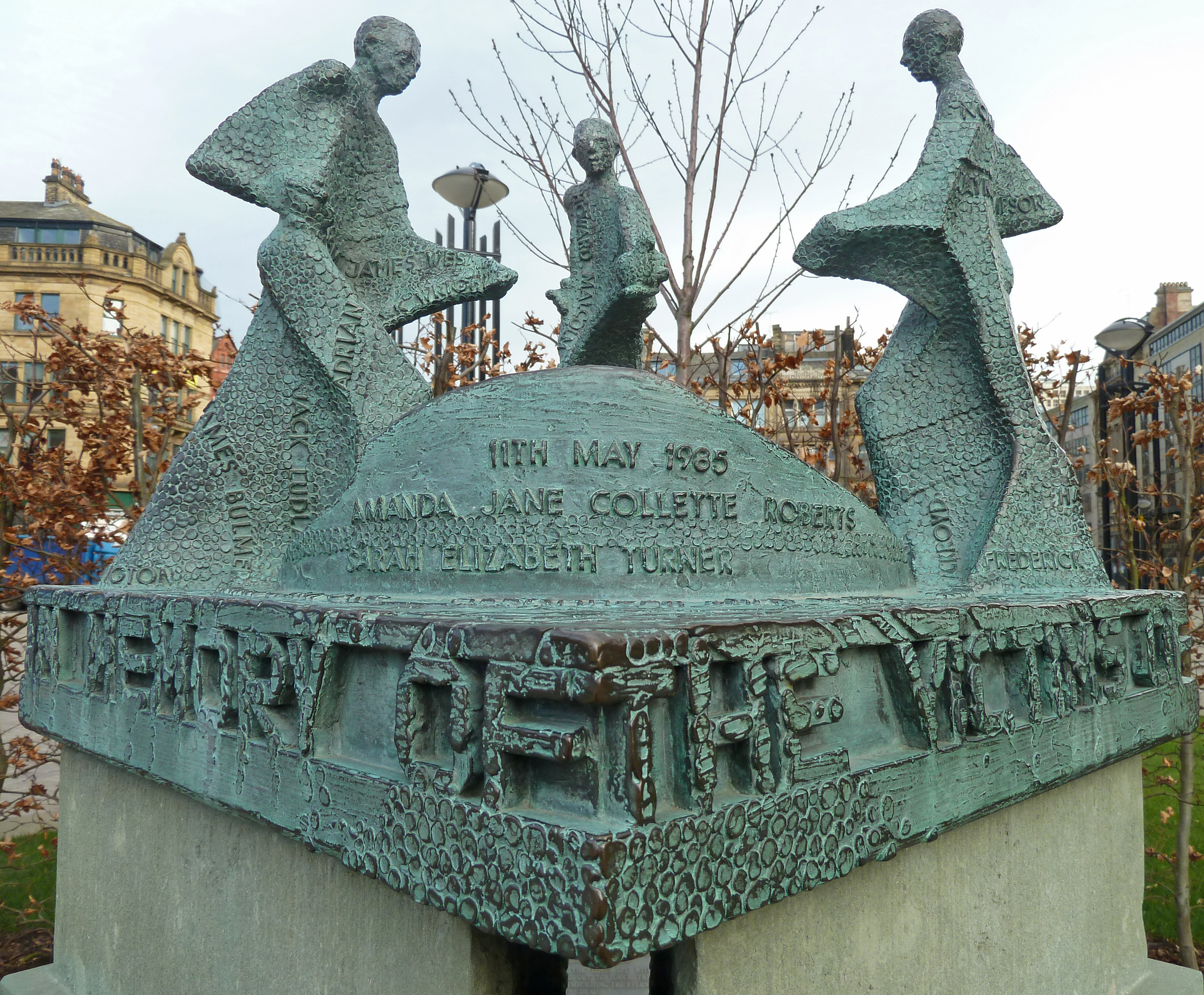
A memorial in Bradford city centre

In 1986, Sir Oliver Popplewell published his inquiry into the fire, which led to the introduction of new safety legislation for sports grounds across England. The forensic scientist David Woolley believed the cause of the fire was a discarded cigarette or a match that had dropped through gaps between the seating to a void below the stand where rubbish had built up. A number of police officers and 22 spectators were given bravery awards for their actions during the incident.

The stand's wooden roof was due to be replaced the day after the Lincoln match because it did not meet the safety regulations required for Division Two, in which the team would be playing in the following season. Work did not begin until July 1986. The ground was used for reserve-team fixtures from September 1985 but only journalists and club officials were able to watch. Bradford City's senior team played home games at other grounds in West Yorkshire for 19 months while Valley Parade was rebuilt. The new ground, which cost £2.6 million (£7.8 million today) to rebuild, was reopened in December 1986.

More than £3.5 million (£10.8 million today) was raised for victims of the fire and their families through the Bradford Disaster Appeal Fund. Memorials have been erected at the ground and at Bradford City Hall, the latter of which was provided by Bradford's twin town of Hamm, Germany. The disaster is also marked by an annual remembrance ceremony on 11 May at Bradford City Hall, and an annual Easter-weekend youth tournament, which is contested between Bradford, Lincoln and other European teams.

== Other uses ==
Valley Parade was the headquarters of The 2nd West Riding Brigade Royal Field Artillery (Territorial Force). The ground hosted its first international football game just two months after its first Football League match. The game's governing bodies wanted to promote football in the West Riding of Yorkshire and chose Valley Parade to host a game between an English League side and an Irish League side, despite the ground being below standard. An estimated 20,000 spectators attended the match on 10 October 1903, which the English League won 2–1. Over the next 20 years, the ground hosted a number of other representative games, including an England international trial, the 1904 FA Amateur Cup Final and an under-15s schoolboy international between England and Scotland. On 6 April 1987, the ground hosted another international when England under-18s drew 1–1 with Switzerland.

Other under-18 fixtures have been played since 1987, the last of which was between England and Belgium in November 2000. It hosted two England under-21 international friendlies; the first was against Denmark's under-21s side on 8 October 1999, which ended with a score of England 4–1 Denmark. The other was against Italy's under-21s on 26 March 2002, which ended in a 1–1 draw with 21,642 in attendance. Valley Parade's next international came seven years later when Bradford City hosted an under-19s European Championship qualifying game, in which England defeated Slovakia 4–1. The England women's team have also played at Valley Parade, including their 1994 first home match under the auspices of The Football Association (FA) against Spain.

Bradford (Park Avenue) have played 29 games at Valley Parade, including a 2–0 friendly victory over Swiss side AC Lugano in 1962, and all of their home fixtures in 1973–1974, their last season before the club's extinction. Bradford's rugby league side Bradford Northern played a number of fixtures at Valley Parade between 1920 and 1937, as well as three games in the 1980s and the 1990s. Bradford Northern became Bradford Bulls with the advent of the Super League, and played two seasons at Valley Parade in 2001 and 2002 while their home ground Odsal Stadium was redeveloped.

== Records ==
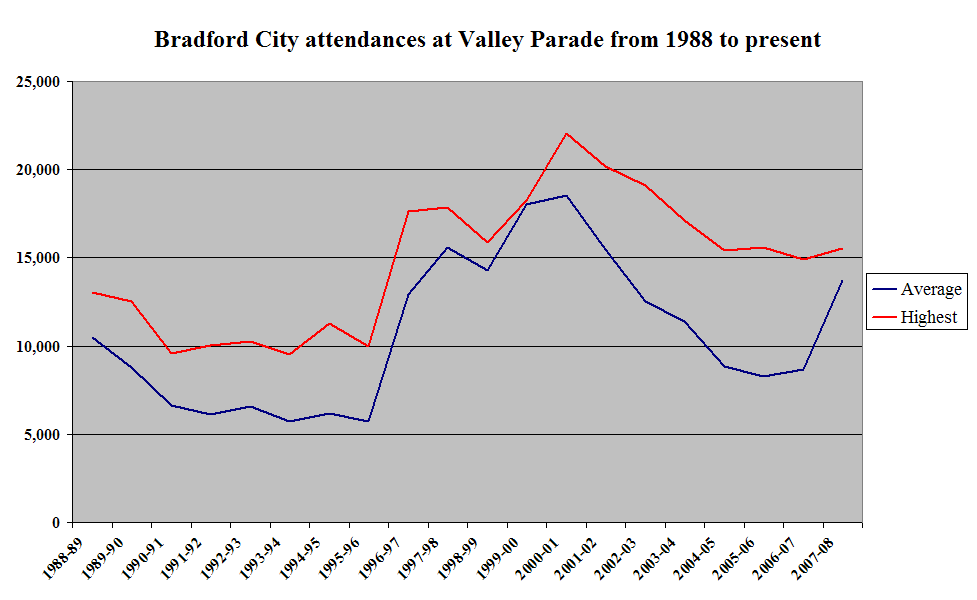
Bradford City's average and highest league attendances at Valley Parade, for full seasons, since the ground reopened in 1986

The record attendance at Valley Parade is 39,146 for Bradford City's FA Cup fourth round tie against Burnley on 11 March 1911. The highest league attendance of 37,059 was for a Bradford derby match between Bradford City and Bradford (Park Avenue) on 17 September 1927 in Division Three (North). The record attendance since the Valley Parade grounds were rebuilt in 1986 with all-seated attendance is 24,343, which was set on 14 July 2019 during a pre-season friendly against Liverpool. The highest attendance for a competitive fixture is 24,321, which was set on 7 March 2015 in the 2015 FA Cup quarter-finals draw against Reading, exceeding the previous record of 23,971, which was set on 10 December 2012 in the club's 2012–13 Football League Cup quarter-finals win against Arsenal. The lowest attendance for a league home match at Valley Parade is 1,249, which occurred on 15 May 1981, for a Division Four fixture with Hereford United. The record gate receipts for Bradford City is £181,990 for the Premier League game with Manchester United on 13 January 2001.

The Football League did not record official attendance figures for league games until 1925. City's official highest-average attendance at Valley Parade since then is 18,551 for the 1928–29 promotion season from Division Three (North), although the club reported an average of 22,585 in 1920–21. After Bradford City were promoted to the Premier League in 1999, the club again recorded average attendances in excess of 18,000. City recorded an average attendance of 18,030 in 1999–2000, and 18,511 the following season.

During their two years at Valley Parade, Bradford Bulls recorded their highest attendance of 16,572 on 4 March 2001 against St. Helens. Bulls averaged 11,488 in 2002 for Super League VII. The highest crowd for a Bradford Northern fixture at Valley Parade was 20,973 on 13 February 1926 for a Challenge Cup game against Keighley, which finished 2 to 2.

== Transport ==
Bradford is served by two railway stations; Bradford Interchange, which is also the city's main bus terminus, is one mile (two kilometres) from Valley Parade. The other is Bradford Forster Square, which is 0.6 miles (1 km) away from the ground. Bradford Interchange connects to Leeds railway station for London North Eastern Railway and CrossCountry train services, Grand Central provide a direct service to London, and provides First Bradford and Keighley Bus Company buses to the ground. Forster Square, which provides train services operated by Northern, also connects to Leeds. The stadium has no parking facilities available to supporters on match days. In 2000, as part of the expansion of Valley Parade, the club drew up a green transport plan to ease traffic congestion around the ground. Proposals included a new railway station on the line between Leeds and Bradford Forster Square, and a discounted bus service. As of 2013, no railway station had been built and a discounted bus route was withdrawn because of low patronage.

== See also ==
- List of stadiums in the United Kingdom by capacity
- Lists of stadiums
