= Sik (roller coaster) =

Steel roller coaster

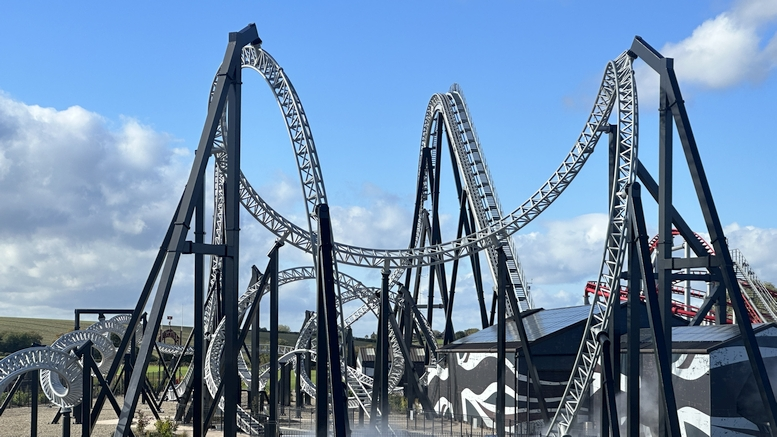
- Sik, Flamingo Land, 2022

Flamingo Land Resort
- Location: Flamingo Land Resort
- Coordinates: 54.2097661°N 0.8102617°W
- Status: Operating
- Opening date: 2 July 2022
- Cost: £18 million
- Single rider line available

General statistics
- Type: Steel
- Manufacturer: Intamin
- Designer: Werner Stengel
- Model: Multi Inversion Coaster
- Track layout: 10 Inversion Rev. B
- Lift/launch system: Cable lift hill
- Height: 108.3 ft (33.0 m)
- Length: 2,870.8 ft (875.0 m)
- Speed: 52.9 mph (85.1 km/h)
- Inversions: 10
- Duration: 1:05
- G-force: 3
- Trains: Single train with 6 cars; riders arranged 2 across in 2 rows for a total of 24 riders per train
- Restraints: Lap bar
- Sik at RCDB

Sik is a steel roller coaster at Flamingo Land in North Yorkshire, United Kingdom. It opened to the public on 2 July 2022.

== History and design ==
Flamingo Land submitted a planning application for a 10-inversion rollercoaster in June 2019. The ride is repurposed but previously unused, having been held in storage for several years after it was originally ordered by Brazilian theme park Hopi Hari in 2011. It opened to the public on 2 July 2022.

It is an example of a second-generation Multi Inversion Coaster from manufacturers Intamin. Colossus at Thorpe Park is of a similar, but first-generation design. The later generation model features a more aggressively profiled first drop and trains that have lap-bar restraints. Trains also enter the final run of heartline rolls at considerably increased speed in comparison to the first-generation models.

Along with Colossus, Sik holds the second-highest number of inversions (10) of any British rollercoaster, behind Alton Towers's Smiler with 14.

=== Testing ===
By late May 2022, the ride was testing without passengers. During early passenger-less testing in June 2022, water dummies fell from the train during the final run of heartline rolls. By mid-June it was testing with Flamingo Land staff.

== Name and partnership ==
Sik takes its name from the Scarborough-based fashion brand SikSilk, with whom Flamingo Land entered into a partnership in 2022.

== Elements and inversions ==
No.	Inversion
1	Vertical Loop
2	Cobra Roll
3	Cobra Roll
4	Corkscrew
5	Corkscrew
6	Heartline Roll
7	Heartline Roll
8	Heartline Roll
9	Heartline Roll
10	Heartline Roll
