= Flamingo Land Resort =

Theme park, zoo, and resort in North Yorkshire, England

- Previously known as Yorkshire Zoo; Flamingo Park

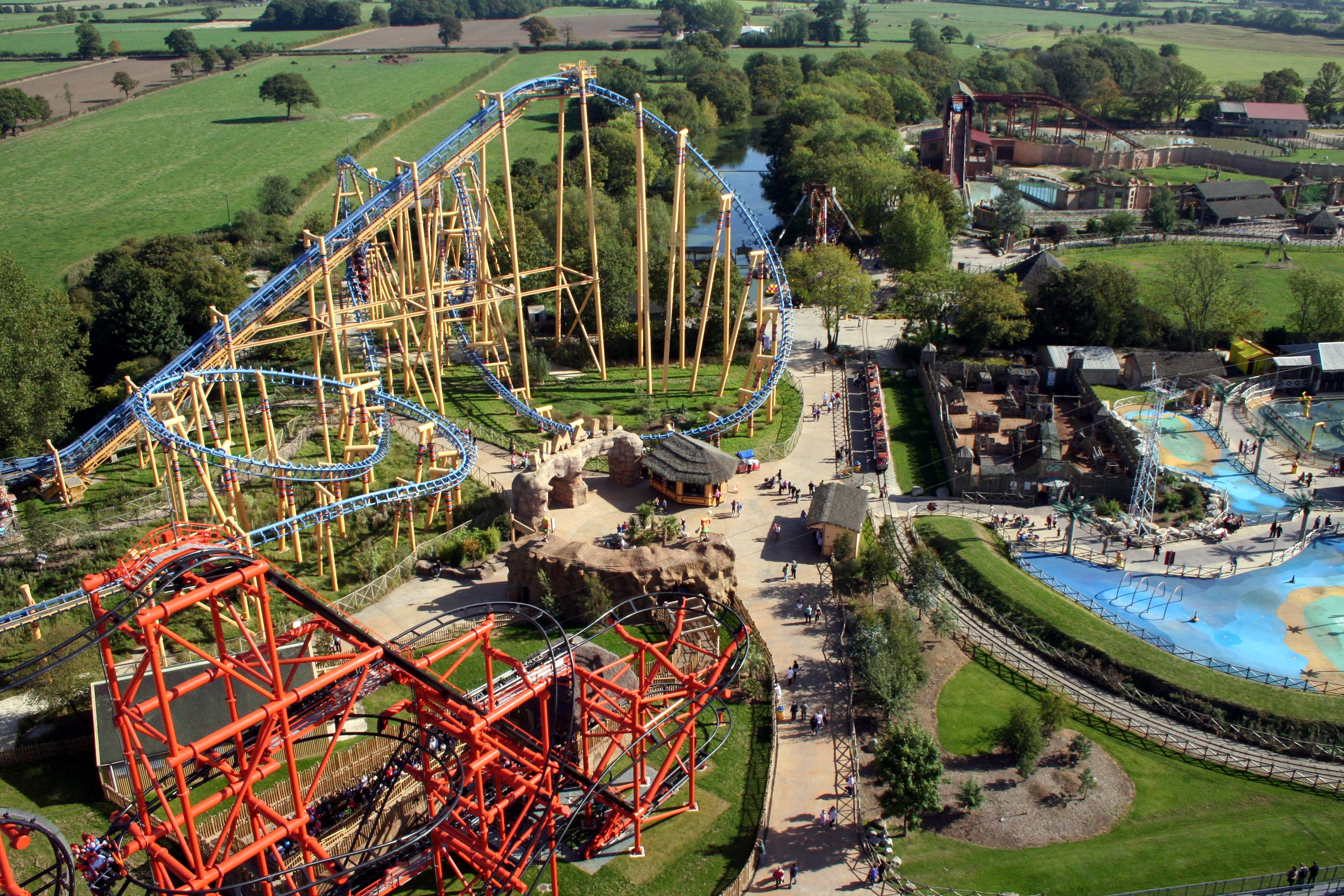
- Aerial view
- Interactive map of Flamingo Land Resort
- Location: Kirby Misperton, North Yorkshire, England
- Coordinates: 54.2097°N 0.8082°W
- Status: Operating
- Opened: 1959
- Owner: The Gibb Family
- Operated by: The Gibb Family
- General manager: Gordon Gibb
- Slogan: "Wild Animals, Wilder Rides"
- Operating season: Theme Park; March – November; Zoo; Year-round; The Club; March – November; Accommodation; Year-round; Parkland Golf Course; Year-round; The Splash Zone; Year-round
- Attendance: ▲895,000 (2021)
- Area: 375 acres (152 ha)

Attractions
- Total: 50
- Roller coasters: 8
- Water rides: 2
- Website: www.flamingoland.co.uk

Flamingo Land Resort is a theme park, zoo, and resort located in Kirby Misperton, North Yorkshire, England. Opened in 1959, it has been owned and operated by The Gibb family since 1978.

== History ==
Flamingo Land Resort was established in 1959 when a cinema entrepreneur, Edwin Pentland Hick, sold his cinema chain and used the funds to purchase a bankrupt country club to use the land for a zoo. The site, which occupied nine acres, was initially called The Yorkshire Zoological Gardens. A colony of flamingos were among the first animals to be housed on site.

In 1963 the gardens became home to the UK's first captive bottlenose dolphins – one of whom was given the name Sooty after the children's TV puppet. During the 1960s a small funfair opened on the site. In 1965 the company was floated on the London Stock Exchange as Associated Pleasure Parks and in 1968 the park was renamed Flamingo Park Zoo.

In 1968 the park purchased a killer whale from an aquarium in Seattle. Flamingo Park became the first in the UK to house a killer whale, who lived alongside the bottlenose dolphins. Cuddles soon became aggressive towards both the dolphins he lived with and the trainers he worked with and was sold to Dudley Zoo in 1971.

In the 1970s amusement rides had become a permanent fixture of the park along with the zoo, becoming the first site in Europe to combine the attractions in one location.

The park was losing money by 1974 and underwent a major revamp when it was renamed Flamingo Land. More emphasis was placed on the "day out" experience – with fairground rides, a haunted castle, model railway and a jungle cruise raft ride on the lake. Despite a more professional marketing approach that saw regular guest appearances by celebrities and stars of the day (including the racehorse Red Rum), Flamingo Land continued to lose money.

The owners, Scotia Leisure Ltd, sold the site in 1978 to Robert Gibb – a former director at Scotia leisure. He put a team in place to develop the complex as a national rather than local tourist attraction, including investing in amusement rides. Many staff were made redundant, with most re-engaged on seasonal contracts.

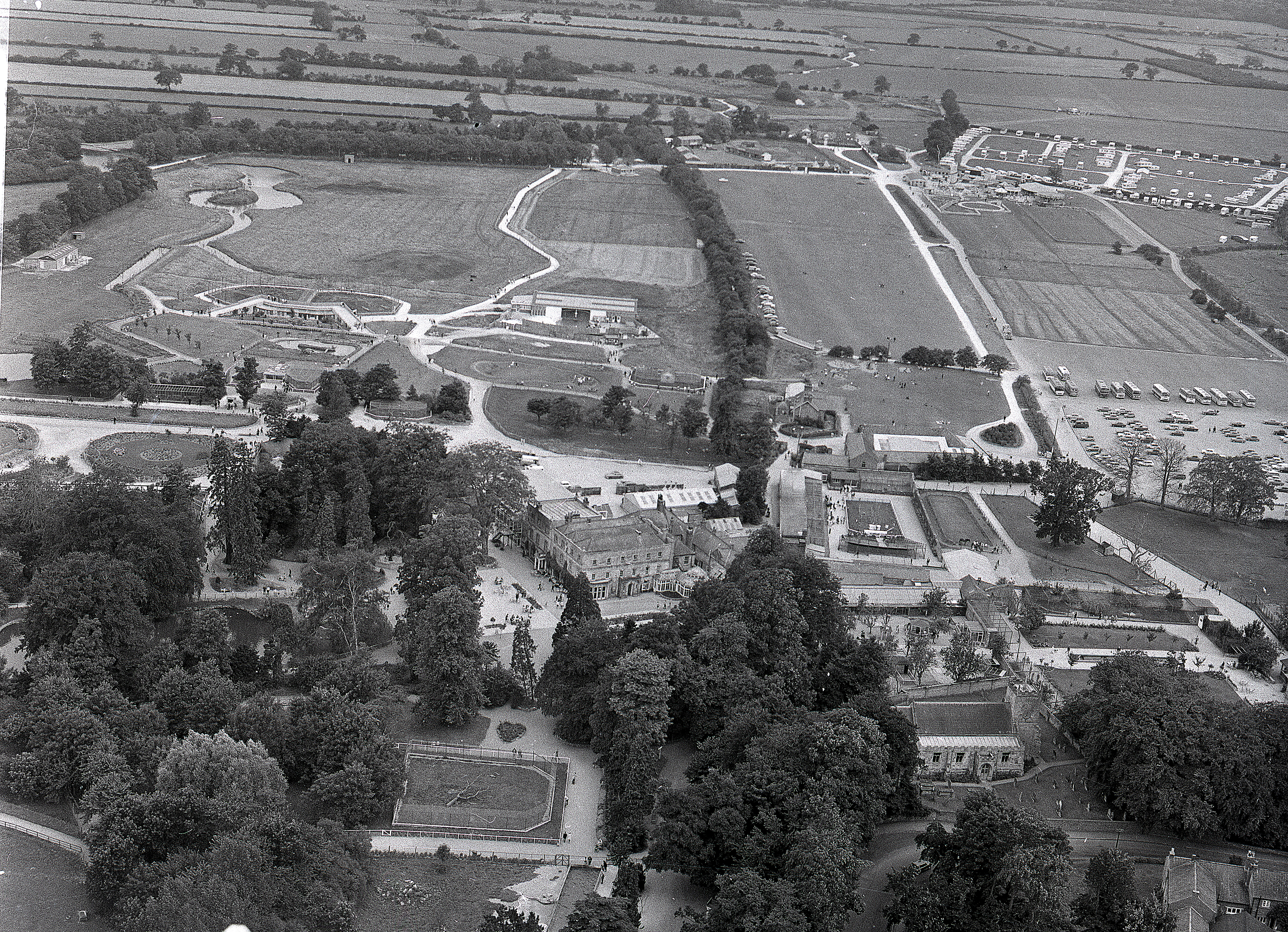
Flamingo Park Zoo, as it looked from the air in 1969

In 1995 Robert Gibb died in a car accident. His son, Gordon Gibb, only 18 at the time, and his two sisters, Vicky and Melanie, took over the running of the park.

== Attractions ==
Some of the major attractions at Flamingo Land include:

- Sik – Intamin second-generation 'Multi Inversion Coaster', 10-inversion model opening at a reported cost of £18 million for the 2022 season. The ride is sponsored by local clothing company SikSilk. It is located in Metropolis.
- Hero – Suspended Flying Coaster added for 2013 in the Metropolis area of the park. The ride was closed on 22 May 2015 when a piece of foot rail came loose and struck riders, but reopened after a thin safety net was added under the track where it passes over the queue.
- Pterodactyl – A Zamperla Vertical Swing installed in 2012 in the new Dino-Stone Park for the 2013 season.
- Mumbo Jumbo – Opened in Summer 2009, this roller coaster is an S&S El-Loco and was recognised at the time by the Guinness World Records as having the steepest drop. It is located in the Lost Kingdom area of the resort.
- Kumali – Installed in 2006, this is a Suspended Looping Coaster made by Vekoma.
- Navigator – Installed in 2005, it was the first 'Mega' "Disk 'O'" type of ride ever to be built by Zamperla.
- Velocity – Constructed in 2005, replacing the Thunder Mountain attraction. It was built by Vekoma. The ride was the first booster bike ride in the United Kingdom and is the tallest and fastest of its type in the world. It is estimated to have cost around £7 million.
- Cliff Hanger – Opened in 2002 and located in Riverside One, this is the first and tallest S&S Combo Tower in the United Kingdom.

Also on the site is a gym, a leisure centre, a spa, a golf course and a large collection of log cabins and static caravans.

== Pleasure Island ==
Flamingo Land also operated sister park Pleasure Island Family Theme Park in Cleethorpes from its opening on 23 May 1993 until April 2010, when it became independently operated.

On the former site of Cleethorpes Zoo, construction for an amusement park began in the 1990s, managed by RKF Entertainment. During this time RKF went into administration and Robert Gibb purchased the site as a second park to complement Flamingo Land. When his son, Gordon Gibb, became chief executive of the company, his sister Vicky Gibb and later his other sister, Melanie Wood, took responsibility for the Cleethorpes park.

In 2010 Melanie Wood attained her goal of taking ownership of the park herself, separating it from the rest of the family company. Pleasure Island was then operated by Dewarsavile Enterprises Ltd, directed by Wood. This marked the end of the association between Pleasure Island and Flamingo Land. Pleasure Island closed at the end of the 2016 season.

== Animals ==
=== General overview ===
Flamingo Land houses exotic animals, including Brazilian tapirs, zebras, Vicuñas, hippopotamuses, giraffes, meerkats, baboons, lions, rhinoceroses, tigers, sea lions, parrots and peafowl.

The park takes part in breeding programmes. A mangabey breeding project was featured in the 2006 series of ITV1 show Theme Park.

In 2010 Flamingo Land started work on a penguin enclosure.

=== Affiliations ===
Flamingo Land is a member of the British and Irish Association of Zoos and Aquariums (BIAZA) and the European Association of Zoos and Aquaria (EAZA) and has connections to other parks in the country:

- One of the older Flamingo Land elephants, Jangoli, went on to give birth to calves at Chester Zoo.
- The park's male lion, lioness and her cubs were originally located at Longleat Safari Park before moving to Flamingo Land to start a new pride.
- Chessington World of Adventures was also once the home of one of the park's sealions, Clive.
- In 2017 Flamingo Land took custody of a new black rhino as part of a European breeding project, named Baringo.
- In 2019 The cheetahs came to Flamingo Land to start the European Breeding Programme.

=== African Animals ===
The park's emphasis is on their collection of African animals, housed in the Lost Kingdom and African Plains. The Lost River Ride was designed to give a safari experience before its final drop and meanders through savanna-style grasslands with giraffe, ostrich, zebra, antelope, hippopotamus, rhinoceros, tiger and lion. The Forgotten City Lion Reserve is also located in the middle of the ride.

== Holiday village ==
The park has a large holiday village with static caravans and log cabins, a leisure centre, a swimming pool, and a café.

There is also The Club and Zoo Bar, an entertainment venue which is exclusive for caravan owners and people staying on site overnight. It is a venue capable of holding over 1000 people and boasts a large stage and resident shows as well as light entertainment performed by visiting cabaret acts. There is also a small supermarket for guests to buy their own supplies.

== Theme park ==
In the past, Flamingo Land never contained any themed areas and was very much an amusement park. Since the beginning of the 21st century, the park has developed several themed areas.

=== River Side One ===
An area known as River Side One opened in 2014. This part of the resort is open to all visitors. This area contains The Club, Pizza Pie Takeaway Shop, the Gourmet Grill, Frog Hopper, Cliff Hanger and the American Diner. It also is the name of the outside concert stage which is home to their popular Party In The Park events which happen once a month at the park during the summer period. It normally has a famous artist or band headlining the show. When the concerts started they were originally hosted by Ryan Swain and Frank Lamingo.

=== Metropolis ===
Metropolis contains food outlets such as the Metropolis Bar and Grill, gift shops, cash machines, and pay-to-play game stalls. In 2016, the Mia and Mylo Show moved with the Farewell Show from the Riverside One to the Plaza, along with the new attraction – the Pirates of Zanzibar, an all-day interactive live show stylized as a large pirate ship. This area also features the rides Velocity, Navigator, "Sik", "Hero" and Vortex.

=== Flamingo 1 ===
This area is themed on racing and cars, as shown by its centrepiece ride Flamingo 1 Cars, a small go karting track. It also contains There is also the Upper Deck fish and chip restaurant (which also incorporates the children's play area HMS Bouncy), Jolly Sailor2Go, Fortune2Go (a Cantonese takeout hut), Cool Fuel, the Fuel Stop Cafe and Top Gear, all of which are contained in the brand new 'Hub' entertainment complex. This area is also the location of Fabrizio's Ristorante and Pizzeria.

=== Splosh! ===
This area was introduced for the summer of 2007 and features a water playground with squirting jets and water-dropping palm trees. Flip Flop is a gyro swing over a man made lake with water effects. Splash Battle is a submarine themed ride where ride cars and off ride posts around the ride are equipped with water cannons.

=== Dino Stone Park ===
Dino Stone Park is a prehistoric dinosaur-themed land which features five rides including the high altitude star flyer ride Pterodactyl and spinning family coaster called Twistosaurus, which opened in 2013.

=== Muddy Duck Farm ===
Formally known as the 'Little Monsters Den of Mischief', this area is mainly aimed at children, and includes the attractions Little Monster's Wacky Races and Mischief Mansion. This part of the park has been slowly phased out to make way for an area themed around farm animals, such as the Tractor Ride where children 'drive' the tractors around the farm animals' pens, incorporated into the small Children's Planet area.

=== Lost Kingdom Reserve ===
This area contains such rides as Lost River Ride, Kumali, and Voodoo. When it was built in 2009, Mumbo Jumbo had the steepest drop of any roller coaster in the world, at 112 degrees. This area is circled by the Daktari Express, a double-00 gauge railway that transports visitors around the reserve stylized as an African express train.

=== African Plains ===
This is an all-animal area containing various animal paddocks and is located in a quiet, secluded area of the zoo. The monorail offers a bird's eye view of the animals, as does the elevated pathway that goes over a small lake to the Penguin Coast.

=== Children's Planet ===
This children's area was opened in 2011 and combines both play areas and animal enclosures. This includes the "Peter Rabbit" section of the park.

=== Party In The Park ===
In 2014 a new area in the park called The Riverside One was built. The River Side One area consists of an undercover outdoor stage which has the capacity to hold over 2,000 people and consists of an outside cocktail bar called the R-Bar, a pizza shop, gourmet grill, American Diner and amusements. Flamingo Land Resort announced it was to host a brand new event called Party In The Park which was to take place monthly during the high season on the outdoor stage. The shows have become very popular over the recent years, with thousands of visitors and holiday guests enjoying a 3-hour live concert featuring live acts, bands, acrobats, dancers and celebrity guests on stage. Over the recent years it has seen the likes of Tinchy Stryder, Scouting for Girls, Heather Small, Union J, Vengaboys, Calum Scott, Sam Bailey, Peter Andre and many more headline the show. When the shows first started they were originally fronted and presented by local entertainer and presenter Ryan Swain and his puppet Frank Lamingo. After 3 consecutive years of fronting the events Ryan passed over the microphone to Dan Metcalf who currently presents the events. The stage used to host daily farewell show which features acrobats called The Bongo Warriors, live music and dance and special guests and Flamingo Land Resort mascots Mia & Mylo Meerkat, this has now been branded the sailaway show and relocated to the pirate ship stage in plaza square. In 2018 for the first time it held first auditions for Britain's Got Talent.

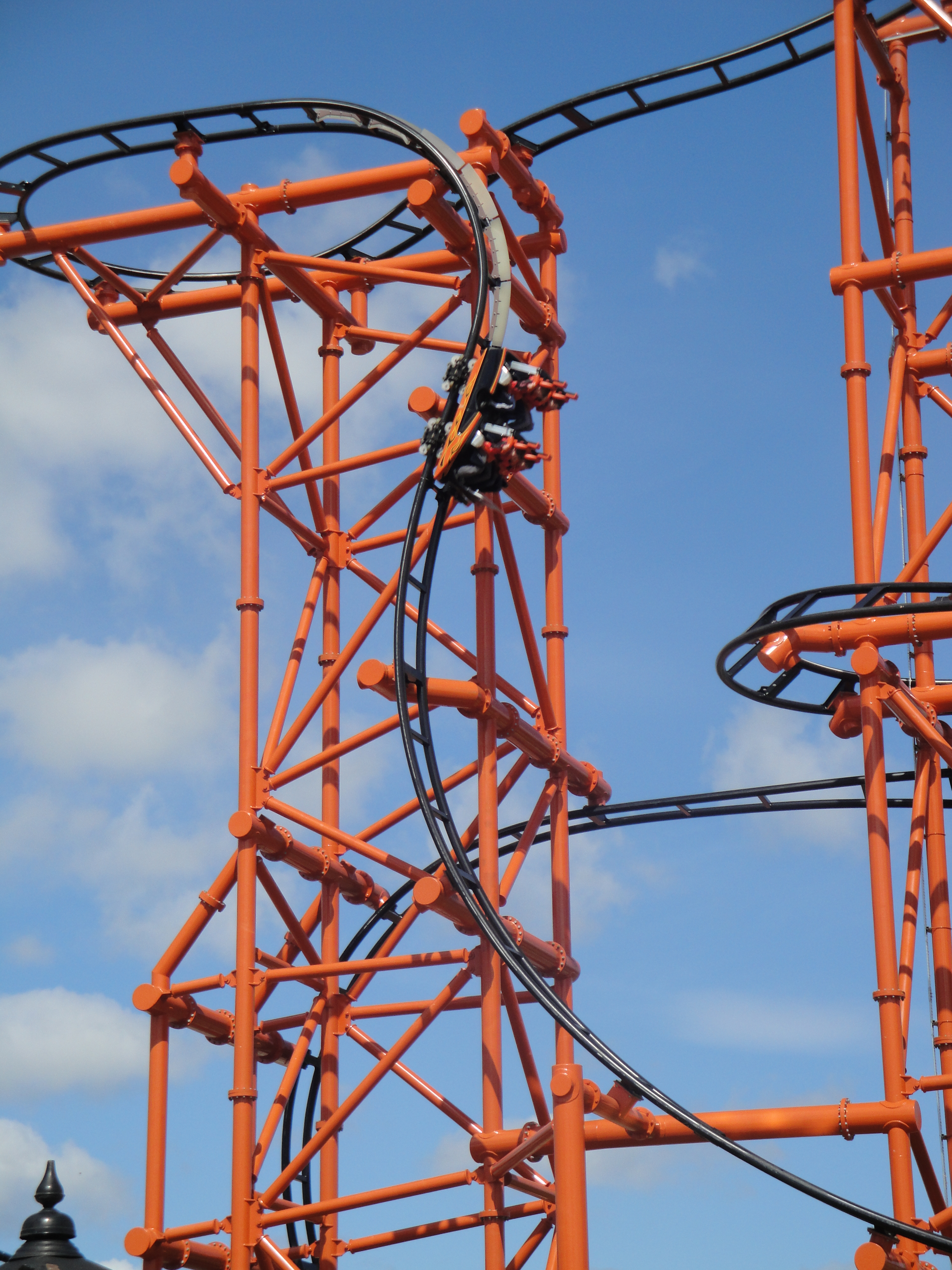
Mumbo Jumbo

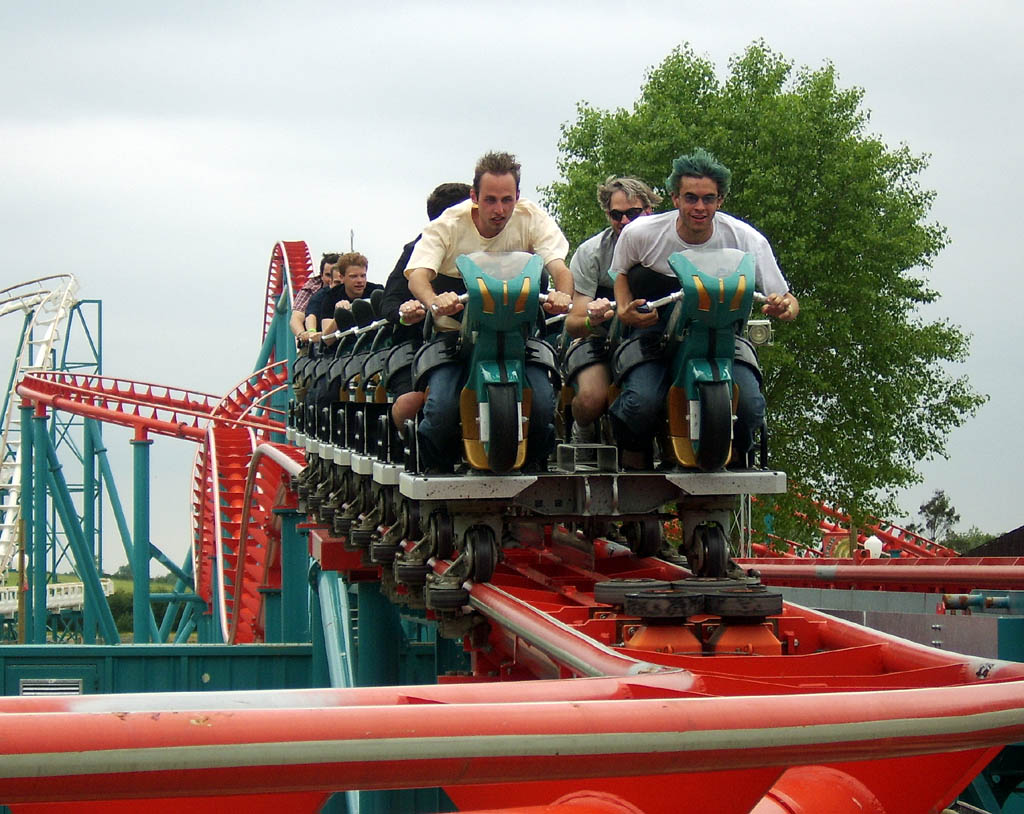
Velocity

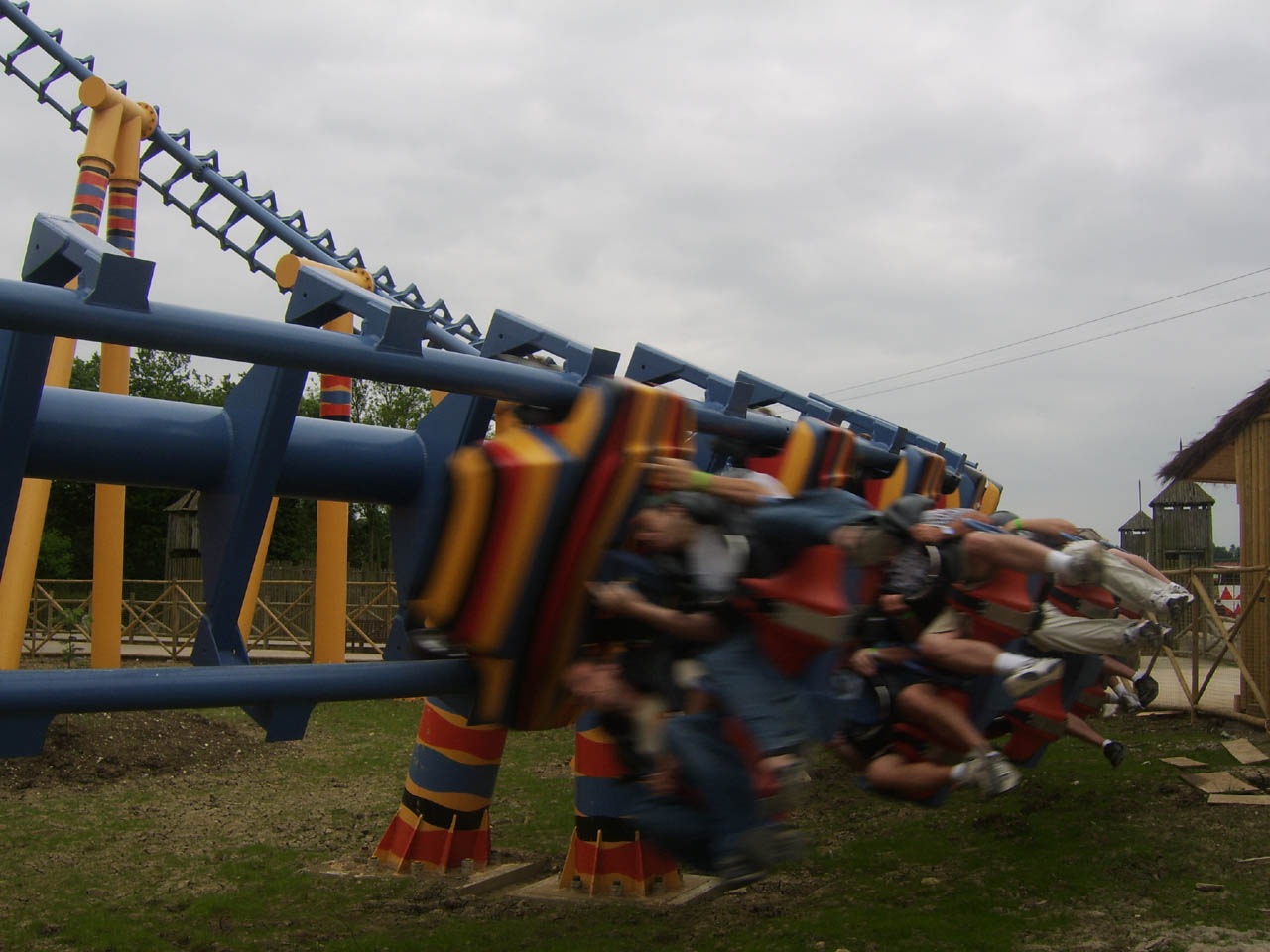
Kumali

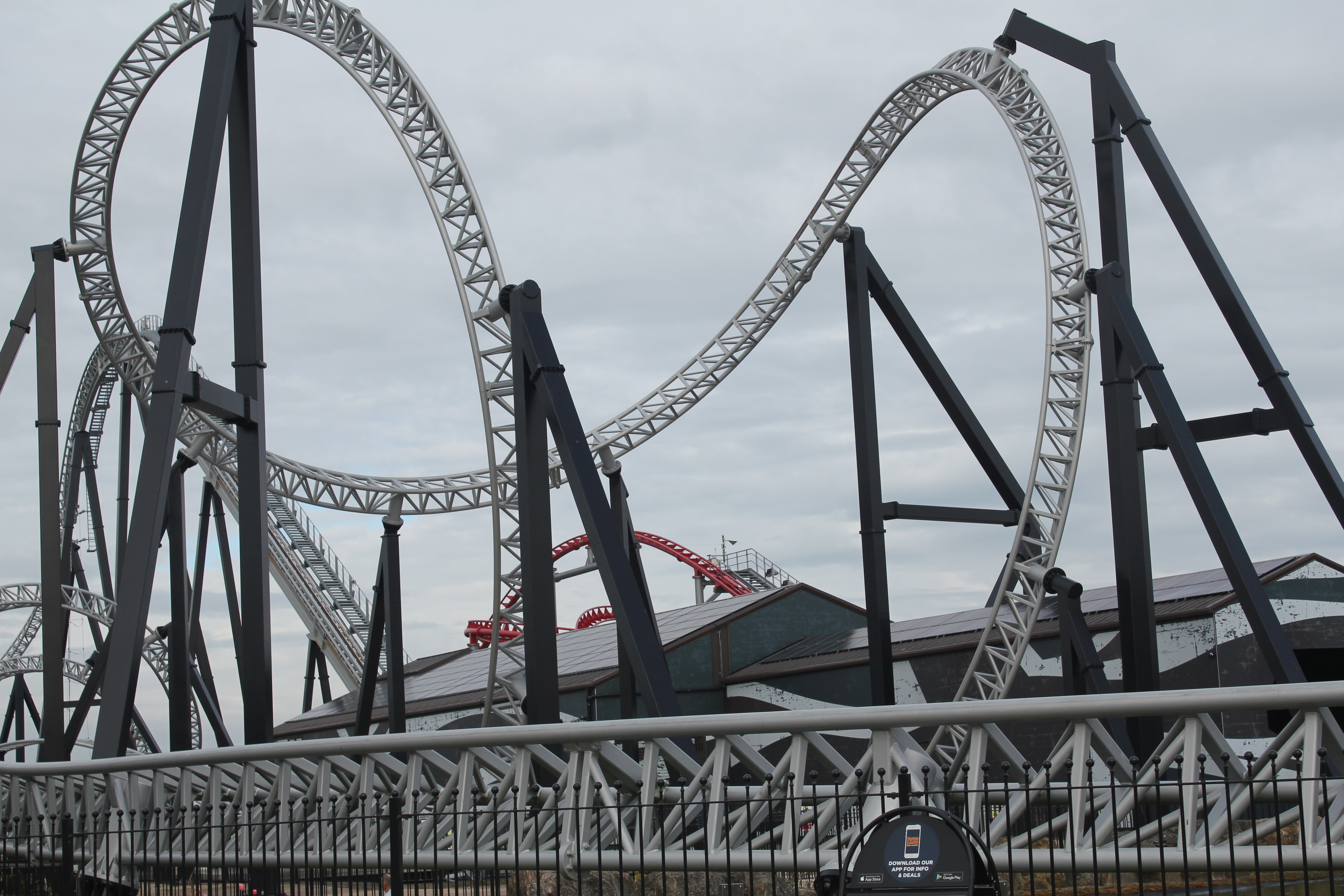
Sik

Colour	Category
	Thrill Rides
	Family Rides
	Kids Rides

=== Roller coasters ===
#	Name	Type	Opened	Manufacturer	Themed Land	Description
1	Velocity	Motorbike	2 July 2005	Vekoma	Flamingo1	A motorbike launched coaster that reaches a speed of 54 mph (87 km) on a 2109 ft long track (643 m) and a height of 57 ft (18 m); height limit 1.37 m.
2	Kumali	SLC/Inverted	1 April 2006	Vekoma	Lost Kingdom	Reaches a speed of 55 mph (88 km) on a 2203 ft long track (672 m) and a height of 118 ft (36 m) with 4 inversions (loop, cobra roll, zero g-roll); height limit 1.37 m. Train 2x10, SLC Shenlin model.
3	Mumbo Jumbo	El Loco/ Sit Down	4 July 2009	S&S Worldwide	Lost Kingdom	The steepest rollercoaster in the UK, reaches a speed of 41 mph (66 km) and a height of 98 ft (30 m); height limit 1.21 m. Train 2x6, El Loco model.
4	Hero	Volare/Flying	16 July 2013	Zamperla	Flamingo 1	Suspended above the busy streets of Metropolis, on the site of the old Wild Mouse. Identical layout to Soarin' Eagle at Luna Park in Coney Island.
5	Sik	Sit Down	2 July 2022	Intamin	Metropolis	Multi Inversion Coaster similar to Colossus at Thorpe Park, but features a steeper drop, trains with lapbars, thicker steel track and a cable lift hill. The ride has been named 'Sik' in honour of the local clothing brand 'Sik Silk'.
6	Zooom	Air Force/ Suspended	2011	Zamperla	Splosh!	An aeroplane-themed junior suspended coaster. Train 2x5, Air Force model.
7	Twistosaurus	Spinning	25 May 2013	Zamperla	Dino Stone Park	Twisting around the old Jurassic jungle. Family spinning rollercoaster.
8	Runaway Mine Train	Family Gravity/ Sit Down	2007	Zamperla	Splosh!	A junior mine-style coaster for children; height limit 1m. Train 2x6, 80STD Gravity Coaster. Previously at American Adventure.

=== Thrill rides ===
#	Name	Opened	Manufacturer	Themed Land	Additional Information
10	Cliff Hanger	2002	S&S Worldwide	Riverside One	The UK's only S&S combo drop tower ride. The ride is themed like a lighthouse; height limit 1.3m. The ride was installed by Ride Entertainment Group. A year after it was installed, the park had to remove the red and white cladding due to complaints from neighbours.
11	Navigator	April 2005	Zamperla	Flamingo 1	The first 'Mega' "Disk 'O'" type of ride ever to be built; height limit 1.21 m.
12	Pterodactyl	July 2012	Zamperla	Dino Stone Park	A 151 ft (46m) tall vertical spinning swing tower; height limit 1.21 m

=== Water rides ===
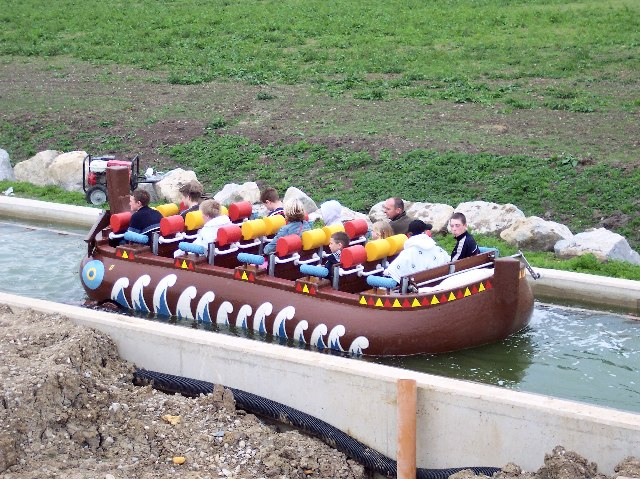
Lost River Ride

#	Name	Opened	Manufacturer	Themed Land	Description
13	Splash Battle	2007	Preston & Barbieri	Splosh!	The first interactive water ride in the UK. Ride cars themed as submarines travel along a track where targets must be hit to prevent the riders from being soaked; height limit 90 cm.
14	MAJI	2004/TBA	BEAR GmbH/Built in house	Lost Kingdom	A spillwater ride that gently meanders through animal enclosures such as rhinos, hippos, giraffes and lions before taking a plunge into a pool of water; height limit none / 1.2 m without adult supervision. Currently being reimagined with a smaller drop built in house whilst re-using the original boats

=== Other rides and attractions ===
#	Name	Opened	Themed Land	Description
15	Voodoo	2003	Lost Kingdom	A HUSS swinging Pirate ship ride; height limit 1.07 m.
16	Mischief Mansion	2001	Muddy Duck Farm	A ghost train suitable for families, it features horror characters including Frankenstein's monster, ghost, yeti, Dracula, and mummy as kids.
17	Balloon Race	1987	Riverside one	A balloon themed gondola.
18	Tractor Ride	2006	Muddy Duck Farm	A Metallbau Emmeln Tractor ride; height limit 1.07 m.
19	Gallopers	1984	Muddy Duck Farm	A set of Savage gallopers, previously located at Butlin's, Filey.
20	Vortex (formerly Rockin' Tug)	2005	Flamingo 1	A Zamperla rockin' tug ride; height limit 90 cm.
21	Frog Hopper	2002	Riverside One	Junior drop tower; height limit 90 cm.
22	Helitoys	2001	Muddy Duck Farm	Helicopter ride for kids; height limit 90 cm.
23	Swoosh Air	1980's	Swooosh!	Airplanes; height limit 90 cm.
24	Wacky Races	1985	Muddy Duck Farm	On track Ford T-models, manufactured by Big Country Motioneering. Height limit 1.07 m.
25	Jungle Carousel	2007	Muddy Duck Farm	Carousel.
26	Crazy Combat laser battle	2011	Splosh!	Laser battle pay to use
27	People Mover	1990	Flamingo 1	Travels from Seaside Adventure to Muddy Duck Farm. Built by Severn Lamb. Height limit none / 1.3 m alone.
28	Daktari Express	1970's or 1980's	Lost Kingdom	Train ride that takes visitors around the zoo; height limit none / 1.3 m alone.
29	Zoo Monorail	1984	The Zoo	Gives a bird's eye view of the animals. Built by Big Country Motioneering. Height limit none / 1.3 m alone
30	HMS Bouncy	2011	Flamingo 1	Indoor play area.
31	Pink Elephants	1980's or 1990's	Flamingo 1	A Roundabout previously located near Sik, but in March 2026 was rebuilt indoors at The Hub.
32	Playground	2011	Children's Planet	Play area.
33	Reptile Encounter	2011	Children's Planet	Reptiles.
34	Sand Play	2011	Children's Planet	Sand play area.
35	Splish Splosh	2007	Splosh!	Water play area.
36	Otter Water Play	2011	Children's Planet	Water play area.
37	Cyclosaurus	2013	Dino Stone Park	Small cycling roundabout

== Zoo ==
There are more 120 different species of animal in the park, including hippos, meerkats, reptiles, exotic birds, giraffes, lions, tigers, sealions, baboons, zebras, rare fish, penguins and otters.

== Shows ==
- Pirates of Zanzibar – live action pirate show in the Plaza, Show times 12:30, 2:30, 4:30 daily

== Past rides and attractions ==
#	Name	Opened	Closed	Description
1	Magnum Force	2000	2005	A Triple Loop Coaster built by Anton Schwarzkopf that originally toured German funfairs as Dreier Looping & Sunway Lagoon, Malaysia. Now located at Indiana Beach in the United States under the name All American Triple Loop.
2	The Bullet	1991	2005	A shuttle loop style coaster designed by Schwarzkopf. Originally known as Wiener Looping and previously operated in Austria, Florida, and on the German travelling funfair circuit before arriving at Flamingo Land. The ride was sold in 2012 to Selva Magica in Mexico, and opened in December 2013.
3	Corkscrew	1990	2011	A Vekoma corkscrew roller coaster that was one of the first rides to arrive at Flamingo Land, originally from Spanish City, Whitley Bay (1983 to 1989). The ride was dismantled in January 2012 and was relocated to Luna Park Cap d'Agde in France. Replaced by SIK in 2022.
4	Thunder Mountain	1991	2004	Enclosed within a rock themed structure to create a dark roller coaster. The track system was a Pinfari Z40.
5	Frank's Exploratorium	2001	2017	Magic House to explore; height limit none / 1.07 m alone. Replaced by Peter Rabbit show.
6	Sky Flyer	1993	2014	A Vekoma double inverted swinging ship style ride, formerly located in the Swoosh area. Relocated to Pleasure Island Family Theme Park as Voltar in March 2015.
7	Flying Trapeze	1996	2001	One of the world's most relocated coasters. The Four-Man Bob coaster was built by Zierer and previously operated in Traumland Park, Trentham Gardens, Alton Towers, and Pleasure Island before arriving in Flamingo Land. It was then refurbished by Bembom Rides and leased to Grove Land then was moved to Loudoun Castle before coming to Family Park in France, where it has operated since 2020.
8	Crazy Loop	1986	1995	A coaster was built by Pinfari was relocated to former sister park Pleasure Island. It has been operating as Shockwave, then Crazy Loop and now Bulldog Coaster in Brean Leisure Park since 2003.
9	Wild Mouse	1997	2012	A Maurer Söhne Wilde Maus Classic roller coaster. Removed in 2012 to make way for the new flying coaster, Hero, and now operates in Pleasurewood Hills under the name of Marble Madness since 2014.
10	Top Gun	1996	2004	Unique attraction where riders sat inside two-seater plane themed cars that spun around the centre tower while moving toward the top. The riders could choose to turn their cars up-side down during the ride. It was built by Intamin and based on the film of the same name. Relocated from Paramount's Kings Island in Mason, Ohio, United States.
11	Klondike Creek	1980s	2003	Triple drop log flume with a mine theme, believed to have been extended with sections of the removed Log Flume from Drayton Manor in 1999. It met the same end as the Drayton Manor attraction because it was replaced by a Bear Rides Chute the Shoots (Lost River Ride) in 2004.
12	Waikiki Wave/Tidal Wave	1993	2008	Vekoma Waikiki Wave ride, removed to make way for Mumbo Jumbo.
13	Terroriser/Circulator	1995	2007	A Fabbri Group evolution ride, moved to Pleasure Island in 2008.
14	Enterprise	c.1985	1994	An Enterprise ride, built by HUSS Park Attractions. Previously operated at Blackpool Pleasure Beach from 1979. Replaced by UFO.
15	Junior Driving School	1999	2012	A ride in which kids could drive electric buses.
16	Circus World	1990	2000	A circus show which featured acrobats and animals.
17	Dolphin Show	1980s 1990s	2001	A dolphin show.
18	Log Flume	1980s	1998	An original water ride.
19	Dive Booster	1980s or 1990s	2000s or 2010s	A spinning thrill ride
20	Waltzer	1991	2006	An A.R.M. waltzer ride.
21	Zig Zag	1994	2006	A P.W.S. twist ride.
22	Formula Car	1990s	2000s or 2010s	A go karts ride.
23	Cine 180	1980s	1900s or 2000s	A cinema.
24	Flying Carpet	1991	1992	A Weber 1001 Nacht. Later operated at Pleasure Island Family Theme Park from 1993 to 2001.
25	Ferris wheel	1970s or 1980s	1990s or 2000s	A Ferris wheel and is one of the parks first permanent rides.
26	High Flying Jets	1982	2003	Lang Wheels manufactured 'vampire' jets. Previously located at Peter Pan's Playground, Brighton.
27	Century 2000	1980s	1995	A Bakker Denies ramba zamba ride. Later operated at Pleasure Island Family Theme Park.
28	Razzle Dazzle	1986	1993	An A.R.M. satellite/trabant ride. Later operated at Pleasure Island Family Theme Park.
29	Sherlock Showtime	1996	2000	A Sherlock themed show
30	Clown Slide	1990	2000s	A Modern Products astroglide slide.
31	Dead Man's Drop	1980s	2000	A near-vertical steep slide that was located in the current Exploratorium.
32	The Rock A-fire Explosion	1987	2000s	Animatronic robot band entertainment show.
33	Gravitron	1994	1994	An A.R.M. manufactured rotor ride.
34	Flamingo Star	1995	2004	A HUSS Park Attractions Tri-Star. Operated at Alton Towers from 1991 to 1992 and then Pleasure Island from 1993 to 1994. Moved to Pleasurewood Hills in 2005 as Thunderstruck.
35	Octopus	1987	1994	A Robles Bouso polyp ride. Previously operated at Coney Beach Pleasure Park. Moved to Pleasure Island in 1995.
36	UFO	1995	2004	A HUSS Park Attractions UFO. Was sold to showman John Wesseldine.
37	Rock Slide		2013	An Ivan Bennett astroglide slide. Last located at Seaside Adventure beside the Cliff Hanger.
38	Professor Bubble's Seaside Adventure	1990	2016	Removed to make way for Daytona Bridge go karting track. It was a small Modern Products tracked ride.
39	Cycle Monorail	1989	2018	A monorail where it was manually operated by two people cycling around a course. It was located near Velocity. It was removed to make way for the construction of Flamingo Land's 10 Inversion rollercoaster.
40	The Swan	1980s		Roundabout.
41	Spotted Cow Ride	1990s		Junior carousel.
42	Dino Roller	1988	2025	Roller coaster
43	Go Gator	1982	2024	A very small coaster intended for younger children. Train 2x7, go gator model.
44	Blomberg's Tomb of Terror	2000	2003	A walk through scare maze attraction located in the Kirby Misperton Hall (The Mansion House) near the farm and carousel. Entrants were greeted with a waiting room and watched a preshow video being warned not to enter the tombs. After the video the guests were to enter a 2 way lift. After the lift opened again, occasionally the guests would be introduced to ghostface from the scream franchise.
45	Tea Cups	1991	2023	A children's Teacups ride manufactured by S&W Amusement Sales.
46	Flip Flop	2008	2025	A Fabbri frisbee ride over an artificial lake with water effects.
47	Rotataur	1990; 2005	1998; 2025	A Zamperla Ferris wheel, originally named Wagon Wheel. It operated at the park first from 1990 to 1998 in the zoo area before being relocated to Pleasure Island in 1999. It returned to the park in 2005 now situated on the former plot of Top Gun.

== In the media ==
Theme Park on ITV

Theme Park is an ITV docusoap shown in the Yorkshire and Tyne Tees Regions, following the behind the scenes activities of Flamingo Land. The first series was broadcast in 2001 and a prominent part of the show was the building of the new area The Little Monsters Den of Mischief. The series in 2004 followed the development of the new water ride, The Lost River, which replaced the previous log flume, Klondike Creek. 2006 saw the third series of the popular ITV1 show, and followed the construction of the park's new coaster, Kumali.

Zoo Vet at Large

The park's animal collection has also been a main feature of Zoo Vet at Large, which follows vet Matt Brash, both at his North Yorkshire surgeries and in his role as head vet at Flamingo Land. There have been several series on ITV1 and often repeated on the digital channel Sky Real Lives.

ChuckleVision

In an episode of ChuckleVision called "Romany Days", The Chuckle Brothers visit Flamingo Land in search of a pair of underpants that they believe to be of great value. The coaster they predominantly ride during the episode appears to be the Crazy Loop.

ITV Weather sponsorship

Flamingo Land took up the sponsorship of ITV Yorkshire weather in June 2007 and ITV Tyne Tees weather in July 2007. The campaign ran until the end of the season. This sponsorship was renewed with both ITV regions in March 2008 at the start of the new season.

Talk Flamingo

Talk Flamingo was a long-running, discussion-based website about the park with news, construction, history, pictures, reviews and multimedia. The site closed at the end of the park's 2009 season.

Udzungwa Forest Project (UFP)

Flamingo Land's wildlife management initiative operates in the villages closest to the Magombera forest with the aim to maintain tropical rainforest in Eastern Tanzania. The purpose of the project is to provide villagers with a long-term fuel alternative through education and research, therefore reducing firewood collection within the forest and thus the pressures placed upon the local environment.

Football sponsorship

It was announced that Flamingo Land would be the new shirt sponsors of both Hull City A.F.C. and Middlesbrough F.C. during the 2015–16 Football League Championship season. Flamingo Land also sponsor Championship team Leeds United.

Flamingopics

A flamingo land resort fansite running from 2012 – current. It features more than 2500+ photos 50 videos and plenty of information.

== Controversy ==
In 2012, park owner Gordon Gibb appeared in court charged with the assault of a ticket seller outside the entrance of the park.

On 22 May 2015, a teenage girl was injured and had to be taken to hospital when a footrail fell from a car of the Hero roller coaster and cut her head. Another person was treated at the scene. The Health and Safety Executive (HSE) launched an investigation into the incident. Hero reopened in early June.

Over the years there have been several demonstrations outside the entrance against keeping wild animals in captivity and in unnatural conditions.

== Political donations ==
Flamingo Land Limited have donated £185,999 to the Conservative Party since 2014.

Since 2024, the owners of Flamingo Land have financially supported Reform UK.
