= Gordon Gibb =

CEO of Flamingo Land Ltd and former chairman of Bradford City

Gordon Gibb is the CEO of Flamingo Land Ltd and former chairman of Bradford City Football Club.

== Personal ==
Gordon Gibb was born in November 1976 at Strathaven in Scotland, moving to Yorkshire attending a boarding school in Scarborough. when his father, Robert Gibb, a former professional footballer, set up the family run theme park Flamingo Land. Gordon continues to live in Yorkshire with his five children, but retains close links with his Scottish roots.

His father Robert Gibb died in 1995 when Gordon was 18 years old, after a car accident on his way to an emergency board meeting at Hamilton Academical Football Club where he was chairman. Gordon took over the responsibility of the family business.

The death of his father cut short Gibb's return to Scotland for higher education as he returned home to run the business. He had been reading politics, philosophy and economics at Glasgow University, before which he was educated at Woodleigh School and then leading York public school St Peter's.

Gibb's sporting career was also cut short when focus shifted to business rather than his football and rugby. He formerly represented Scotland Colts at Rugby Union. The sporting interest has continued however; as a keen amateur boxer with Westway ABC and also time as chairman of Bradford City Football Club.

Gibb was previously a Conservative Party donor, having given £187,500 to the party since 2014 according to Electoral Commission records. He endorsed Reform UK during the 2024 general election campaign, describing himself as "extremely disillusioned" with the Conservative Party.

== Flamingo Land Ltd ==
Flamingo Land Ltd is the operating company of Flamingo Land Resort. It was begun by Gordon Gibb's father, Robert Gibb, who was a director of Scotia Leisure, owners of the Yorkshire attraction. He purchased it from the company to develop it under his sole direction.

== Bradford City FC ==
Gibb joined Bradford City in August 2002, taking over as chairman from Geoffrey Richmond, with Julian Rhodes after the club had gone into administration. He resigned as chairman in January 2004, handing over to Rhodes, but his pension fund owns the club's Valley Parade ground.
